= Shiv Shakti – Tap Tyaag Tandav =

Indian hindu religious and historical television series

- Genre: Mythology
- Created by: Siddharth Kumar Tewary
- Story by: Siddharth Kumar Tewary
- Directed by: J.P Sharma
- Starring: Ram Yashvardhan; Subha Rajput
- Composers: Jitesh Panchal; Sushant Pawar
- Country of origin: India
- Original language: Hindi
- No. of seasons: 1
- No. of episodes: 914

Production
- Producers: Siddharth Kumar Tewary; Gayatri Gil Tewary; Rahul Kumar Tewary
- Camera setup: Multi-camera
- Running time: 20–40 minutes
- Production company: Swastik Productions

Original release
- Network: Colors TV
- Release: 19 June 2023 – 26 December 2025

Shiv Shakti – Tap Tyaag Tandav is an Indian Hindi-language television drama series that aired on Colors TV and JioHotstar from 19 June 2023 to 26 December 2025 at 8 p.m. The show traced the first love story of the universe with exploring the journey of Shiva and Shakti. Produced by Siddharth Kumar Tewary's Swastik Productions, it starred Ram Yashvardhan and Subha Rajput.

== Cast ==
=== Main ===
- Ram Yashvardhan as Mahadev
  - Also as Sadashiva / Virabhadra / Kalbhairava / Ardhanarishvara / Nataraja/ Tripurantaka/ Jalandhara / Babulnath / Sundareswarar / Somnath / Mallikarjuna / Mahakaal / Omkareshwar / Baidyanath / Nageshwara / Vishwanath / Kedarnath / Rudra / Pashupatinath / Kapali / Khandoba/ Bhootnath / Bholenath / Vrishabha(2023-2025)
- Subha Rajput as Parvati
  - Also as Shakti / Adishakti / Sati / Bhadrakali / Shailaputri / Brahmacharini / Chandraghanta / Kushmanda / Skandamata / Katyayani / Siddhidatri / Ardhanarishvara / Mahamaya / Tripura Sundari / Sankranti / Kaushiki / Dhumavati / Chamunda / Kali / Mahakali / Ambe / Mumba Devi / Mata Durga / Bahuchara Mata / Jagaddhatri / Vandevi / Devi Kanya Kumari / Meenakshi / Bhramari / Bagalamukhi / Ambika / Mhalsa / Chandi / Annapurna / Shitala / Shakambari / Kamakhya / Kheer Bhawani (2023-2025)

- Tarun Khanna / Kunal Bakshi as Indra (2023-2024) / (2024-2025)
- Ruchi RK Kaushal as Shachi (2025)
- Srikant Dwivedi as Vishnu / Kurma / Vamana / Krishna (2023-2025)
- Sheetal Tiwari / Shivya Pathania / Aanchal Goswami/ Pragati Tomar as Mahalakshmi / Bhudevi / Kolhapur Mahalakshmi (2023-2024) / (2024) / (2025) / (2025)
- Akangsha Rawat as Diti (2023-2025)
- Yash Bhojwani as Kartikeya / Murugan (2024-2025)
  - Swarnim Neema as young Kartikeya (2023-2024)
- Pooja Somani as Devasena / Devayanai (2025)
  - Shreya Patel as young Devsena (2024)
- Riyansh Vikram Dhabi / Kaizan Khambatta as Ganesha (2024) / (2024-2025)
- Puneet Vashist as Narada (2023-2025)
- Ketan Karande as Nandi (2023-2025)
- Dinesh Agarwal as Shivgan Badbola (2023-2025)
- Rohit Devda as Vasuki (2023-2025)

=== Recurring ===
- Mahan Mehta as Mohasur (2025)
- Amit Kalra as Mahabali (2023)
- Sandeep Aurora as Svarbhanu/Rahu/Ketu (2023-2025)
- Dinesh Mehta as Vajranga (2023)
- Jaydeep Kalsi as Surya (2023-2025)
- Meer Ali as Chandra (2023-2025)
- Keshav Aswani / Sanjay Sharma as Agni (2023-2025) / (2025)
- Ishaan Sharma as Varuna (2023-2025)
- Vivek Tripathi as Vayu (2023-2025)
- Akshay Dandekar as Kubera (2024-2025)
- Yogesh Mahajan / Nimai Bali/ Arup Pal as Shukracharya (2023-2025) / (2025) / (2025)
- Pratik Vohra as Durvasa (2023)
- Siddhant Issar as Tarakasura (2023-2024)
- Ramkisham Gurjar as Dambha (2023)
- Shweta Vyas as Shambuki (2023-2024)
- Shuman Das as Tarakaksha (2023)
- Satendra Yadav as Kamalaksha (2023)
- Asif Khan as Vidhyunmali (2023)
- Vaidehi Nair as Rohini (2023)
- Vishwajeet Pradhan as Daksha (2023)
- Sampada Vaze as Prasuti (2023)
- Preeti Gandwani as Aditi (2023)
- Shalini Vishnudev as Saraswati Devi (2023-2025)
- Deepak Bhatia as Brahma (2023-2025)
- Haelyn Shastri as Mohini (2023)
- Ansha Sayed as Vajrangi (2023)
- Prachi Bansal / Garima Verma as Ganga (2023-2024) / (2024-2025)
- Sanjeev Sharma as Himavat (2023)
- Jaswinder Gardner as Mainavati (2023)
- Ashutosh Yadav as Kamadeva (2023)
- Pranjali Singh Parihar as Rati (2023)
- Sonal Singh as Talika (2024)
- Priyall Ghore as Surupa (2023-2024)
- Unknown as Maharishi Angiras (2023)
- Unknown as Shankarasura (2024)
- Unknown as Kinkarasura (2024)
- Muskan Kalyani as Ashokasundari (2024)
- Garima Jain as Tulasi (2024)
- Farhaan Khan as Shankhchura (2024)
- Raviz Thakur as Bhasmasura (2024)
- Javed Pathan as Shumbha (2024)
- Ravish Rathi as Nishumbha (2024)
- Deepak Kumar Verma as Apasmara (2024)
- Gurpreet Singh as Bhagiratha (2024)
- Kartikey Malviya as Shani (2024-2025)
- Unknown as Rambha (2024)
- Supriti Sharma as Shyamala (2024)
- Unknown as Dhumralochana (2024)
- Unknown as Chanda (2024)
- Unknown as Munda (2024)
- Unknown as Vaishnavi (2024)
- Unknown as Varahi (2024)
- Unknown as Narasimhi (2024)
- Unknown as Kaumari (2024)
- Unknown as Indrani (2024)
- Varnita Sati as Maheshwari (2024)
- Unknown as Brahmani (2024)
- Uthpal Dashora as Raktabeeja (2024)
- Zuber Ali / Arav Chowdhary as Mahishasura (2024)
  - Unknown as young Mahishasura
- Chetan Hansraj as Parashurama (2024)
- Manish Bishla as Samudra (2024-2025)
- Saanvie Tallwar as Vrinda (2024)
- MM Rishi as Nahusha (2024)
- Vipin Sharma as Hunda (2024)
- Aniket Chauhan as Mushaka (2024)
- Gitanjali Mangal as Dakini (2024)
- Unknown as Katyayana (2024)
- Brownie Parashar as Kashyapa (2024-2025)
- Unknown as Analasura (2024)
- Alihassan Turabi as Pururava (2024)
- Sharma M Shishir as Mumbarak (2024)
- Jameel Choudhary as Karindrasura (2024)
- Melissa Pais as Mahishi (2024-2025)
- Randheer Rai as Gajasura (2024-2025)
- Amit Sinha as the Kinnaur Guru (2024)
- Karanvir Bohra as Andhaka (2024)
- Heer Chopra as Rambha (2024)
- Amit Pachori as Mangala/Bhaum (2024)
  - Kamini Dhoarjiya as child Bhaum
- Yash Kail as Vajramali (2024)
- Rokky Mahajan as Krauncha (2025)
- Unknown as Agastya (2025)
- Bhupinder Bhoopi as Jimranasura (2025)
- Riya Sharma as Devi Kanya Kumari (2025)
- Shahwar Ali Khan as Arunasura (2025)
- Unknown as Bhrigu (2025)
- Jasmeet Kaur as Rani Kanchanmala (2025)
- Athar Siddiqui as Rajkumar Vayu (2025)
- Anila Kharbanda as Nagmata (2025)
- Unknown as Gautama (2025)
- Saurav Gurjar as Swarth (2025)
- Riya Deepsi as Manasa (2025)
- Divya Lakshmi as Kadru (2025)
- Lala Naren Pandey as Heti (2025)
- Saif Ullah Rahmani as Praheti (2025)
- Unknown as Dundubhirnaad (2025)
- Akshay Nalwade as Garuda (2025)
- Rushiraj Pawar as Malla and Mani (2025)
- Preeti Amin as Mahalasa's mother (2025)
- Vishal Patni as Kali (2025)
- Amar Sharma as Ripunjay/Divodas (2025)
- Abhilash Chaudhary as Narakasura (2025)
- Kinjal Pandya as Daruka (2025)
- Ajay Dhansu as Dāruka (2025)
- Unknown as Mahishi (2025)
- Unknown as Ayyappa (2025)
- Vishesh Arora as Ayyappa's father (2025)
- Deepak Tanwar as Vipracitti (2025)
- Unknown as Vishwakarma (2025)
- Puneet Issar as Ravana/Jaya (2025)
- Sameer Khan as Vijaya (2025)
- Unknown as Sumali (2025)
- Unknown as Pulatsya (2025)
- Unknown as Kaikesi (2025)
- Firoz Ali as Marutta (2025)
- Manthan Setia as Anaranya (2025)
- Unknown as Mandodari (2025)
- Devish Ahuja as Meghanada (2025)

== Production ==
=== Development ===
The series set was designed by Omung Kumar. He said that it took two to three months to complete the set's design, including Kailash, Asur Lok and Indra Lok.

=== Casting ===
Ram Yashvardhan and Subha Rajput were cast to play the leads as Shiva and Shakti. Tarun Khanna was cast to play Indra. Vishwajeet Pradhan was cast as Daksha. Srikant Dwivedi was cast to play Vishnu.

Reception

The series started with an average rating of 1.3 TVR. It started to grow slowly and entered the top 10 most watched Hindi TV serials. During the Sati Daahan (Demise) track in the 2nd week of August 2023, it received 2.1 TVR and became the fourth most watched Hindi TV serial. The channel sent off air notice to makers due to low trp and a promo stating that the rudra avtar and devi mahakali would be a "Antim Adhyay" was published but the trp went up in the antim adhyay track and the show become 2nd most watched show on the channel and received 6 months extension. Owing to low trp it went off air on 26 December 2025

== Spin-off ==
The show has a spin-off series named Lakshmi Narayan – Sukh Saamarthya Santulan, describing the story of Lord Narayan and Goddess Lakshmi which aired from 22 April to 2 October 2024. The cast of both shows were all same.

== Awards and nominations ==
Year	Award	Category	Recipient	Result	Ref.
2026	Indian Television Academy Awards	Best Music Composer - TV	Jitesh Panchal & Sushant Pawar	Pending	
