= Kalabhairavi Temple =

- Location in Odisha

Religion
- Affiliation: Hinduism
- District: Khurda
- Deity: Goddess Chamunda

Location
- Location: Bhubaneswar
- State: Odisha
- Country: India
- Interactive map of Kalabhairavi Temple
- Coordinates: 20°21′40″N 85°51′17″E

Architecture
- Type: Kalingan Style (Kalinga Architecture)
- Completed: 12th century A.D.
- Elevation: 23 m (75 ft)

Kalabhairavi Temple is located at Bhubaneswar of Odisha, India (Location Lat- 20°21’ 40", Long- 85° 50’ 77", Elev- 76 ft) within the Jaleswar Siva Temple Precinct, Kalarahanga. The enshrined deity is a four armed Chamunda sitting over a dead body. The deity holds a khatuanga in her upper right hand, a snake in upper left hand, a severed head in lower left hand and the lower right hand is broken. The deity is crowned with jatamukuta and wearing a garland of skull. The whole image rests over a pedestal measuring 0.50 metres in height.

== Ownership ==
i) Single/ Multiple: Multiple

ii) Public/ Private: Private

== Age ==
i)Precise date: —

ii) Approximate date: 12th Century

iii) Source of Information: —

== Property Type ==
i) Precinct/ Building/ Structure/Landscape/Site/Tank: Precinct

ii) Subtype: Temple

iii) Typology: Pidha deul

== Property use ==
i) Abandoned/ in use: In use

ii) Present use: Living temple

iii) Past use: Worshipped

== Significance ==
i) Historic significance: The temple was constructed by king Madhusudhan Deva

ii) Cultural significance: Rituals like Durga Ashtami (Durga Puja), is observed.

iii)Social significance: Birthday ceremony, engagement, mundanakriya, thread ceremony are observed.

== Physical description ==
i) Surrounding: The temple is surrounded by the compound wall in the west, north and south, open space in the precinct in east.

ii) Orientation: Facing towards east.

iii) Architectural features ( Plan & Elevation): On plan, the temple has a square vimana measuring 3.85 square metres with a frontal porch of 1.15 metres . On elevation, the vimana is a pidha deul having bada, gandi and mastaka measures 6.80 metres in height. With the fivefold divisions of bada the temple has a panchanga bada that measures 2.84 metres in height(pabhaga 0.76 metres, tala jangha 0.66 metres, bandhana 0.09 metres, upara jangha 0.64 metres, baranda 0.69 metres.) The gandi and the mastaka measures 2.50 metres and 1.50 metres in height respectively.

iv) Raha niche & parsva devata: The raha niches uniformly measures 0.66 metres in height x 0.38 metres in width x 0.27 metres in depth. All the niches are empty.

v) Decorative features: — Doorjamb: The doorjambs are decorated with three plain vertical bands measurings 1.68 metres in height and 0.82 metres in width. In the architrave there is a navagraha panel flanked by two bharabahakas in either sides like that of Kotitirthesvara Siva temple in Old Town, Bhubaneswar. At the base of the doorjambs Saivaite dvarapala are noticed within the niches.

vi) Building material: Laterite and Sandstone

vii) Construction techniques: Dry masonry.

viii) Style: Kalingan

ix) Special features, if any: —

== State of preservation ==
i) Good/Fair/ Showing Signs of Deterioration/Advanced: Showing signs of deterioration due to the growth of vegetation like Pipal tree and creepers.

ii) State of Decay/Danger of Disappearance: —-

== Condition description ==
i) Signs of distress: Cracks are noticed in the gandi of vimana for which rain water percolates into the sanctum from the roof.

ii) Repairs and Maintenance: It was repaired by State Archaeology under X and XI Finance Commission Award.

== Grade (A/B/C) ==
i) Architecture: B

ii) Historic: C

iii) Associational: B

iv) Social/Cultural: B

== Date of Documentation ==
10.09.2006

== Documenter ==
Dr. Sadasiba Pradhan and team
