= Kanya Puja =

Hindu holy ritual

Kanyā Pūjā ( Kumārī Pūjā )
- Observed by: Hinduism
- Type: Navaratri
- Celebrations: 1 day
- Date: On the eighth day and ninth day Navaratri

Kanyā Pūjā or Kumārī Pūjā, is a Hindu holy ritual, carried out especially on the Ashtami (eighth day) and Navami (ninth day) of the Navaratri festival. The ceremony primarily involves the worship of nine girls, representing the nine forms of Goddess Durga (Navadurga). As per Hindu philosophy, these girls are considered the manifestation of the natural force of creation. Legend says that it was on the ninth day of Navaratri that Shakti had taken the form of Goddess Durga, on the request of the devas to kill the demon Mahisasura.

== Customs ==
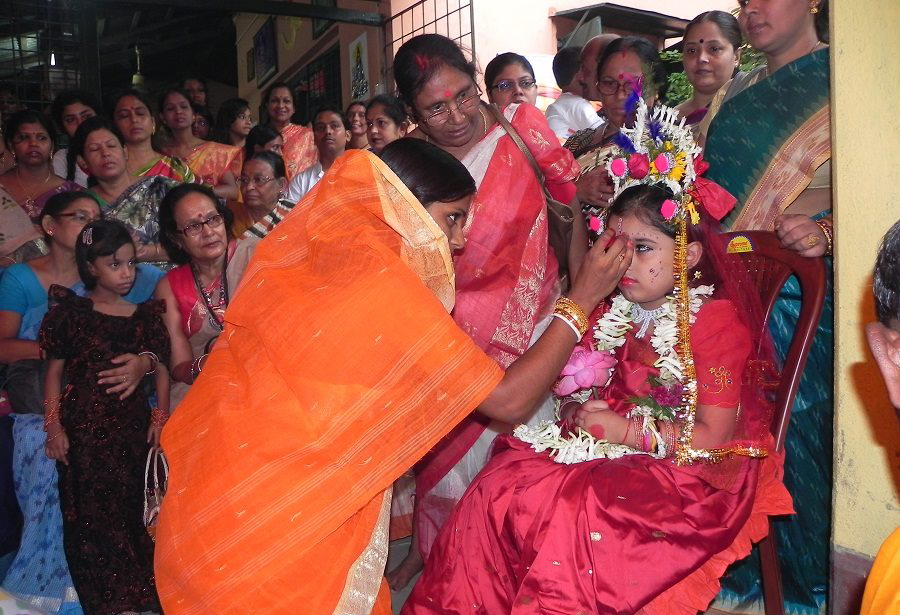
Maha Ashtami Kumari Puja

It is a custom to wash and clean the feet of these nine young girls as a mark of respect for the Goddess and offer new clothes as gifts by the devotee. Kanya Puja as a part of Devi worship is to recognise the feminine power vested in the girl child.

The girl should be of young age. There is also a ritual purification and chanting of mantras. She is made to sit on a special pedestal. She is worshipped by offering 'akshat' (rice grains) and by burning incense sticks. She is worshipped because, according to the philosophy of 'Striyah Samastastava Devi Bhedah', women symbolize Mahamaya (the goddess Durga). A girl is considered to be the purest because of her innocence.
