= Rambha (asura) =

Asura in Hindu mythology

- Affiliation: Asura
- Texts: Puranas

Rambha is an asura in Hindu mythology. Rambha and Karambha are asura brothers, born as the descendants of Danu and Kashyapa. When they were young, both decided to perform penance to get special powers to establish the rule of Danavas in the universe.

== Penance and boon ==
According to the Puranas, Rambha and Karambha did Tapas (Indian religions) at Pañcanada for the blessing of having children.

Rambha, standing amidst five fires, meditated on Agni, and Karambha, standing in the river's water, meditated on Varuna. Indra found out about this, he decided to kill them, first in the guise of a crocodile dragged Karambha away by the feet and killed him by drowning him. Then Indra went after Rambha to kill him but was saved by Agni. Sad at the death of his brother, Rambha decided to cut off his head and offer it as a sacrifice. When he was about to do so, Agni appeared and blocked him and promised to grant him whatever he desired.

Accordingly, Rambha requested Agni for a son more effulgent than the Agni, who would conquer the Three Worlds and would not be defeated even by the Devas (Hinduism) and the Asuras. Rambha further wanted that son to be as powerful as Vāyu, exceptionally handsome and skilled in archery. Agni blessed Rambha that he would have, as desired, a son by the woman whom he coveted.

== Birth of Mahishasura ==
On Rambha's way back home, he saw a beautiful she-buffalo called Shyamala, whom he married. Shyamala was a princess who had become a water buffalo due to a sage's curse. Rambha took Shyamala, who got pregnant by him, to Patala to protect it from the attack by other buffaloes. One day another buffalo felt a passion for Shyamala and in a fight that buffalo killed Rambha by impaling him with his horns. Later, the water buffalo was killed by Rambha's soldiers. Shyamala died in Rambha's funeral pyre by jumping into it. It was from that fire the very powerful Mahishasura was born. Rambha also rose from the fire under the name Raktabīja along with his son Mahishasura.

== Rebirth ==
According to legends, Rambha was reborn as Raktabīja, the army commander of Shumbha and Nishumbha. Raktabīja secured from Shiva a boon according to which if one drop of blood from his body fell on the battlefield, many Raktabījas would arise from the blood and fight the enemies. Each of these Raktabījas would also be like the others in the matter of strength, form, and weapons. When devas sent Kaushiki to kill demon brothers, she had to face the stiffest opposition from Raktabīja. Kaushiki then took the form of Kali,fought him and badly wounded him and licked off his blood before it touched the ground. Gradually, Raktabīja was defeated and killed.

== See also ==
- Raktabīja
- Chanda and Munda
- Shumbha and Nishumbha
- Mahishasura
- Dhumralochana
- Sugriva (asura)
