= Vandevi Temple =

Vandevi Temple or Van Devi Temple may refer to one of the several temples in India,

- Van Devi Temple, Bihta in Patna, Bihar
- Vandevi Temple, Renukoot in Sonbhadra, Uttar Pradesh
