= Shumbha and Nishumbha =

Asuras in Hinduism

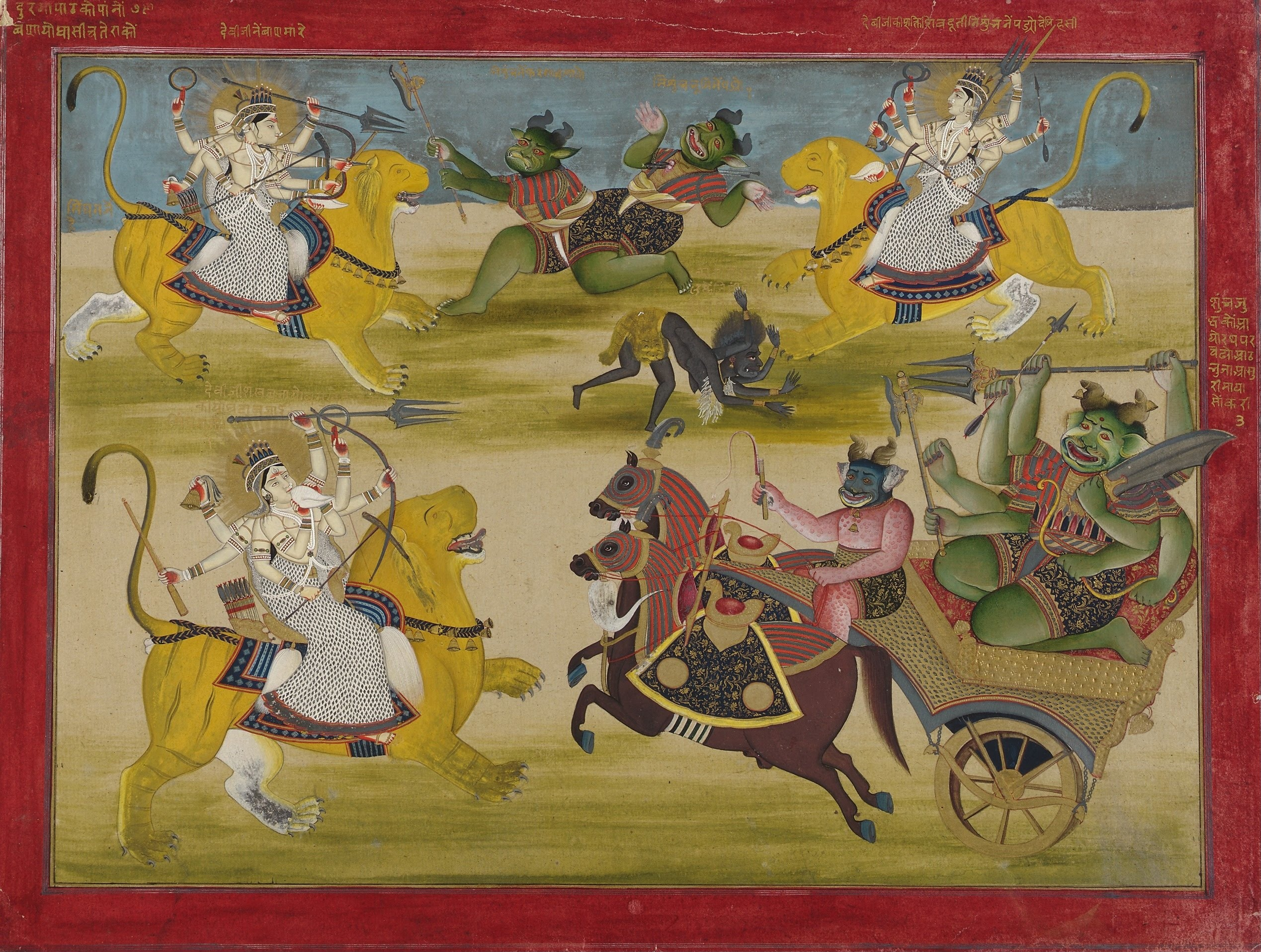
Painting of Durga fighting Shumbha and Nishumbha

Shumbha (शुम्भ) and Nishumbha (निशुम्भ) are two asuras in Hindu mythology, featured in the Devi Mahatmya. In their legend, they were slain by the goddess Kaushiki.

== Legend ==
The story of Shumbha and Nishumbha begins in the fifth chapter of the Devi Mahatmya.

This story tells how two asura brothers sought to conquer the three worlds by subjecting themselves to severe penance and purification rituals Shumbha and Nishumbha traveled to Pushkara, a sacred site, and remained there in prayer for ten thousand years. The creator deity Brahma saw the brothers' penance, and was pleased, granting them the boon that no man or deva or asura could destroy them.

Once Chanda and Munda, servants of Shumbha, encountered the goddess Durga, and were overwhelmed by her beauty. They carried reports of this goddess to Shumbha, who sought to possess Durga. Shumbha sent the asura Sugriva to court Parvati, but she rejected his advances. It was then decided by the asura brothers that if Parvati would not come willingly, they would have to grab her. First, the asura Dhumralochana and his army of sixty-thousand asuras were sent to grab Parvati. Various goddesses assumed the forms from Durga and slew the entire army. Next, Chanda and Munda were deployed, who were also destroyed by Kali. Raktabīja was sent next, and was slain by the goddess Kali.

== Death ==
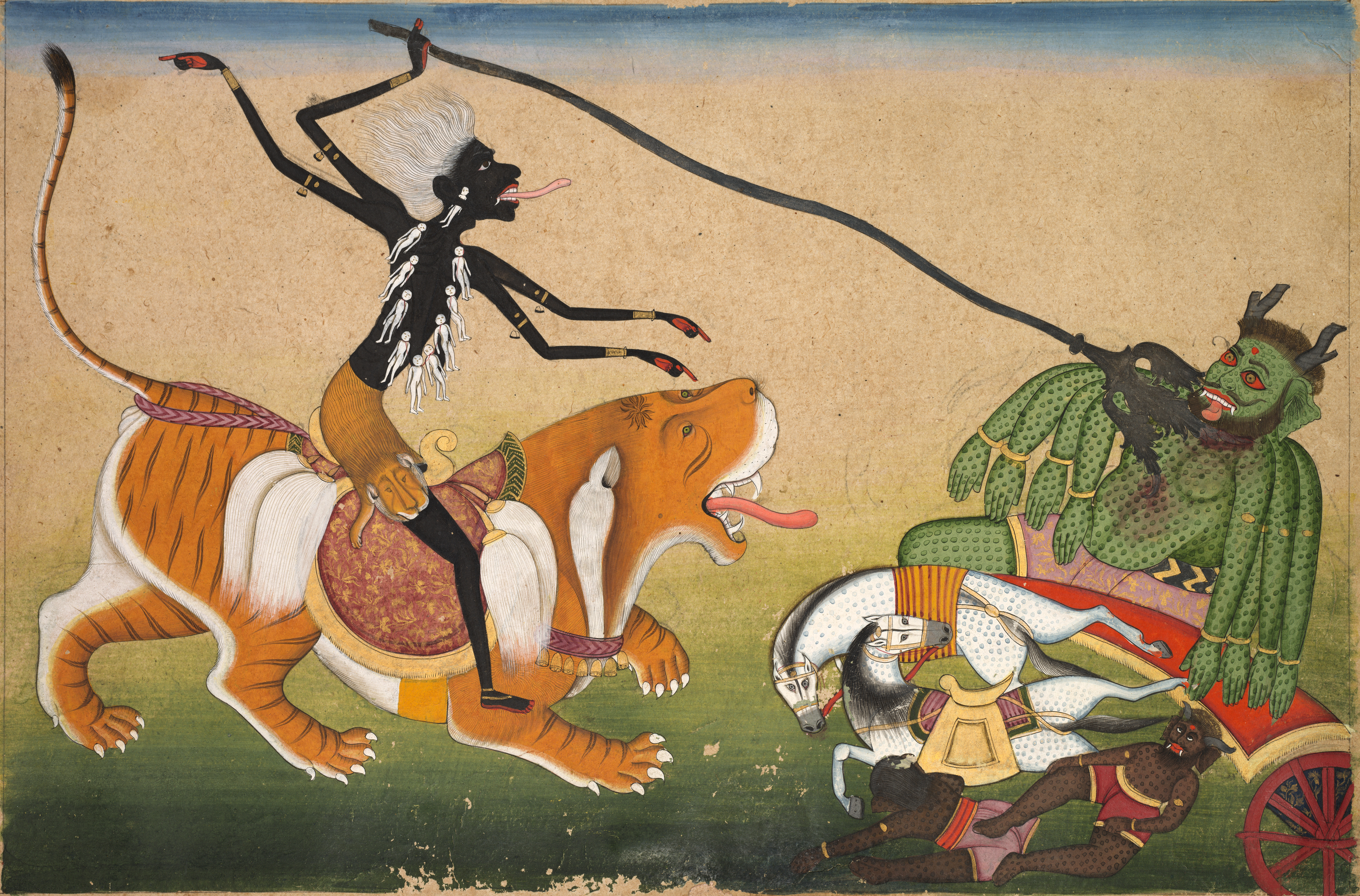
A Pahari depiction of Kali (sometimes described as a form of Parvati) attacking Nishumbha with her trident: Kali Attacking Nishumbha; c. 1740, colour on paper, 22 × 33 cm, Cleveland Museum of Art.

After these encounters, Shumbha and Nishumbha had no choice but to meet Parvati in direct combat. Although Brahma's boon had granted the brothers protection against men devas and demons, no such protection existed against female goddesses. Nishumbha was the first to fall, after assaulting Parvati's lion. Upon seeing the death of his brother, Shumbha went after Parvati in a rage, but ultimately The goddess pierced him with her trident in the chest and killed him. With Shumbha and Nishumbha gone, the Three Worlds returned to their ordinary state of being, rid of a great evil.

== In popular culture ==
Some, such as John Stratton Hawley and Donna Marie Wulff, see Shumbha and Nishumbha as symbols of arrogance and pride which is ultimately overcome by Parvati's humility and wisdom. In Shashi Tharoor's satirical novel The Great Indian Novel, the story of Shumbha and Nishumbha is used both as a warning against the dangers of seduction, and as a metaphor for the collapse of the relationship among the five Pandavas. There is also a Kannada Movie by the name of Shumba Nishumba and tell the story of Asuras and Parvati.

== See also ==
- Chanda and Munda
- Mahishasura
- Raktabīja
- Rambha (asura)
