= Kali =

Major deity in Indian religions symbolising power, time, and death

- Goddess of Time, Death and Destruction
- Member of The Ten Mahavidyas
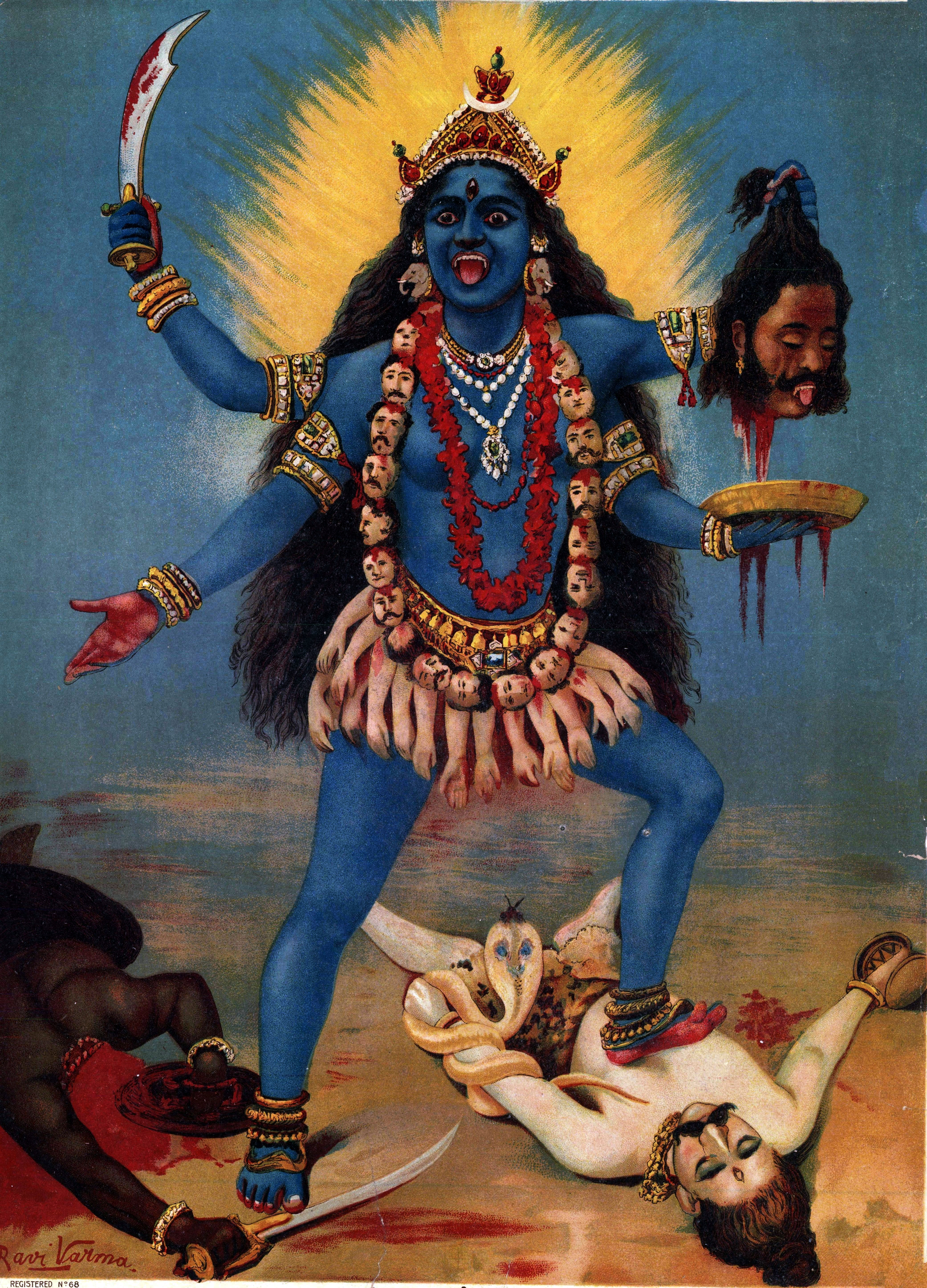
- Kali by Raja Ravi Varma
- Affiliation: Shakti; Mahadevi; Durga; Parvati; Mahakali; Mahavidyas
- Abode: Cremation grounds, Battlefields (varies by interpretation), Maṇidvīpa
- Mantra: oṁ jayantī maṅgalā kālī bhadrakālī kapālinī durgā śivā kṣamā dhātrī svāhā svadhā namo'stute; oṁ kālī kālī mahākālī kālike parameśvari sarvānandakare devī nārāyaṇi namo'stute; oṁ krīṃ kālīkāyai namaḥ
- Weapon: Scimitar, Trishula (Trident)
- Day: Tuesday and Friday
- Mount: Jackal
- Texts: Devi-Bhagavata Purana, Devi Mahatmya, Kalika Purana, Shakta Upanishads, Tantras
- Gender: Female
- Festivals: Kali Puja; Seventh day of Navaratri; Kali Chaudas
- Consort: Shiva

Kali (/ˈkɑː.liː/; Sanskrit: काली, IAST: Kālī), also called Kālika, is a major goddess in Hinduism, primarily associated with time, death, and destruction. Kali is also connected with transcendental knowledge and is the first of the ten Mahavidyas, goddesses who provide liberating knowledge. Of the numerous Hindu goddesses, Kali is held to be the most famous. She is the preeminent deity in the Hindu tantric and the Kalikula worship traditions, and is a central figure in the goddess-centric sects of Hinduism as well as in Shaivism. Kali is chiefly worshipped as the Divine Mother, Mother of the Universe, and Divine feminine energy.

The origins of Kali can be traced to the pre-Vedic and Vedic era goddess worship traditions in the Indian subcontinent. Etymologically, Kali refers to one who governs time or is black. The first major appearance of Kali in Sanskrit literature is in the sixth-century CE text Devi Mahatmya. Kali appears in many stories, the most popular recounting her personification of the goddess Durga's rage to defeat the demon Raktabija. The terrifying iconography of Kali makes her unique among the goddesses and symbolises her embrace and embodiment of the grim worldly realities of blood, death and destruction.

Kali is stated to protect and bestow liberation (moksha) to devotees who approach her as a child towards a mother. Devotional songs and poems that extol the motherly nature of Kali are popular in Bengal, where she is most widely worshipped as the Divine Mother. Shakta and Tantric traditions additionally worship Kali as the ultimate reality or Brahman. In modern times, Kali has emerged as a significant symbol for women.

== Etymology ==
The term Kali is derived from Kala, which is mentioned quite differently in Sanskrit. The homonym kālá (time) is distinct from kāla (black), but these became associated through popular etymology. Kali is then understood as "she who is the ruler of time", or "she who is black". Kālī is the goddess of time or death and the consort of Shiva. She is called Kali Mata ("the dark mother") and also kālī, which can be read here either as a proper name or as a description: "the dark (or black) one".

== History ==
Although the word Kālī appears as early as the Atharva Veda, the first use of it as a proper name is in the Kathaka Grhya Sutra (19.7). Kali originated as a tantric and non-Vedic goddess. Her roots are most probably connected to the Pre-Aryan period. According to Indologist Wendy Doniger, Kali's origins can be traced to the deities of the Pre-Vedic village, tribal, and mountain cultures of South Asia who were gradually appropriated and transformed by the Sanskritic traditions.

== Legends ==
Her most well-known appearance is on the battlefield in the sixth century text Devi Mahatmyam. The deity of the first chapter of Devi Mahatmyam is Mahakali, who appears from the body of sleeping Vishnu as goddess Yoga Nidra to wake him up in order to protect Brahma and the world from two asuras (demons), Madhu-Kaitabha. When Vishnu woke up he started a war against the two asuras. After a long battle with Vishnu, the two demons were undefeated and Mahakali took the form of Mahamaya to enchant the two asuras. When Madhu and Kaitabha were enchanted by Mahakali, Vishnu killed them.

In later chapters, the story of two asuras who were destroyed by Kali can be found. Chanda and Munda attack the goddess Kaushiki. Kaushiki responds with such anger that it causes her face to turn dark, resulting in Kali appearing out of her forehead. Kali's appearance is dark blue, gaunt with sunken eyes, wearing a tiger skin sari and a garland of human heads. She immediately defeats the two asuras. Later in the same battle, the asura Raktabīja is undefeated because of his ability to reproduce himself from every drop of his blood that reaches the ground. Countless Raktabija clones appear on the battlefield. Kali eventually defeats him by sucking his blood before it can reach the ground, and eating the numerous clones. Kinsley writes that Kali represents "Durga's personified wrath, her embodied fury".

Other origin stories involve Parvati and Shiva. Parvati is typically portrayed as a benign and friendly goddess. The Linga Purana describes Shiva asking Parvati to defeat the asura Daruka, who received a boon that would only allow a female to kill him. Parvati merges with Shiva's body, reappearing as Kali to defeat Daruka and his armies. Her bloodlust gets out of control, only calming when Shiva intervenes. The Vamana Purana has a different version of Kali's relationship with Parvati. When Shiva addresses Parvati as Kali, "the dark blue one", she is greatly offended. Parvati performs austerities to lose her dark complexion and becomes Gauri, the golden one. Her dark sheath becomes Kaushiki, who while enraged, creates Kali.

In the Devi Bhagavata Purana, Kali turns black out of rage, while battling the demons Shumbha and Nishumbha.

=== Slayer of Raktabīja ===
In Kāli's most famous legend, Durga and her assistants, the Matrikas, wound the demon Raktabīja, in various ways and with a variety of weapons in an attempt to destroy him. They soon find that they have worsened the situation for with every drop of blood that drips from Raktabīja, he reproduces a duplicate of himself. The battlefield becomes increasingly filled with his duplicates. Durga summons Kāli to combat the demons. This episode is described in the Devi Mahatmyam, Kali is depicted as being fierce, clad in a tiger's skin and armed with a sword and noose. She has deep, red eyes with tongue lolling out as she catches drops of Raktabīja's blood before they fall to the ground and create duplicates.

Kali consumes Raktabīja and his duplicates, and dances on the corpses of the slain. In the Devi Mahatmya version of this story, Kali is also described as a Matrika and as a Shakti or power of Devi. She is given the epithet Cāṃuṇḍā (Chamunda), that is, the slayer of the demons Chanda and Munda. Chamunda is very often identified with Kali and is very much like her in appearance and habit.

== Iconography and forms ==
The goddess Kali is regarded as the most famous female deity of all the numerous Hindu goddesses. The uncommon appearance of Kali is explained as a cause of her popularity. Kali is iconographically depicted as a "terrifying emaciated woman," with black skin, long tangled hair, red eyes and a long lolling tongue. She is naked barring a grim set of ornamentation: "a necklace of skulls or freshly decapitated heads, a skirt of severed arms and jewellery made from the corpses of infants." The "wildness" is a defining aspect of her character. The terrifying iconography of Kali is considered symbolic of her role as a protector and a bestower of freedom to devotees, of whom she shall take care if they come to her in the "attitude of a child." Devotional songs and poems that glorify the motherly nature of Kali are popular in Bengal, where she is most extensively worshipped.

In the Devi Mahatmya, where Kali first appeared as a personification of the rage of goddess Durga, an aspect of Kali's character was her thirst for blood and fondness to stay at places of death and destruction. In original depictions, Kali was often pictured in a cremation ground or battlefield standing on the corpse of Shiva, which symbolized her manifestation as Shakti. Kali represents the goddess embracing and encompassing the grim worldly realities of "blood, death and destruction".

The Kalika Purana describes Kali as "possessing a soothing dark complexion, as perfectly beautiful, riding a lion, four-armed, holding a sword and blue lotus, her hair unrestrained, body firm and youthful". The goddess has two depictions: the popular four-armed form and the ten-armed Mahakali avatar. In both, she is described as being black in colour, though she is often seen as blue in popular Indian art. Her eyes are described as red with intoxication and rage. Her hair is disheveled, small fangs sometimes protrude out of her mouth, and her tongue is lolling. Sometimes she dons a skirt made of demon arms and a garland of demon heads. Other times, she is seen wearing a tiger skin. She is also accompanied by serpents and a jackal while standing on the calm and prostrate Shiva, usually right foot forward to symbolize the more popular dakṣiṇācāra ("right-hand path"), as opposed to the more infamous and transgressive vamachara ("left-hand path"). Her mount, or vahana, is the lion.

=== Popular form ===
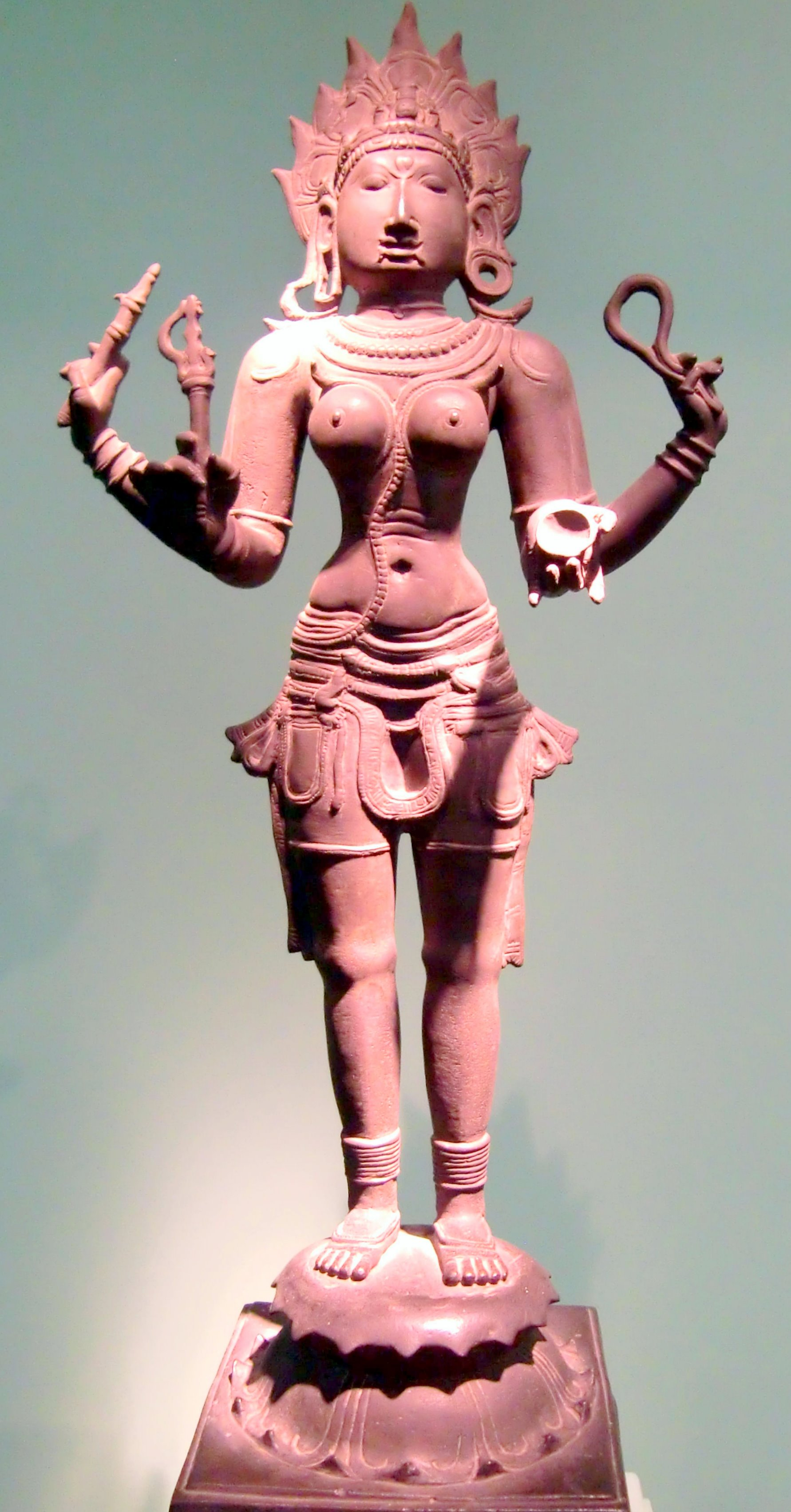
A Tamil depiction of Kali, 12th century, National Museum of India

Kali is depicted with four arms, which symbolize the circle of creation and dissolution. Her left hands are depicted holding a severed head and a sword. The sword signifies divine knowledge and the human head signifies human ego which must be slain by divine knowledge in order to attain moksha. The right hands are usually depicted in the abhaya (fearlessness) and varada (blessing) mudras, which means her initiated devotees (or anyone worshipping her with a true heart) will be saved as she will guide them here and in the hereafter.

She wears a garland of demon heads, variously enumerated at 108 (an auspicious number in Hinduism and the number of countable beads on a japa mala or rosary for repetition of mantras) or 51, which represents Varnamala or the Garland of letters of the Sanskrit alphabet, Devanagari. Hindus believe Sanskrit is a language of dynamism, and each of these letters represents a form of energy, or a form of Kali. Therefore, she is generally seen as the mother of language, and all mantras.

She is often depicted naked which symbolizes her being beyond the covering of Maya since she is pure (nirguna) being-consciousness-bliss and far above Prakriti. She is shown as very dark as she is Brahman in its supreme unmanifest state. She has no permanent qualities—she will continue to exist even when the universe ends. It is therefore believed that the concepts of color, light, good, and bad do not apply to her.

=== Mahakali ===
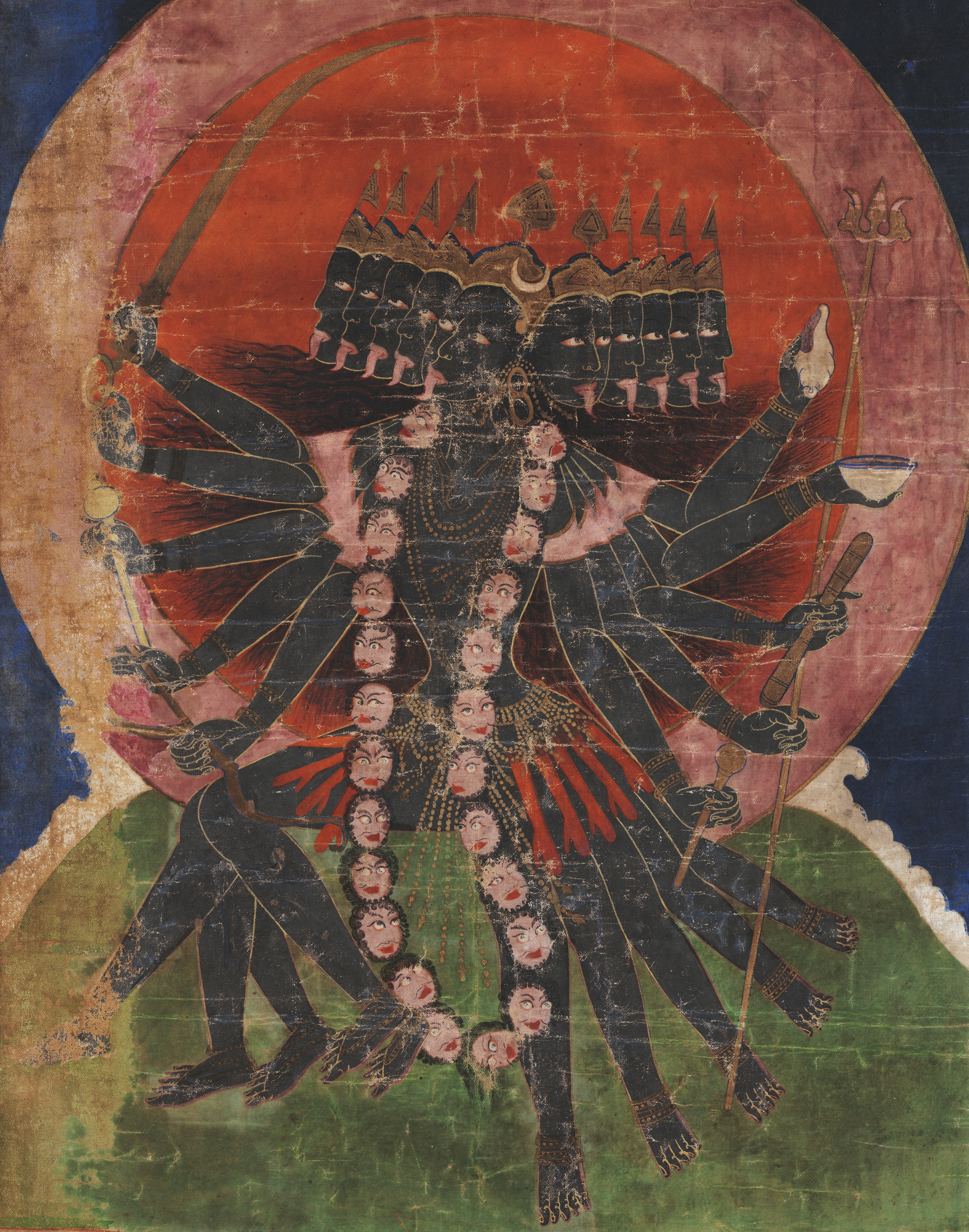
Mahakali, goddess of time and death, depicted with a black complexion with ten heads, arms and legs.

Mahakali (Sanskrit: Mahākālī, Devanagari: महाकाली, Bengali: মহাকালী, Gujarati: મહાકાળી), literally translated as "Great Kali", is sometimes considered as a greater form of Kali, identified with the Ultimate reality of Brahman. It can also be used as an honorific of the Goddess Kali,. Mahakali symbolizes absolute night and the power of time. She is depicted with five or ten heads, each with three eyes and holding different weapons. Mahakali is known as the origin of all things, her consort is Mahakala.

The Skanda Purana mentions that Kali took the form of Mahakali at the instruction of Shiva who wanted her to destroy the world during the time of universal destruction.

In the ten-armed form of Mahakali, she is depicted as shining like a blue stone. She has ten faces, ten feet, and three eyes for each head. She has ornaments decked on all her limbs. There is no association with Shiva.

=== Dakshinakali ===
Dakshinakali is the most popular form of Kali in Bengal. She is the benevolent mother, who protects her devotees and children from mishaps and misfortunes. There are various versions for the origin of the name Dakshinakali. Dakshina refers to the gift given to a priest before performing a ritual or to one's guru. Such gifts are traditionally given with the right hand. Dakshinakali's two right hands are usually depicted in gestures of blessing and giving of boons. One version of the origin of her name comes from the story of Yama, lord of death, who lives in the south (dakshina). When Yama heard Kali's name, he fled in terror, and so those who worship Kali are said to be able to overcome death itself.

Dakshinakali is typically shown with her right foot on Shiva's chest—while depictions showing Kali with her left foot on Shiva's chest depict the even more fearsome Vamakali. Vamakali is usually worshipped by non-householders.

The pose shows the conclusion of an episode in which Kali was rampaging out of control after destroying many demons. Vishnu confronted Kali in an attempt to cool her down. She was unable to see beyond the limitless power of her rage and Vishnu had to move out of her way. Seeing this the devas became more fearful, afraid that in her rampage, Kali would not stop until she destroyed the entire universe. Shiva saw only one solution to prevent Kali's endless destruction. Shiva lay down on the battlefield so that Goddess Mahakali would have to step on him. When she saw her consort under her foot, Kali realized that she had gone too far. Filled with grief for the damage she had done, her blood-red tongue hung from her mouth, calming her down. In some interpretations of the story, Shiva was attempting to receive Kali's grace by receiving her foot on his chest.

Rachel Fell McDermott finds that in the Mahabhagavata Purana, Shiva is portrayed as "the devotee who falls at [Kali's] feet in devotion, in the surrender of his ego, or in hopes of gaining moksha by her touch." In fact, Shiva is said to have become so enchanted by Kali that he performed austerities to win her, and having received the treasure of her feet, held them against his heart in reverence.

The popularity of the worship of the Dakshinakali form of Kali is often attributed to Krishnananda Agamavagisha. He was a noted 17th-century Bengali Tantra thinker and author of Tantrasara. Kali reportedly appeared to him in a dream and told him to popularize her in a particular form that would appear to him the following day. The next morning he observed a young woman making cow dung patties. While placing a patty on a wall, she stood in the alidha pose, with her right foot forward. When she saw Krishnananda watching her, she was embarrassed and put her tongue between her teeth, Agamavagisha realized that this was the divine form of Kali he was looking for. Krishnananda Agamavagisha was also the guru of the Kali devotee and poet Ramprasad Sen.

=== Samhara Kali ===
Samhara Kali, also called Vama Kali, is the embodiment of the power of destruction. The chief goddess of Tantric texts, Samhara Kali is the most dangerous and powerful form of Kali. Samhara Kali takes form when Kali steps out with her left foot holding her sword in her right hand. She is the Kali of death, destruction and is worshipped by tantrics. As Samhara Kali she gives death and liberation. According to the Mahakala Samhita, Samhara Kali is two armed and black in complexion. She stands on a corpse and holds a freshly cut head and a plate to collect the dripping blood. She is worshipped by warriors, tantrics – the followers of Tantra.

=== Other forms ===
Other forms of Kali popularly worshipped in Bengal include Raksha Kali (form of Kali worshipped for protection against epidemics and drought), Bhadra Kali and Guhya Kali. Kali is said to have 8, 12, or 21 different forms according to different traditions. The popular forms are Adya Kali, Chintamani Kali, Sparshamani Kali, Santati Kali, Siddhi Kali, Dakshina Kali, Bhadra Kali, Adharvana Bhadra Kali, Smashana Kali, Rakta Kali, Kamakala Kali, Guhya Kali, Hamsa Kali, Shyama Kali, and Kalasankarshini Kali. In Gujarat, Khodiyar is a regional form of Mahakali.

== Symbolism ==
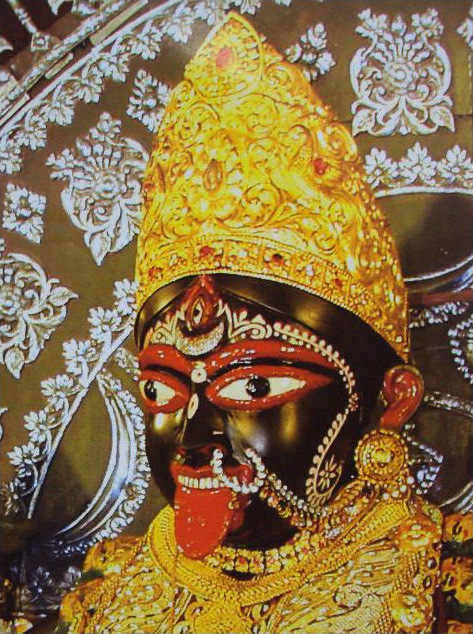
In Bengal and Odisha, Kali's extended tongue is widely seen as expressing embarrassment over the realization that her foot is on her husband's chest. Above: idol of Kali at the Dakshineshwar Kali Temple.

Interpretations of the symbolic meanings of Kali's appearance vary depending on Tantric or devotional approach, and on whether one views her image in a symbolic, allegorical or mystical fashion. There are many varied depictions of the different forms of Kali. The most common form shows her with four arms and hands, showing aspects of both creation and destruction. The two right hands are often held out in blessing, one in a mudra saying "fear not" (abhayamudra), the other conferring boons. Her left hands hold a severed head and blood-covered sword. The sword severs the bondage of ignorance and ego (tamas), represented by the severed head. One interpretation of Kali's tongue is that the red tongue symbolizes the rajasic nature being conquered by the white (symbolizing sattvic) nature of the teeth. Her blackness represents that she is nirguna, beyond all qualities of nature, and transcendent. Kali's lolling tongue is interpreted as her being angry, enraged; while many in India interpret it as "biting the tongue" in shame.

The most widespread interpretation of Kali's extended tongue involve her embarrassment over the sudden realization that she has stepped on her husband's chest. Kali's sudden "modesty and shame" over that act is the prevalent interpretation among Odia Hindus. The biting of the tongue conveys the emotion of lajja or modesty, an expression that is widely accepted as the emotion being expressed by Kali. In Bengal also, Kali's protruding tongue is "widely accepted... as a sign of speechless embarrassment: a gesture very common among Bengalis."

The twin earrings of Kali are small embryos. This is because Kali likes devotees who have childlike qualities in them. The forehead of Kali is seen to be as luminous as the full moon and eternally giving out ambrosia.

Kali is often shown standing with her right foot on Shiva's chest. This represents an episode where Kali was out of control on the battlefield, such that she was about to destroy the entire universe. Shiva pacified her by lying down under her foot to pacify and calm her. Shiva is sometimes shown with a blissful smile on his face. She is typically shown with a garland of severed heads, often numbering fifty. This can symbolize the letters of the Sanskrit alphabet and therefore as the primordial sound of Aum from which all creation proceeds. The severed arms which make up her skirt represent her devotee's karma that she has taken on.

There are several interpretations of the symbolism behind the commonly represented image of Kali standing on Shiva's supine form. A common interpretation is that Shiva symbolizes purusha, the universal unchanging aspect of reality, or pure consciousness. Kali represents Prakriti, nature or matter, sometimes seen as having a feminine quality of creation of life. The merging of these two qualities represent ultimate reality.

A tantric interpretation sees Shiva as consciousness and Kali as power or energy. Consciousness and energy are dependent upon each other, since Shiva depends on Shakti, or energy, in order to fulfill his role in creation, preservation, and destruction. In this view, without Shakti, Shiva is a corpse—unable to act.

== Worship ==
=== Mantras ===
Kali is closely associated with transcendent knowledge and is regarded as the first of the ten Mahavidyas, an amalgamation of goddesses who provide liberating knowledge. Kali is primarily worshipped in the Kalikula worship tradition. The closest way of direct worship is to the forms of Mahakali or Bhadrakali (Bhadra in Sanskrit means 'gentle'). One mantra for Kali worship is:

सर्वमङ्गलमाङ्गल्ये शिवे सर्वार्थसाधिके । शरण्ये त्र्यम्बके गौरि नारायणि नमोऽस्तु ते ॥
ॐ जयंती मंगला काली भद्रकाली कपालिनी । दुर्गा क्षमा शिवा धात्री स्वाहा स्वधा नमोऽस्तु‍ते ॥

Translation:

Sarvamangal-māngalyē śivē sarvārthasādhikē. Śaraṇyē tryambakē Gauri nārāyaṇi namō'stu tē.
Oṃ jayantī mangala kālī bhadrakālī kapālinī . Durgā kṣamā śivā dhātrī svāhā svadhā namō'stu‍tē.
ॐ काली काली महाकाली कालिके परमेश्वरी । सर्वानन्दकरी देवी नारायणि नमोऽस्तुते ।।

=== Tantra ===
Kali Yantra

In Tantrism the cause of reality is the mutual interaction between male and female or Shiva and Shakti. As a result, goddesses play an important role in the study and practice of Tantra Yoga and are essential in understanding the nature of reality. Kali is often mentioned in Tantric iconography, texts and rituals even though Parvati received Shiva's wisdom in the form of Tantras. Kali is revered as the highest reality or greatest of all deities in many Tantric texts. The Niruttara-tantra and the Picchila-tantra state that among all mantras Kali's mantras are the greatest. The Kdmadd-tantra mentions that Kali is sacciddnanda or imperishable bliss and Brahman. In other texts like theYogini-tantra, Kamakhya-tantra and the Niruttara-tantra Kali is referred to as an essential form of Mahadevi.

In Tantric practice, Kali's figure represents death itself. The Karpuradi-stotra, dated to approximately 10th century CE, describes the Pancatattva ritual which is performed on cremation grounds (Samahana-sadhan). It states that a sadhaka that meditates on the terrible aspects of Kali's form and confronts her can attain salvation.

The Karpuradi-stotra also describes Kali's gentler form that is young, with a smiling face and with two right hands to dispel fear and offer boons. She is also described as the supreme being of the universe. In this benign form, Kali becomes the goddess who grants salvation when fear is overcome and goes from being a symbol of death to being a symbol of triumph over death.

=== In Bengali tradition ===
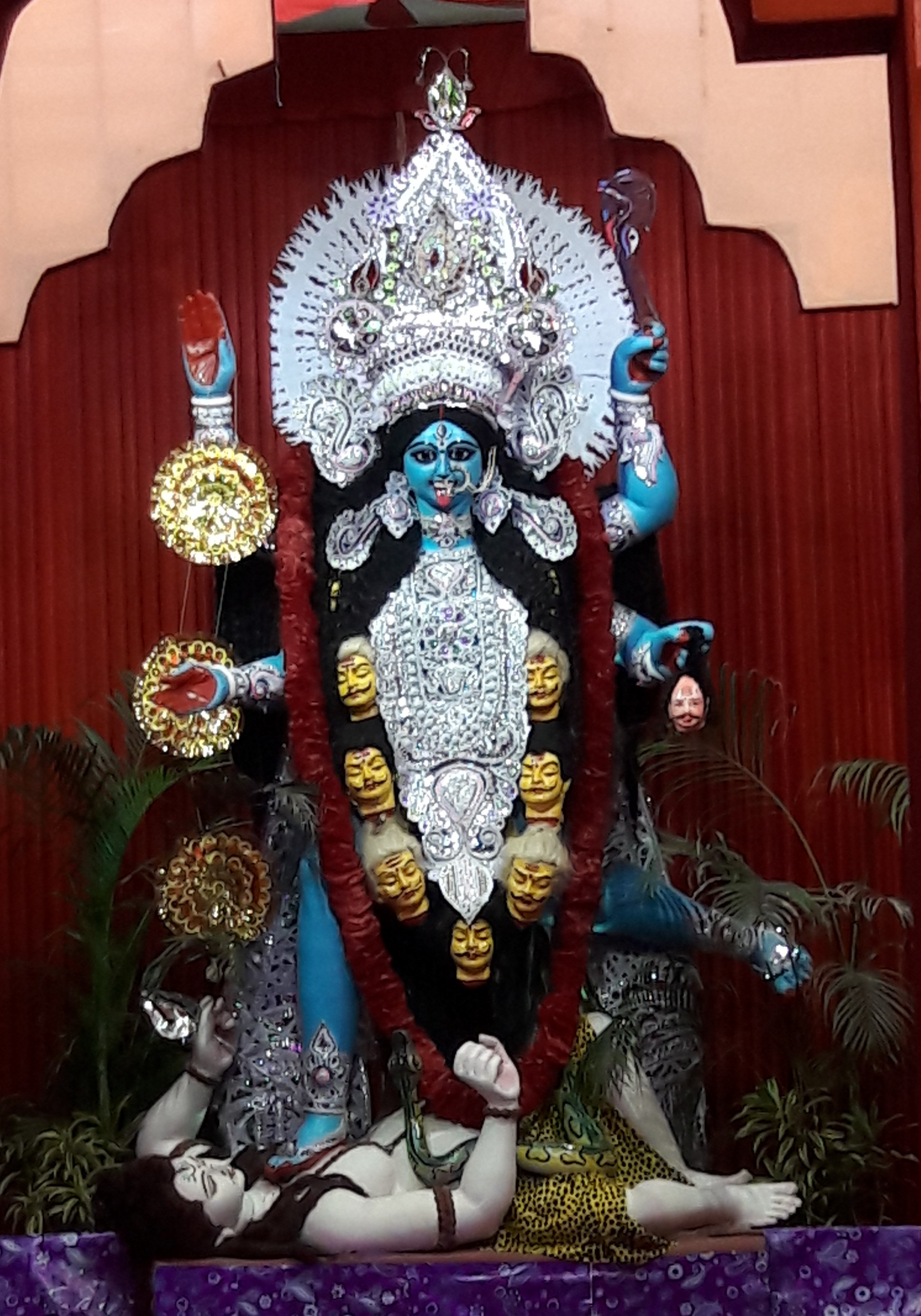
Statue of Kali trampling on Shiva, worshipped in Bengal

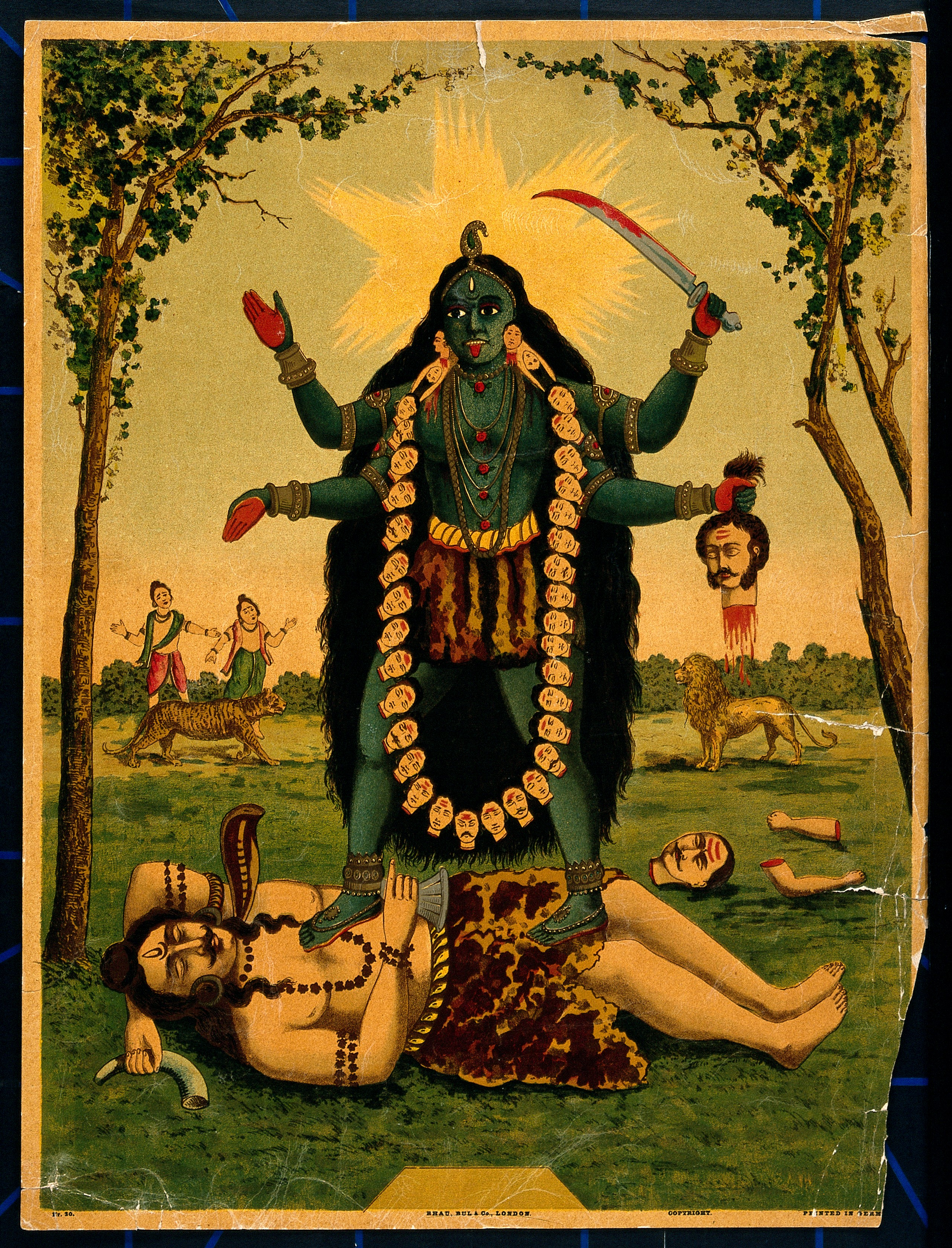
Kali standing triumphantly over Shiva, painting

Kali is a central figure in late medieval Bengal devotional literature, with such notable devotee poets as Kamalakanta Bhattacharya (1769–1821) and Ramprasad Sen (1718–1775). With the exception of being associated with Parvati as Shiva's consort, Kāli is rarely pictured in Hindu legends and iconography as a motherly figure until Bengali devotions beginning in the early eighteenth century. Even in Bengāli tradition her appearance and habits change little, if at all.

The Tantric approach to Kāli is to display courage by confronting her on cremation grounds in the dead of night, despite her terrible appearance. In contrast, the Bengali devotee adopts the attitude of a child, coming to love her unreservedly. In both cases, the goal of the devotee is to become reconciled with death and to learn acceptance of the way that things are. These themes are addressed in Rāmprasād's work. Rāmprasād comments in many of his other songs that Kāli is indifferent to his wellbeing, causes him to suffer, brings his worldly desires to nothing and his worldly goods to ruin. He also states that she does not behave like a mother should and that she ignores his pleas.

To be a child of Kāli, Rāmprasād asserts, is to be denied of earthly delights and pleasures. Kāli is said to refrain from giving that which is expected. To the devotee, it is perhaps her very refusal to do so that enables her devotees to reflect on dimensions of themselves and of reality that go beyond the material world.

A significant portion of Bengali devotional music features Kāli as its central theme and is known as Shyama Sangeet.

Kāli is especially venerated in the festival of Kali Puja in eastern India – celebrated when the new moon day of Ashwin month coincides with the festival of Diwali. The practice of animal sacrifice is still practiced during Kali Puja in Bengal, Orissa, and Assam, though it is rare outside of those areas. The Hindu temples where this takes place involves the ritual slaying of goats, chickens and sometimes male water buffalos. Throughout India, the practice is becoming less common. The rituals in eastern India temples where animals are killed are generally led by Brahmin priests. A number of Tantric Puranas specify the ritual for how the animal should be killed. A Brahmin priest will recite a mantra in the ear of the animal to be sacrificed, in order to free the animal from the cycle of life and death. Groups such as People for Animals continue to protest animal sacrifice based on court rulings forbidding the practice in some locations.

=== In Tantric Buddhism ===
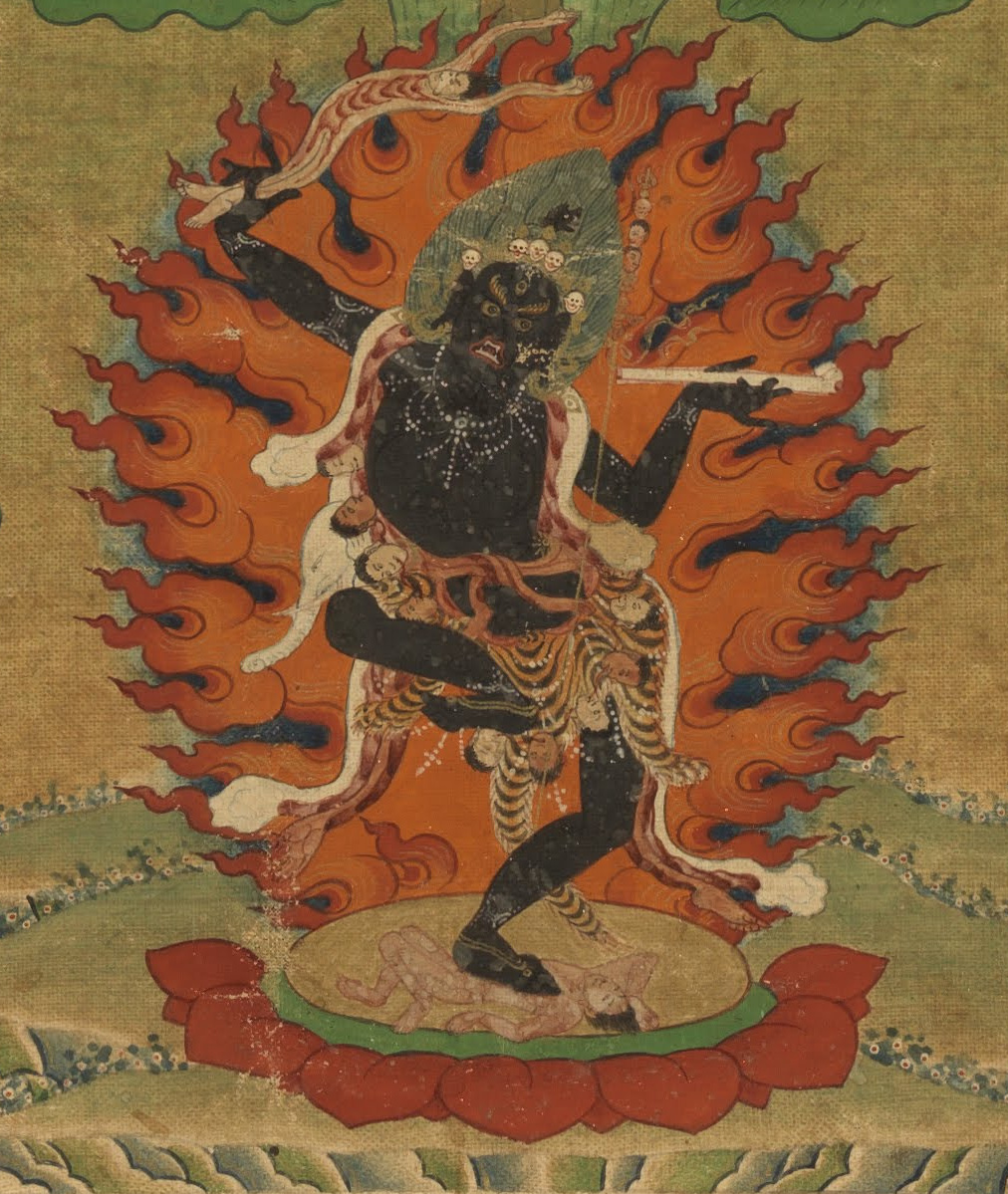
Tröma Nagmo, in Tibetan Buddhism, shares some attributes of Kali

Tantric Kali cults such as the Kaula and Krama had a strong influence on Tantric Buddhism, as can be seen in fierce-looking yoginis and dakinis such as Vajrayogini and Krodikali.

In Tibet, Krodikali (alt. Krodhakali, Kālikā, Krodheśvarī, Krishna Krodhini) is known as Tröma Nagmo (Classical Tibetan: ཁྲོ་མ་ནག་མོ་, Wylie: khro ma nag mo, English: "The Black Wrathful Lady"). She features as a key deity in the practice tradition of Chöd founded by Machig Labdron and is seen as a fierce form of Vajrayogini. Other similar fierce deities include the dark blue Ugra Tara and the lion-faced Simhamukha.

=== In Sinhala Buddhism ===
In Sinhala Buddhism, Kali's origin is explained through her arriving at Munneśvaram from South India, eating humans, and attempting to eat Pattini, who instead tames her.

She is regarded as having seven forms; Bhadrakāli, Mahābhadrakāli, Pēnakāli, Vandurukāli (Hanumāpatrakāli), Rīrikāli, Sohonkāli, and Ginikāli. These forms are subordinate to Kāliammā (the mother of Kāli). Red flowers, silver coins, blood, and oil lamps with mustard oil are offered to her, and as Pattini's servant, she accepts offerings on her behalf.

Her worship in Sri Lanka dates back to at least the 9th century CE, and Dharmasena Thera created the Sadharma Ratnavaliya in the 13th century based on an older 5th century work, which actively recontextualizes Kali in a Buddhist context, exploring the nature of violence and vengeance and how they trap people in cycles until justification, guilt, and good and evil become irrelevant. Kali has been seen as both a demon (though a tamed one, thanks to Pattini) and a goddess in Sri Lanka. She and mythical Sinhala Buddhist kings both use demonic fury as a necessary condition of conquest.

Yantras are used in relation to her, sourced from the Pali Canon, later Buddhist paritta chants, and from non-Buddhist yantras and mantras. The Sādhakayantra is popular, and its corresponding mantra includes Arabic words and Islamic concepts.

=== Worship in the Western world ===
==== Theorized early worship ====
A form of Kali worship may have already been transmitted to the west in medieval times by the wandering Romani. A few authors have drawn parallels between Kali worship and the ceremonies of the annual pilgrimage in honor of Saint Sarah, also known as Sara-la-Kali ("Sara the Black", Romani: Sara e Kali), held at Saintes-Maries-de-la-Mer, a place of pilgrimage for Roma in the Camargue, in southern France. Ronald Lee (2001) notes that the similarities in the ceremonies performed at the shrine of Sainte Sara indicate that Kali/Durga worship have been incorporated to a Christian figure.

==== In modern times ====
An academic study of modern-day western Kali enthusiasts noted that, "as shown in the histories of all cross-cultural religious transplants, Kali devotionalism in the West must take on its own indigenous forms if it is to adapt to its new environment." Rachel Fell McDermott, Professor of Asian and Middle Eastern Cultures at Columbia University and author of several books on Kali, has noted the evolving views in the West regarding Kali and her worship. In 1998 McDermott wrote that feminists and New Age spiritualists are drawn to Kali because they perceive her to be a symbol of repressed female power, sexuality, and healing but that this is a misinterpretation which stems from a lack of knowledge about Hindu religious tradition. By 2003, she amended this view stating that cross-cultural borrowing should be done thoughtfully and is natural due to religious globalization. She further stated that Kali enthusiasts since the early 1990s had sought to take on a more informed approach by incorporating more Indian perspective of her character than feminist and New Age interpretations.

The emergence of Kali in the modern times as an image of significance for many women, both Hindu and non-Hindu, has been noteworthy. Since the late twentieth century, various feminist movements in the West have associated Kali with women's empowerment. New age religious and spiritual movements have found in the iconographic representations and mythological stories of Kali an inspiration for theological and sexual liberation.

==== In Réunion ====
In Réunion, an island territory of France in the Indian Ocean, veneration for Saint Expeditus (French: Saint Expédit) is very popular. The Malbars have Tamil ancestry but are, at least nominally, Catholics. The saint is identified with Kali.

== Comparative scholarship ==
Scholar Marvin H. Pope in 1965 argues that the Hindu goddess Kali, who is first attested in the 7th century CE, shares some characteristics with some ancient Near Eastern goddesses, such as wearing a necklace of heads and a belt of severed hands like Anat, and drinking blood like the Egyptian goddess Sekhmet and that therefore that her character might have been influenced by them.

=== Levantine Anat ===
The Bronze Age epic cycles of the Levantine city of Ugarit include a myth according to which the warrior goddess Anat started attacking warriors, with the text of the myth describing the goddess as gloating and her heart filling with joy and her liver with laughter while attaching the heads of warriors to her back and girding hands to her waist until she is pacified by a message of peace sent by her brother and consort, the god Baʿlu.

The Hindu goddess Kali similarly wore a necklace of severed heads and a girdle of severed hands, and was pacified by her consort, Śiva, throwing himself under her feet. The sickle sword wielded by Kali might also have been connected to similar sickle swords used in early dynastic Mesopotamia.

=== Egyptian Sekhmet ===
According to an Ancient Egyptian myth, called The Deliverance of Mankind from Destruction, the ancient Egyptian supreme god, the Sun-god Ra, suspected that mankind was plotting against him, and so he sent the goddess Hathor, who was the incarnation of his violent feminine aspect, the Eye of Ra, to destroy his enemies.

Furthermore, Hathor appeared as the lion-goddess Sekhmet and carried out Ra's orders until she became so captured by her blood-lust that she would not stop despite Ra himself becoming distressed and wishing an end to the killing. Therefore, Ra concocted a ruse whereby a plain was flooded with beer which had been dyed red, which Sekhmet mistook for blood and drank until she became too inebriated to continue killing, thus saving humanity from destruction.

Similarly, while killing demons, Kālī became ecstatic with the joy of battle and slaughter and refused to stop, so that the Devas feared she would destroy the world, and she was stopped through ruse when her consort Śiva threw himself under her feet.

== In popular culture ==
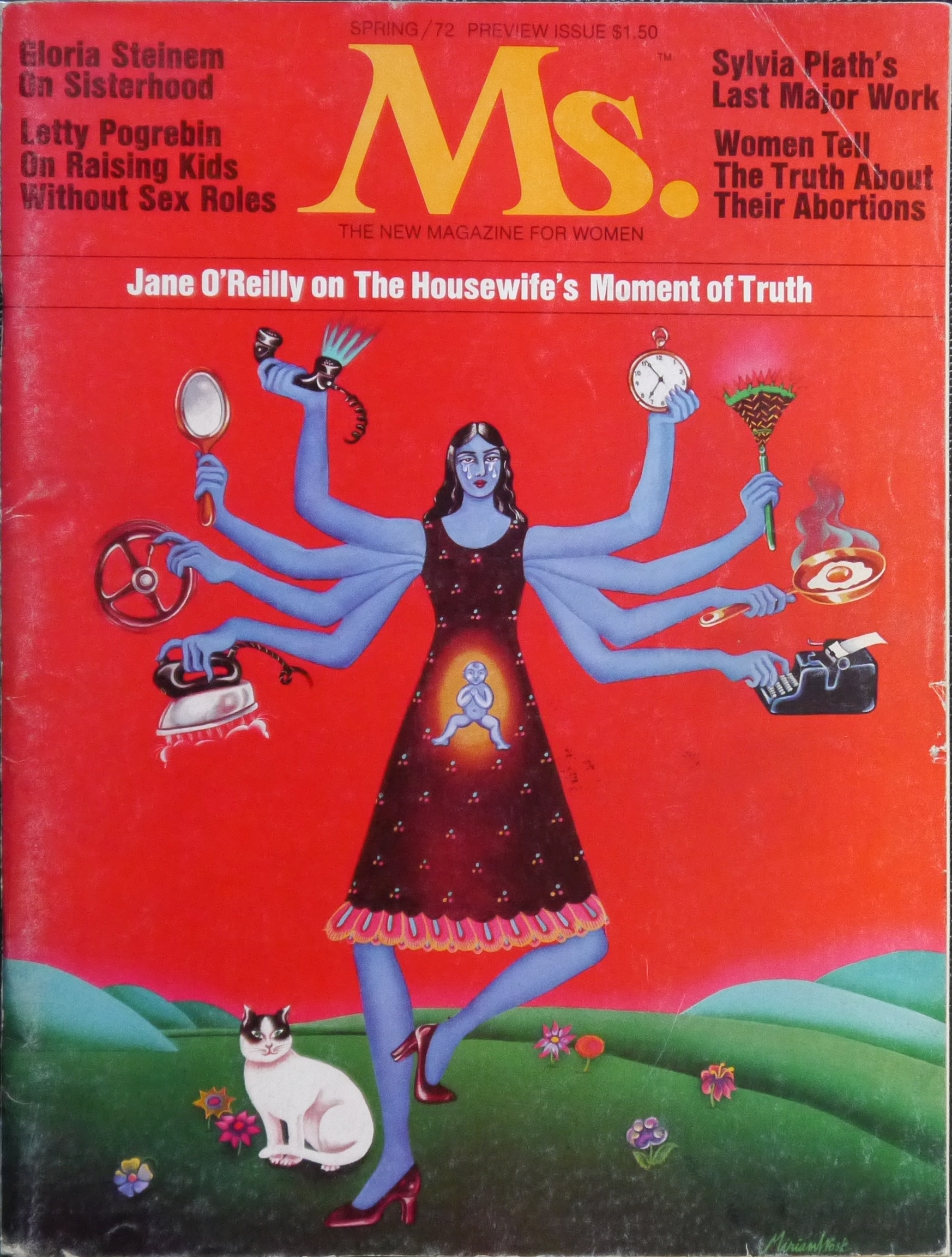
Ms. magazine cover, 1972

A 1939 American adventure film, Gunga Din, features a resurgent sect of Thugs as worshippers of Kali who are at war with the British Raj. In the Beatles' 1965 film Help!, Ringo Starr is pursued by Kali worshippers intending to sacrifice him. In Indiana Jones and the Temple of Doom (1984), an action-adventure film which takes place in 1935, a Thuggee cult of Kali worshippers are villains. An Indian television series, Mahakali — Anth Hi Aarambh Hai (2017), has Parvati (Mahakali), Shiva's consort, assuming varied forms to destroy evil and protect the innocent.

A modern version of Kali was featured on the cover of the first issue of feminist magazine Ms., published in 1972, with Kali's arms symbolizing the many tasks of the contemporary American woman. The tongue and lips logo of the band The Rolling Stones, created in 1971, was inspired by the stuck-out tongue of Kali.
