= Raktabīja =

Asura in Hinduism

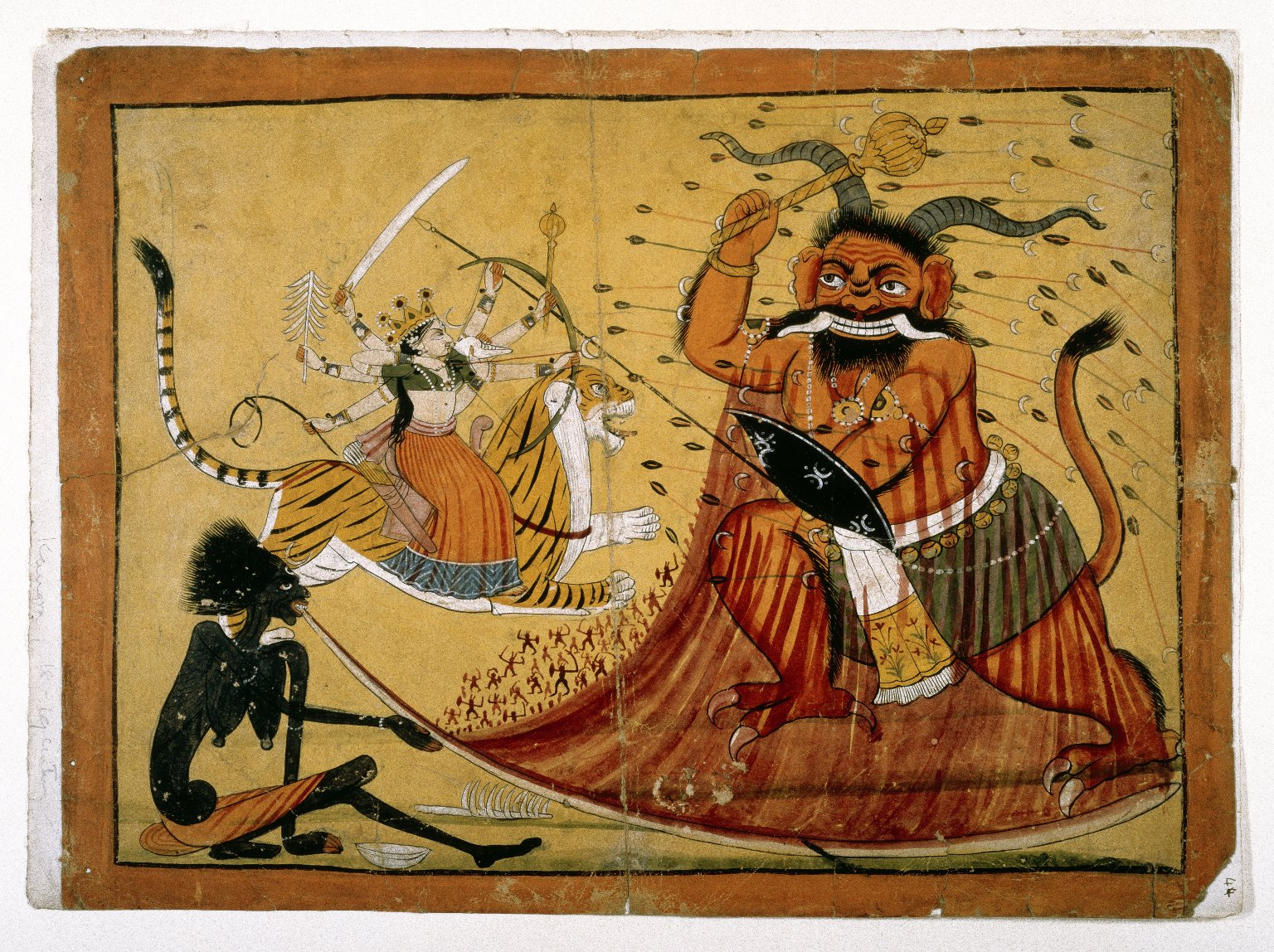
- Durga attacks Raktabīja and Kali drinks his spilt blood.
- Affiliation: Asura
- Predecessor: Rambha
- Texts: Puranas

Genealogy
- Siblings: Mahishasura

Raktabīja (Sanskrit: रक्तबीज, lit. 'blood seed', IAST: Raktabīja) is an asura in Hinduism. According to the Puranas, he fought with Shumbha and Nishumbha against the goddesses Kali and Chandi, both forms of Durga. Raktabīja secured from Shiva a boon according to which if one drop of blood from his body fell on the battlefield, many Raktabījas would arise from the blood and fight the enemies. Each of these Raktabījas would also be like the others in the matter of strength, form, and weapons.

Durga fights the army of Raktabīja.

== Legend ==
=== Origin ===
According to the Puranas, there was an asura king called Danu. His two sons, Rambha and Karambha did Tapas at Pañcanada for the blessing of having children.

Rambha, standing amidst five fires, meditated on Agni, and Karambha, standing in the river's water, meditated on Varuna. When Indra found out about this, he decided to kill them. In the guise of a crocodile, Indra dragged Karambha away by the feet and killed him by drowning him. Then Indra went after Rambha, but Rambha was saved by Agni. Sad at the death of his brother, Rambha decided to cut off his head and offer it as a sacrifice. When he was about to do so, Agni appeared and blocked him and promised to grant him whatever he desired.

Accordingly, Rambha requested Agni for a son more effulgent than Agni, who would conquer the Three Worlds and would not be defeated even by the Deva and the Asuras. Rambha further wanted that son to be as powerful as Vāyu, exceptionally handsome, and skilled in archery. Agni blessed Rambha that he would have, as desired, a son by the woman whom he coveted.

On his way back home, Rambha saw a beautiful she-buffalo, called Shyamala, which he married. He took the pregnant buffalo to Patala to protect it from being attacked by other buffaloes. One day, another buffalo felt a passion for Rambha's wife, and in the fight, Rambha was impaled with the buffalo's horns, killing him. Later, the water buffalo was killed by Rambha's soldiers. Rambha's wife died after jumping into his funeral pyre. The very powerful Mahishasura was born from that fire. Rambha also rose from the fire with his son Mahisha in the name of Raktabija.

Raktabīja secured from Shiva a boon according to which if one drop of blood from his body fell on the battlefield, many Raktabījas would arise from the blood and fight the enemies. Each of these Raktabījas would also be like the others in the matter of strength, form, and weapons.

=== Battle ===
The eighth chapter of the Devi Mahatmya narrates Durga's battle with Raktabīja as a part of her battle against the demons Shumbha and Nishumbha, who had suspended the devas from Svarga. After the deaths of Dhumralochana, and Chanda and Munda, Shumbha sent Raktabīja to fight. Raktabīja was wounded, but his drops of blood falling on the ground created innumerable other Raktabījas, and hence Durga and the Matrikas struggled to defeat them. Durga gave following instruction to Kali:

O Cāmuṇḍā! as soon as my arrow wounded Raktabija, drink the blood that scatters from him immediately. You may also kill and devour the demons to your heart's content. Watch as I kill the demons right now with my weapons. Do not allow even a single drop of blood to fall upon the earth. There is no other way to destroy them but this.'

— Devi Bhagavata Purana, Book 5, Chapter 29

Ultimately, even as every drop of the blood that streamed from the asura was consumed by Kali, Raktabīja was beheaded by Durga's sword.

According to popular folklore, after killing Raktabīja and most of his entire army, the goddess Kali went on to kill all creatures in a fury, Then Siva lay in her path. when Kali stepped on his chest, she was shaken and embarrassed, and stuck out her tongue. This act has been depicted in many Hindu paintings and portraits.

There are references of Kali not being created, but having sprung from Durga's forehead, as they were all the same goddess in different forms.

== See also ==
- Rambha (asura)
- Chanda and Munda
- Shumbha and Nishumbha
- Mahishasura
