= Chanda and Munda =

Asuras in Hinduism

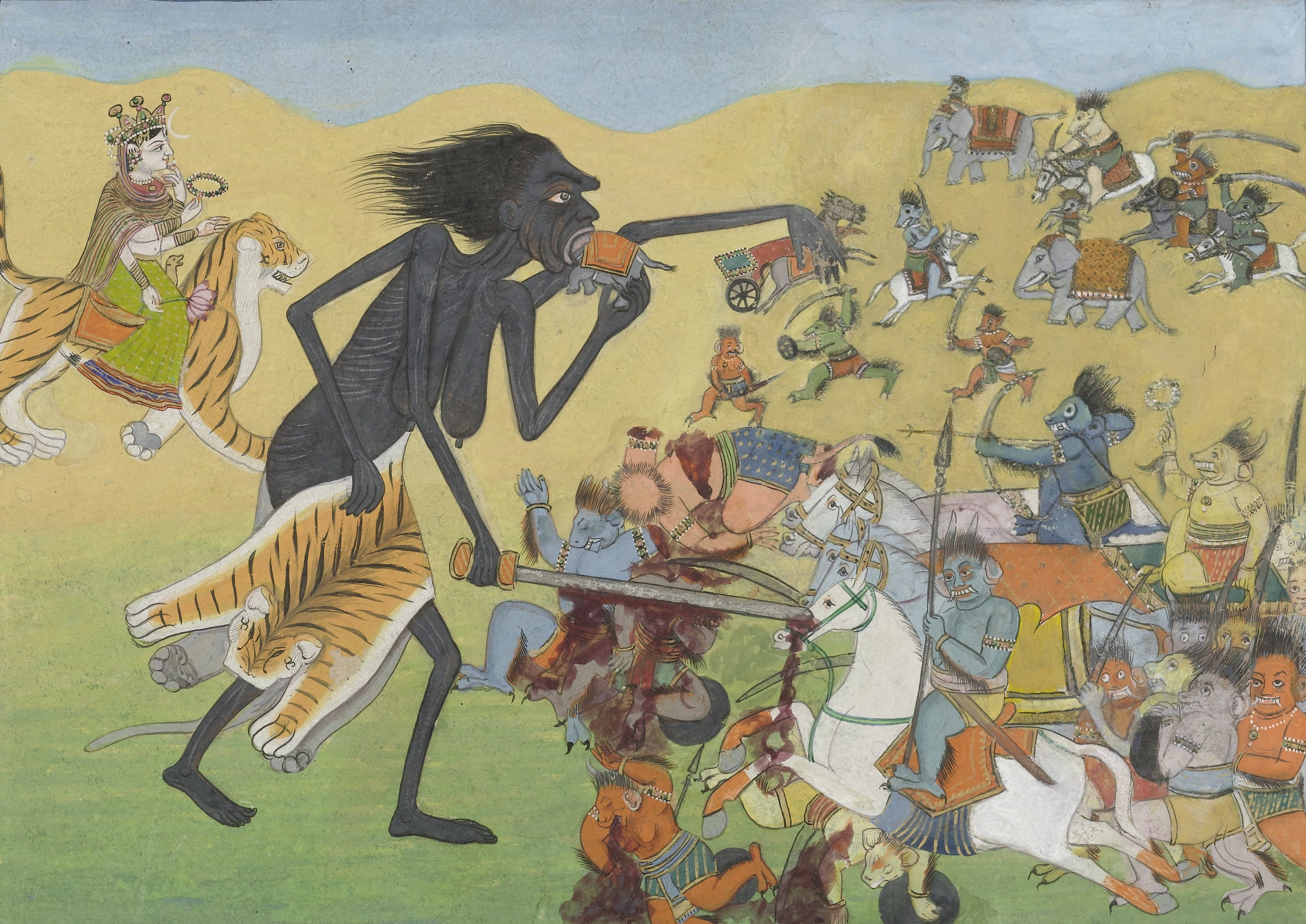
A Pahari depiction of Kali fighting Chanda and Munda: Kali Fights Demons Chanda and Munda; c. 1825–35, gouache on paper, 17 × 24 cm, Rijksmuseum.

According to Devi Mahatmya, Chanda and Munda are two asuras (demons) servants of Shumbha and Nishumbha.

One day, Chanda and Munda saw the beauty of the goddess Kaushiki, an incarnation of Parvati, and they informed their masters about it. Shumbha desired to marry her. First, he sent a messenger named Sugriva to convey his desire to the goddess. When that failed, Shumbha's general, Dhumralochana, took over the mission.

After the general was killed, Shumbha sent Chanda and Munda to fight the goddess. Then the terrifying figure Kali emerged from the goddess's forehead to kill Chanda and Munda. Since she had slain Chanda and Munda, Kali earned the name "Chamunda". Afterwards, they sent the demon Raktabīja, who was also slain by Kali. Skanda Purana, said that Chanda and Munda worshipped Surya.

== See also ==
- Rambha (asura)
- Raktabīja
- Shumbha and Nishumbha
- Mahishasura
- Dhumralochana
- Sugriva (asura)
