= Mahishasura =

Bovine asura slain by the goddess Durga

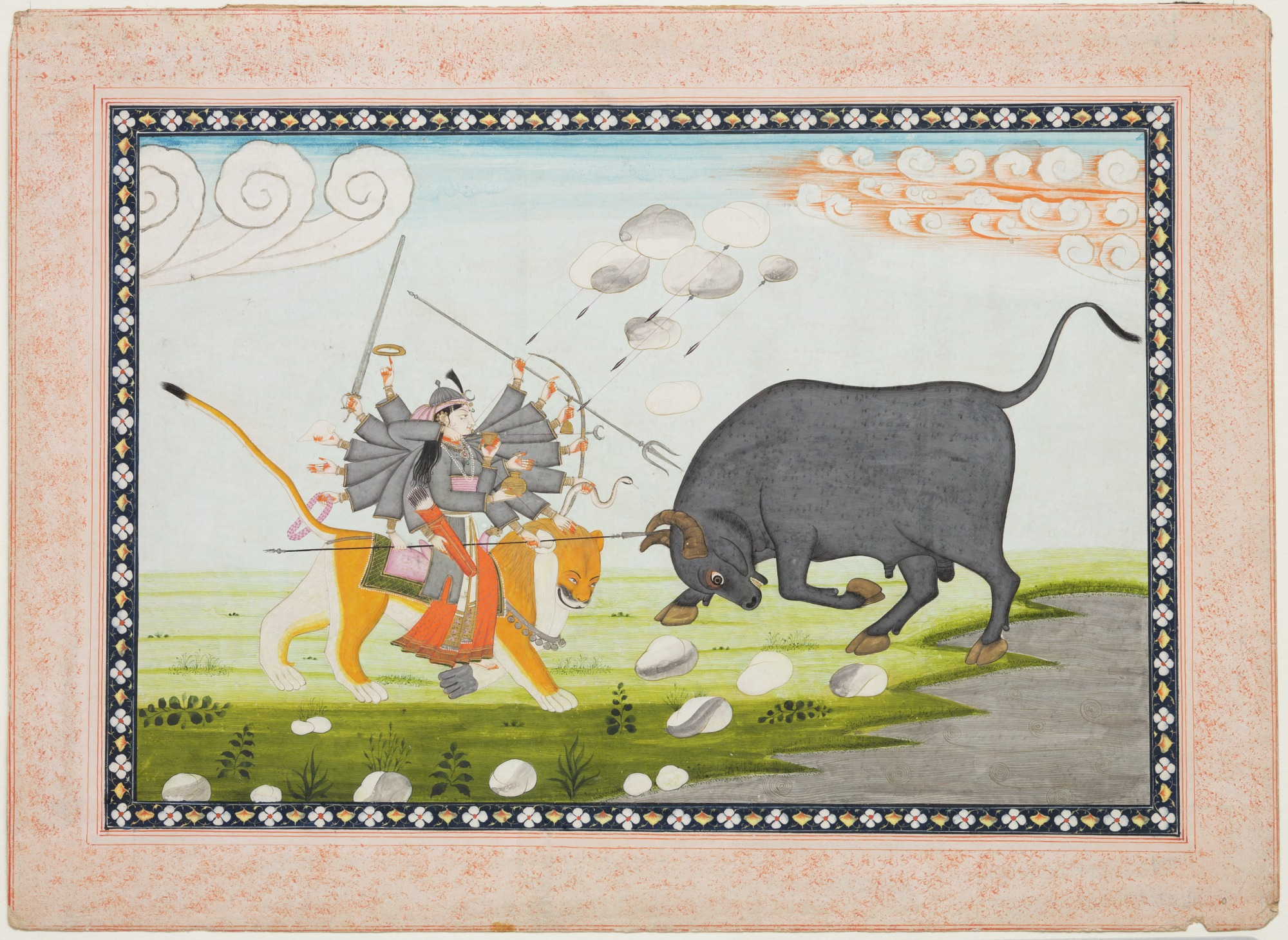
- 19th-century painting of Durga fighting Mahishasura
- Affiliation: Asura
- Texts: Puranas

Genealogy
- Parents: Rambha (father)
- Children: Gajasura

Mahishasura (Sanskrit: महिषासुर, IAST: Mahiṣāsura) is a bovine asura in Hinduism. He is depicted in Hindu literature as a deceitful demon who pursued his evil ways by shape-shifting. Mahishasura was the son of the asura Rambha and the brother of buffalo-demoness named Mahishi. He was ultimately killed by the goddess Durga with her trishula (trident), after which she gained the epithet Mahishasuramardini ("Slayer of Mahishasura"). Mahishasura had a son named Gajasura.

The Navaratri ("Nine Nights") festival eulogises this battle between Mahishasura and Durga, culminating in Vijayadashami, a celebration of his ultimate defeat. This story of the "triumph of good over evil" carries profound symbolism in Hinduism, particularly Shaktism, and is both narrated as well as reenacted from the Devi Mahatmya at many South and Southeast Asian Hindu temples.

The Mahishasura Mardini Stotra by Adi Shankara was written to commemorate her legend.

== Legend ==
Artwork depicting the goddess Durga slaying the buffalo demon Mahishasura is found all over India, Nepal and southeast Asia.

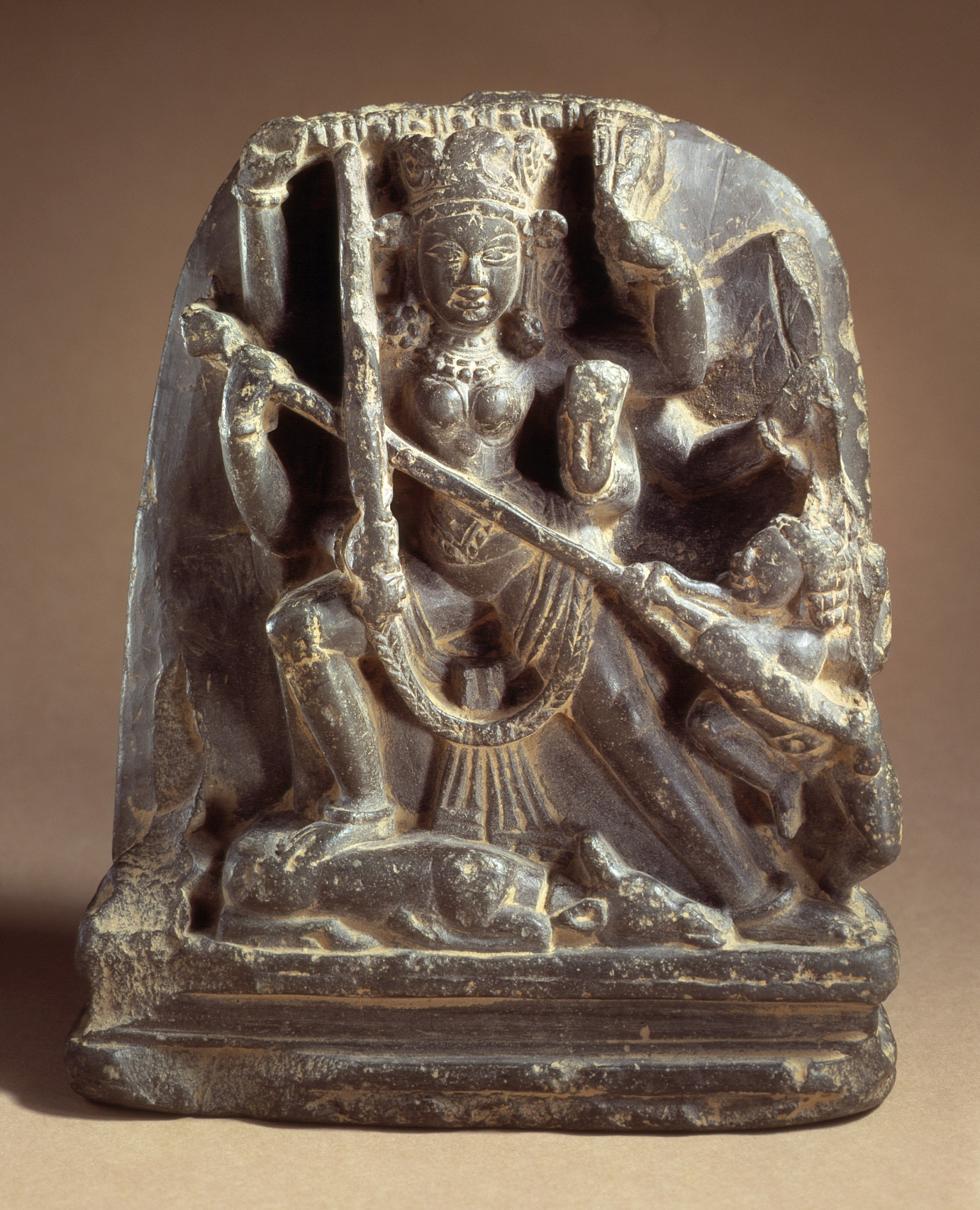
9th-century Kashmir

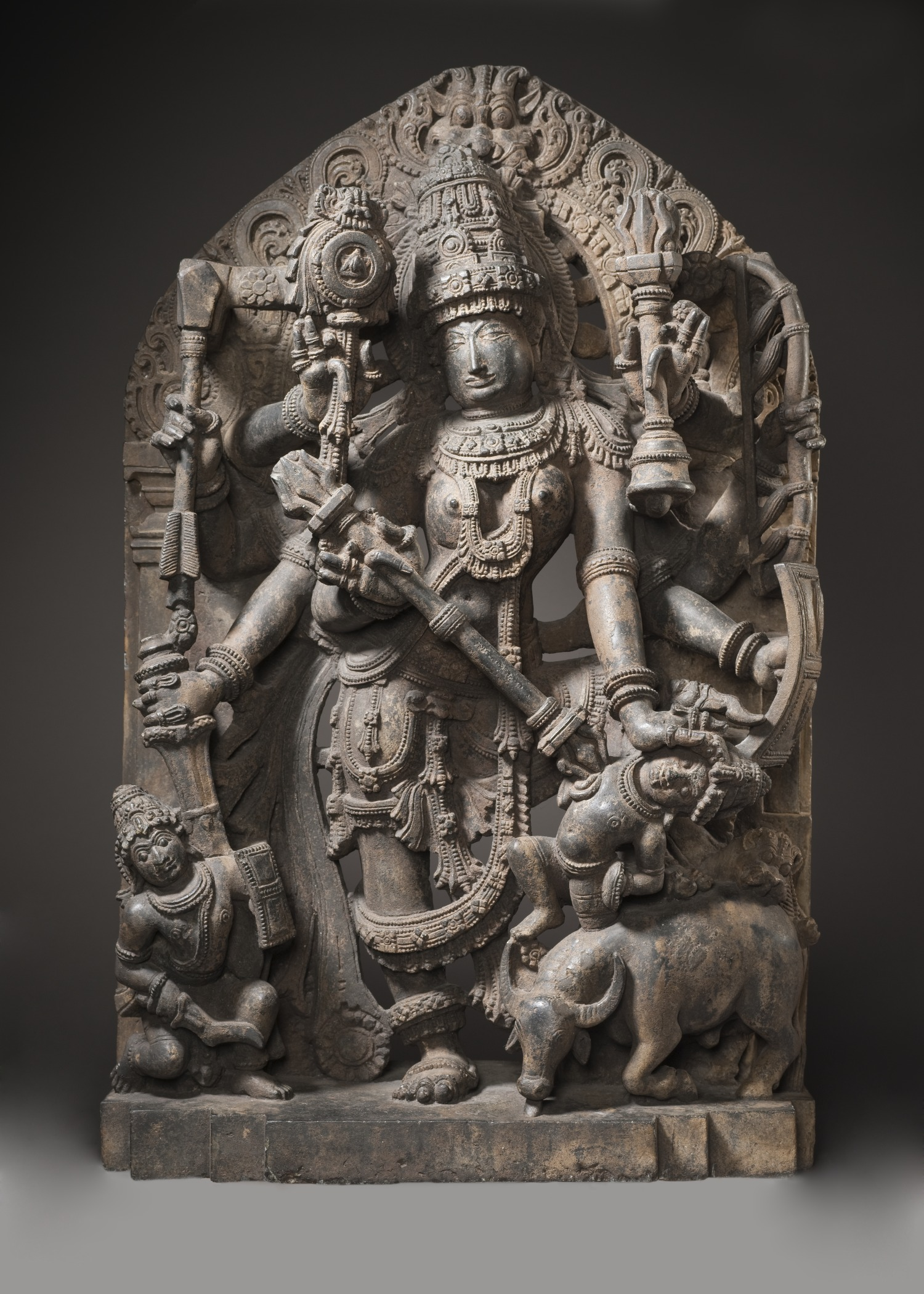
13th-century Karnataka

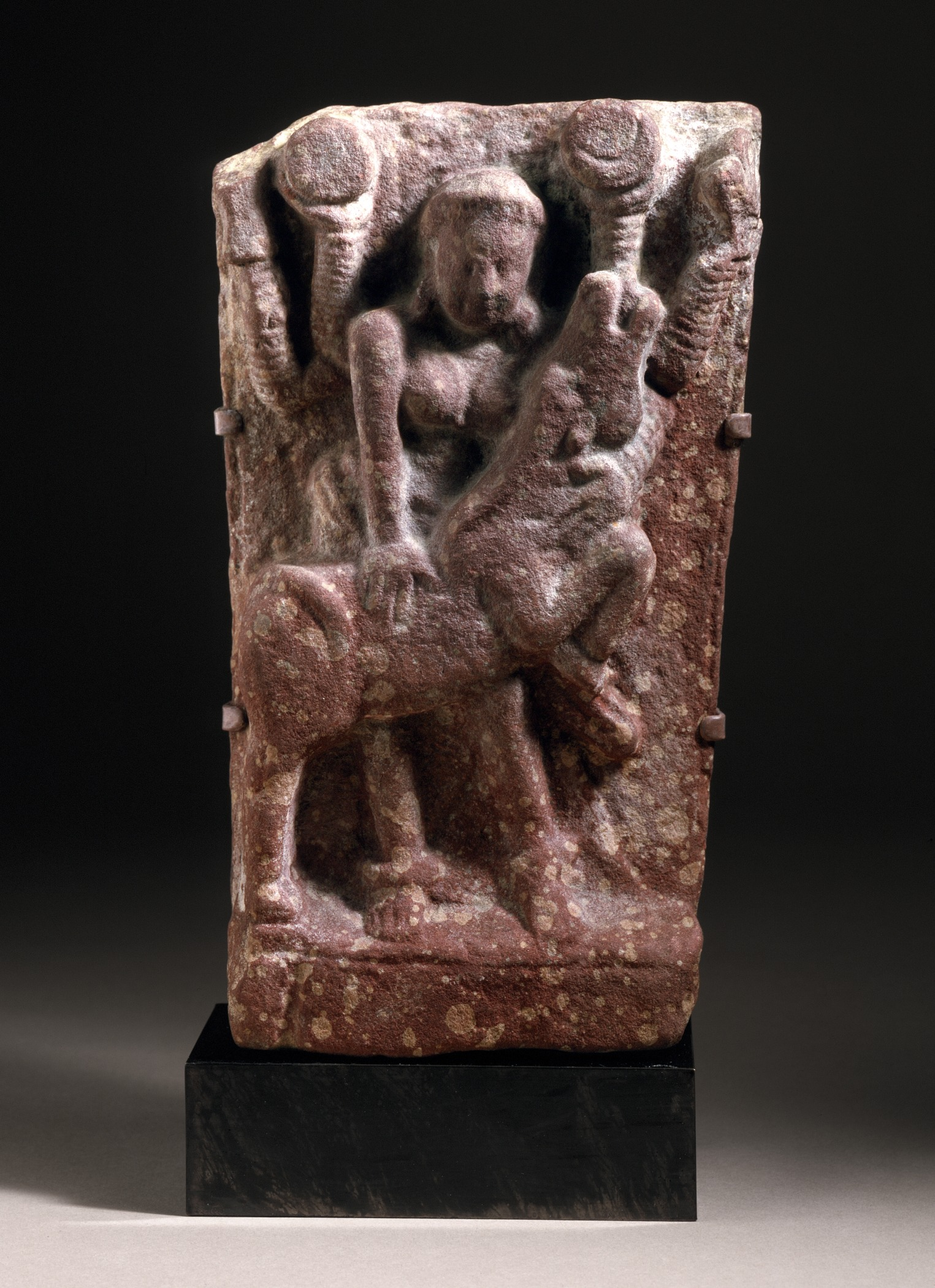
2nd-century Uttar Pradesh

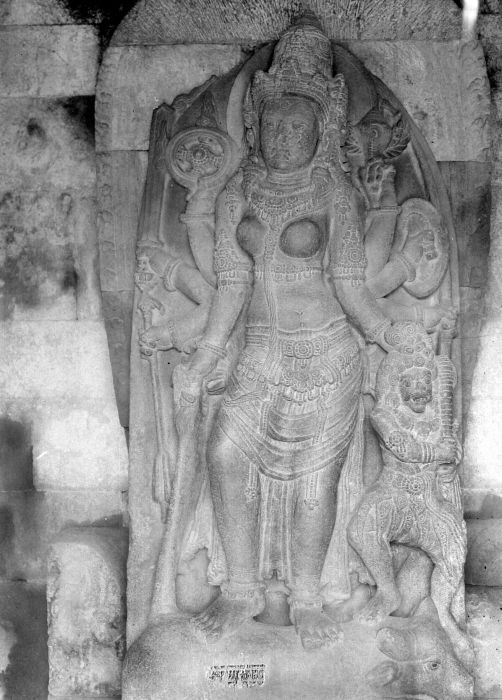
9th century Prambanan Indonesia

Mahishasura is a Sanskrit word composed of mahisha meaning "buffalo" and asura, referring to a class of power-seeking beings in Hindu cosmology. While often loosely translated as "buffalo demon", asuras are fundamentally rivals to the devas rather than embodiments of pure evil. As an asura, Mahishasura waged war against the devas, as the devas and asuras were perpetually in conflict. Mahishasura had gained the boon that no man could kill him. In the battles between the devas and the demons (asuras), the devas, led by Indra, were defeated by Mahishasura. Subjected to defeat, the devas assembled in the mountains where their combined divine energies coalesced into the goddess Durga. The newborn Durga led a battle against Mahishasura, riding a lion, and killed him. Thereafter, she was named Mahishasuramardini, meaning The Killer of Mahishasura. According to the Lakshmi Tantra and Narada Purana, it is the goddess Lakshmi who slays Mahishasura instantaneously, and extolling her feat is described to offer everlasting supremacy. Meanwhile, the Garuda Purana (2.2.67-68) also mentions that the consort of Venkateswara, had killed Mahishasura.

Mahishasura's legend is told in the major texts of the Shaktism traditions known as the Devi Mahatmya, which is part of Markandeya Purana. The story of Mahishasura is told in the chapter where Markandeya is narrating the story of the birth of Savarnika Manu. Per the Markandeya Purana, the story of Mahishasura was narrated in the second Manvantara (approximately 1.3 billion years ago, as per the Vishnu Purana) by Maharishi Medha to a king named Suratha. Mahishasura is described as an evil being who can change his outer form, but never his demonic goals. According to Christopher Fuller, Mahishasura represents the forces of ignorance and chaos hidden by outer appearances. The symbolism is carried in Hindu art found in South Asia and South-East Asia (e.g., Javanese art), where Durga is shown as a serene, calm, collected and graceful symbol of good as she pierces the heart and kills the scared, overwhelmed and outwitted Mahishasura.

== Variations ==
Scholars generally treat the Devi Mahatmya as the standard telling of Durga’s slaying of Mahishasura, while noting that later texts and regions preserve additional versions. Across the Puranas, retellings vary in narrative detail and emphasis, reflecting the fluidity of the corpus and how episodes are adapted in different redactions and local traditions. Texts also differ in the name and form of the goddess who defeats Mahishasura. Some sources foreground Mahalakshmi, others Katyayani or Bhadrakali; the identification depends on the text and sectarian context. Indological surveys note that Purana compilers sometimes re-situate myths within different cosmic cycles. As a result, the setting and supporting details of the battle can shift from one source to another. Modern scholarship commonly reads the episode as a theological statement about the manifestation of the goddess’s shakti, rather than as a single fixed event across all texts; emphasis falls on divine power, cosmic order, and protection of the gods and world.

== Art ==
Durga slaying Mahishasura is a prominent theme which was sculpted in various caves and temples across India. Some of the prominent representations are seen at the Mahishasuramardini caves in Mahabalipuram, the Ellora Caves, in the entrance of Rani ki vav, Hoysaleswara Temple in Halebidu and many more temples across India. The worship of Durga during Durga Puja in Bihar, West Bengal, Jharkhand, Odisha and other eastern states is represented in Pandal which depict Durga killing Mahishasura. The legend of Mahishasura has also been inspiration for films, plays and dance dramas.

== Etymology of Mysore ==
The popular legend is that Mysore (Mahishooru) gets its name from Mahishasuramardini, a manifestation of goddess Durga. The buffalo demon Mahishasura, states the regional tradition, had terrified the local population. It is believed that goddess Durga (Chamundeshwari) killed Mahishasura on top of the Chamundi Hills. The spot was constructed as the Chamundeshwari Temple in Mysuru city, an event that is annually celebrated at Navaratri and Mysuru Dasara. The British Era in India saw the name change to "Mysore" and later Kannadized back into "Mysuru".

The temple of the city's guardian deity, Chamundeshvari, has a giant statue of Mahishasura on the hill facing the city. The earliest mention of Mysore in recorded history may be traced to 245 B.C., i.e., to the period of Ashoka when on the conclusion of the third Buddhist convocation, a team was dispatched to Mahisha Mandala.

== Asur tribe's narrative ==
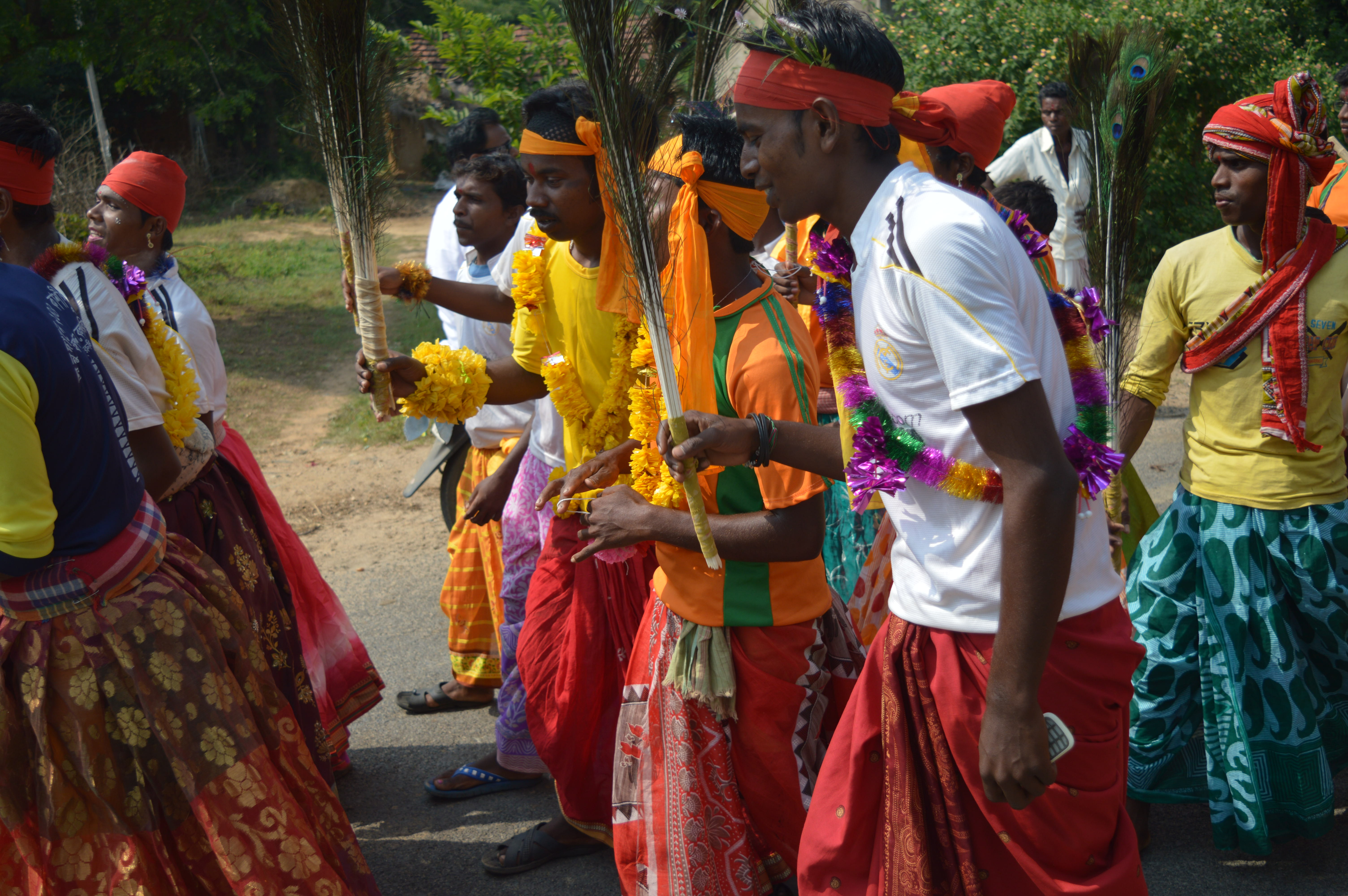
Dasai dance at the streets of Purulia district.

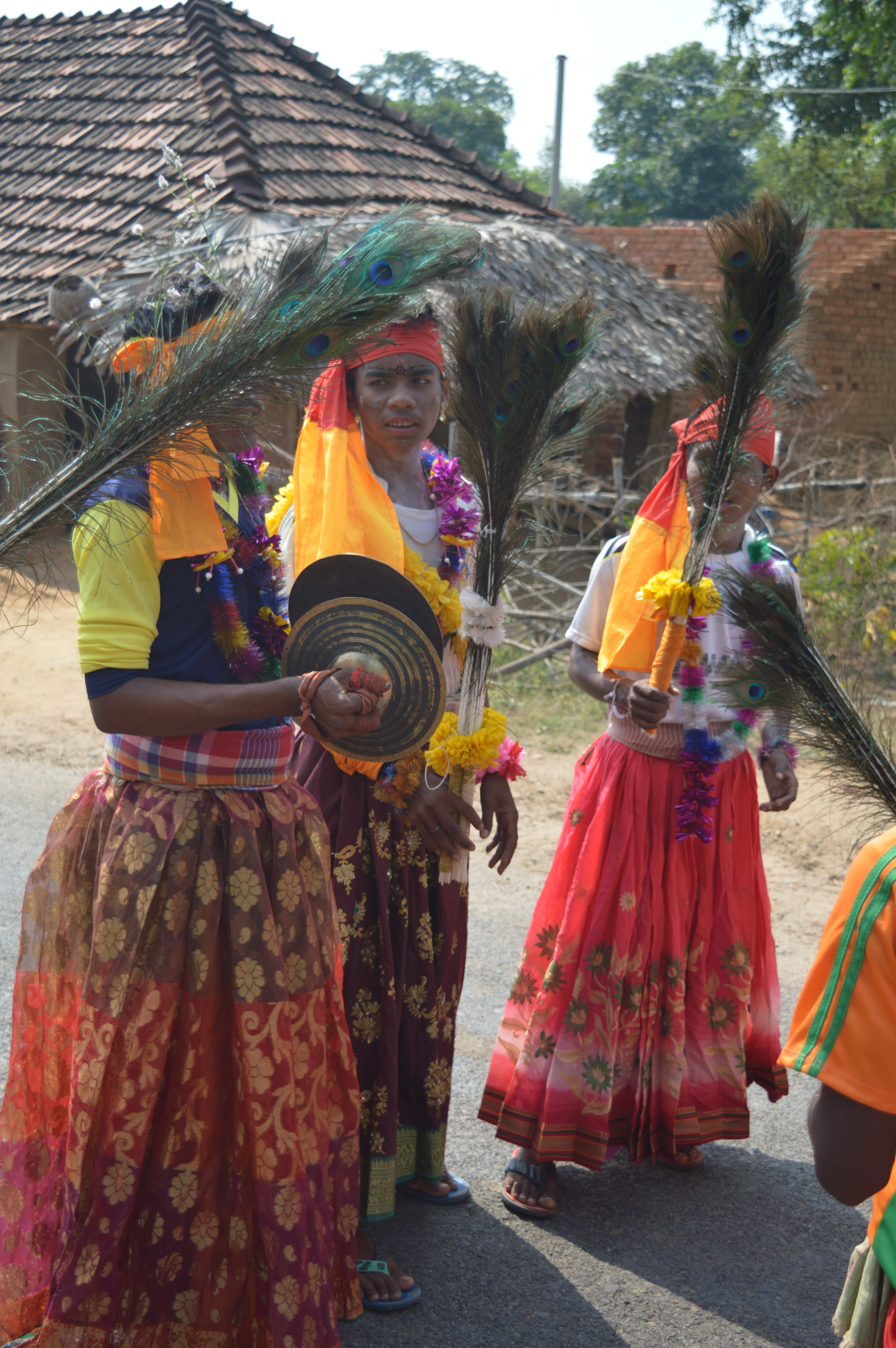
Males wear female clothing in accordance with the tradition of the Dasai dance.

Asurs believe that the Mahishasura was their benevolent ancestor, and mourn during the Durga Puja period for what they see as the unjust butchering of their ancestor. The veneration of Mahishasura was spread throughout the Munda tribes of West Bengal as well as Namasudras by Christian missionaries or evangelical groups in India who frame their religious agenda around Aryan-Dravidian re-interpretation.

The Kherwal Santal people and the Kolarian Dravidian Asura tribe community worship Mahishasura, whom they call Hudur Durga, as their deity. In contrast, they consider Durga to be the villain. The word hudur means lightning and the word Durga means protector. The combined meaning of the word is lightning-hard guard.

According to the Kherwal Santal and Asura tribes of Jharkhand, India, Hudur Durga was their millennial ancestor, the king of a village called Chaichampa. After the Aryans came to India, they realizing that they were unable to defeat Hudur Durga, so they began to think of various ways to kill him. They found out that he was very feminine and that women were highly regarded in their society, so they sent a beautiful woman of fair complexion as a spy to assassinate him.

The Aryans proposed marriage to the king. Impressed by the woman's appearance, the king agreed to marry her and was killed by her seven days after they got married. Upon hearing the news of the king's death, the Aryans invaded the kingdom in order to seize it. On the advice of their guru, the men of the kingdom bathed in the river Saraswati, disguised as women, and fled the kingdom to perform the Dasai dance.

The Santals claim that the Aryans reidentified the woman as Durga and the king as Mahishasura in their scriptures, and that the name of their king, Hudur Durga, was incorrectly mentioned to be the name of the woman. During Durga Puja, they do not worship Durga but worship Mahishasura and mourn the women by dancing Dasai on the way.

== Gallery ==
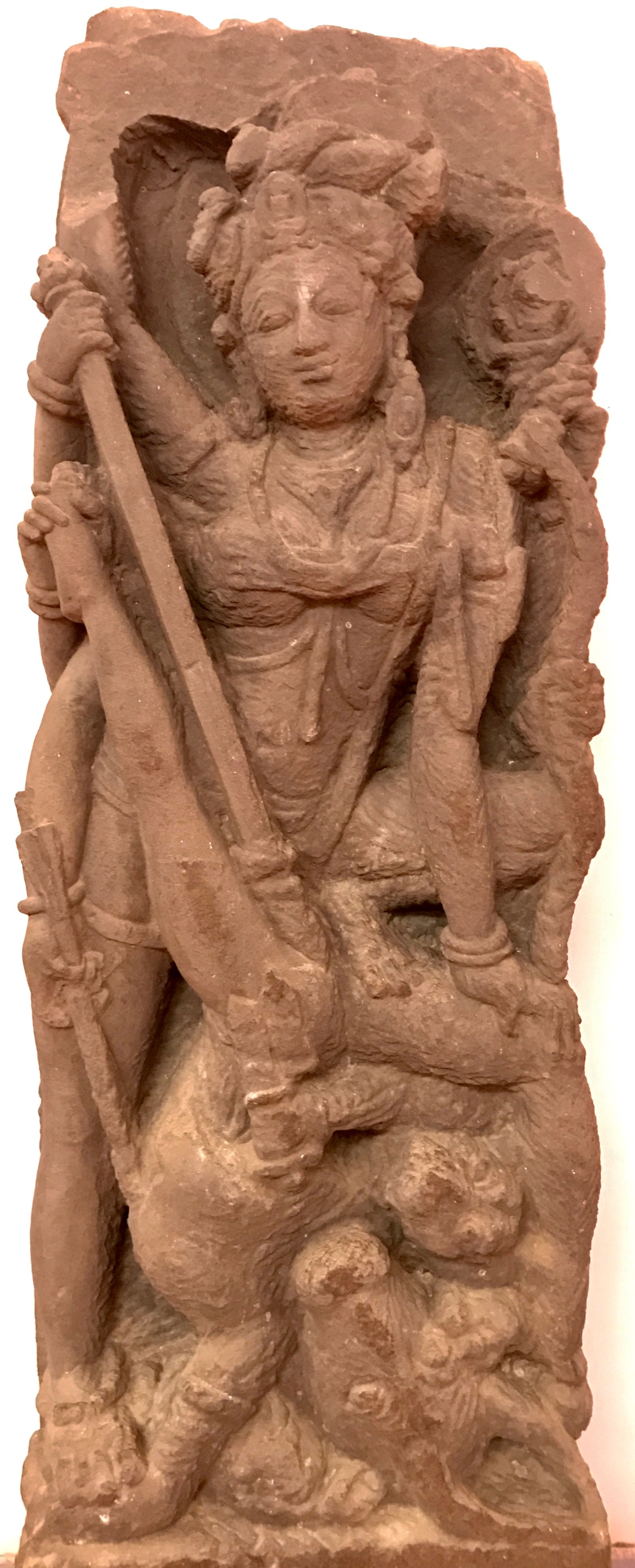
Durga killing Mahishasura, 9th century Sirpur temple, Chhattisgarh.

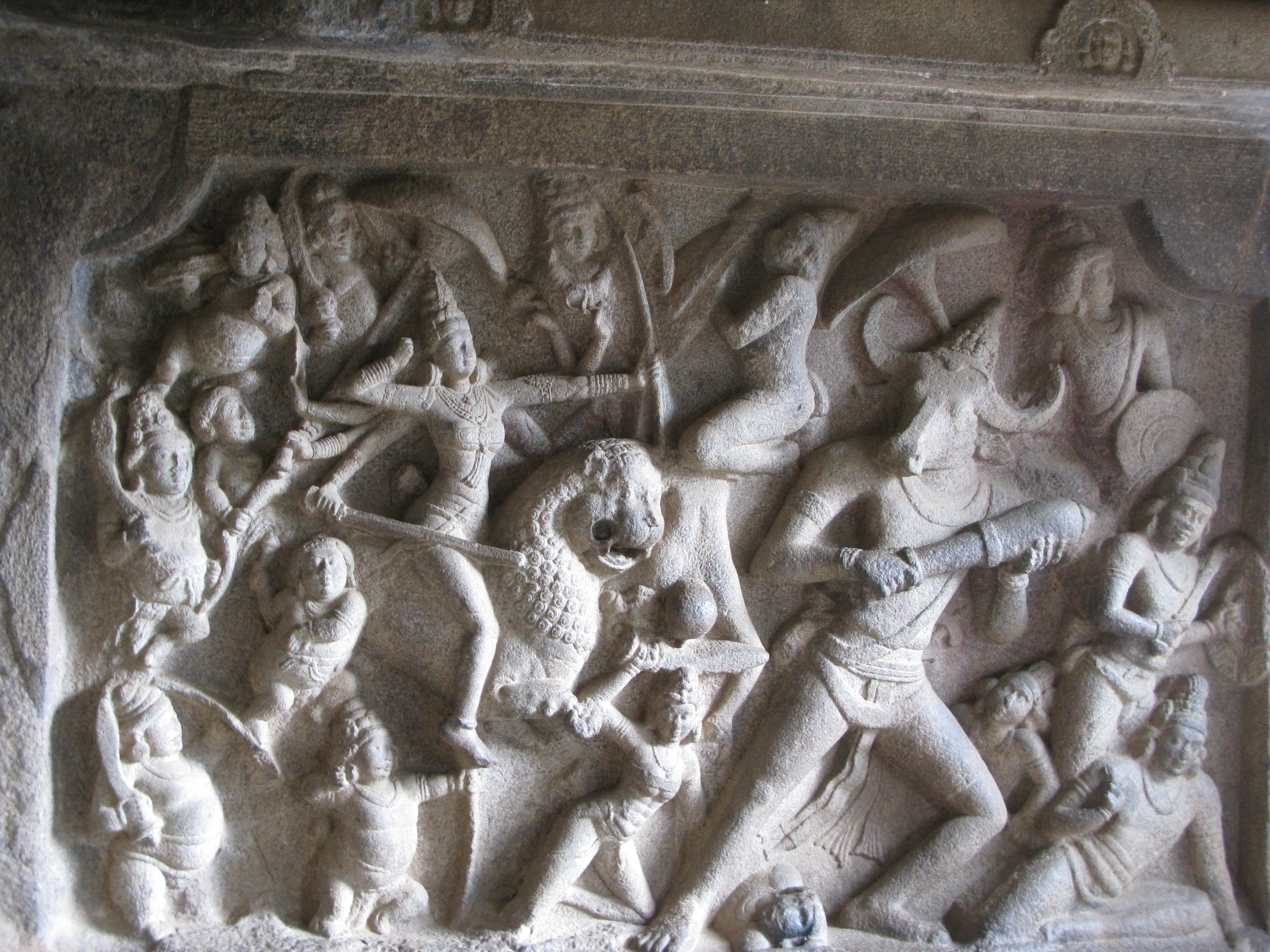
Buffalo-headed Mahishasura in Cave Temple, Mahabalipuram

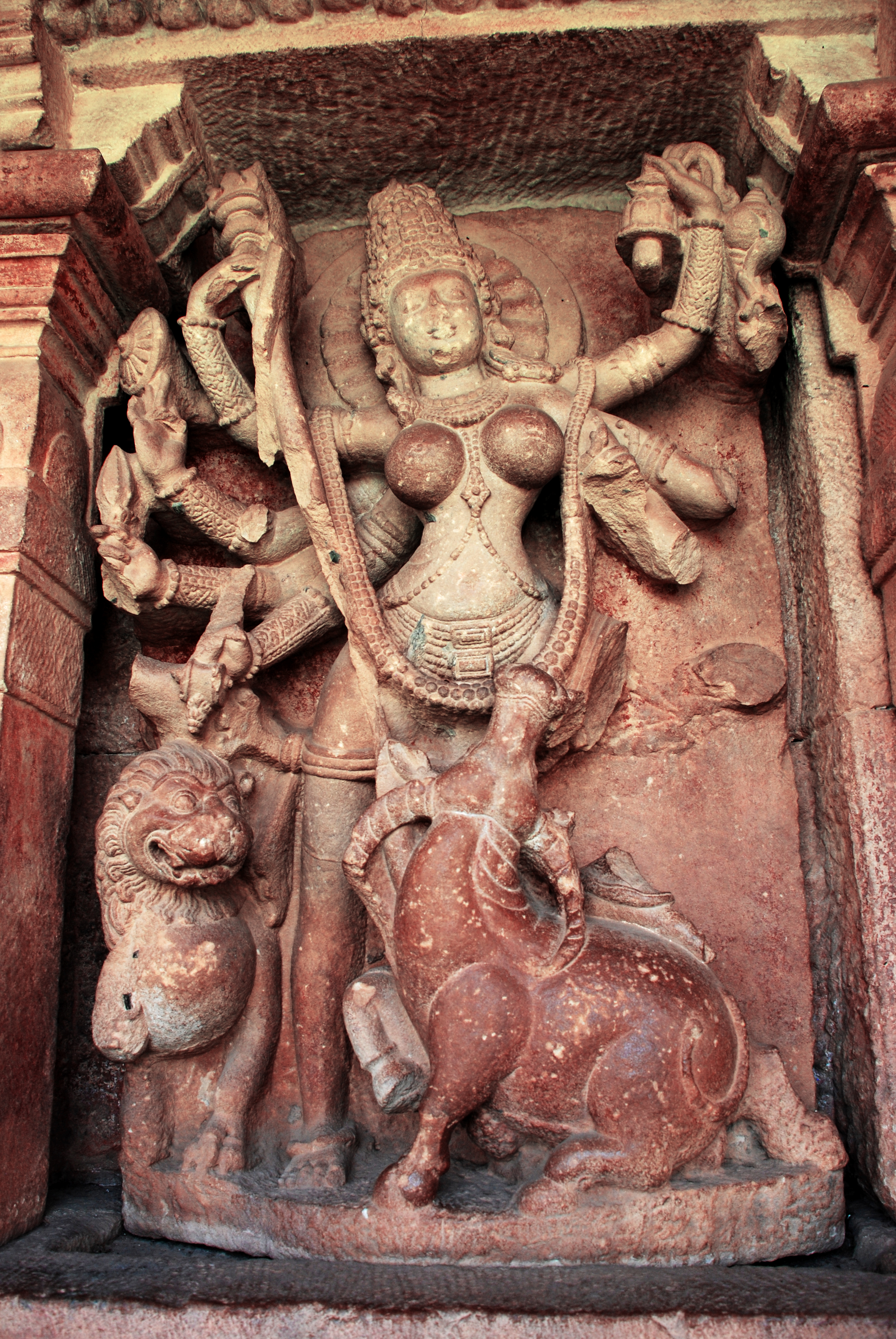
Mahishasura at Durga's foot in the Aihole Temple

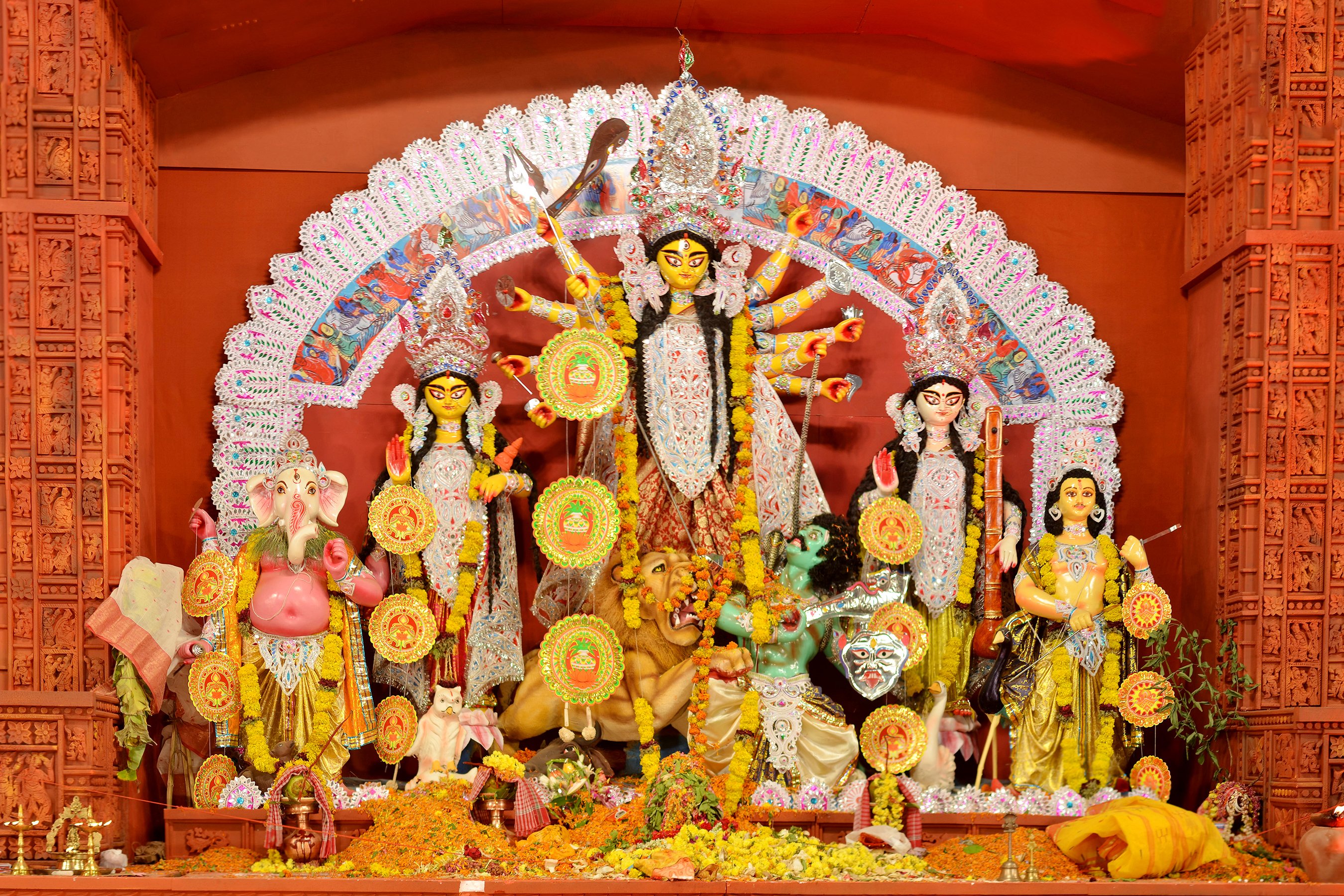
Durga is worshiped in her Mahishasuramardini form, during Durga Puja. Lakshmi and Ganesha flank the left while Saraswati and Kartikeya flank the right.

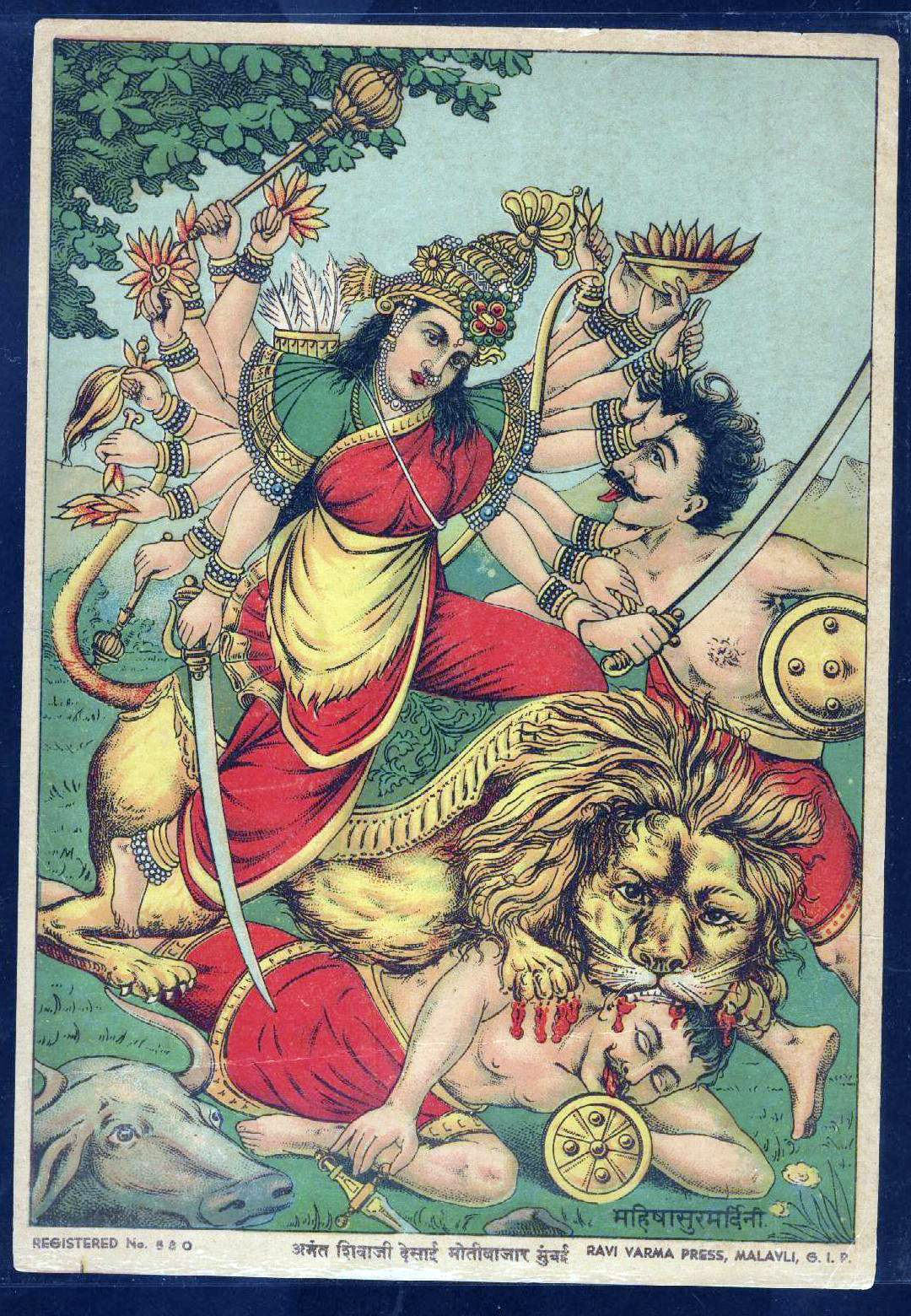
Durga "Mahishasura-mardini," the slayer of the buffalo demon; Ravi Varma Press, c.1910's

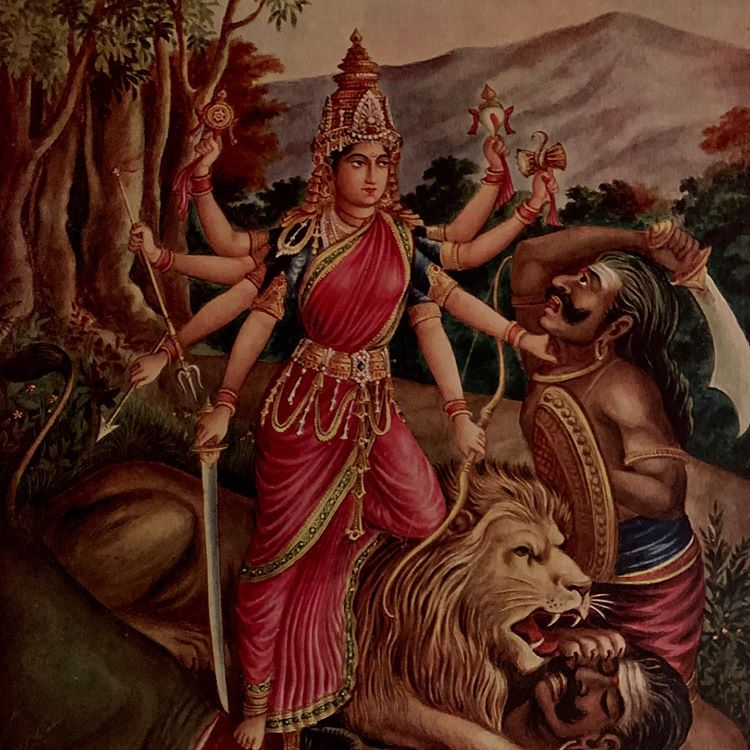
Durga is depicted in the Hindu pantheon as a Goddess riding a lion and with many arms, each carrying a weapon to defeat Mahishasura or the buffalo demon

== See also ==
- Raktabīja
- Sumbha and Nisumbha
- Rambha (asura)
- Chanda and Munda
