= Devi =

Goddess in Hinduism

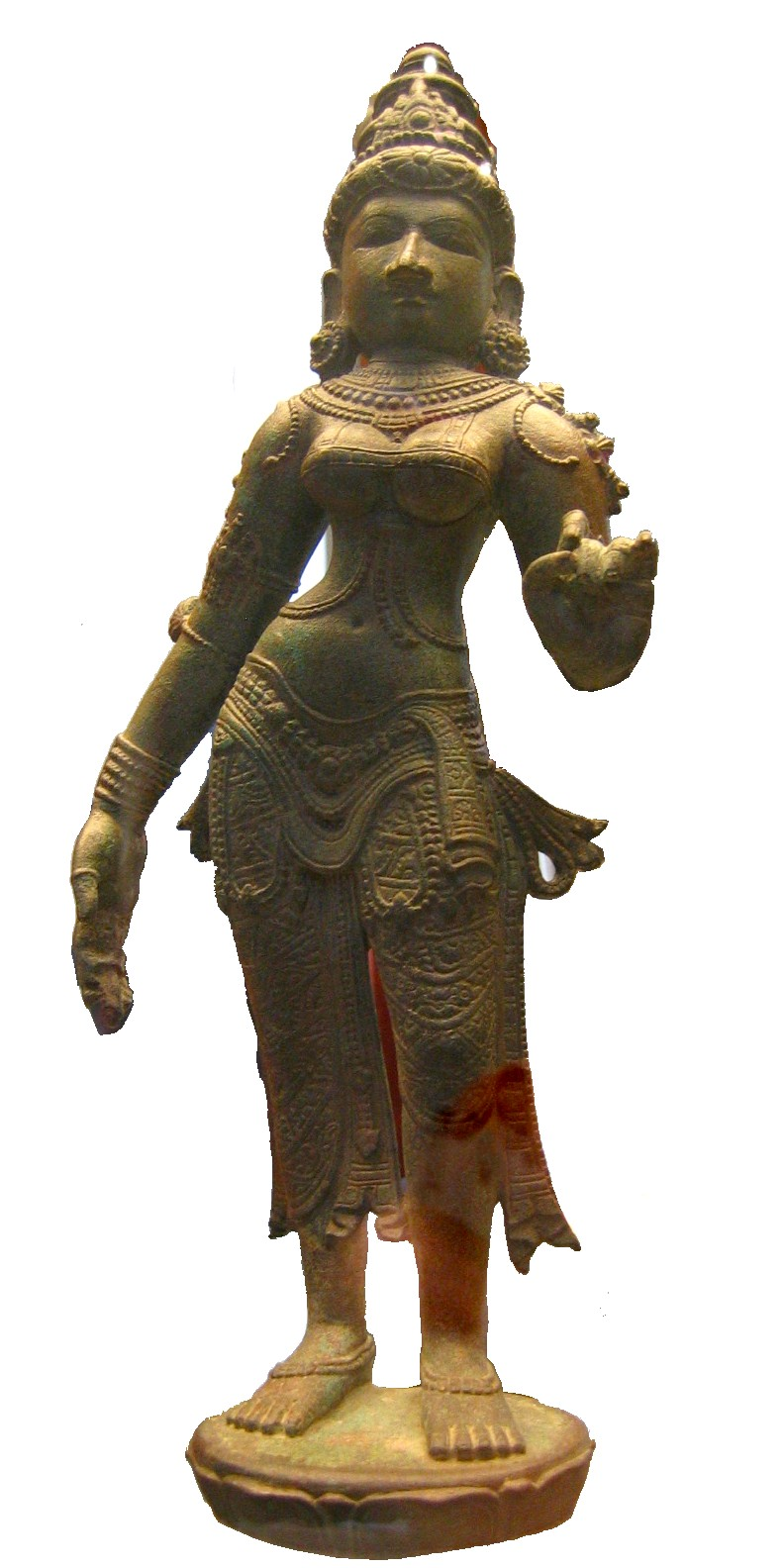
A sculpture of the goddess Lakshmi

Devī (/ˈdeɪvi/; Sanskrit: देवी) is the Sanskrit word for 'goddess'; the masculine form is Deva. Devi and Deva mean 'heavenly, divine, anything of excellence', and are gender-specific terms for deity in Indian religions.

Reverence for the divine feminine in Hinduism appears in the Vedas, composed around the 2nd millennium BCE. Though the goddesses did not play a vital role in that era, goddesses such as Durga, Kali, Lakshmi, Parvati, Radha, Saraswati, Sita and Rukmini have continued to be revered into the modern era. The medieval era Puranas witnessed a major expansion in mythology and literature associated with Devi, with texts such as the Devi Mahatmya, wherein the goddess is revered as the ultimate truth and supreme power. The goddess centric tradition within Hinduism, namely Shaktism, is centred around Devi. Further, Devi is considered a central figure in the Hindu tradition of Shaivism. In Indian religions, the concept of Shakti explores the idea of divine feminine, and women are regarded as manifestations of Devi, as seen in the Kumari worship.

== Etymology ==
Devi and deva are Sanskrit terms found in Vedic literature around the 3rd millennium BCE. Deva is masculine, and the related feminine equivalent is devi. Monier-Williams translates it as 'heavenly, divine, terrestrial things of high excellence, exalted, shining ones'. Etymologically, a cognate of devi is Latin dea. When capitalised, Devi maata refers to the mother goddess in Hinduism. Deva is short for devatā and devi for devika.

According to Douglas Harper, the etymological root dev- means "a shining one", from *div-, "to shine", it is an Indo-European cognate of the Greek dios, Gothic divine and Latin deus (Old Latin deivos); see also *Dyēus.

A synonym for the word Devi in the Vedas is Bhagavati. Bhagavatī (Devanagari: भगवती, IAST: Bhagavatī), is an Indian epithet of Sanskrit origin, used as an honorific title for goddesses in Hinduism and Buddhism. In Hinduism, it is primarily used to address the goddesses Lakshmi and Durga. In Buddhism, it is used to refer to several Mahayana Buddhist female deities, like Cundā.

== History ==
The worship of Devi-like deities dates back to period of Indus Valley civilisation.

The Devīsūkta of the Rigveda (10.125.1 to 10.125.8) is among the most studied hymns declaring that the ultimate reality is a goddess:

I have created all worlds at my will without being urged by any higher Being, and dwell within them. I permeate the earth and heaven, and all created entities with my greatness and dwell in them as eternal and infinite consciousness.

— Devi Sukta, Rigveda 10.125.8, Translated by June McDaniel

The Vedas name numerous cosmic goddesses such as Prithvi (earth), Aditi (cosmic moral order), Vāc (sound), Nirṛti (destruction), Ratri (night) and Aranyani (forest); bounty goddesses such as Dinsana, Raka, Puramdhi, Parendi, Bharati and Mahi are among others are mentioned in the Rigveda. However, the goddesses are not discussed as frequently as gods (devas). Devi appears in late Vedic texts dated to be pre-Buddhist, but verses dedicated to her do not suggest that her characteristics were fully developed in the Vedic era. All gods and goddesses are distinguished in Vedic times, but in post-Vedic texts, particularly in the early medieval era literature, they are ultimately seen as aspects or manifestations of one Devi, the Supreme Power.

Devi is the supreme being in the Shakta tradition of Hinduism; in the Smarta tradition, she is one of the five primary forms of Brahman that is revered. In other Hindu traditions, Devi embodies the active energy and power of Deva, and they always appear together complementing each other. Examples of this are Parvati with Shiva in Shaivism, Saraswati with Brahma in Brahmanism and Lakshmi with Vishnu, Sita with Rama and Radha with Krishna in Vaishnavism.

Devi-inspired philosophy is propounded in many Hindu texts such as the Devi Upanishad, which teaches that Shakti is essentially Brahman (ultimate metaphysical Reality) and that from her arises prakṛti (matter) and purusha (consciousness) and that she is bliss and non-bliss, the Vedas and what is different from it, the born and the unborn and all of the universe. Shakti is Parvati, Shiva's wife. She is also mentioned as the creative power of Shiva in Tripura Upanishad, Bahvricha Upanishad and Guhyakali Upanishad.

Devi identifies herself in the Devi Upanishad as Brahman in her reply to the gods stating that she rules the world, blesses devotees with riches, that she is the supreme deity to whom all worship is to be offered and that she infuses Ātman in every soul. Devi asserts that she is the creator of earth and heaven and resides there. Her creation of the sky as father and the seas as the mother is reflected as the 'Inner Supreme Self'. Her creations are not prompted by any higher being and she resides in all her creations. She is, states Devi, the eternal and infinite consciousness engulfing earth and heaven, and 'all forms of bliss and non-bliss, knowledge and ignorance, Brahman and Non-Brahman'. The tantric aspect in Devi Upanishad, says June McDaniel, is the usage of the terms yantra, bindu, bija, mantra, shakti and chakra.

Among the major world religions, the concept of Goddess in Hinduism as the divine feminine has had the strongest presence since ancient times.

== Hindu goddesses ==
=== Parvati ===
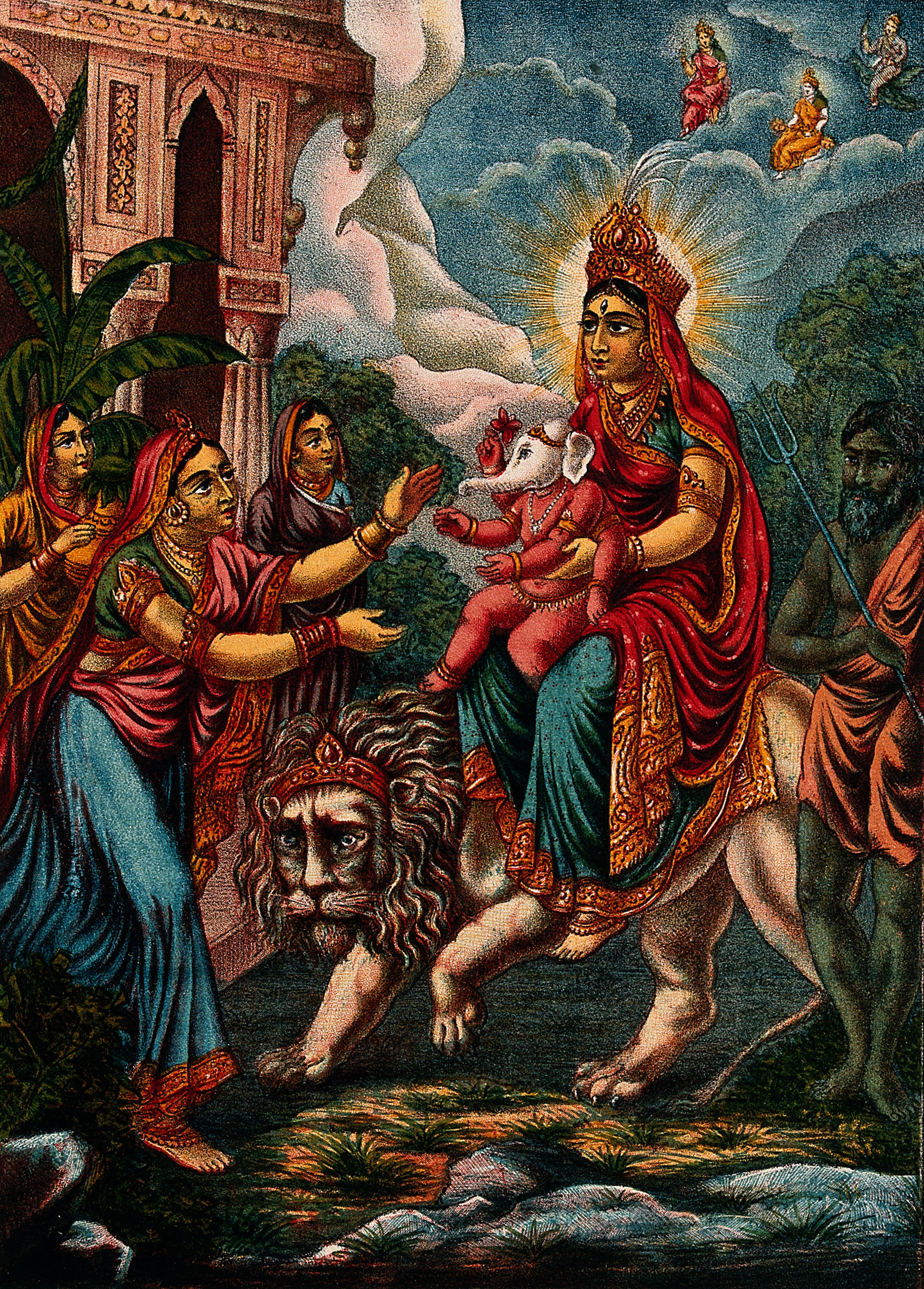
Parvati riding a lion with her son Ganesha

Parvati is the Hindu goddess of love, beauty, purity and devotion. She is the mother goddess in Hinduism and has many attributes and aspects. Each of her aspects is expressed with a different name, giving her over 1008 names in regional Hindu mythologies of India, including the popular names such as Gauri. Along with Lakshmi (goddess of wealth and prosperity) and Saraswati (goddess of knowledge and learning), she forms the trinity of Hindu goddesses.

Parvati is married to Shiva – the destroyer, recycler, and regenerator of the universe and all life. She is the mother of Hindu gods Ganesha and Kartikeya. Her parents are Himavan and Maināvati. According to Puranas she performed strict tapasya and achieved the position of consort of Shiva.

Rita Gross states, the view of Parvati only as an ideal wife and mother is an incomplete symbolism of the power of the feminine in the mythology of India. Parvati, along with other goddesses, are involved with a broad range of culturally valued goals and activities. Her connection with motherhood and female sexuality does not confine the feminine or exhaust their significance and activities in Hindu literature. She manifests in every activity, from water to mountains, from arts to inspiring warriors, from agriculture to dance. Parvati's numerous aspects, states Gross, reflect the Hindu belief that the feminine has a universal range of activities, and her gender is not a limiting condition.

In Hindu belief, Parvati is the recreative energy and power of Shiva, and she is the cause of a bond that connects all beings and a means of their spiritual release.

Devi is portrayed as the ideal wife, mother, and householder in Indian legends. In Indian art, this vision of ideal couple is derived from Shiva and Parvati as being half of the other, represented as Ardhanarishvara. Parvati is found extensively in ancient Indian literature, and her statues and iconography grace ancient and medieval era Hindu temples all over South Asia and Southeast Asia.

=== Lakshmi ===
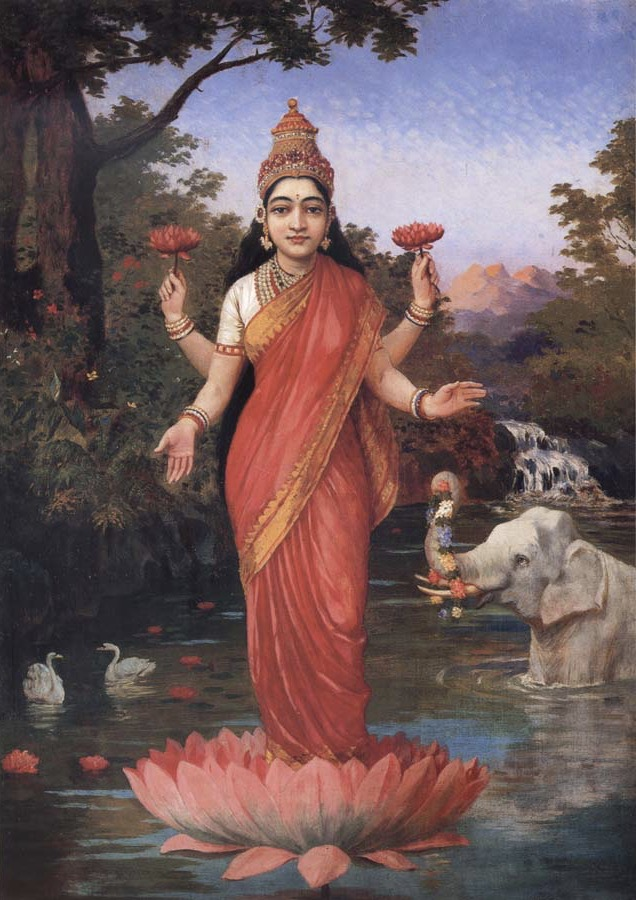
Lakshmi

Lakshmi, also called Sri, is the Hindu goddess of wealth, fortune, power, energy, prosperity (both material and spiritual). She is the consort and active energy of Vishnu. Her four hands represent the four goals of human life considered important to the Hindu way of life – dharma, kama, artha, and moksha. She is the mother goddess in Hinduism. She is also part of Tridevi which consists of Lakshmi, Parvati (goddess of fierceness, love, maternity), and Saraswati (goddess of music, wisdom, and learning).

In the ancient scriptures of India, all women are declared to be embodiments of Lakshmi. The marriage and relationship between Lakshmi and Vishnu as wife and husband, states Patricia Monaghan, is "the paradigm for rituals and ceremonies for the bride and groom in Hindu weddings."

Archaeological discoveries and ancient coins suggest the recognition and reverence for goddess Lakshmi in the Scytho-Parthian kingdom and throughout India by the 1st millennium BCE. She is also revered in other non-Hindu cultures of Asia, such as in Tibet. She is also worshipped in Buddhism. Lakshmi's iconography and statues have also been found in Hindu temples throughout Southeast Asia, estimated to be from second half of 1st millennium CE. In modern times, Lakshmi is worshipped as the goddess of wealth. The festivals of Diwali and Sharad Purnima (Kojagiri Purnima) are celebrated in her honor.

=== Saraswati ===
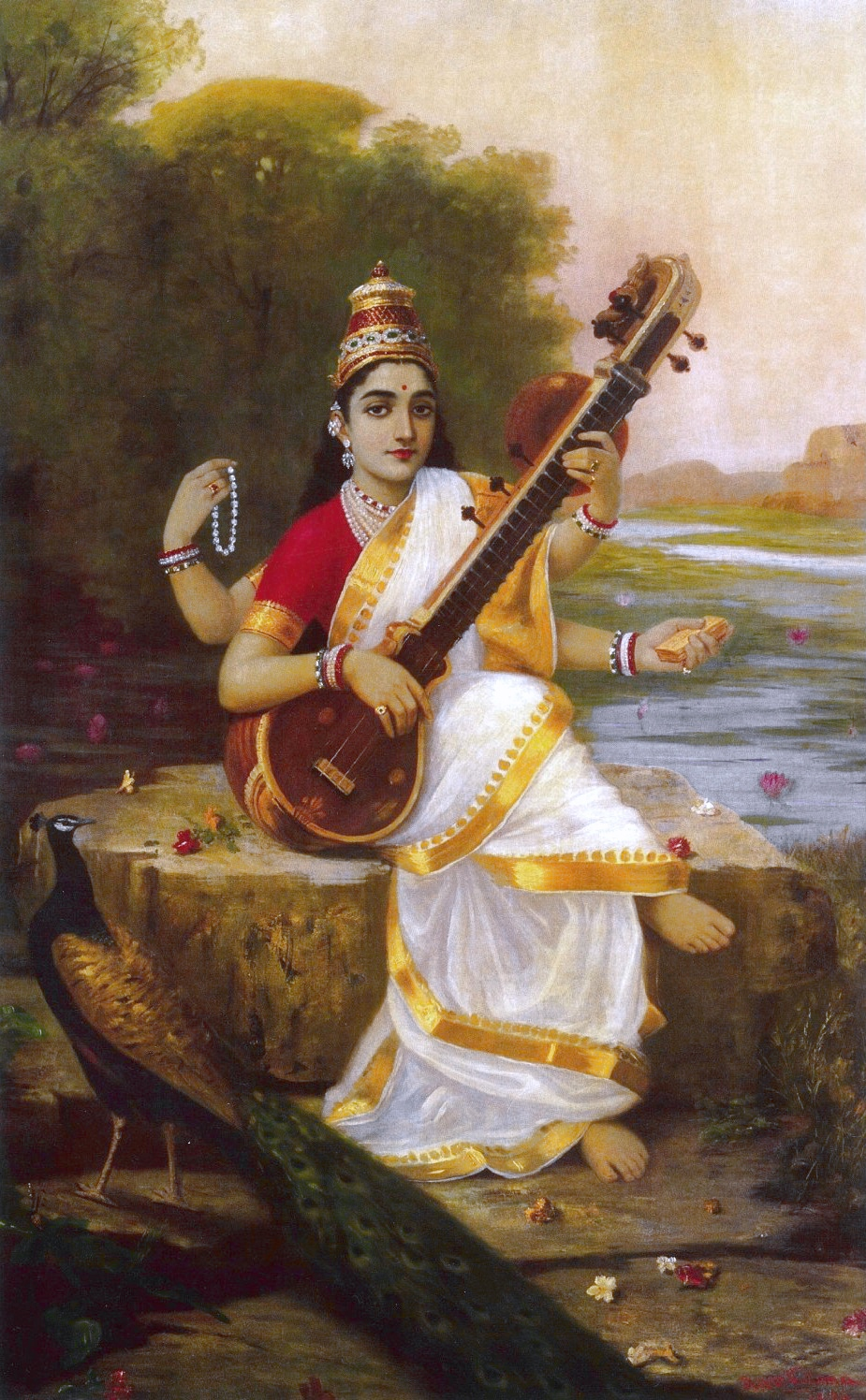
Image of goddess Saraswati

Saraswati is the Hindu goddess of knowledge, music, arts, wisdom, and learning.

The earliest known mention of Saraswati as a goddess is in Rigveda. She has remained significant as a goddess from the Vedic age through modern times of Hindu traditions. Some Hindus celebrate the festival of Vasant Panchami (the fifth day of spring) in her honor, and mark the day by helping young children learn how to write alphabets on that day. She is also part of Tridevi which consists of Saraswati, Parvati (goddess of power, fertility, love, beauty), and Lakshmi (goddess of material wealth, prosperity, and fortune).

Saraswati is often depicted dressed in pure white, often seated on a white lotus. She not only embodies knowledge but also the experience of the highest reality. Her iconography is typically in white themes from dress to flowers to swan – the color symbolizing Sattwa Guna or purity, discrimination for true knowledge, insight and wisdom.

She is generally shown to have 8 to 10 arms, but sometimes just shows two. The four hands hold items with symbolic meaning – a pustaka (book or script), a mala (rosary, garland), a water pot, and a musical instrument (lute or vina). The book she holds symbolizes the Vedas representing the universal, divine, eternal, and true knowledge as well as all forms of learning. A mālā of crystals, representing the power of meditation, and a pot of water represents the power to purify right from wrong. The musical instrument, typically a veena, represents all creative arts and sciences, and her holding it symbolizes expressing knowledge that creates harmony. The Saraswatirahasya Upanishad of the Yajurveda contain ten verses called "dasa sloki" which are in praise of Sarasvati. In this Upanishad, she is extolled as

You are the swan gliding over the pond of creative energy, waves and waves of creative forces emanating from your form! Radiant Goddess resplendent in white, dwells forever in the Kashmir of my heart.

Saraswati is also found outside India, such as in Japan, Vietnam, Bali (Indonesia) and Myanmar.

=== Durga and Kali ===
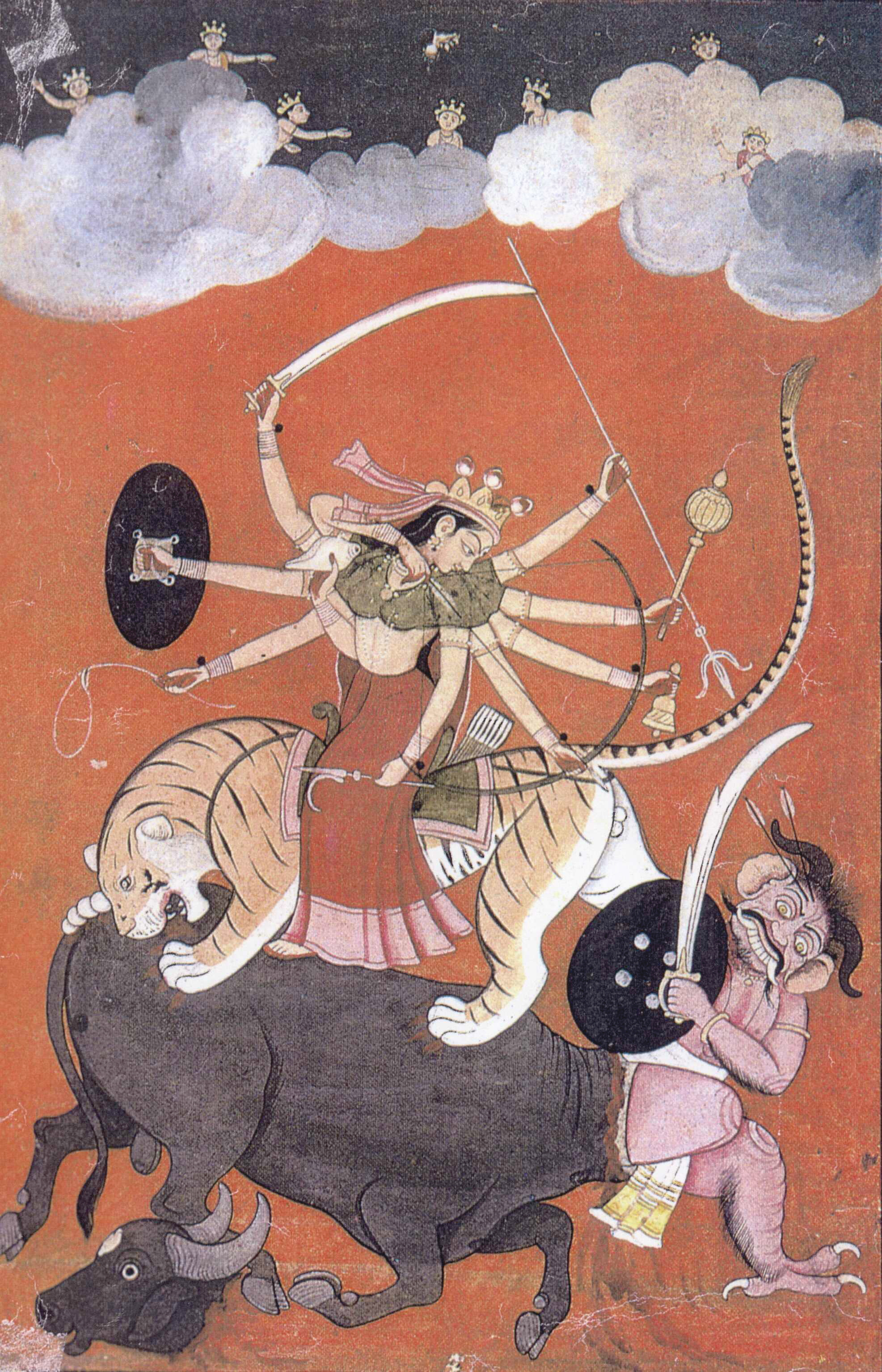
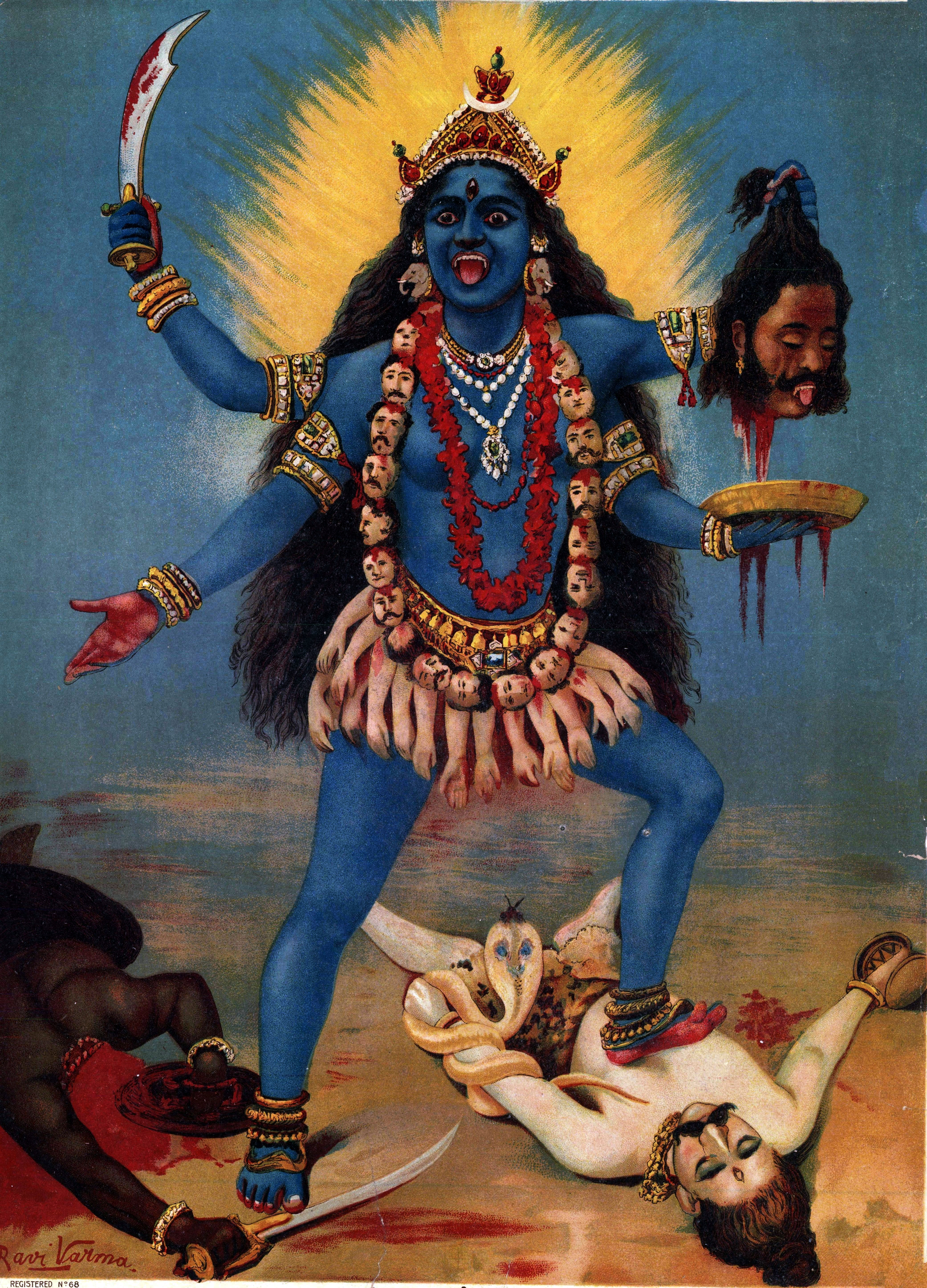
Durga (left) killing the demon Mahishasura. In her most ferocious form, Durga metamorphoses into Kali (right).

Vedic literature does not have any particular goddess matching the concept of Durga. Her legends appear in the medieval era, as an angry, ferocious form of the mother goddess Mahalakshmi, who assumes the avatar of Durga . She manifests as a goddess with eight or ten arms, holding weapons and skulls of demons, and is astride on a tiger or lion. In the Skanda Purana, the Devi Bhagvata Purana and other Puranas, Devi assumes the form of a warrior-goddess and defeats an asura called Durgamasura, who assumes the form of a buffalo. In this aspect, she is known by the name Durga. In later Hindu literature, states Jansen, she is attributed the role of the "energy, power (shakti) of the Impersonal Absolute".

In the Shaktism traditions of Hinduism, found particularly in eastern states of India, Durga is a popular goddess form of Adishakti. In the medieval era composed texts such as the Puranas, she emerges as a prominent goddess in the context of crisis, when evil asuras were on the ascent. The male gods were unable to contain and subdue the forces of evil. The warrior goddess, Devi, kills the asura, and is thereafter invincible, and revered as "preserver of Dharma, destroyer of evil".

Durga's emergence and mythology is described in the Puranas, particularly the Devi Mahatmya. The text describes Kālī's emerging out of Parvati when she becomes extremely angry. Parvati's face turns pitch dark, and suddenly Kali springs forth from Parvati's forehead. She is black, wears a garland of human heads, is clothed in a tiger skin, rides a tiger, and wields a staff topped by a human skull. She destroys the asuras. Literature on goddess Kali recounts several such appearances, mostly in her terrifying but protective aspects. Kali appears as an independent deity, or like Parvati, viewed as the wife of Shiva. In this aspect, she represents the omnipotent Shakti of Shiva. She holds both the creative and destructive power of time. Kali, also called Kalaratri, is called in Yoga Vasistha as Prakṛti or "all of nature". She is described in the text, state Shimkhanda and Herman, as the "one great body of cosmos", and same as Devis "Durga, Jaya and Siddha, Lakshmi, Gayatri, Saraswati, Parvati, Savitri". She is the power that supports the earth, with all its seas, islands, forests, deserts and mountains, asserts Yoga Vasistha. She is not to be confused with the Kali Yuga, which is spelled similarly yet holds a different meaning. The Kali Yuga is presented as a threat to Mother India, with pictures from the nineteenth century depicting the age as a "ferocious meat-eating demon" in comparison to India's depiction of "a cow giving milk to her children".

The largest annual festival associated with the goddess is Durga Puja celebrated in the month of Ashvin (September–October), where nine manifestations of Parvati (Navadurga) are worshipped, each on a day over nine days. These are: Shailaputri, Brahmacharini, Chandraghanta, Kushmanda, Skandamata, Katyayani, Kaalratri, Mahagauri and Siddhidaatri.

=== Tridevi ===
In the goddess-worshiping Shaktidharma denomination of Hinduism, the supreme deity Mahadevi manifests as the goddess Mahasaraswati in order to create, as the goddess Mahalaxmi in order to preserve, and as the goddess Mahakali (Parvati) in order to destroy. These three forms of the supreme goddess Mahadevi are collectively called the Tridevi. These Tridevi are said to be the Shakti of all the Gods or Deva. Like Mahasaraswati is the Shakti of Brahma; Lakshmi is the Shakti of Vishnu; and Mahakali is Shakti of Shiva.

=== Sita ===
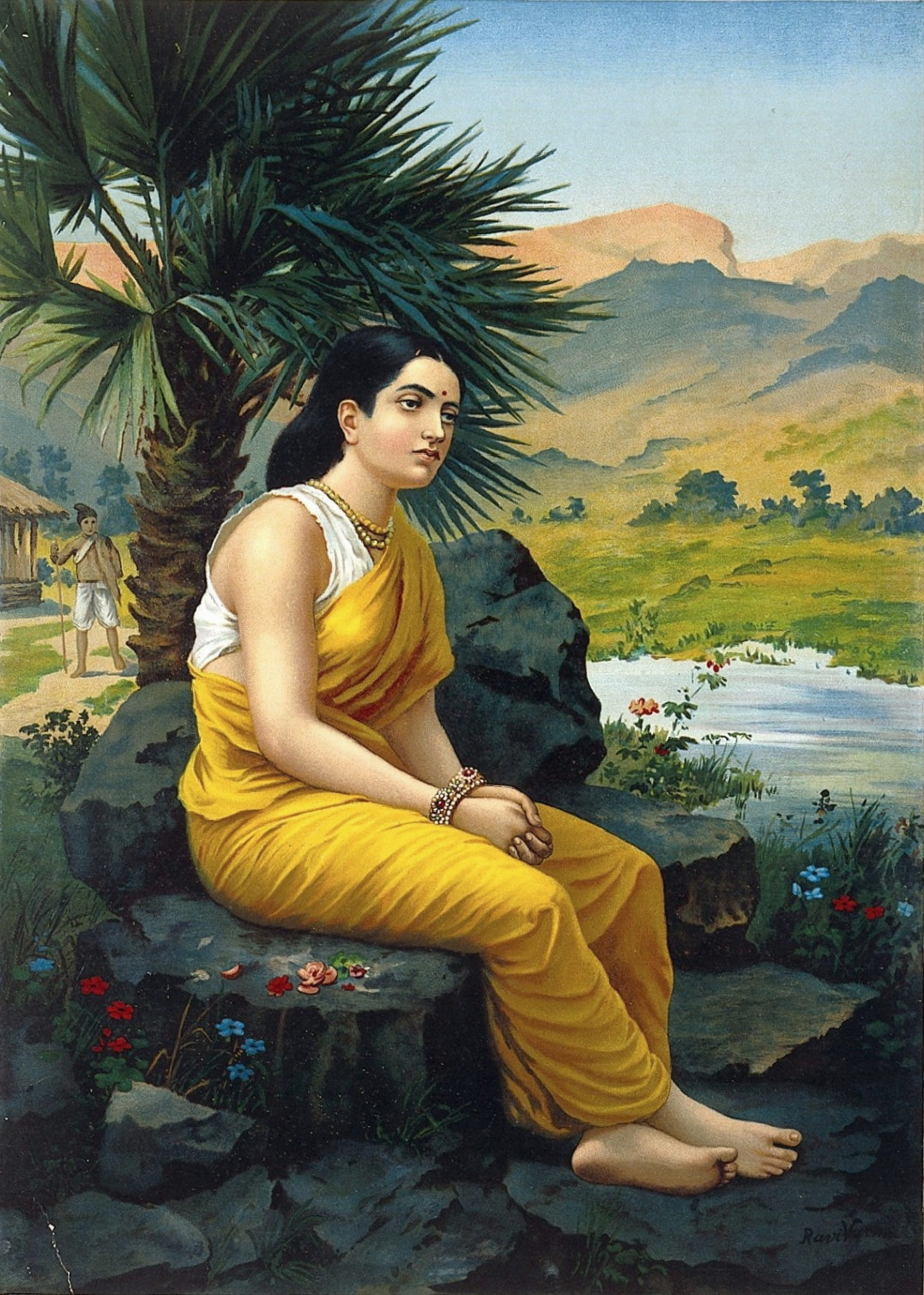
Sita

Sita, an incarnation of Lakshmi, is married to Rama, an avatar of Vishnu. She is shakti or prakriti of Rama as told in the Ram Raksha Stotram. In Sita Upanishad, a shakta Upanishad, Sita is extolled as the supreme goddess. The Upanishad identifies Sita with Prakrti (nature) which is constituted by "will" ichha, activity (kriya) and knowledge (jnana). The Upanishad also states that Sita emerged while furrowing, at the edge of the plough. She is extolled as one of the Panchakanya for her virtuous qualities; taking their names destroys all sins.

Her life story and journeys with her husband Rama and brother-in-law Lakshmana are part of the Hindu epic Ramayana, an allegorical story with Hindu spiritual and ethical teachings. However, there are many versions of Ramayana, and her story as a goddess in Hindu mythology. Her legends also vary in southeast Asian versions of the epic Ramayana, such as in the Ramakien of Thailand where she is spelled as Sida (or Nang Sida).

In Valmiki Ramayana, Sita is repeatedly expressed as the manifestation of Lakshmi, as the one who blesses abundance in agriculture, food, and wealth. She is referred to golden goddess, wherein after Rama (Vishnu) is bereaved of her, he refuses to marry again, insists that he is married solely and forever to her, and uses a golden image of Sita as a substitute in the performance of his duties as a king. Sita, in many Hindu mythology, is the Devi associated with agriculture, fertility, food and wealth for the continuation of humanity.

=== Radha ===
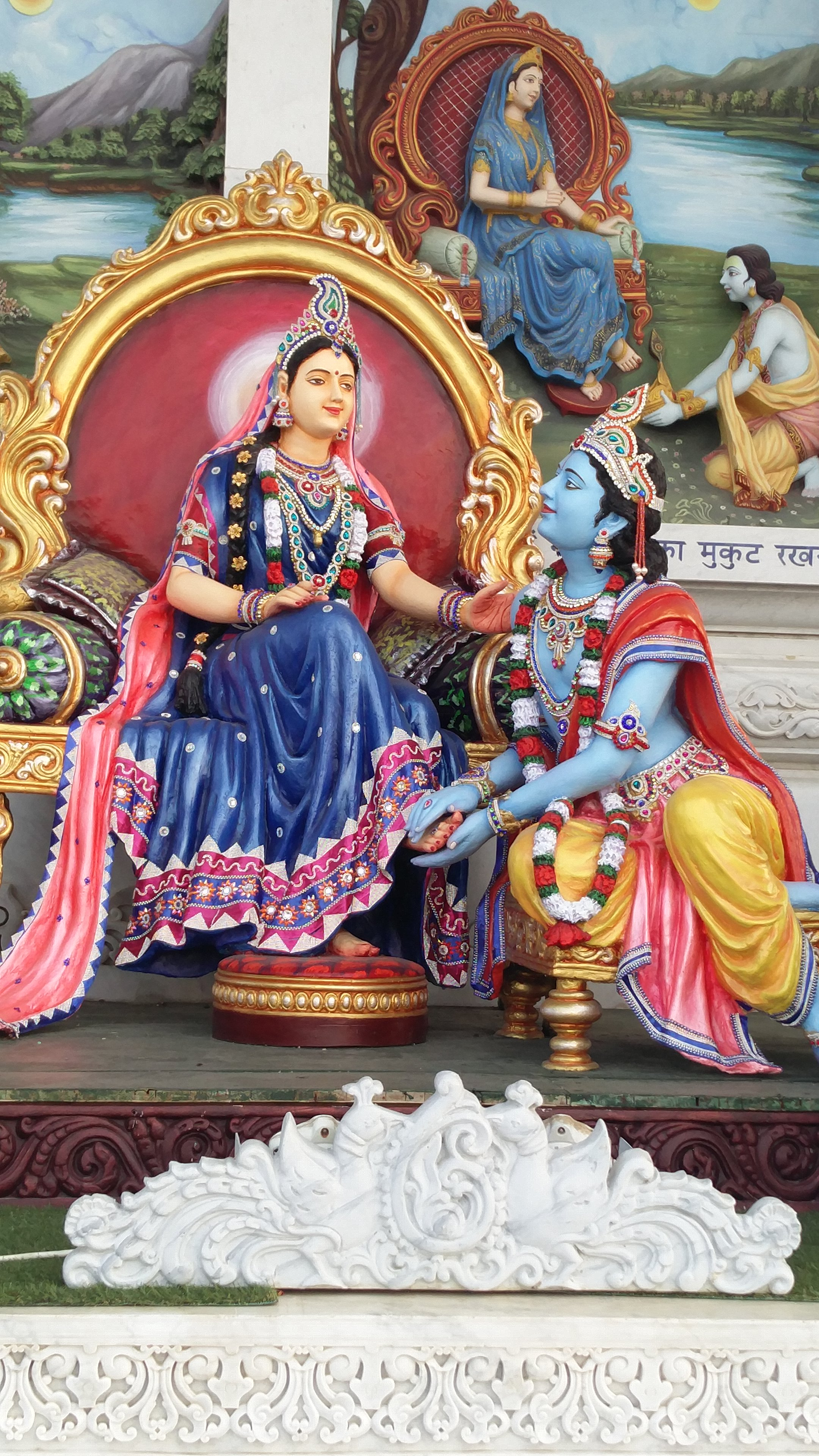
Krishna serving goddess Radha

Radha means "prosperity, success, and lightning." She is the female counterpart and consort of Krishna. She is also considered as the internal potency of Krishna. In Puranic literature such as the Brahma Vaivarta Purana, she is known as the Goddess of love and is also described as the "Prakriti" along with goddess Lakshmi, Parvati, Saraswati and Gayatri. She has figured prominently in the poems of Vidyapati (1352–1448) as a cosmic queen and later became inspiration behind many forms of art, literature, music and dance. She is also seen as the incarnation of Lakshmi. Some traditions worship Radha as the lover consort of Krishna while many other traditions worship Radha as the married consort of Lord Krishna.

Radha was made famous through Jayadeva's Gitagovinda poem which was written in 12th century. It is a lyrical drama, a "mystical erotic poem" which describes the love of Krishna and Radha. Some other texts which mentioned Radha are – Brahma Vaivarta Purana, Padma Purana, Skanda Purana, Devi Bhagvata Purana, Matsya Purana, Narada Pancharatra, Brahma Samhita, Shiva Purana and Garga Samhita.

Radha was born in Barsana and every year, her birthday is celebrated as "Radhashtami". She is described by scriptures as the chief of gopis. She is also revered as the queen of Barsana, Vrindavan and her spiritual abode Goloka. Her love affair with Krishna was set in Vraja and its surrounding forests. It is said that "Krishna enchants the world but Radha can even enchant Krishna due to her selfless love and complete dedication towards him".

Radha has always been a part of the bhakti movement symbolising "yearning of human soul drawn to Krishna". In South India, she is considered as Bhumidevi.

Though goddess Radha has more than thousand names but some of her common names used by devotees are – Radhika, Radhe, Radharani, Madhavi, Keshavi, Shyama, Kishori, Shreeji, Swamini ji (in Pushtimarg), Raseshwari, Vrindavaneshwari and Laadli ji.

=== Mahadevi ===
In the sixth century when Devi Mahatmya came into practice the name Devi (goddess) or Mahadevi (Great Goddess) came into prominence to represent one female goddess to encompass the discrete goddesses like Parvati and so forth. In the Hindu mythology, Devi and Deva are usually paired, complement and go together, typically shown as equal but sometimes the Devi is shown smaller or in the subordinate role. Some goddesses, however, play an independent role in Hindu pantheon, and are revered as Supreme without any male god(s) present or with males in subordinate position. Mahadevi, as mother goddess, is an example of the later, where she subsumes all goddesses, becomes the ultimate goddess, and is sometimes just called Devi.

Theological texts projected Mahadevi as ultimate reality in the universe as a "powerful, creative, active, transcendent female being." The Puranas and Tantra literature of India celebrates this idea, particularly between the 12th–16th century, and the best example of such texts being the various manuscript versions of Devi Bhagavata Purana with the embedded Devi Gita therein.

Devi Bhagavata Purana gives prime position to Mahadevi as the mother of all-encompassing the three worlds and gives her the position of being all of universe – the material and the spiritual. In the Upanishadic text Devi Upanishad, a Sakta Upanishad and an important Tantric text probably composed sometime between the ninth and fourteenth centuries the Goddess is addressed in the most general and universal of terms, as Mahadevi, and represents all goddesses as different manifestations of her. The Lalita Sahasranama (Thousand names of Lalita (Parvati) states that Mahadevi is known by different synonyms such as Jagatikanda (anchors the world), Vishvadhika (one who surpasses the universe), Nirupama (one who has no match), Parameshwari (dominant governor), Vyapini (encompasses everything), Aprameya (immeasurable), Anekakotibrahmadajanani (creator of many universes), Vishvagarbha (she whose Garba or womb subsumes the universe), Sarvadhara (helps all), Sarvaga (being everywhere at the same time, Sarvalokesi (governs all worlds) and Vishavdaharini one who functions for the whole universe).

The Mahadevi goddess has many aspects to her personality. She focuses on that side of her that suits her objectives, but unlike male Hindu deities, her powers and knowledge work in concert in a multifunctional manner. The ten aspects of her, also called Mahavidyas (or great forms of her knowledge) are forms of Parvati and they are: Kali, Tara, Tripura Sundari, Bhairavi, Bhuvanesvari, Chhinnamasta, Dhumavati, Bagalamukhi, Matangi and Kamala.

=== Tantra and Devis ===
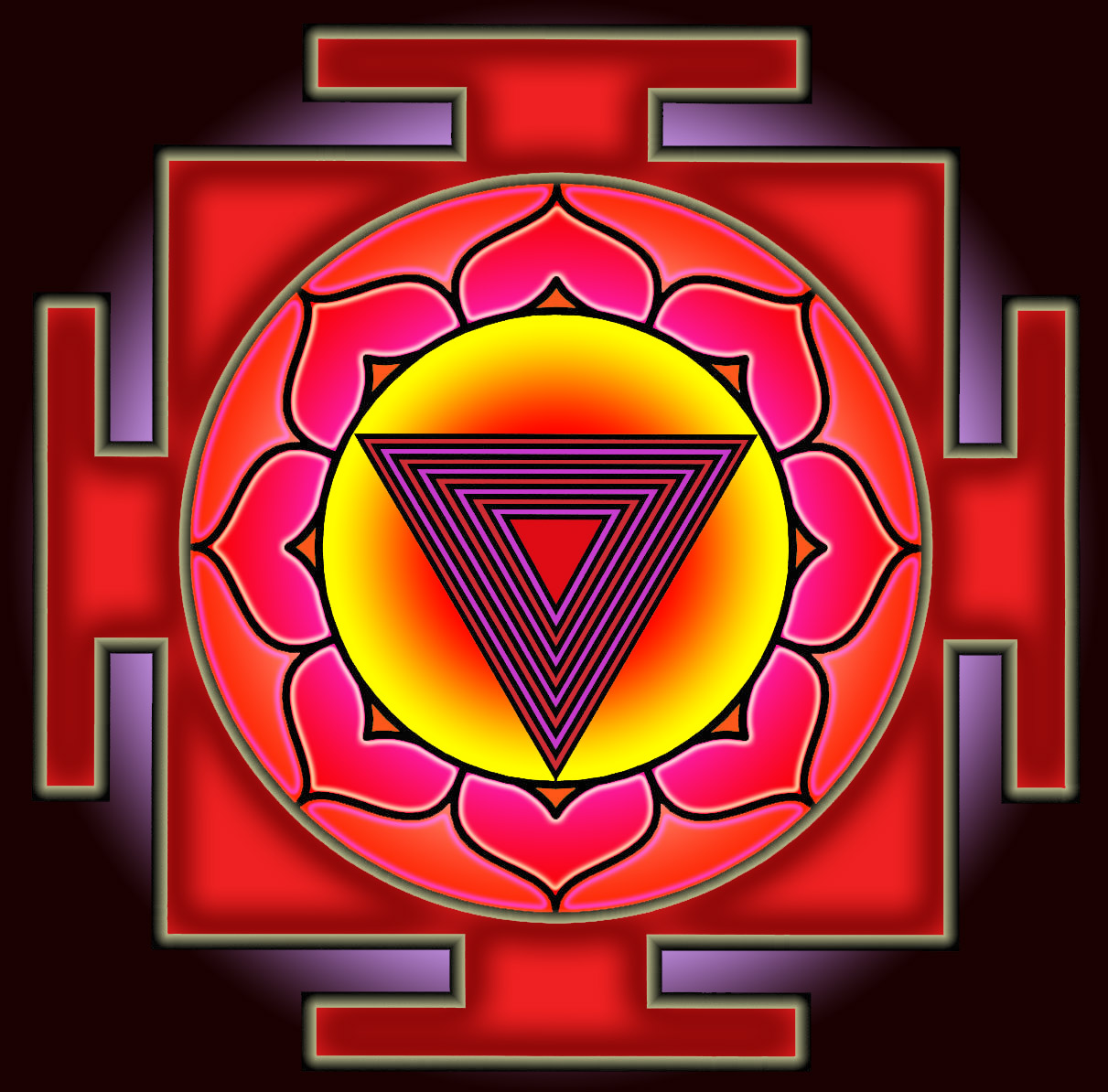
Yantra are used as icons for Devi in Tantra; above is Tripura-Bhairavi yantra

Tantric literature such as Soundarya Lahari meaning "Flood of Beauty", credited to Adi Shankaracharya a shakta or tantric poem, is dedicated to the Supreme Deity of the sect, Parvati who is considered much superior to Shiva. It celebrates Parvati and her feminine persona. It is an approach to the tantra through

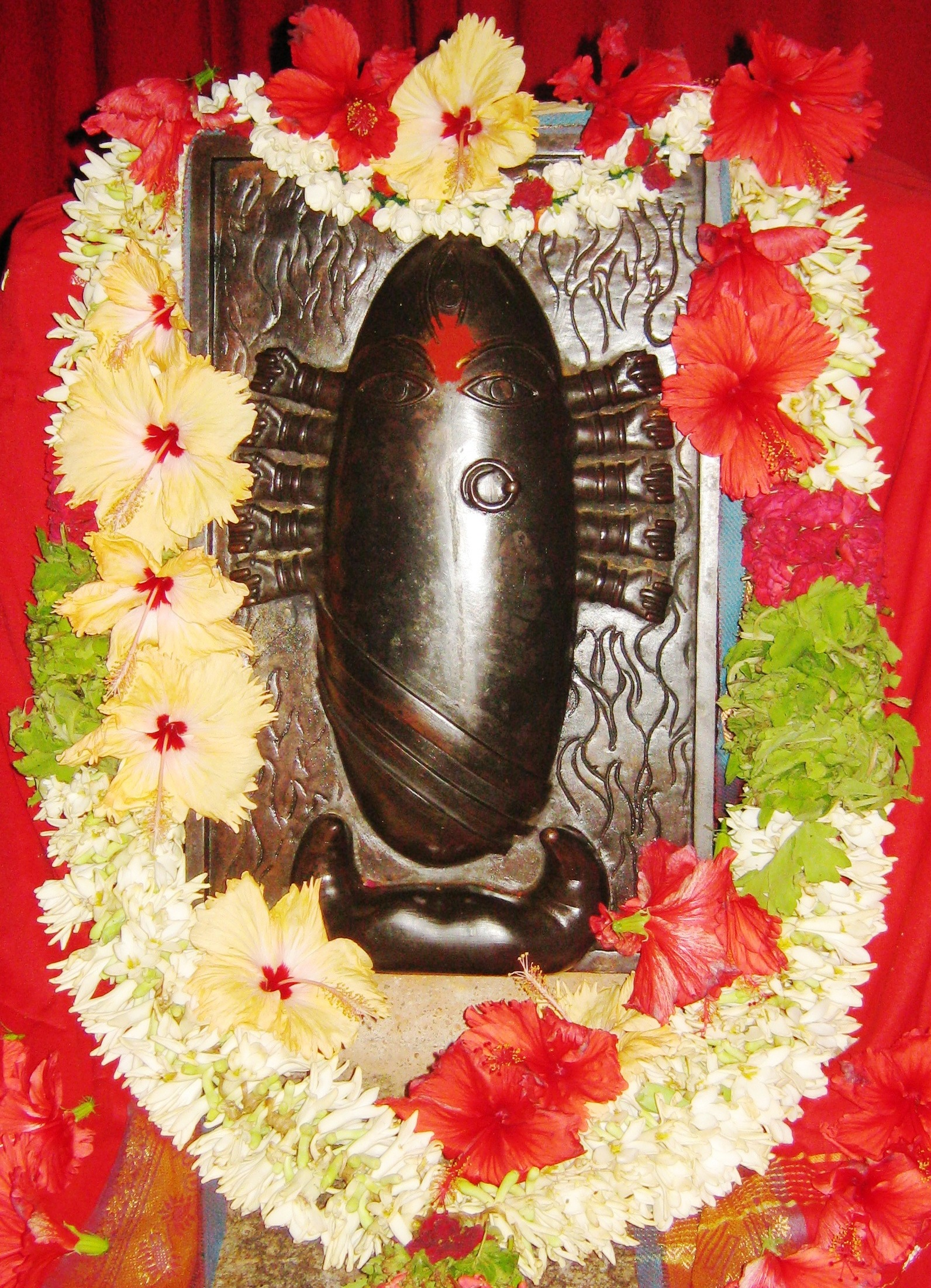
Bhairavi Devi in an Indian temple

Parvati.

In Shakti Tantra traditions, Devis are visualized with yantra and are a tool for spiritual journey for the tantric adept. The adepts ritually construct triangle yantras with proper use of visualization, movement, and mantra. The adepts believe, state John Stratton Hawley and Donna Marie Wulff, that "to establish such yantra is to place the macrocosm within oneself", and doing so can yield temporal benefits, spiritual powers or enlightenment.

A tantric text titled "Vigyan Bhairav Tantra", 'Vigyan' meaning "consciousness" is a conversation between Shiva and Parvati rendered in 112 verses, elaborates on "wisdom and insight of pure consciousness."

Devi Puja is the worship of Parvati which is observed through four forms of Devi Yantra; the first is Tara that exists in the realm of the fourth chakra representing the spiritual heart; Saraswati emanates in the first chakra; Lakshmi forms the second chakra; and Parvati is at the heart of the third chakra and completes the chakra. Worship through this Yantra leads to the realization of "cosmic energy" within oneself.

==== Matrikas ====
Matrikas, that is, the mothers, are seven or eight female divinities, which are depicted as a group. They are Brahmani, Vaishnavi, Maheshvari, Indrani, Kaumari, Varahi and Chamundi or Narasimhi. The Matrikas are an important concept in Tantric traditions. They are described in the Isaanasivagurudevapaddhati as creations to facilitate Shiva's confrontation with his adversary Andhakasura. All the Matrikas are depicted in a sitting position, Lalitasana, and bedecked with heavy jewellery.

Scholars state that the concept of Matrikas as powerful goddesses emerged in the early 1st millennium AD, and possibly much earlier.

The idea of eight mother goddesses together is found in Himalayan Shaivism, while the idea of seven divine mothers (Sapta Matrika) is more common in South India.

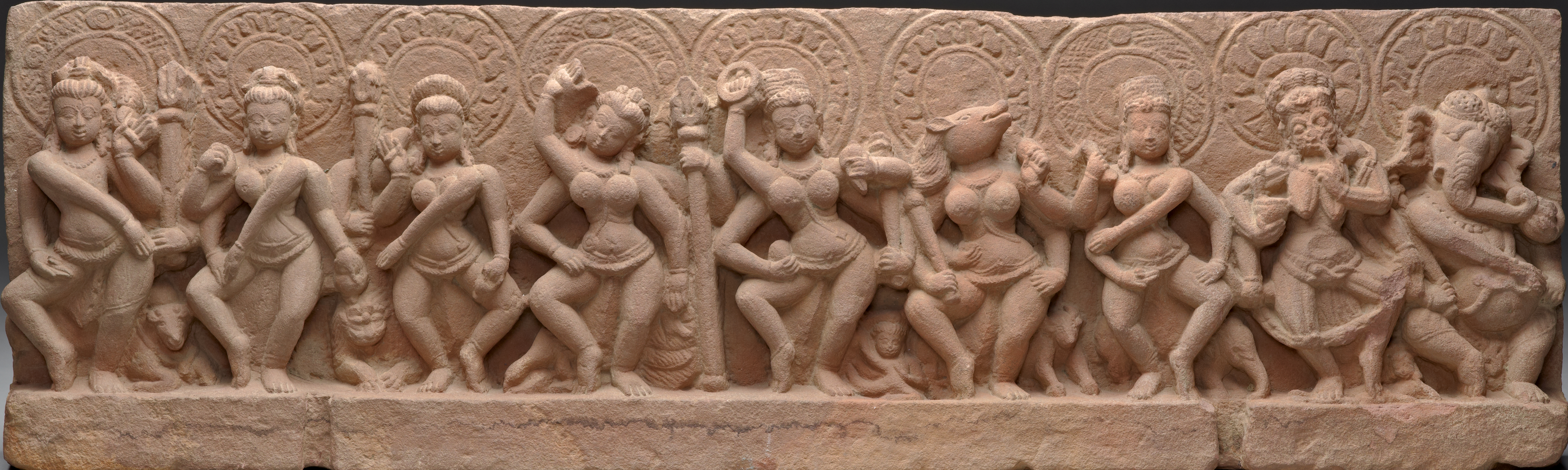
The Devi Matrikas (flanked by Shiva and Ganesha), representing various Shakti aspects, from 9th-century Madhya Pradesh

Navadurgas

Navadurgas, the nine forms of Durgas, are some of the most important manifestations of Devi. The nine forms of Devi are majorly worshipped during Navaratri. They are:

- Shailaputri, daughter of the mountain
- Brahmacharini, who does penance
- Chandraghanta, who has a bell-shaped moon on her head
- Kushmanda, who formed the 'Anda-universe' with the warmth of her smile
- Skandamata, mother of Skanda-Kartikeya
- Katyayani, daughter of the sage Katya
- Kalaratri, who engulfs space and time
- Mahagauri, who has a bright complexion
- Siddhidhatri, who grants the eight Siddhis, namely Anima, Mahima, Garima, Laghima, Prapti, Prakamya, Isitva and Vashitva

These deities are worshipped during Sharad Navaratri and Chaitra Navaratri. In West Bengal, Navaratri is called Durga Puja.

In Devi Kavacham, it is said that those who remember these goddesses will attain success in life and will have the ability to withstand enemies and even fire. According to traditions and Hindu scriptures, Navadurga has different forms. The Agni Purana lists them as Rudrachanda, Prachanda, Chandogra, Chandanayika, Chanda, Chandavati, Chandarupa, Atichandika, and Ugrachanda.

== See also ==
- Deva (Hinduism)
- Shaktism
- Shakti Pitha
- Saundarya Lahari
- Shakti
- Mahadevi - supreme goddess in Hinduism
- Prakṛti – Nature in Hinduism
- Shakti Pitha – Shrines in Shaktism, goddess-focused Hinduism
- Tridevi – Trinity of chief goddesses in Hinduism
- Durga
- Saraswati
- Lakshmi
- Kankeshwari
