= Shobha Bhagawati =

Shobha Bhagawati शोभा भगवती मन्दिर

Religion
- Affiliation: Hinduism

Location
- Location: Kathmandu
- Country: Nepal

Shobha Bhagawati is a shrine to the Hindu goddess Bhagawati on the bank of the Bishnumati River in Kathmandu, Nepal. The Dashain Festival is an important celebration.

The temple has statues of the nine aspects of Durga that are revered as the Hindu goddesses Shailputri, Brahmacharini, Chandraghanta, Kushmanda, Skandmata, Katyayani, Kaalratri, Mahagauri, and Siddhidatri.

== Architecture ==
This temple is built in the Nepali pagoda style of architecture.

== Cemetery ==
The temple precinct also has a cemetery, as many Hindu temples do. It is near the Bisnumati River as Hindu cremation is normally near a river, particularly one linked to the Ganges. A memorial structure adjacent to the temple commemorates Dashrath Chand and Ganga Lal Shrestha, who were executed there.

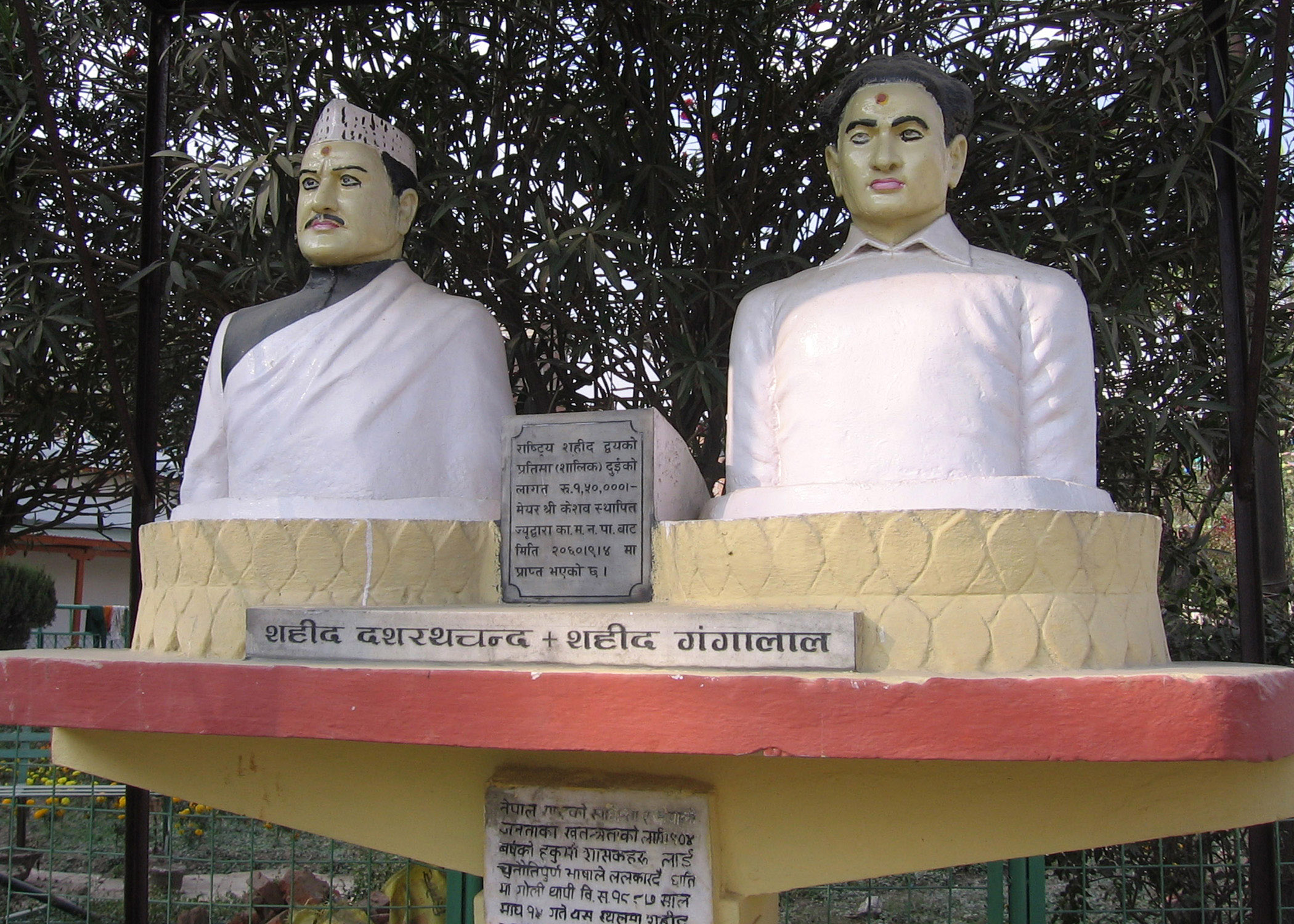
Memorial with statues of Dashrath Chand and Ganga Lal Shrestha.
