= Navadurga =

Nine manifestations of Hindu goddess Durga

- Power, strength, protection, knowledge, wealth, fertility and Moksha
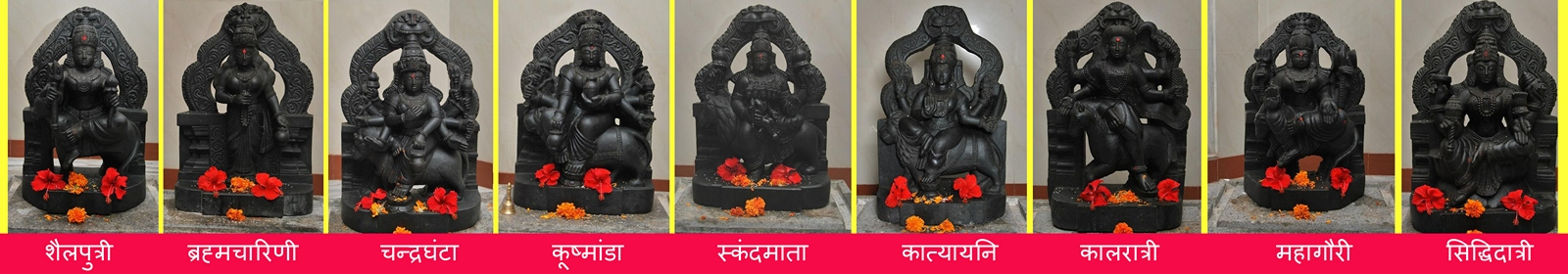
- Navadurga
- Devanagari: नवदुर्गा
- Sanskrit transliteration: navadurgā
- Affiliation: Adi Shakti, Durga, Parvati, Devi
- Mantra: oṁ aim hrīṁ śrīṁ mahādurgāyai namo namaḥ
- Weapon: Khanda (sword), Bow and arrow, Trishula, Sudarshan Chakra, Gada (mace), shield, shankha, Ghanta
- Mount: Lion, tiger, nandi, ox, mule and lotus
- Festivals: Navaratri, Durga Puja, Vijayadashami, Durga Ashtami
- Consort: Shiva

Navadurga (Sanskrit: नवदुर्गा, IAST: Navadurgā), also spelled Navdurga and Navadurgas, are nine manifestations and forms of Durga in Hinduism, especially worshipped during Navaratri and Durga Puja. They are often considered collectively as a single deity, mainly among the followers of Shaktism and Shaivism sect of Hinduism.

According to Hindu mythology, the nine forms are considered the nine stages of Durga during the nine-day long duration of the war with demon-king Mahishasura, where the tenth day is celebrated as the Vijayadashami (lit. 'victory day') among the Hindus and is considered as one of the most important festivals.

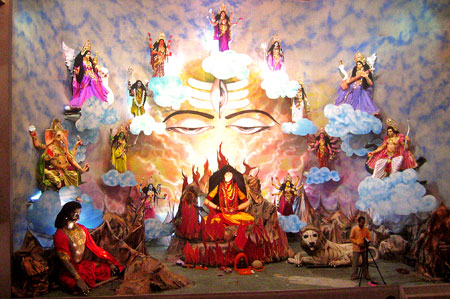
The yantra of Nava-Durga (Durga surrounded by nine shaktis)

== Background and Puja (prayer) ==
During the festival of Navaratri, nine unmarried virgin girls up to the age of nine years are worshipped and fed as they are considered to be the incarnations of these nine goddesses. The nabapatrika (Literally 'nine leaves') ritual during Durga Puja involves tying the branches of eight plants with their leaves with a banana plant (naba meaning 'nine' in Sanskrit, and patrika meaning 'leaves').

== The nine forms ==
The main nine forms of Durga worshipped in Hinduism:

S. No.	Image (Depiction)	Name	Vahana	Stage (Note: Parvati has been described in the nine stage in nine different depiction, where she become the Maha Shakti in last stage of Siddhidhatri, after gaining Siddhis.)	Mantra	Depiction	Ref
1.		Shailaputri "The Daughter of a Mountain"	Nandi (bull)	Parvati in her stage of childhood with the divine and principal form being Durga	ॐ देवी शैलपुत्र्यै नमः	She is adorned with light ornamentation on her limbs and was clothed in red and pink robes. She has two hands both holding a trident and lotus. She is seated upon the behind of a white bull.	
2.		Brahmacharini "The Mother of devotion and penance"	None	Durga in her phase of asceticism.	ॐ देवी ब्रह्मचारिण्यै नम:	She is dressed as a female ascetic and is adorned by dried-up Rudraksha beads and flowers as her ornamentation. She has two hands, both of which carried a rosary and a water utensil.	
3.		Chandraghanta "The Destroyer of demons"	Tiger	Durga in the form of Shakti.	ॐ देवी चंद्रघण्टायै नम:	She has ten hands, nine of them are armed by a trident, mace, bow, arrow, lotus, sword, bell and a waterpot, while one other hand blesses her devotees. She is seated upon a fierce tiger.	
4.		Kushmanda "The Goddess of The Cosmic Egg"	Lion	Durga in the form of Mahashakti.	ॐ ऐं ह्रीं क्लीं कूष्मांडायै नम:	She has eight hands, six of which held a discus, mace, lotus, bow, and arrow in one hand, sword and rosary and the two other hands carried a jar of honey and waterpot. She is mounted upon the back of a lion.	
5.		Skandamata "The Goddess of motherhood and children"	Lion	Durga in her stage of motherhood.	ॐ देवी स्कन्दमातायै नम:	She has four hands, two of which held lotuses, the third holding her son, the six-headed infant Kartikeya seated on her lap, and the fourth saves her devotees. She is seated upon the back of a lion.	
6.		Katyayani "The Goddess of Power"	Lion	Durga in the warrior stage, ready to fight any Asura.	ॐ देवी कात्यायन्यै नम:	She is adorned with heavy ornamentation on her limbs and is dressed in green and pink vestments. Her four hands each carried a sword, shield, lotus and trident. She's seen seated on a fearsome lion.	
7.		Kalaratri "The Goddess of Auspiciousness and Courage"	Donkey	Durga in her form of destruction.	ॐ देवी कालरात्र्यै नम:	She has three bloodshot eyes, unkempt hairs, and wears a garland of skulls around her neck, which shone like lightning. Her four hands all held a trident, scimitar, vajra, and a cup. She is seated upon the behind of a donkey as her vehicle mount.	
8.		Mahagauri "The Goddess of Beauty and Women"	Ox	Durga in her form of recovery.	ॐ देवी महागौर्यै नम:	She has four hands, three of which carried a trident, mini-drum, and a pink lotus while her one hand promised her devotees protection. She is seated upon a white ox.	
9.		Siddhidhatri " The Goddess of Supernatural Powers or Siddhis"	Lotus	Durga in her stage of reaching her highest and supreme form as Mahashakti.	ॐ ऐं ह्रीं क्लीं सिद्धिदात्र्यै नम:	Each of her four hands carried a discus, conch shell, pink lotus and a mace. She is seated upon a fully bloomed lotus.	

=== Agni Purana ===
The Agni Purana lists the Navadurgas as:

1. Rudrachanda
2. Prachanda
3. Chandogra
4. Chandanayika
5. Chanda
6. Chandavati
7. Chandarupa
8. Atichandika
9. Ugrachanda

== See also ==
- Hindu deities
- Shaivism
- Shaktism
- Navaratri
- Mahavidya
- Matrikas

== Sources ==
- "Navratri 2021: What are the nine forms of Maa Durga and the special prasad offered to them". The Times of India. 7 October 2021.
- Ramachandran, Nalini (2020). Nava Durga: The Nine Forms of the Goddess. Penguin Books. ISBN 978-93-5305-981-1.
- Amazzone, Laura (2010). Goddess Durga and Sacred Female Power. University Press of America. ISBN 978-0-7618-5313-8.
- Ostor, Akos (2004). The Play of the Gods: Locality, Ideology, Structure, and Time in the Festivals of a Bengali Town. Orient Blackswan. ISBN 978-81-8028-013-9.
- Mishra, P. K. (1989). Culture, Tribal History, and Freedom Movement: Dr. N.K. Sahu Commemoration Volume. Agam Kala Prakashan.
- Pintchman, Tracy (2001). Seeking Mahādevī: Constructing the Identities of the Hindu Great Goddess. State University of New York Press. ISBN 9780791490495.
- Sharma, Vidya Sagar (2021). Mata Vaishno Devi (Prabhat Prakashan) (in Hindi). Prabhat Prakashan. ISBN 978-81-7315-903-9.
- Mittal, J. P. (2006). History Of Ancient India (a New Version) : From 7300 Bb To 4250 Bc. Atlantic Publishers & Dist. ISBN 978-81-269-0615-4.
- Sivkishen (2015). Kingdom of Shiva. Diamond Pocket Books Pvt Ltd. ISBN 978-81-288-3028-0.
