= Kalaratri =

Seventh form of the goddess Mahadevi

- Goddess of Auspiciousness and Courage
- Member of Navadurga
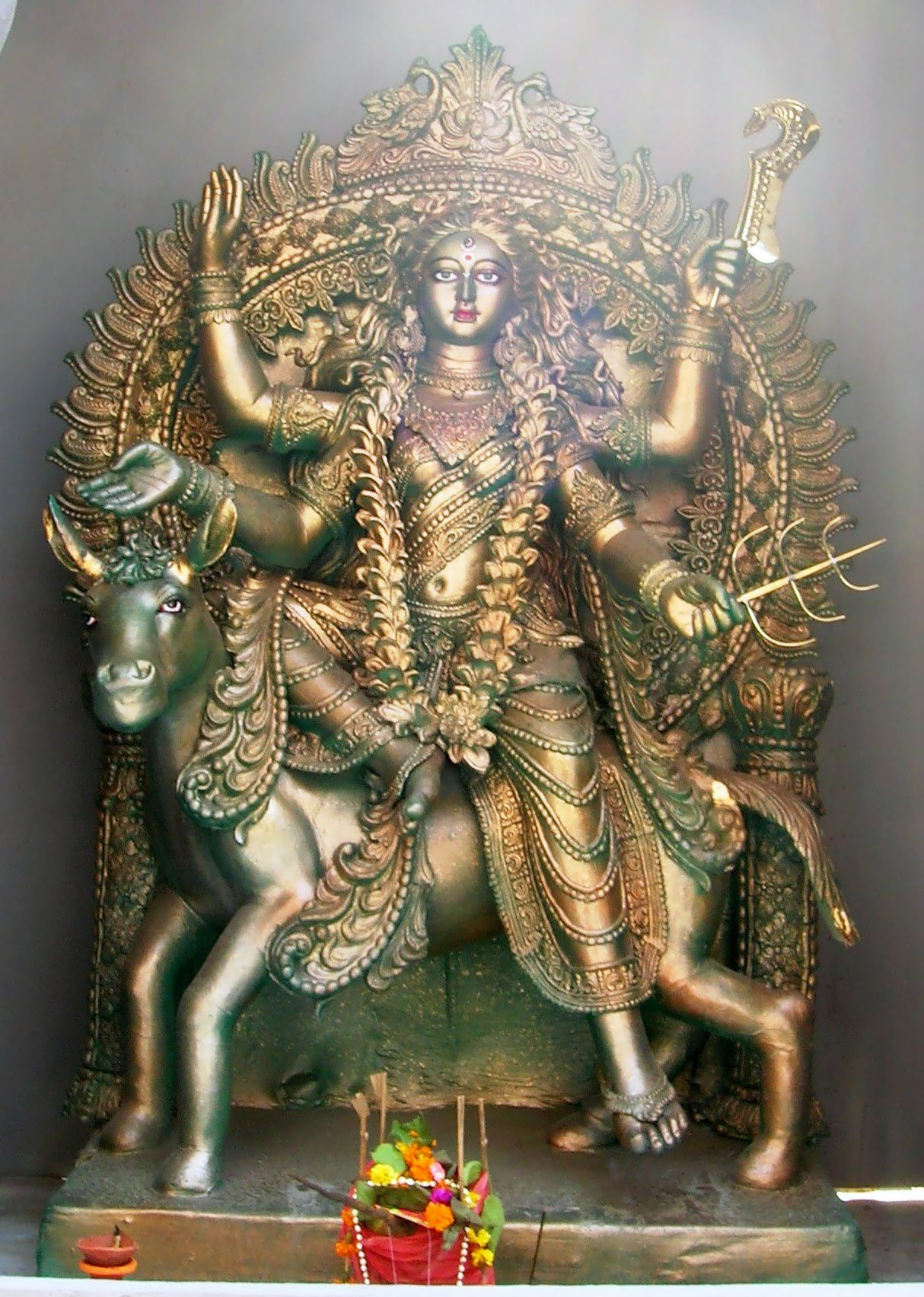
- A statue of Kalratri
- Planet: Rahu
- Mantra: एकवेणी जपकर्णपुरा नग्न कालरात्री भीषणा| दंष्ट्रकराल्वदनं घोरं मुक्तकेश्वरम्|| ललजतक्षं लंबोष्टिं शतकर्णं तथैव च| वामपादोल्लासोल्लोह लतकन्तकभूशणम्||
- Weapon: Shining Vajra and Sickle, Abhayamudra, Varadamudra
- Mount: Mule or Donkey
- Consort: Shiva

Kalaratri (Sanskrit: कालरात्रि, romanized: Kālarātri) is the seventh of the nine Navadurga forms of the goddess Mahadevi. She is first referenced in the Devi Mahatmya. Kalaratri is one of the fearsome forms of the goddess. It is not uncommon to find the names Kali and Kalaratri being used interchangeably, although these two deities are argued to be separate entities by some. Kali is first mentioned in Hinduism as a distinct goddess around 300 BCE in the Mahabharata, which is thought to have been written between the 5th and 2nd centuries BCE (with possible oral transmission from a much earlier period).

Kalaratri is traditionally worshipped during the nine nights of Navaratri celebrations. The seventh day of Navaratri in particular is dedicated to her, and she is considered the fiercest form of the goddess, her appearance itself invoking fear. This form of the goddess is believed to be the destroyer of all demon entities, ghosts, evil spirits and negative energies, who are said to flee upon knowing of her arrival.

The Saudhikagama, an ancient Tantric text from Orissa referenced in the Silpa Prakasha, describes the goddess Kalaratri as being the goddess ruling over the night portion of every calendar day. She is also associated with the crown chakra (also known as the sahasrara chakra), said to yield the worshipper siddhis (supernatural skills) and nidhis (riches): knowledge, power and wealth in particular.

Kalaratri is also known as Shubankari (शुभंकरी), meaning auspicious in Sanskrit, due to the belief that she always provides positive results to her devotees. Hence, it is believed that she makes her devotees fearless.

Other, less well-known names of this goddess include Raudri and Dhumorna.

== Scriptural references ==
=== Mahabharata ===
One of the earliest references to Kalaratri is found in the Mahabharata (first written down in the 5th century BCE, with additions and alterations continuing on through the 1st century BCE), specifically in the tenth part of the Sauptika Parva (Book of Sleeping). After the battle of the Pandavas and Kauravas, Ashwatthama, the son of Dronacharya, vows to avenge the death of his father. Going against the rules of war in the stealth of the night, he creeps into the Kuru camp dominated by Pandava followers. With the power of Rudra, he attacks and kills the followers in their sleep.

During his frenzied assaults on the followers, Kalaratri appears on the spot.

“.....in her embodied form, a black image, of bloody mouth and bloody eyes, wearing crimson garlands and smeared with crimson unguents, attired in a single piece of red cloth, with a noose in hand, and resembling an elderly lady, employed in chanting a dismal note and standing full before their eyes.”

=== Markandeya Purana ===
Chapter 1 of the Durga Saptashati, verse 75, uses the term Kalaratri to describe Devi:

prakṛtistvaṃca sarvasya guṇatraya vibhāvinī

kāḷarātrirmahārātrirmoharātriśca dāruṇā

You are the primordial cause of everything

Bringing into force the three qualities (sattva, rajas and tamas)

You are the dark might of periodic dissolution

You are the great night of final dissolution and the terrible night of delusion.

=== Skanda Purana ===
The Skanda Purana describes Shiva beseeching his wife, Parvati, to help the gods when they are terrorised by the demon-king, Durgamasur. She accepts and sends Goddess Kalaratri, "...a female whose beauty bewitched the inhabitants of the three worlds [...] by the breath of her mouth she reduced them to ashes."

=== Devi Bhagavata Purana ===
After the goddess Ambika (also known as Kaushiki and Chandika) comes forth from the body of Parvati, Parvati’s skin turns extremely dark, almost black, like the hue of dark clouds. Therefore, Parvati is given the names Kalika and Kalaratri. She is described as having two arms, holding a scimitar and a blood-filled skull cup, and she eventually kills the demon king, Shumbha.

Other scriptural references to Kalaratri include the Lalita Sahasranama (found in the Brahmanda Purana) and Lakshmi Sahasranama.

== Etymology ==
The first part of the word kalaratri is kala. Kala primarily means time, but also means black. This is a masculine noun in Sanskrit. Time, as perceived by ancient Indian mystics, is where everything takes place; the framework on which all creation unfolds. The mystics conceived of kala as a personified deity. This, then, gave rise to the idea of the deified Kala as devourer of all things, in the sense that time devours all. Kalaratri can also mean "the one who is the death of time." In the Mahanirvana Tantra, during the dissolution of the universe, Kala (time) devours the universe and is seen as the supreme creative force, Kali. Kālī is the feminine form of kālam (black, dark-coloured). A nineteenth-century Sanskrit dictionary, the Shabdakalpadrum, states: कालः शिवः । तस्य पत्नीति - काली । kālaḥ śivaḥ । tasya patnīti kālī - "Shiva is Kāla, thus, his wife is Kāli."

The second part of the word kalaratri, is ratri, night, and its origins can be traced to the oldest of the Vedas, the Rigveda and its hymn, Ratrisukta. The sage Kushika, while absorbed in meditation was said to have realised the enveloping power of darkness and thus invoked Ratri (night) as an all-powerful goddess in the form of the hymn. The darkness after sunset became deified. Each period of the night, according to Tantric tradition, is under the sway of a particular terrifying goddess who grants a particular desire to the aspirant. The word kalaratriin Tantra refers to the darkness of night, a state normally frightening to ordinary individuals, but considered beneficial to worshippers of the Goddess.

In latter times, Ratridevi ('Goddess Ratri' or 'Goddess of the Night') came to be identified with a variety of goddesses. Since the colour black is seen to reference the primal darkness before creation, and also the darkness of ignorance. Hence, this form of the goddess is also seen as one who destroys the darkness of ignorance.

Invoking Kalaratri is said to empower the devotee with the devouring quality of time and the all-consuming nature of night, thus allowing all obstacles to be overcome and guaranteeing success in all undertakings.

== Legends ==
Once there were two demons named Shumbha and Nishumbha, who invaded devaloka and defeated the gods. Indra, the king of the gods, along with the other gods went to the Himalayas and prayed adi shakthi for help. Parvati, who was going to Ganga snan, heard their prayers. Another goddess, Chandi ( Ambika) emerged from Parvati's body to destroy the demons.

When Chanda and Munda the generals of Shumbha and Nishumbha came to the battle, The dark goddess Kali (also called Kalaratri) appeared from the forehead of Goddess Chandi and killed them, thus she acquiring the name Chamunda.

Then, a demon named Raktabija arrived. Raktabija had the boon that if any drop of blood of his fell onto the ground, a clone of him would be created. When Chandi attacked him, his spilt blood gave rise to several clones of him. As such, it became impossible to defeat him.

Devi Kalaratri extended her long tongue and consumed the drops of blood, preventing them from reaching the ground, thus neutralising Raktabeeja's power. She slayed him. With her help goddess Chandi kill Shumbha and Nishumbha.

After that she became so fierce and destructive that she started killing whoever came in front of her. All the gods prayed to Shiva to stop her, Shiva lay on the earth. Kali stepped on his chest. By seeing her beloved husband below her foot, she bit her tongue in the guilt, she forgot about the fight, hence Shiva calmed her down.

Another legend says that Chamunda (Kali) was creator of Kalaratri . Kalaratri caught demons Chanda and Munda to Kali. These demons were killed by Chamunda. This story is closely related with another goddess named Chandamari.

She is the power of the darkest of nights. At night, the animal kingdom takes a break from work and all animals fall asleep. As they sleep, their exhaustion is removed. At the time of final dissolution, all the creatures of the world seek shelter onto the lap of the mother goddess. She is death-night. She is Maharatri, (the great night of the periodic dissolution) as well as Moharatri (the night of delusion). At the end of time, when destruction makes its arrival, the goddess transforms herself into Kalaratri, who devours all without leaving any remains.

Yet another legend recounts that, there was a demon named Durgasur who, drove away all the devas from Swarg and snatched four Vedas. Then Parvati created Kalaratri, She was asked to warn Durgasur about the war. Durgasur's guards tried to capture Kalaratri when she turned up as a messenger. Kalaratri then assumed a gigantic form and delivered the warning to him. Subsequently, when Durgasur came to invade Kailash, Parvati battled him and killed him, So she gaining the name Durga.

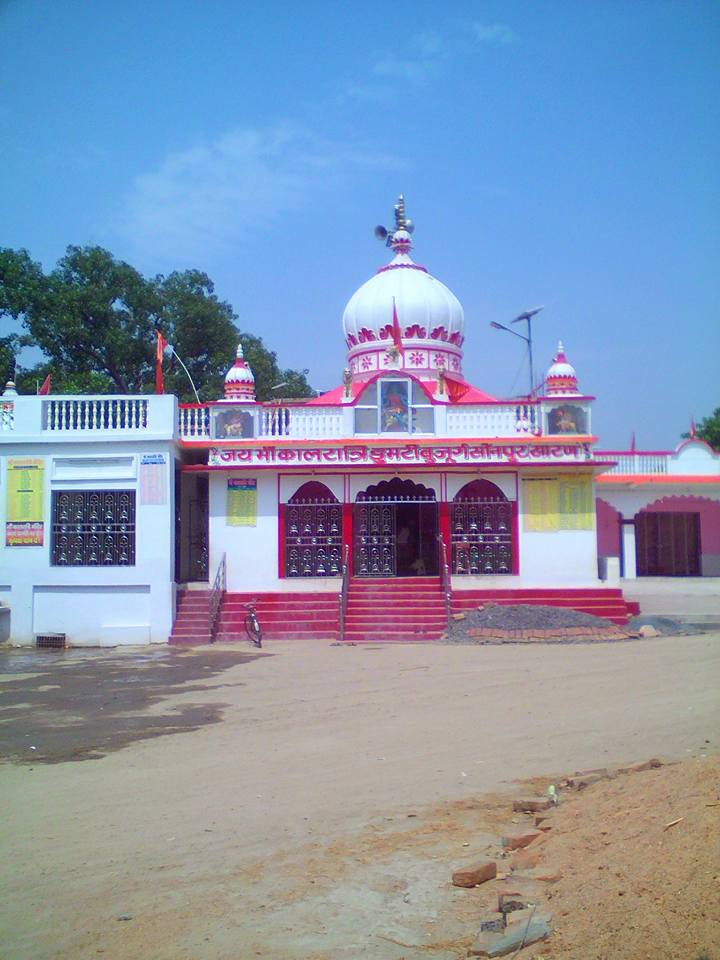
Kalaratri Temple Dumri Buzurg Nayagaon, Bihar, Saran

Kalaratri, the fierce and untamed aspect of Goddess Durga. literally meaning 'The Dark Night, which is the embodiment of power with the colour of darkness (black). She has four hands—the left two hands hold a scimitar and a thunderbolt and the right two are in the varada (blessing) and abhaya (protecting) mudras. The garland worn her neck shines like moon. She has three eyes which emanate rays like lightning. Flames come out of her nostrils when she breathes, She wear red robe, Her mount is the donkey.

The appearance of Kalaratri brings destruction to the wicked. But she always bears good fruits for her devotees and should avoid fear when faced with her, for she removes the darkness of worry from life of such devotees. Her worship on the seventh day of Navratri is given especially high importance by yogis and sādhakas.

== Prayers ==
=== Mantra ===
ॐ देवी कालरात्र्यै नम: Oṃ Devī Kālarātryai Namaḥ

मां कालरात्रि मंत्र- Maa Kalratri Mantra:

या देवी सर्वभूतेषु माँ कालरात्रि रूपेण संस्थिता नमस्तस्यै नमस्तस्यै नमस्तस्यै नमो नम:

ऐं ह्रीं क्लीं चामुण्डायै विच्चे नम:।

सप्तमं कालरात्रिति। सप्तमं कालरात्र्ये नम:।

ॐ ऐं ह्रीं क्लीं श्री कालरात्रि सर्व वश्यं कुरु कुरु वीर्य देहि देहि गणैश्वर्यै नम:।

=== Dhyan Mantra ===
करालवंदना धोरां मुक्तकेशी चतुर्भुजाम्। कालरात्रिं करालिंका दिव्यां विद्युतमाला विभूषिताम॥

Karalvandana dhoram muktkeshi chaturbhujam. Kaal Ratrim karalikaam divyam vidyutmala vibhushitam.

== Temples ==
- Kalratri -Varanasi Temple, D.8/17, Kalika Galli, which is a lane parallel to Annapurna – Vishwanath
- Kalaratri Temple, Dumri Buzurg, Nayagaon, Bihar
- Kalratri -Vindhyachal, Mirzapur (UP).
- Kalratri Temple- Patiala, Punjab
- Kalratri Temple- Sangrur, Punjab

== See also ==
- Kaal Bhairav
