= Kushmanda =

Fourth form of goddess Durga

- Creator of the universe
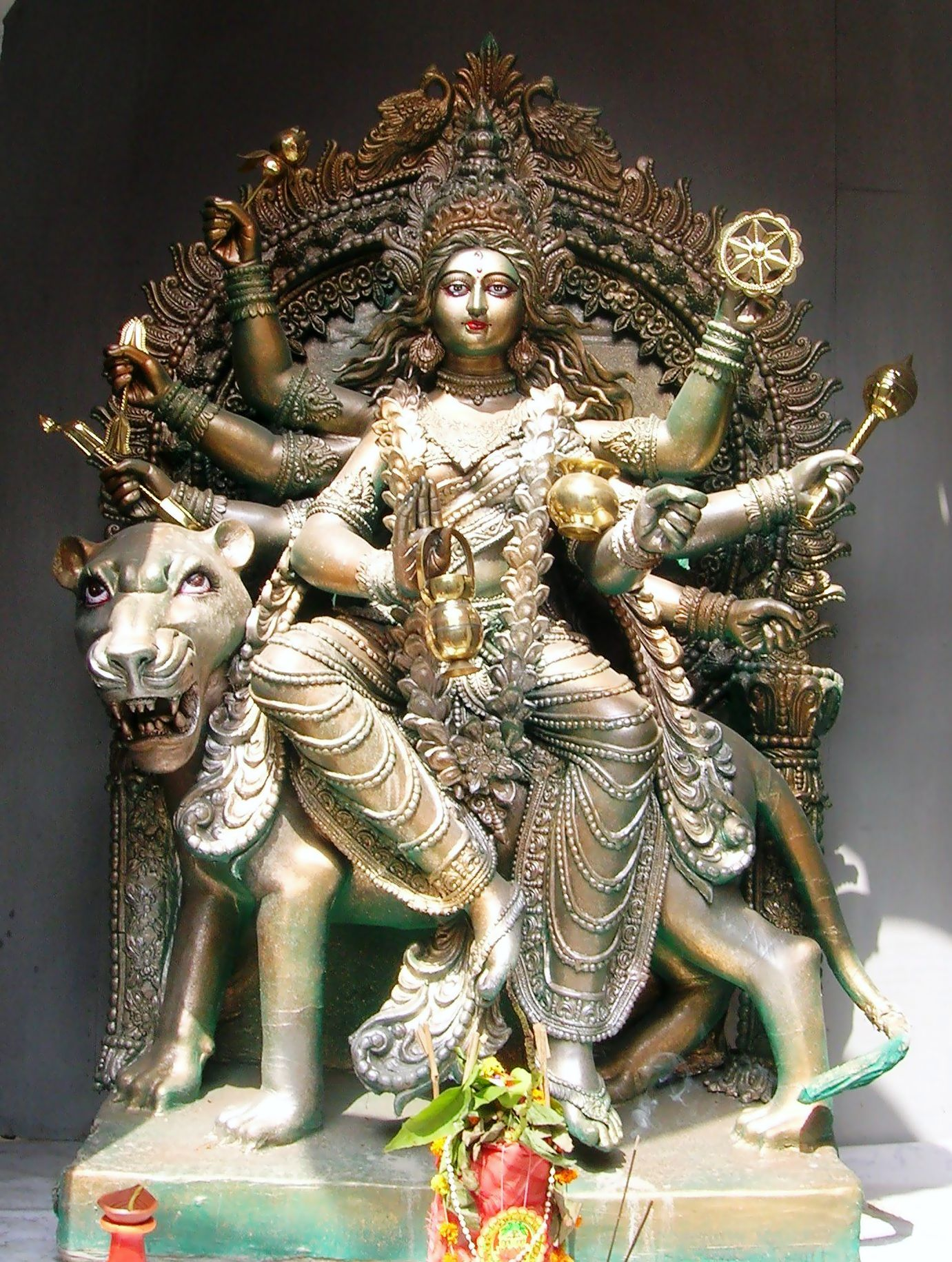
- Statue of goddess Kushmanda
- Affiliation: Avatar of Parvati and Durga
- Abode: Kailasha
- Planet: Surya
- Mantra: surāsampūrṇakalaśaṁ rudhirāplutameva ca dadhānā hastapadmābhyāṁ kūṣmāṇḍā śubhadāstu me
- Weapon: lotus, chakra, kamandalu, bow, arrow, gada, akshamala, amrita
- Mount: tiger
- Consort: Shiva

Kushmanda (Sanskrit: कुष्माण्डा, romanized: Kuṣmāṇḍā, lit. 'little hot egg') is a form of the Hindu goddess Mahadevi, venerated as the creator of the universe, best-known for her act of liberating the energy of the Sun to the rest of creation. She is the fourth of the Navadurga, and is worshipped on the fourth day of Navaratri.

== Iconography ==
Kushmanda is depicted with eight to ten hands, holding a trishula (trident), discus, sword, hook, mace, bow, arrow and two jars of amrita (nectar of immortality), and blood. She displays the abhayamudra gesture with one of her hands, with which she blesses all her devotees. Her mount is a tiger.

== Legend ==
According to a regional legend, after the defeat of the asura Jatukasura, two asuras, Mali and Sumali, the sons of Sukesha, undertook severe penance to propitiate Shiva. Their austerities were described to be so intense that their bodies radiated light visible across the earth, attracting the attention of the sun god, Surya. Overcome by curiosity, Surya departed from his celestial position to observe them. As he drew closer, the heat of the Sun reduced the two asuras to ashes.

Shiva, angered by this, struck Surya with his trishula, rendering him unconscious. The absence of the Sun caused darkness and chaos in the universe. The sage Kashyapa, lamenting the state of his son Surya, cursed Shiva that he would strike down his own son one day. In order to restore order to the cosmos, Shiva appealed to his consort Parvati, who took the place of Surya in the universe by creating a sphere of fire and light. Emerging from this sphere, she appeared in the radiant form of Kushmanda.

Struck by grief, Sukesha and Kashyapa approached Shiva. The deity instructed them to approach Parvati for her guidance. Kashyapa, together with Aditi, appealed to her for the revival of Surya. Parvati brought forth two pots, one of which Kashyapa filled with blood through his ascetic power, while the other was filled with amrita. She instructed Kashyapa to administer the mixture to Surya, reviving him. In gratitude, Kashyapa blessed Parvati that she would have a son destined to be the greatest of the gods.

Sukesha and his wife Devavati presented Parvati with the ashes of their sons, Mali and Sumali. Parvati placed an egg in Devavati’s womb, from which her asura offspring were reborn. Surya requested Kushmanda to reside within the Sun, so that she may continue to grant radiance and direct his movements.

== See also ==
- Navadurga
- Shailaputri
- Chandraghanta
