= Mahagauri =

Eighth form of goddess Durga

- Goddess of beauty and purity
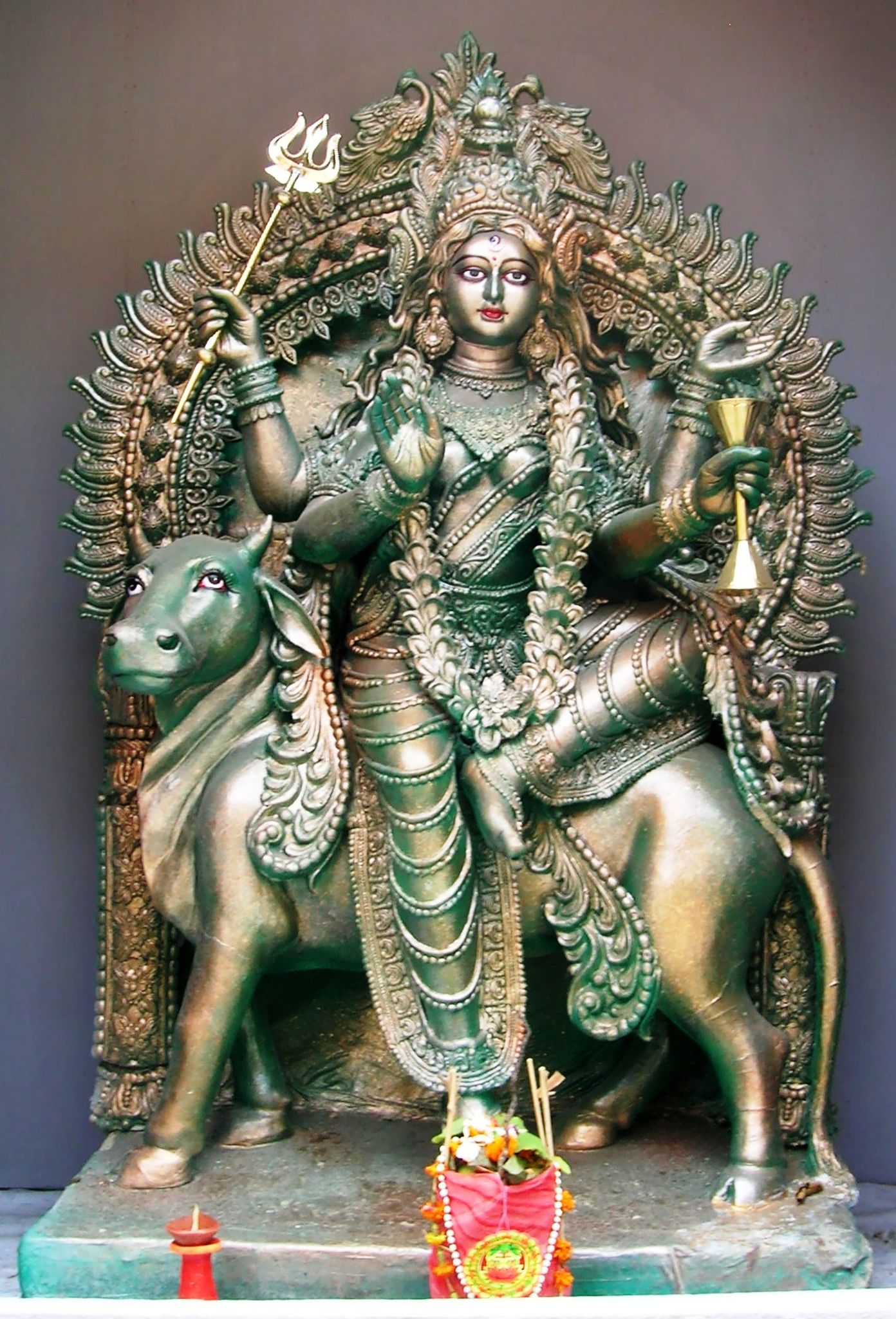
- Murti of Mahagauri
- Affiliation: Navadurga
- Abode: Mount Kailash
- Planet: Jupiter
- Mantra: oṁ devi mahāgauryai namaḥ śvete vṛṣe samārūḍhā śvetāmbaradharā śuciḥ mahāgaurī śubhaṁ dadhān mahādevapramodadā
- Weapon: trident, damaru, abhayamudra, varadamudra
- Mount: Ox
- Festivals: Navaratri, Durga Puja, Durga Ashtami

Genealogy
- Consort: Shiva
- Children: Kartikeya, Ganesha

Mahagauri (Sanskrit: महागौरी, romanized: Mahāgaurī, lit. 'the great fair-complexioned one') is a form of the Hindu goddess Mahadevi, venerated as the goddess of beauty and purity. She is the eighth of the Navadurga, and is worshipped on the eighth day of Navaratri.

== Iconography ==
Mahagauri is usually depicted as riding on a white bull. She is shown with four arms: in her upper right hand she holds a trident, in her upper left a damaru, her lower right hand is in the gesture of abhayamudra, and her lower left hand holds japamala, or varadamudra.

== Legend ==
According to Devi Mahatmya, Two asuras Shumbha and Nishumbha had gained a boon that may only be killed by a virgin from Brahma

In the past Parvati's complexion was dark. Shiva repeatedly called Parvati as Kali (black) to deliberately infuriate her. Parvati was agitated by this teasing, so she performed severe penance to Brahma so as to gain a fair complexion. Brahma, appeased by her devotion, directed her go and bathe in the Ganga river in Himalaya

On the way, She saw the gods who were praying to her for the destruction of Shumbha and Nishumbha, and worriedly asked them who they were worshipping

Parvati went down to Ganges river and bathed. Her dark skin washed off entirely, goddess Kaushiki emerged from her skin. Parvati became a fair woman again, wearing white garments and ornaments, lending her the epithet Mahagauri.

Koushiki went to the battle. She transformed into Chandi (Chandika) and killed asura Dhumralochana. Chanda and Munda were killed by the goddess Chamunda who appeared out from the third eye of Chandi. Chandi then killed Raktabija and his clones, while Chamunda drank their blood. Ultimately goddess Kaushiki killed Shumbha and Nishumbha, that giving her the titles of Mahasaraswati or Ambika. in the Shiva Purana and the Devi Mahatmya (part of the Markandeya Purana) respectively.

According to a legend from the Shiva Purana, Parvati performed intense penance to win Lord Shiva as her husband. After long years of penance, the dust settled on her skin, darkening her appearance. Pleased with her devotion, Lord Shiva blessed her with the promise of marriage. The sacred waters of the Ganga washed away the dust, revealing her radiant, fair complexion, and she came to be known as Mahagauri.”

Mahagauri’s radiant complexion is often compared to the pristine whiteness of the conch, the moon, and jasmine flowers. ‘Maha’ meaning great and ‘Gauri’ meaning purity, Seated on a white bull, she has three eyes and four arms. Dressed in white, her presence exudes purity and calm, a reflection of her serene and benevolent nature.
