= Siddhidhatri =

Ninth form of goddess Durga

- Spiritual attainments and powers
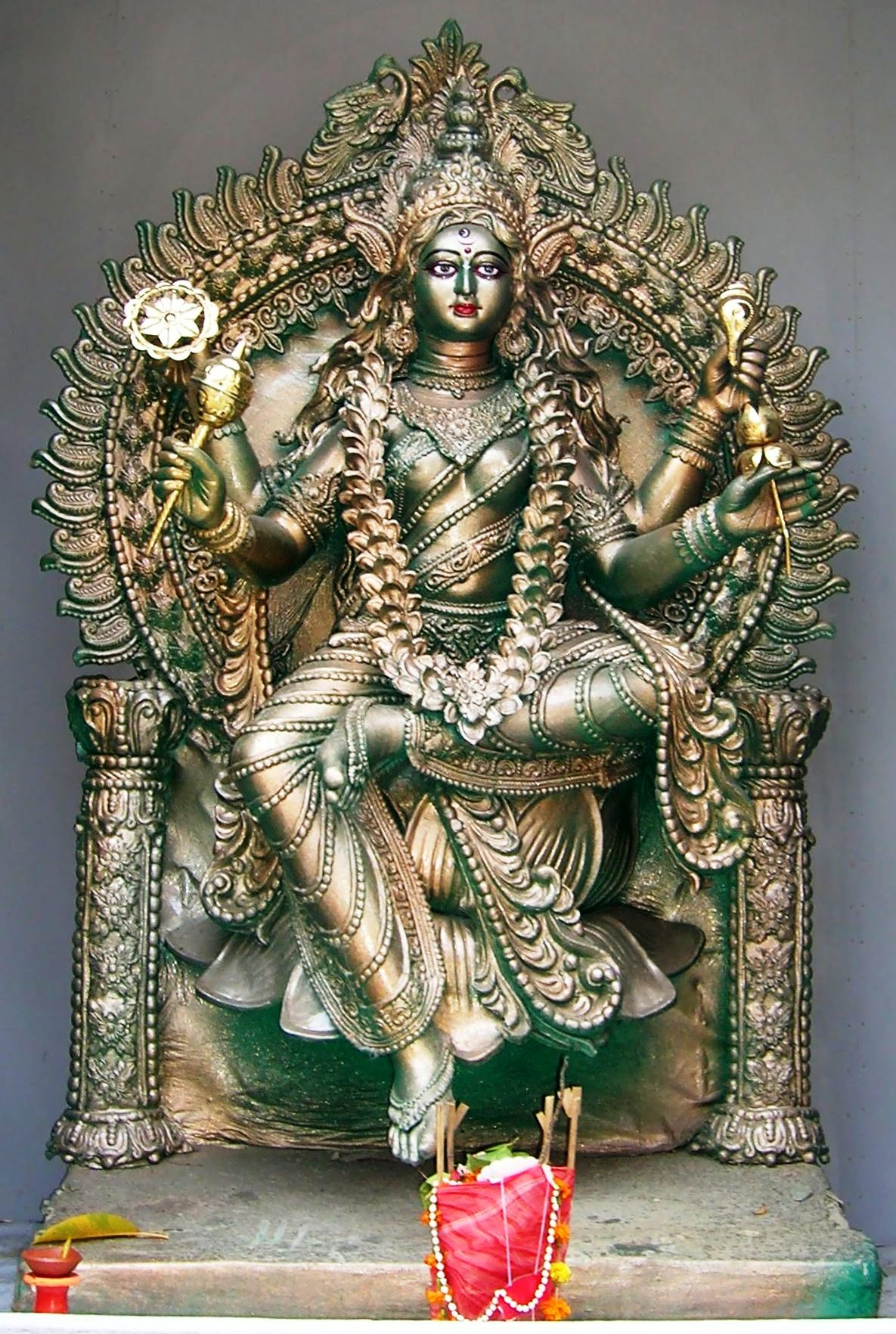
- A statue of Siddhidhatri
- Affiliation: Avatar of Durga
- Planet: Ketu
- Mantra: oṁ deviyai siddhidātriyai namaḥ siddhagandharvayakṣāghair suraiḥ amaraiḥ api sevyamānā sadā bhūyāt siddhidā siddhidāyinī
- Weapon: Gada, Chakram, Shankha, Lotus
- Symbol: Lotus
- Consort: Shiva

Siddhidhatri (Sanskrit: सिद्धिदात्री, romanized: Siddhidātrī, lit. 'The giver of perfections') is a form of the Hindu goddess Mahadevi, venerated as the goddess of siddhis (spiritual attainments and powers). She is the ninth and last of the Navadurga, and is worshipped on the ninth day of Navaratri.

== Iconography ==
The goddess is depicted with four hands holding a chakram (war quoit), shankha (conch shell), a mace, and a lotus. She is seated on either a fully bloomed lotus or a lion as her mount. In some pictorial depictions, she is flanked by gandharvas, yakshas, siddhas, asuras, and devas, who are all portrayed as paying obeisance to the goddess.

== Legend ==
According to a legend, during the beginning of the universe, Shiva worshipped the unmanifest form of the great goddess, Mahadevi, to perform the act of creation. The goddess is said to have emerged from the left half of Shiva as Siddhidhatri. She is also believed to have conferred the eight siddhis (eight spiritual attainments) upon Shiva.

Owing to her origin from Shiva’s left half, this form of the goddess is often associated with the composite deity Ardhanarishvara, in which the left portion represents Parvati.
