= Skandamata =

Fifth form of goddess Durga

- Goddess of motherhood
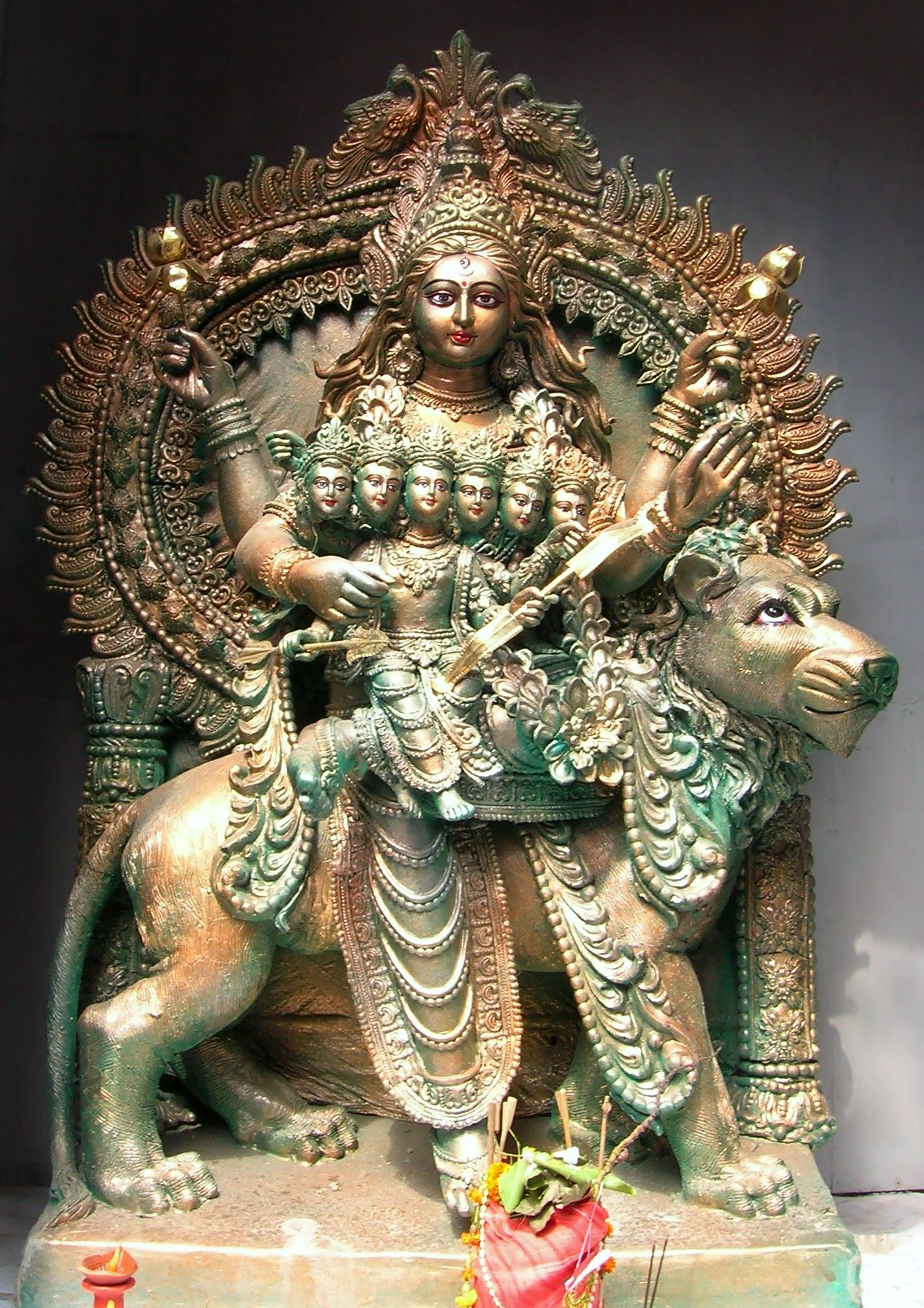
- Depiction of Skandamata
- Affiliation: Navadurga
- Abode: Mount Kailash
- Planet: Moon
- Mantra: oṃ devī skandamātāyai namaḥ siṁhāsanagatā nityaṁ padmāśritakaradvayā śubhadāstu sadā devī skandamātā yaśasvinī
- Mount: Lion

Genealogy
- Consort: Shiva
- Children: Kartikeya

Skandamata (Sanskrit: स्कन्दमाता, romanized: Skandamātā, lit. 'mother of Skanda') is a form of the Hindu goddess Mahadevi, venerated as the mother of the war god Kartikeya, also called Skanda. She is the fifth of the Navadurga, and is worshipped on the fifth day of Navaratri.

== Iconography ==
Skandamata is four-armed, three-eyed, and has a lion as her mount. One of her hands displays the fear-dispelling abhayamudra gesture, while the other is used to hold the infant form of her son Skanda on her lap. Her remaining two lower hands are typically shown holding lotus flowers. She is light-complexioned. As she is often pictured seated on a lotus, she is sometimes referred to as Padamasani.

== Legend ==
According to the Shiva Purana, after their wedding, Shiva and Parvati were enjoying conjugal happiness, lasting this a thousand years. During this period, the gods were disturbed by the increasing destructive activities of asura Taraka. A divine delegation headed by Vishnu and Brahma traveled to Kailasa to meet Shiva. In a hurry to meet the delegation, Shiva allowed his semen to fall to the ground. Urged by the gods, Agni assumed the form of a dove and swallowed it to prevent its loss, but experienced a burning sensation.

Following Shiva’s instructions, Agni deposited the semen on the morning baths of six of the seven sages’ wives. The wives became pregnant and unable to bear the effects, expelled the semen as an embryo, which was deposited in the river Ganga, which carried it to a reed bed, where a boy of divine radiance appeared.

While these events were happening Parvati was furious that her privacy had been disturbed and that Shiva’s semen (vīrya) was being wasted and in the fit of anger cursed the wives of devas who accompanied their husbands on the delegation, to become barren.

The birth of Kartikeya on Kartika Nakshatra of Shashthi Tidhi of Suddha Paksha of Margasirsha month brought the greatest joy to Devi Parvati and Maha Deva. Parvati nourished the child by breastfeeding him, and the gods celebrated the birth. This nurturing and motherly aspect of Parvati came to be called Skandamata. She gifted a divine weapon ‘Shakti’ to her son.

Kartikeya would fulfill his destiny of slaying Taraka, restoring order to the cosmos.
