= Ketu =

Ketu or KETU may refer to:

== Places ==
- Ketu (Benin), a historical location in present-day Benin
- Ketu, Nigeria
- Ketu Municipal District, in Ghana
- Ketu railway station, in China
- Ketu, another name for the mountain K2 on the China–Pakistan border

== Other uses ==
- Ketu (mythology), a god in Hinduism
- KETU, an American radio station
- Candomblé Ketu, a branch of the Candomblé religion of South America
- Lesley Ketu (born 1987), New Zealand rugby union player

== See also ==
- Kétou, Benin, a town
