= Brahmacharini =

Second form of goddess Durga

- Goddess of devotion and penance
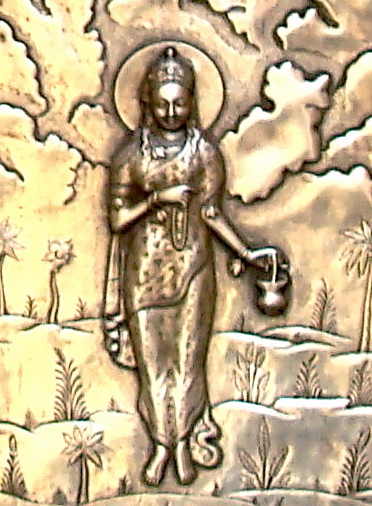
- Brahmacharini
- Affiliation: Avatar of Durga (Parvati)
- Planet: Ketu
- Mantra: oṁ devī brahmacāriṇyai namaḥ दधाना कर पद्माभ्यामक्षमाला कमण्डलू। देवी प्रसीदतु मयि ब्रह्मचारिण्यनुत्तमा॥
- Symbols: kamandalu, lotus, rudraksha, japamala
- Texts: Devi Bhagavata Purana, Devi Gita
- Consort: Shiva

Brahmacharini (Sanskrit: ब्रह्मचारिणी, romanized: Brahmacāriṇī) On the second day of Navratri, Mahadevi takes the form of Brahmacharini. This is a quiet and beautiful form of Parvati , who devoted herself to penace to marry Lord Shiva.

Brahmam signifies ‘penance’, charini means ‘female follower or devotee’. So, Brahmacharini means ‘one who undertakes penance’. She is the second of the Navadurga, and is worshipped on the second day of Navaratri.

In her iconography, Brahmacharini is depicted wearing white clothes, holding a japamala in her right hand and a kamandalu in her left.

== Etymology ==
The word brahmacharini stems from two Sanskrit roots:

1. Brahma (shortened from Brahman), means "the one self-existent Spirit, the Absolute Reality, Universal Self, Personal God, the sacred knowledge".
2. charini is the feminine version of one who is a charya, which means "occupation with, engaging, proceeding, behaviour, conduct, to follow, moving in, going after".

The word brahmacharini in Vedic texts means a woman who pursues sacred religious knowledge.

== Legend ==
According to various versions of the legend, the maiden Parvati once resolved to marry the deity Shiva. Although her parents attempted to dissuade her, she remained steadfast in her determination and undertook a penance that is said to have lasted 5,000 years.

At this time, the gods were troubled by the asura Tarakasura, who had received a boon from Brahma granting him invulnerability except at the hands of a son of Shiva. In order to induce Shiva to marry and father a child, the gods enlisted Kamadeva, the god of love and desire. Kamadeva shot an arrow of desire at the meditating Shiva. Enraged, Shiva opened his third eye and reduced Kamadeva to ashes.

Despite this, Parvati did not waver in her resolve. She adopted the ascetic way of life characteristic of Shiva, dwelling in the mountains, practicing austerities, yoga, and asceticism, and subsisting solely on bael leaves and river water. In this form, she came to be revered as Brahmacharini. Her perseverance eventually drew Shiva’s attention. Disguised, he approached Parvati and attempted to dissuade her by listing his own flaws and peculiarities. Parvati, however, remained undeterred.

During this time, the asura named Prakandasura attacked Parvati with his army of a million asuras. Parvati was at the last stage of her tapas, and was unable to defend herself. Seeing Parvati helpless, the goddesses Lakshmi and Saraswati intervened, but were outnumbered by the asuras. After many days of fighting, the kamandalu beside Parvati fell, and all the asuras were washed away in the resulting flood. Upon opening her eyes, Parvati emitted flames that consumed Prakandasura himself.

The severity of Parvati’s penance impressed the entire universe, though Shiva remained reserved. Eventually, Shiva approached her again in the guise of a brahmachari. He tested her through a series of riddles, all of which she answered correctly. Acknowledging her resolve, he manifested in his true form, and consented to marry her.

== Temples ==
- Maa Brahmacharini Devi Durga Mandir is located at Hanuman ganj, Ballia, Uttar Pradesh
