= Ambika (goddess) =

Mother goddess of Indian origin

- Mother Goddess, Mother of the Universe and all Beings, Brahman (the supreme being in Shaktism), form of Prakriti
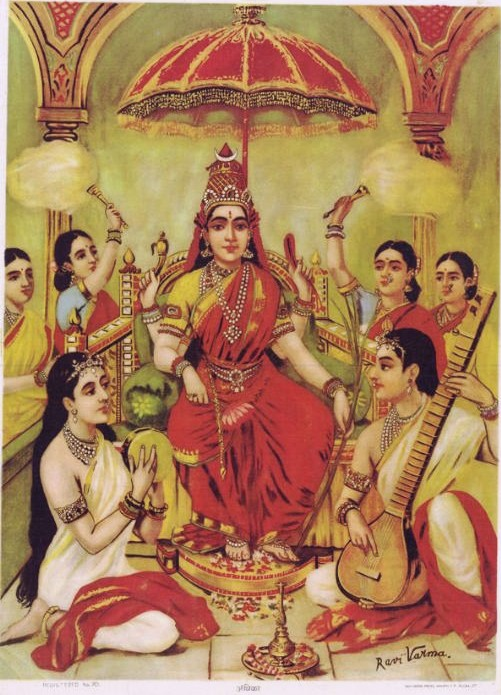
- Painting of Ambika by Raja Ravi Varma
- Affiliation: Parvati, Mahadevi, Durga
- Weapon: Discus, Conch Shell, Trident, Mace, Bow, Sword, Lotus Flower
- Mount: Lion or Tiger
- Texts: Markendeya Purana, Shiva Purana, Skanda Purana

Ambika (Sanskrit अम्बिका, IAST: Ambikā) is a Hindu goddess. Ambika is generally considered an epithet of Mahadevi, Parvati, or Durga.

== Legend ==
According to the Devi Mahatmya, after the asura Mahishasura was slain by Durga, the divinities embarked on a pilgrimage to the Himalayas and sang a hymn of praise in honor of the supreme goddess. Meanwhile, Goddess Parvati had come to the source of the Ganges to bathe and observed the hymn. She asked the divinites to whom the hymn was dedicated. Before they could respond, she shed her outer corporeal form, revealing her true and auspicious form, who is then named Ambika.

In the Vedic tradition, Ambikā is described as the sister of Rudra (Śiva). The Yajurveda (Śukla recension, 3.57) invokes Rudra “together with his sister Ambikā” (svasrā-ambikā). The Shatapatha Brahmana (2.6.2.9) explains this line by stating explicitly that “Ambikā is the name of his (Rudra’s) sister.” A similar reference occurs Taittirīya Brāhmaṇa (1.6.10.5), where Ambikā is again identified in this ritual context. However, in the Taittirīya Āraṇyaka and in Mahānārāyaṇa Upaniṣad of the Atharvaveda, Lord Rudra has been described as the “husband of Ambikā” (Ambikāpati). Sāyaṇa in his commentary on this passage calls Ambikā, the consort of Rudra, as Parvati, the mother of the whole universe.

Sectarian texts such as the Lakshmi Tantra (12th CE) describes Lakshmi as bearing the name or epithet Ambikā.

== See also ==
- Ambika (Jainism) - Yakshi of the 22nd Tirthankara Neminatha, portrayed with children in sculpture.
