= Shailaputri =

First form of goddess Durga

- Daughter of the Mountain
- Member of Navadurga
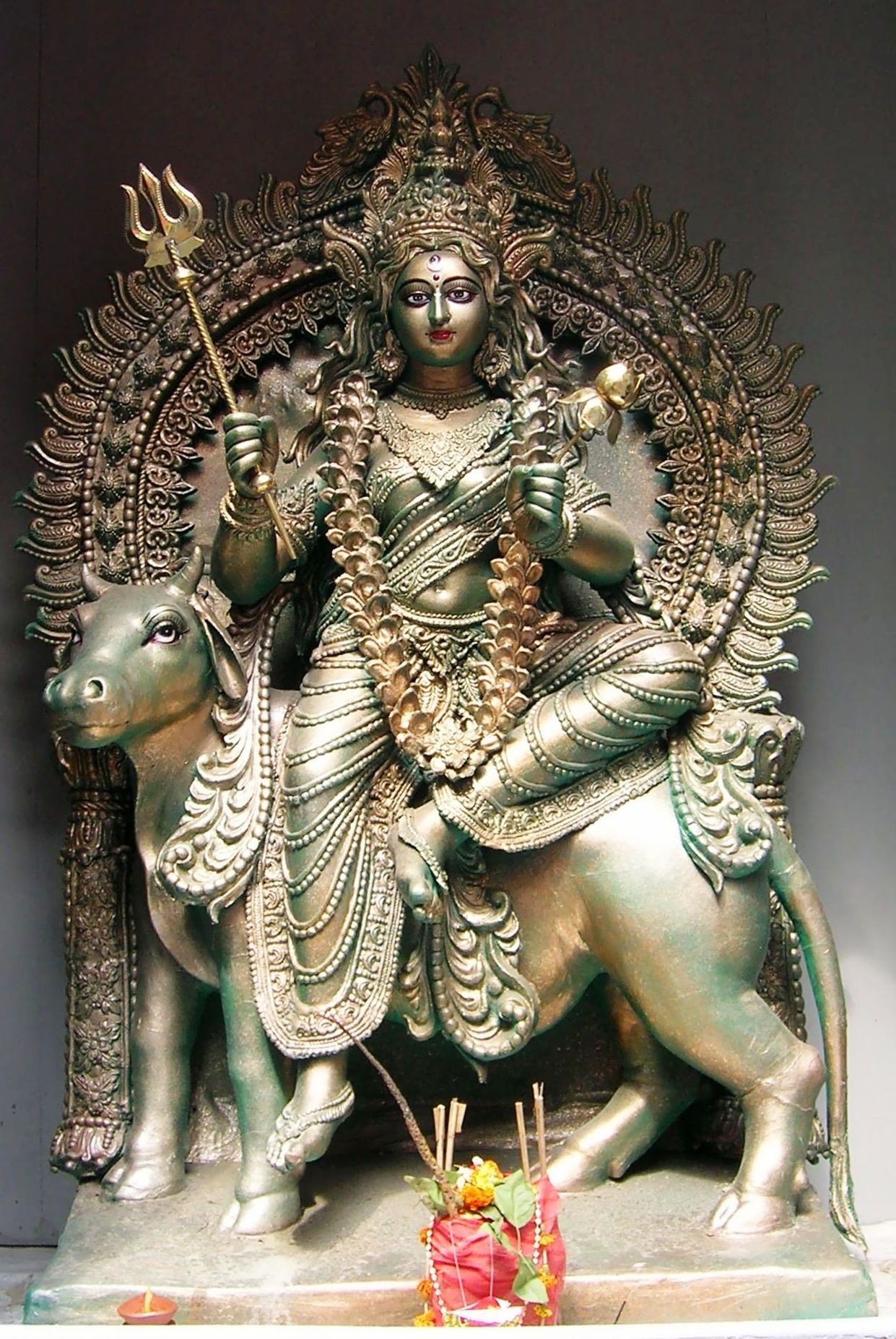
- Shailaputri
- Affiliation: Avatar of Durga (Parvati)
- Abode: Mount Kailash
- Planet: Mercury
- Mantra: Oṃ Devī Śailaputryai Namaḥ
- Weapon: Trident and Cattle-stick
- Mount: Bull

Genealogy
- Parents: Himavat (father); Menavati (mother)
- Consort: Shiva

Shailaputri (Sanskrit: शैलपुत्री, IAST: Śailaputrī) is a form of the Hindu goddess Mahadevi, venerated as Parvati, daughter of the mountain king Himavat. She is the first of the Navadurga, and is worshipped on the first day of Navaratri.

== Iconography ==
Goddess Shailaputri (Parvati) is depicted with two hands and has a crescent moon on her forehead. She holds a trident in her right hand and a lotus flower in the left. She rides on the mount Nandi, the bull.

== History ==
The name “Shailaputri” literally means the daughter (putri) of the mountain (shaila). She is variously known as Sati Bhavani, Parvati or Himavati, the daughter of Himavat - the king of the Himalayas.

The embodiment of the power of Brahma, Vishnu and Shiva, she rides a bull and carries a trident and a lotus in her two hands. In a previous birth, she was Sati, daughter of Daksha. Once Daksha had organized a great yagna (fire sacrifice) and did not invite Sati's husband, Shiva. Sati, infuriated, decided to attend the feast nevertheless. Thereupon, Daksha insulted Shiva. Sati could not tolerate this insult, and thus destroyed Daksha's sacrifice by stepping into the sacrificial fire, immolating herself. In her next birth, she was born as Parvati, the daughter of Himalaya, and married Shiva again.

In yoga, she is seen as the goddess of the root chakra, Muladhara, and upon one's spiritual awakening, she is said to begin her journey upwards towards Shiva, who awaits her at the top chakra at the Sahasrara. In Shaktism, the first day of Navaratri is considered an auspicious day to begin yogic practices and to receive initiations.

== Worship ==
The puja begins with Ghatasthapana, a ritual that symbolises Shakti. The Ghatasthapana puja is performed with symbolic items. A shallow clay dish is used as a base. Three layers of mud and Sapta Dhanya/Navadhanya seeds are then scattered in the dish. The seeds are then sprinkled with water. Then, a Kalasha pot is filled with Ganges water. Supari, a few coins, Akshat (raw rice, coloured with turmeric) and Durva grass are put in the water. After this, five mango leaves are put around the mouth of the pot, which is then covered with a coconut.

=== Prayers ===
Her mantra is La-Ma, i.e.Lama, from Sanskrit Varṇamālā (Sanskrit, n., वर्णमाला). The mantra's focus is on the tip of the tongue, and lips.

Mantra of Shailaputri:

ॐ देवी शैलपुत्र्यै नमः॥
Om Devī Shailaputryai Namah॥

Prarthana or Prayer of Shailaputri

वन्दे वाञ्छितलाभाय चन्द्रार्ध कृतशेखराम् ।
वृषारूढाम् शूलधराम् शैलपुत्रीम् यशस्विनीम् ॥

Vande Vānchhitalābhāya Chandrardhakritashekharam।
Vrishārudhām Shuladharām Shailaputrīm Yashasvinīm॥

"I pay my obeisance to Devi Shailaputri, who bestows upon the choicest boons to the devotees. The moon in the crescent form is adorned as the crown on her forehead. She is mounted on the bullock. She holds a trident in her hand. She is Yashasvini."

== Temples ==
- Shailaputri Temple is located at A-40/11, Marhia Ghat, Varanasi, Uttar Pradesh, India.
- Hedavde Mahalaxmi is located at Hedavde Village, on Mumbai Ahemdabad Highway, Vasai Virar region, Maharashtra, India.
- Shailaputri Temple at Baramulla, Jammu and Kashmir, India
- Shailaputri Zewan Srinagar India. It exists in the form of a Shila which has an ancient big tree in the middle of the Shila. It has a cave on eastern side. Devotees enter into the cave to pray.
- Devi Shailputri temple is located in Sianj village of Mandi district of Himachal Pradesh. Devi resides here in form of murti and Devi's rath is also there. Devi Shailputri is one of the Rajmata (Narol Devi) of Mandi janpad, but was eventually brought out of the Narol by Dev Balakameshwar Banyuri to cure a disease centuries ago.
