= Chandraghanta =

Third form of the Hindu goddess Durga

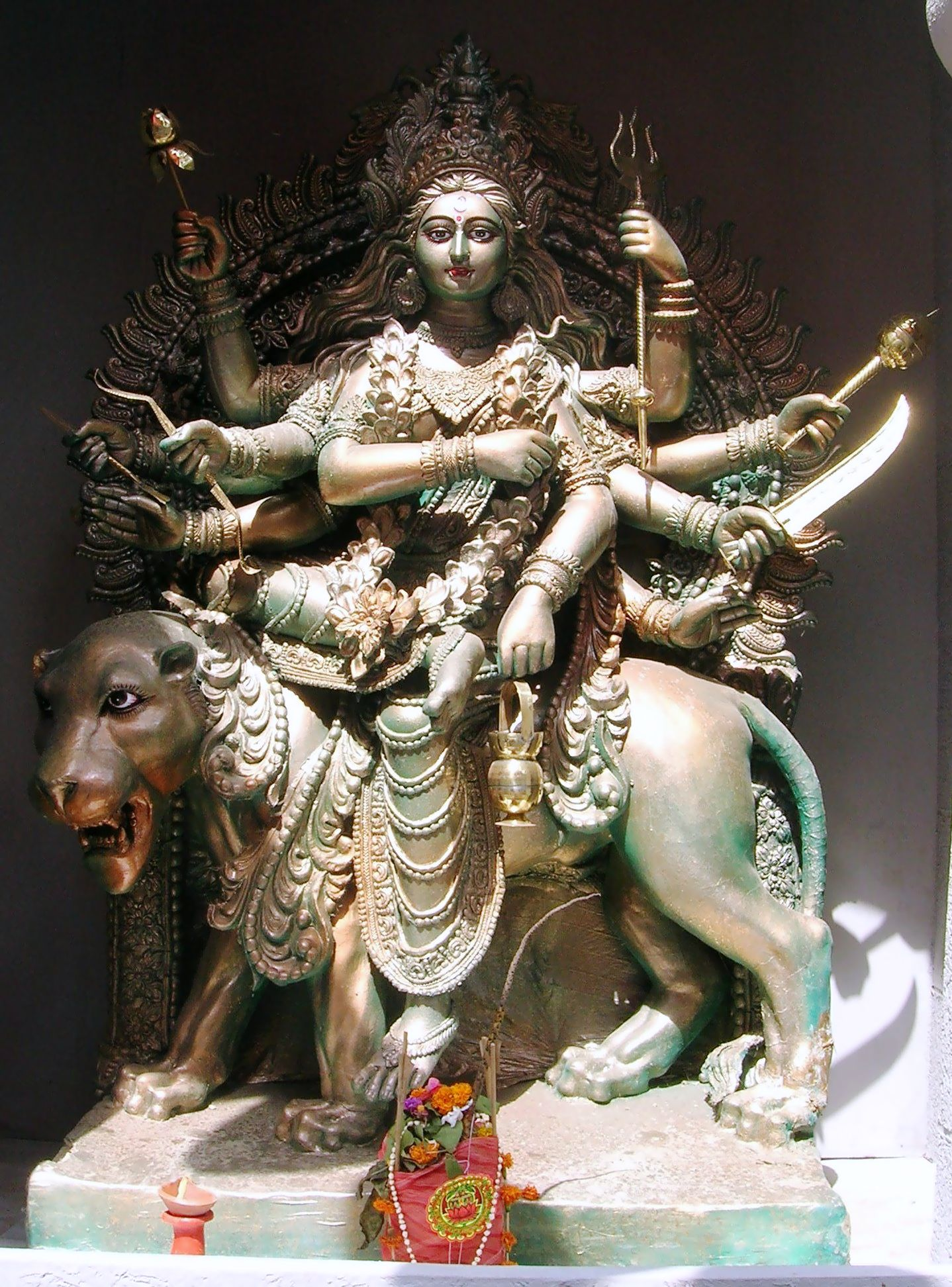
- Murti of Chandraghanta
- Affiliation: Durga, Navadurga
- Mantra: piṇḍajapravarārūḍhā caṇḍakopāstrakairyutā prasādaṁ tanute mahyaṁ candraghaṇṭeti viśrutā
- Weapon: Sword, arrows and other weapons
- Mount: Lion or tiger

Chandraghanta (Sanskrit: चन्द्रघण्टा, romanized: Candraghaṇṭā) is the third of the nine forms of the Hindu goddess Durga collectively known as the Navadurga. She is worshipped on the third day of Navaratri. The Hindi devotional booklet Nava Durga, published by Gita Press, explains her name by reference to the crescent moon on her forehead, which is shaped like a bell.

== Textual tradition ==
Chandraghanta is named as the third Navadurga in the Devī Kavaca, a protective text recited in association with the Durga Saptashati recitation. Verses 3–5 give the traditional sequence of the Navadurgas as Shailaputri, Brahmacharini, Chandraghanta, Kushmanda, Skandamata, Katyayani, Kalaratri, Mahagauri and Siddhidatri.

In this passage, the text supplies the names and order of the Navadurgas but does not relate a separate narrative about Chandraghanta.

== Iconography and worship ==
Gita Press's Nava Durga describes Chandraghanta as having a golden complexion, ten hands and a crescent moon shaped like a bell on her forehead. She carries a sword, arrows and other weapons and rides a lion. Although represented as prepared for battle, she is also described as peaceful and benevolent towards devotees.

The booklet states that the sound of her bell frightens malevolent beings. It associates her worship with the removal of afflictions and obstacles and with the attainment of courage and fearlessness. Chandraghanta is worshipped on the third day of Navaratri, which the booklet associates with the Manipura chakra.

Modern representations are not entirely uniform. Some devotional sources depict Chandraghanta riding a tiger or tigress rather than a lion.

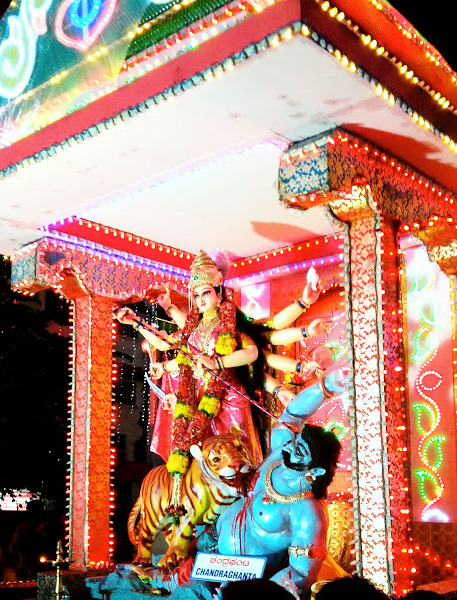
An idol of Chandraghanta displayed during the Mangalore Dasara procession.

== Association with the wedding of Shiva and Parvati ==
Several modern devotional accounts relate a myth in which Chandraghanta is said to be married form of Parvati or associate her manifestation with the wedding of Parvati and Shiva. The accounts differ: some state that Parvati became known as Chandraghanta after wearing a crescent moon following her marriage, while others describe her assuming an armed form when Shiva arrived for the wedding in a fearsome appearance.

A related wedding narrative occurs in the Shiva Purana. In the Rudra Samhita, Parvati Khanda, Shiva arrives at the wedding accompanied by beings of unusual and fearsome appearance. Shiva is described as riding a bull, with five faces, three eyes, matted hair, a crescent moon, ashes smeared over his body and weapons in his hands. On seeing Shiva in this form, Parvati's mother, Mena, becomes frightened and loses consciousness.

After regaining consciousness, Mena objects to the marriage and rejects Shiva because of his fearsome appearance. Narada explains that this appearance was assumed by Shiva as part of his divine sport, but Mena continues to oppose the marriage.

In the following chapter, Narada approaches Shiva and praises him. Shiva then assumes what the English translation describes as a “wonderfully excellent and divine form”. Mena sees Shiva as radiant, smiling and beautifully ornamented. She accepts him as Parvati's bridegroom, asks him to pardon her earlier words and bows before him.

Ramesh Menon's condensed modern retelling similarly narrates Mena's objection to Shiva's appearance and Shiva's subsequent manifestation in a pleasing form.

The cited chapters of the Shiva Purana do not identify Parvati as Chandraghanta or describe her as assuming the form of Chandraghanta during this episode.

== Chitra Ghanta shrine in Varanasi ==
A shrine known as the Chitra Ghanta Devi Temple is situated in the Chowk area of Varanasi. A local temple guide identifies Chitra Ghanta with Chandraghanta and describes her as the third form of Durga, worshipped on the third day of Navaratri.

The guide describes the goddess as golden-complexioned, ten-armed, equipped with weapons and mounted on a lion. It attributes to the Kashi Khanda a local pilgrimage practice involving Chitra Koop, Chitra Gupteshwar and the shrine of Chitra Ghanta Devi.

== See also ==
- Navadurga
- Durga
- Navaratri
- Parvati
- Devi Mahatmya
- Kalyanasundara
- Shiva Purana
