= Siddhi =

Spiritual attainments in Indian religions

In Indian religions, Siddhis (Sanskrit: सिद्धि siddhi; fulfillment, accomplishment) are material, paranormal, supernatural, or otherwise magical powers, abilities, and attainments that are the products of yogic advancement through sādhanās such as meditation and yoga. The term ṛddhi (Pali: iddhi, "psychic powers") is often used interchangeably in Buddhism.

== Etymology ==
Siddhi is a Sanskrit noun which can be translated as "knowledge", "accomplishment", "attainment", or "success".

== Method ==
The Visuddhimagga is one of the texts to give explicit details about how spiritual masters were thought to actually manifest supernormal abilities. It states that abilities such as flying through the air, walking through solid obstructions, diving into the ground, walking on water and so forth are achieved through changing one element, such as earth, into another element, such as air. The individual must master kasina meditation before this is possible. Dipa Ma, who trained via the Visuddhimagga, claimed to have these abilities, but her claim was never independently verified.

== Usage in Hinduism ==
In the Panchatantra, an ancient Indian collection of moral fables, siddhi may be the term for any unusual skill or faculty or capability.

=== Patanjali's Yoga Sutras ===
In Patañjali's Yoga Sutras IV.1 it is stated, Janma auṣadhi mantra tapaḥ samādhijāḥ siddhayaḥ, "Accomplishments may be attained through birth, the use of herbs, incantations, self-discipline or samadhi". Patanjali discusses siddhi in Vibhuti Pada (third chapter) and commentators like Vyasa consider it as a by-product of yogic path due to mastery over prakriti. Verse III.37 warns that siddhis serve as milestones or distractions rather than as the ultimate goal. Verse III.55 further explains that liberation (kaivalya) is achieved through discriminative knowledge, not through mystic powers. Once ignorance is removed through such knowledge, the cycle of rebirth (samsara) ceases.

=== Eight classical siddhis ===
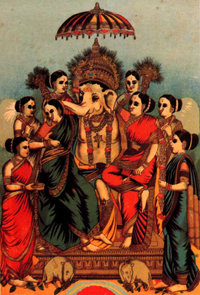
Ganesha with the personified Ashta-Siddhi The Ashtasiddhi are associated with Ganesha. – painting by Raja Ravi Varma (1848–1906)

According to different sources, below are the eight classical siddhis (Ashta Siddhi) or eight great perfections:

- Aṇimā: the ability to reduce one's body to the size of an atom.
- Mahimā: the ability to expand one's body to an infinitely large size.
- Laghimā: the ability to become weightless or lighter than air.
- Garimā: the ability to become heavy or dense.
- Prāpti: the ability to access any place in the world.
- Prākāmya: the ability to realize whatever one desires.
- Īśitva: the ability to control all material elements or natural forces.
- Vaśitva: the ability to force influence upon anyone.

In ISKCON texts, the ability to become heavy or dense (Garimā) is named Mahimā, which (the ability to expand one's body) gets replaced with Kāmāvasāyitā, the ability to take any shape or form one may even whimsically desire.

=== Shaivism ===
In Shaivism, siddhis are defined as "extraordinary powers of the soul, developed through consistent meditation and often uncomfortable and grueling tapas, or awakened naturally through spiritual maturity and yogic sādhanā."

=== Vaishnavism ===
In Vaishnavism, the term siddhi is used in the Sarva-darśana-saṃgraha of Madhvacharya (1238–1317), the founder of Dvaita (dualist) philosophy.

==== Five siddhis, according to Vaishnava doctrine ====
In the Bhagavata Purana, the five siddhis brought on by yoga and meditation are:

1. trikālajñatvam: knowing the past, present and future.
2. advandvam: tolerance of heat, cold and other dualities.
3. para citta ādi abhijñatā: knowing the minds of others, etc.
4. agni arka ambu viṣa ādīnām pratiṣṭambhaḥ: checking the influence of fire, sun, water, poison, etc.
5. aparājayah: remaining unconquered by others.

==== Ten secondary siddhis, according to Vaishnava doctrine ====
In the Bhagavata Purana, Krishna describes the ten secondary siddhis:

- anūrmimattvam: Being undisturbed by hunger, thirst, and other bodily appetites.
- dūraśravaṇa: Hearing things far away.
- dūradarśanam: Seeing things far away.
- manojavah: Moving the body wherever thought goes (teleportation/astral projection).
- kāmarūpam: Assuming any form desired.
- parakāya praveśanam: Entering the bodies of others.
- svachanda mṛtyuh: Dying when one desires.
- devānām saha krīḍā anudarśanam: Witnessing and participating in the pastimes of the gods.
- yathā saṅkalpa saṁsiddhiḥ: Perfect accomplishment of one's determination.
- ājñāpratihatā gatiḥ: Orders or commands being unimpeded.

=== Samkhya philosophy ===
In the Samkhyakarika and Tattvasamasa, there are references to the attainment of eight siddhis by which "one becomes free of the pain of ignorance, one gains knowledge, and experiences bliss". The eight siddhis hinted at by Kapila in the Tattvasamasa are, as explained in verse 51 of the Samkhyakarika:

1. Ūha: based on the samskaras (karmic imprints) of previous births, the attainment of knowledge about the twenty-four tattvas gained by examining the determinable and indeterminable, conscious and non-conscious constituents of creation.
2. Śabda: knowledge gained by associating with an enlightened person (Guru – upadesh).
3. Adhyayana: knowledge gained through study of the Vedas and other standard ancillary texts.
4. Suhṛtprāpti: knowledge gained from a kind-hearted person, while engaged in the spread of knowledge.
5. Dānā: knowledge gained regardless of one’s own needs while attending to the requirements of those engaged in the search of the highest truth.
6. Ādhyātmika-duḥkhabighāta: freedom from pain, disappointment, etc. that may arise due to lack of spiritual, metaphysical, mystic knowledge and experience.
7. Ādhibhautika-duḥkhabighāta: freedom from pain etc. arising from possessing and being attached to various materialistic gains.
8. Ādhidaivika-duḥkhabighāta: freedom from pain etc. caused by fate or due to reliance on fate.

It is believed that the attainment of these eight siddhis renders one free of the pain of ignorance and gives one knowledge and bliss.

=== Hindu deities associated with gaining siddhi ===
Ganesha, Hanuman, various forms of Devi, Vishnu and various other deities are popularly seen as the keepers of siddhis, with the ability to grant them to the worshipper. The attainment of such siddhis is a more pronounced goal in Shaivism. Notably, Hanuman is an incarnation of Shiva, and Ganesh is His son. The last day of Navaratri, the celebration of the pastimes and forms of Goddess Parvati, the wife of Shiva, is for Siddhidhatri, quite literally "She who has the power to grant the Siddhis". According to the lore of the Puranas, it becomes apparent that Shiva is in fact the holder and releaser of such important and powerful abilities.

== Usage in Sikhism ==
In Sikhism, siddhi means "insight". "Eight Siddhis" is a term used for insight of the eight qualities of Nirankar or a.k.a. Akal Purakh mentioned in the Mul Mantar in the Guru Granth Sahib. God has eight qualities: Ek Onkar, Satnam, Kartapurakh, Nirbhao, Nirvair, AkaalMurat, Ajooni and Svaibhang. The one who has insight into these qualities is called Sidh or Gurmukh.

1. Ek Onkar: There is one formless God
2. Satnam: God is True, His remembrance is true
3. Kartapurakh: God alone is creator
4. Nirbhao: God is fearless
5. Nirvair: God has no enmity with anyone
6. Akaal Murat: God is eternal, beyond time
7. Ajooni Svaibhang: God is beyond the cycle of birth and death, God is svayambhu, Self-Existent
8. Gurparasad: God is attained by the Grace of the True Guru

Sidh means the one who has mastered his self.

== Usage in Vajrayana Buddhism ==
In Tantric Buddhism, siddhi specifically refers to the acquisition of supernatural powers by psychic or magical means or the supposed faculty so acquired. These powers include items such as clairvoyance, levitation, bilocation and astral projection, materialization, and having access to memories from past lives.

== See also ==
- Abhijñā
- Iddhi
- Karamat
- Pranahuti

== Sources ==
- Apte, A (n.d.), A Practical Sanskrit Dictionary
- Iyengar, B.K.S. (2002), Light on the Yoga Sūtras of Patañjali, Hammersmith, London, UK: Thorsons
