= Kuladevata =

Ancestral tutelary deity in Hinduism

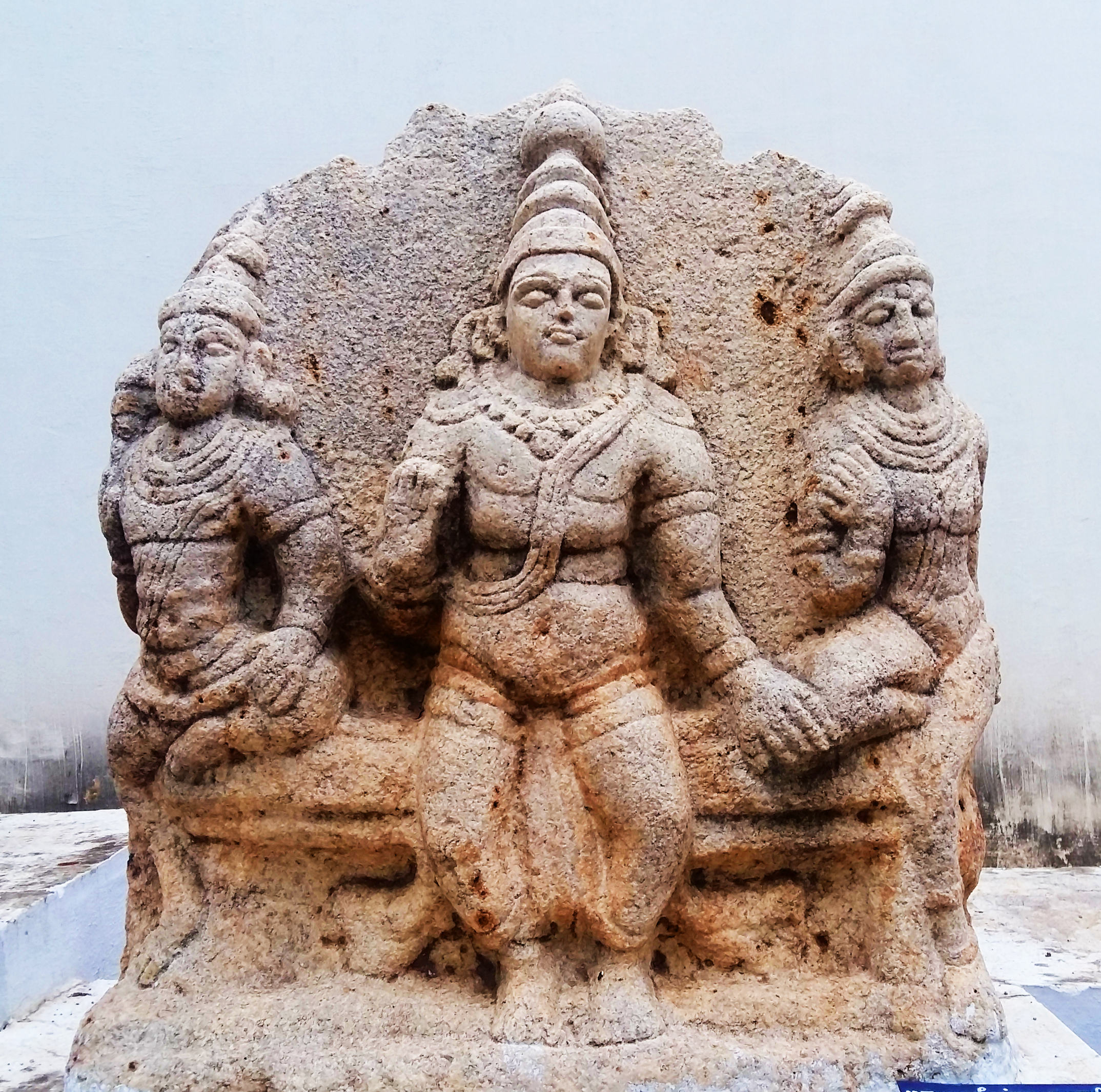
Madurai Veeran with his consorts, a kuladevata of communities in Madurai.

A kuladevata (Sanskrit: कुलदेवता, romanized: Kuladevatā, lit. 'clan deity'), also known as a kuladaivaṃ (Malayalam: കുലദൈവം, Telugu: కులదైవం), is an ancestral tutelary deity in Hinduism and Jainism.

Such a deity is often the object of one's devotion (bhakti), and is coaxed to watch over one's clan (kula), gotra, family, and children from misfortune. This is distinct from an ishta-devata (personal tutelar) and a grāmadevatā (village deities).

A male deity is called a kuladeva and female deity kuladevi (sometimes spelled kuldev and kuldevi respectively).

== Etymology ==
The word kuladevata is derived from two words: kula, meaning clan, and devata, meaning deity, referring to the ancestral deities that are worshipped by particular clans.

== Veneration ==
Kuladaivams of the Shaiva tradition are often considered to be forms of Shiva and Parvati, while those of the Vaishnava tradition are often regarded to be forms of Vishnu and Lakshmi.

Due to the veneration of holy men (babas) in several regions of the subcontinent, several communities consider such men to be their kuladevatas in the place of a deity.

In western India, some communities regard local monarchs who belonged to their clan to be their kuladevata.

== Examples ==
The following is a non-exhaustive list of the various kuladevatas revered in different regions of the Indian subcontinent:

Non-exhaustive list of kuladevatas
Region	State	Name	Ref.
Northern India	Jammu and Kashmir	Baba Mandlik ji	
Northern India	Jammu and Kashmir	Baba Kaliveer ji	
Northern India	Jammu and Kashmir	Mata Mal Devi ji	
Northern India	Jammu and Kashmir	Baba Surgal Dev ji	
Northern India	Jammu and Kashmir	Baba Siddh Goriya Nath ji	
Northern India	Himachal Pradesh	Kamrunag devta	
Northern India	Himachal Pradesh	Murai Mata	
Northern India	Uttar Pradesh	Shiva	
Northern India	Uttar Pradesh	Durga	
Northern India	Uttar Pradesh	Kali	
Northern India	Uttar Pradesh	Bhairava	
Northern India	Uttar Pradesh	Hanuman	
Northern India	Uttar Pradesh	Krishna	
Northern India	Uttar Pradesh	Shitala	
Northern India	Uttar Pradesh	Gogaji	
Northern India	Uttar Pradesh	Kalwa Pawan	
Northern India	Uttar Pradesh	Lalita Masani	
Northern India	Uttar Pradesh	Shyam Baba	
Northern India	Uttar Pradesh	Sabal Singh Bawri	
Northern India	Uttar Pradesh	Kesarmal Bawri	
Northern India	Uttar Pradesh	Nathia Chowki	
Northern India	Uttar Pradesh	Pittar (Ancestors)	
Northern India	Uttar Pradesh	Brahm Baba	
South India	Andhra Pradesh and Telangana	Venkateswara	
South India	Andhra Pradesh and Telangana	Vasavi Kanyaka Parameshvari	
South India	Andhra Pradesh and Telangana	Sri Lakshmi Narasimha	
South India	Andhra Pradesh and Telangana	Sita Ramachandra	
South India	Andhra Pradesh and Telangana	Sri Kalyana Venkateswara	
South India	Andhra Pradesh and Telangana	Kameswari devi	
South India	Andhra Pradesh and Telangana	Chennakeshava	
South India	Andhra Pradesh and Telangana	Mallanna, also known as Khandoba	
South India	Andhra Pradesh and Telangana	Sri Kaleshwara	
South India	Andhra Pradesh and Telangana	Sri Mallikarjuna	
South India	Andhra Pradesh and Telangana	Kanaka Durga	
South India	Andhra Pradesh and Telangana	Rajarajeswari	
South India	Andhra Pradesh and Telangana	Shakambhari	
South India	Andhra Pradesh and Telangana	Nimishamba	
South India	Andhra Pradesh and Telangana	Yellamma	
South India	Andhra Pradesh and Telangana	Peddamma Thalli	
South India	Andhra Pradesh and Telangana	Muthyalamma	
South India	Andhra Pradesh and Telangana	Pochamma	
South India	Andhra Pradesh and Telangana	Patala Lakshmi	
South India	Andhra Pradesh and Telangana	Shakambhari	
South India	Andhra Pradesh and Telangana	Kattalamma	
South India	Karnataka	Chennakeshava	
South India	Karnataka	Virupaksha	
South India	Karnataka	Narasimha	
South India	Karnataka	Shri Katyayani Baneshwar Temple, Aversa	
South India	Karnataka	Renuka	
South India	Karnataka	Kala Bhairaveshwara	
South India	Karnataka	Lakshmi Devi	
South India	Karnataka	Chamundeshwari	
South India	Karnataka	Male Mahadeshwara	
South India	Karnataka	Veerabhadreshwara	
South India	Karnataka	Anjaneya Swamy	
South India	Tulu Nadu	Naga/Naga Bermeru	
South India	Tulu Nadu	Panjurli	
South India	Tulu Nadu	Mahakali	
South India	Tulu Nadu	Lakkesiri	
South India	Tulu Nadu	Jumadi	
South India	Tulu Nadu	Guliga	
South India	Kerala	Padmanabhaswamy	
South India	Kerala	Guruvayurappan	
South India	Kerala	Bhadrakali	
South India	Kerala	Rakteswari	
South India	Kerala	Vettakkorumakan	
South India	Kerala	Narayani	
South India	Kerala	Lakshmi-Narayana	
South India	Kerala	Narasimha	
South India	Kerala	Ganesha	
South India	Kerala	Ayyappan	
South India	Kerala	Navadurga	
South India	Kerala	Damodara	
South India	Kerala	Shasta	
South India	Kerala	Bhuvaneshwari	
South India	Kerala	Krishna	
South India	Kerala	Nagaraja	
South India	Kerala	Vishnumaya	
South India	Malabar	Muthappan	
South India	Malabar	Arya Poomala	
South India	Malabar	Arya Poomaruthan	
South India	Malabar	Wayanattappan	
South India	Malabar	Kathivanoor Veeran	
South India	Malabar	Kudi Veeran	
South India	Malabar	Daivathar Easwaran	
South India	Malabar	Kottiyoorappan	
South India	Malabar	Vishnumurthy	
South India	Malabar	Kodungallur Amma	
South India	Tamil Nadu	Annanmar Thangal	
South India	Tamil Nadu	Azhiya Ilangai Amman	
South India	Tamil Nadu	Shastha	
South India	Tamil Nadu	Kurathiamman	
South India	Tamil Nadu	Ellamman	
South India	Tamil Nadu	Kamakshi	
South India	Tamil Nadu	Angalamman	
South India	Tamil Nadu	Kala Bhairavar	
South India	Tamil Nadu	Narasimha	
South India	Tamil Nadu	Bhadrakali	
South India	Tamil Nadu	Kallalagar	
South India	Tamil Nadu	Mariamman	
South India	Tamil Nadu	Thillai Kali	
South India	Tamil Nadu	Karuppu Sami	
South India	Tamil Nadu	Veeramaathi Amman	
South India	Tamil Nadu	Kodaiyalappan	
South India	Tamil Nadu	Pavadairayan	
South India	Tamil Nadu	Renukamba	
South India	Tamil Nadu	Pachchaiamman	
South India	Tamil Nadu	Draupadi Amman	
South India	Tamil Nadu	Peradachiyamman	
South India	Tamil Nadu	Periyandichiyamman	
South India	Tamil Nadu	Palavesakaran	
South India	Tamil Nadu	Marudhaiyan	
South India	Tamil Nadu	Madurai Veeran	
South India	Tamil Nadu	Muneeshvarar	
South India	Tamil Nadu	Maada saamy	
South India	Tamil Nadu	Thalavai Nalla Maada saamy	
South India	Tamil Nadu	Ayyanar	
South India	Tamil Nadu	Murugan	
South India	Tamil Nadu	Veerabhadrar	
South India	Tamil Nadu	Periandavar	
South India	Tamil Nadu	Sudalaimadan	
South India	Tamil Nadu	Sadaiudayar	
South India	Tamil Nadu	Nondi Veeran	
South India	Tamil Nadu	Kateri Amman	
South India	Tamil Nadu	Sapta Kanni	
South India	Tamil Nadu	Sankara Narayana	
South India	Tamil Nadu	Selliamman / Sellandiamman	
South India	Tamil Nadu	Valampuri Muneeshwarar	
South India	Tamil Nadu	Virumandi	
South India	Tamil Nadu	Pechiyamman	
South India	Tamil Nadu	Maayan	
South India	Tamil Nadu	Kazhuvanaathar	
Western India	Maharashtra	Mahalakshmi of Kolhapur, also locally referred as Ambabai	
Western India	Maharashtra	Vajreshwari	
Western India	Maharashtra	Tulja Bhavani	
Western India	Maharashtra	Virabhadra of Mukhed	
Western India	Maharashtra	Ekvira at Karla	
Western India	Maharashtra	Khandoba of Jejuri	
Western India	Maharashtra	Jyotiba near Kolhapur	
Western India	Maharashtra	Khandoba of Pali	
Western India	Maharashtra	Lakshmi-Narasimha of Nira Narsingpur	
Western India	Maharashtra	Mandhradevi near Wai	
Western India	Maharashtra	Renuka of Mahur	
Western India	Maharashtra	Vasavi Mata	
Western India	Maharashtra	Vyadeshwar	
Western India	Maharashtra	Yamai of Aundh	
Western India	Maharashtra	Yogeshwari of Ambejogai	
Western India	Maharashtra	Saptashrungi of Vani, Nashik	
Western India	Maharashtra	Mahalakshmi of Ganoja, Bhatkuli (Amravati)	
Western India	Maharashtra	Chandrala Parameshwari of Sannati	
Western India	Konkan	Aryadurga	
Western India	Konkan	Bhagavati	
Western India	Konkan	Chamundeshwari	
Western India	Konkan	Damodar	
Western India	Konkan	Devaki-Krishna	
Western India	Konkan	Gajantalakshmi	
Western India	Konkan	Ekvira	
Western India	Konkan	Jaganmata	
Western India	Konkan	Kamakshi	
Western India	Konkan	Mallikarjuna	
Western India	Konkan	Maha Ganapathi Mahammaya	
Western India	Konkan	Mahalakshmi	
Western India	Konkan	Mahalasa	
Western India	Konkan	Mahamaya	
Western India	Konkan	Mahamaya Kalika	
Western India	Konkan	Mangeshi	
Western India	Konkan	Nageshi	
Western India	Konkan	Kali	
Western India	Konkan	Waghjai	
Western India	Konkan	Lakshmi-Narasimha	
Western India	Konkan	Navadurga	
Western India	Konkan	Ramnath	
Western India	Konkan	Ravalnath	
Western India	Konkan	Saptakoteshwar	
Western India	Konkan	Shantadurga	
Western India	Konkan	Sharwani Vetal	
Western India	Konkan	Vijayadurga	
Western India	Konkan	Vimleshwar	
Western India	Konkan	Vetala	
Western India	Konkan	Rameshwar	
Western India	Konkan	Mauli	
Western India	Konkan	Venkataraman	
Western India	Gujarat and Rajasthan	Arasuri Ambaji	
Western India	Gujarat and Rajasthan	Ashapura Mata	
Western India	Gujarat and Rajasthan	Baba Mohan Rama	
Western India	Gujarat and Rajasthan	Baba Ramdevji	
Western India	Gujarat and Rajasthan	Babosa Bhagwan	
Western India	Gujarat and Rajasthan	Badmataji	
Western India	Gujarat and Rajasthan	Suswani Mata	
Western India	Gujarat and Rajasthan	Momai Mata	
Western India	Gujarat and Rajasthan	Bhadrakali	
Western India	Gujarat and Rajasthan	Bhagwati Maa	
Western India	Gujarat and Rajasthan	Handya Bhairuji Maharaj	
Western India	Gujarat and Rajasthan	Bhatiji Maharaj	
Western India	Gujarat and Rajasthan	Brahmani Mata	
Western India	Gujarat and Rajasthan	Chamunda Mata	
Western India	Gujarat and Rajasthan	Dada Jasraj	
Western India	Gujarat and Rajasthan	Eklingji	
Western India	Gujarat and Rajasthan	Devnarayan	
Western India	Gujarat and Rajasthan	Gajanan Mata	
Western India	Gujarat and Rajasthan	Gogaji	
Western India	Gujarat and Rajasthan	Vitthalanatha	
Western India	Gujarat and Rajasthan	Harkor	
Western India	Gujarat and Rajasthan	Harsidhhi Mata	
Western India	Gujarat and Rajasthan	Hinglaj Mata	
Western India	Gujarat and Rajasthan	Jeen Mata	
Western India	Gujarat and Rajasthan	Kaila Devi	
Western India	Gujarat and Rajasthan	Mahakali Mata	
Western India	Gujarat and Rajasthan	Mahalakshmi Mata	
Western India	Gujarat and Rajasthan	Manasa Devi	
Western India	Gujarat and Rajasthan	Meldi Maa	
Western India	Gujarat and Rajasthan	Modheswari	
Western India	Gujarat and Rajasthan	Nagnechiya Maa	
Western India	Gujarat and Rajasthan	Pabuji	
Western India	Gujarat and Rajasthan	Rana Jashraj	
Western India	Gujarat and Rajasthan	Sachiya Mata	
Western India	Gujarat and Rajasthan	Sati Mata	
Western India	Gujarat and Rajasthan	Siriyal Mata (Savla)	
Western India	Gujarat and Rajasthan	Swaminarayan	
Western India	Gujarat and Rajasthan	Tanot Mata	
Western India	Gujarat and Rajasthan	Tulja Bhavani	
Western India	Gujarat and Rajasthan	Vachra Dada	
Western India	Gujarat and Rajasthan	Varahi Mata	
Western India	Gujarat and Rajasthan	Veer Teja	
Western India	Gujarat and Rajasthan	Vindhya	
Western India	Gujarat and Rajasthan	Umiya Mata	
East India	Bihar	Braham Baba	
East India	Bihar	Dharmaraj	
East India	Bihar	Saat bahini Mata	
East India	Bihar	Hanuman ji	
East India	Bihar	Bhairav ji	
East India	Bihar	Sokha baba	
East India	Bihar	Bandi Devi	
East India	Bihar	Banni Mata	
East India	Bihar	Sati Mata	
East India	Bihar	Parmeshwari Mata	
East India	Bihar	Durga Mata	
East India	Bihar	Kali Mata	
East India	Bihar	Lakshmi Mata	
East India	Bihar	Sarswati Mata	
East India	Bihar	Shitala Mata	
East India	Bihar	Phulmati Mata	
East India	Bihar	Kumari Mata	
East India	Bihar	Gahil Mata	
East India	Bihar	Kamla Mata	
East India	Bihar	Chandika Mata	
East India	Bihar	Vindhyavashni Mata	
East India	Bihar	Maha Maya Mata	
East India	Bihar	Narsingh baba	
East India	Bihar	Shiv ji	
East India	Bihar	Gauraiya Baba	
East India	Bihar	Karikh baba	
East India	Bihar	Feku baba	
East India	Bihar	Bhuiya baba	
East India	Bihar	Chauharmal baba	
East India	Bihar	Sahlaish baba	
East India	Bengal	Kali	
East India	Bengal	Durga	
East India	Bengal	Shiva	
East India	Bengal	Parvati	
East India	Bengal	Jagadhatri	
East India	Bengal	Narayana	
East India	Bengal	Krishna	
East India	Bengal	Lakshmi-Narayana	
East India	Bengal	Shitala	
East India	Bengal	Chandi	
East India	Bengal	Manasa	
East India	Bengal	Gandheswari	
Sri Lanka		Nayinai Nagapoosani	
Sri Lanka		Nallur Murugan	
Sri Lanka		Keerimalai Naguleswaram Temple	
Sri Lanka		Thirukketheeswaram	
Sri Lanka		Thirukonamalai KonEesar Temple	
