= Dugar =

Gotra of the Jain Oswal community, Rajasthan

The Dugar (also called Duggar, Duggad, Dugad) is a gotra (lineage) of the Oswal community of Jains of Rajasthan.

== Origin and lineage ==
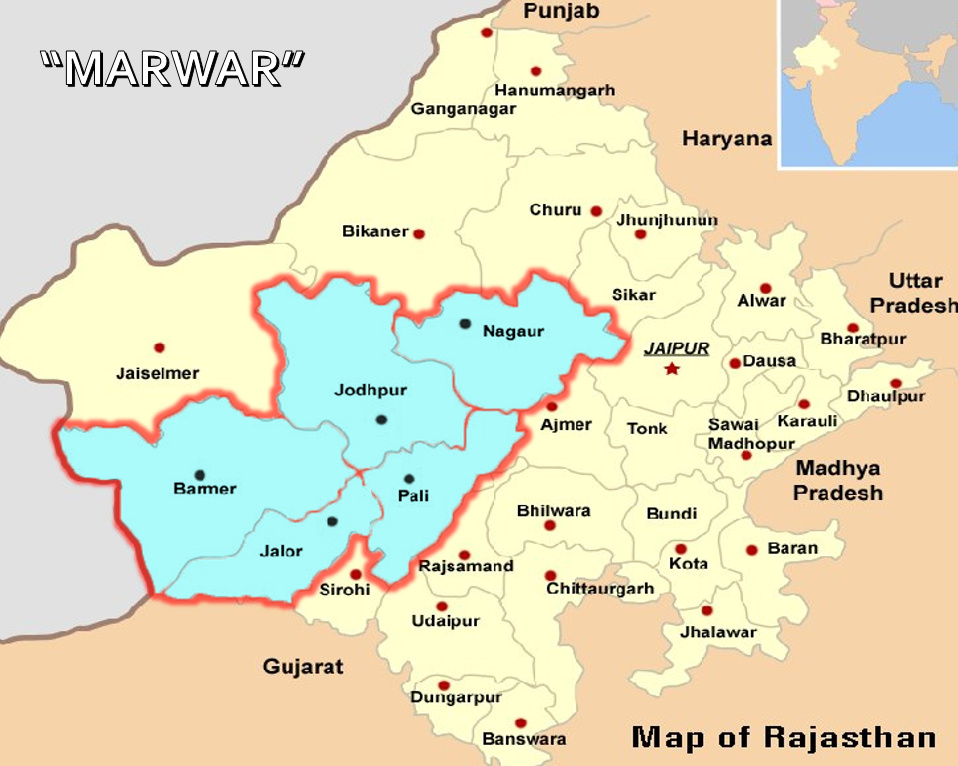
Marwar in 1140 A.D.

According to Mahajan Vansh Muktavali by Yati Ramlal ji,

The King of Marwar, Rao Surdeo Khich was a brave Rajput King . He had two sons, named Dugar and Sugad.The Origin of Rao Surdeo Khich (and Dugar and Sugad of course) was from Chauhan King of Bisalpur (Neighbouring Gulabpura & Bijaynagar, Between Ajmer & Bhilwara) . Both the brothers established a new city Aghat in Mewar.Around Aghat there were colonies of Bheels and Meenas (criminal tribes).Once the criminal tribes surrounded the Aghat City and started killing the innocent people, both the brothers arrested and punished them. When the Rawal of Chittorgarh Rana Berisal Singh Sisodia heard that Dugar and Sugad had arrested such notorious criminals; he became pleased and called them to his palace and honoured them with the title of Shri Raoraja.

There was an old temple of Naharsingh Devta outside the boundary of Aghat City. The people of Aghat destroyed the temple so Devta became angry, and began to create nuisance and violence in the city and started torturing and killing the women and children. Both of the Raorajas Dugar and Sugad tried a lot but failed to stop him.

Then coincidentally, Manidhari Acharya Shri Jinchandra Suri came to Aghat city and were notified about the nuisance created by Dave. Acharya Shri prayed to Padmavati Devi and asked her to come and help them. Padmavati Devi appeared and caught Naharsingh Dave and ordered him to not create trouble anymore.

By seeing this miracle, both the brothers adopted Jainism. Manidhari Acharya Shri Jinchandra Suri made them Oswals in V.S. 1217 (Around 1160 A.D.) and their gotras were named Dugar and Sugad.

Chittorgarh Nawab Berisal Singh Sisodia was so impressed by this incident that he also became Oswal and adopted Jainism. His gotra was named Sisodia. His Deewaan Khetani also became Oswal, so his family was named Khetani.

However, according to the historian Dr J.P.Krishnanthan, Acharya Shri Shidchandra Suri arranged a sangh to Shatrunjaya, where 1,700 people converted to Jainism. Both Dugar and Sugad were also impressed by words of Acharya Shri Shidchandra Suri and they also converted to Jainism under him.

The book Oswal Jati Ka Ithias by Sukhsampatraj Bhandari traces the lineage of Dugars to the Chauhan Dynasty of Bilaspur.

== Kuldevi ==
Ambe incarnated as Suswani Mata and was born to Sri Seth Satidasji and Srimati Sugankanwarji of Nagaur in V.S. 1219. Her marriage was fixed at the age of 10 in the Dugar family. She was very beautiful. On the day of her pre-marital function, the nawab of Nagaur was allured by her beauty and fell in love with her. He expressed his wish to marry 'Suswani' in front of her father, but her father said that the girl was an incarnation of the Mata Ambe and it was not in his power to bestow her on any body. As marital relationship between Jain and Muslim was not possible her father rejected the proposal. The nawab got furious and threatened to kill the whole family and imprisoned Seth Satidas . The entire family blamed Suswani ji for the whole incident. Suswani ji became upset and started praying to Arihant and felt asleep.

In her sleep she saw a dream of an enlightened idol assuring her not to worry. The idol told Suswani ji to inform the nawab that she would marry him, if he fulfills the condition laid down by her. The condition was that,"She would be at a distance of 7 feet from him and he should catch her by following her either barefooted or on a horse.However he will never be able to catch her."

"नैन मूंद अरिहन्त को ध्यायी। ध्यान ही ध्यान में निन्दिया आई। स्वप्न में तेजस्वी भगवान ने दर्शन देकर कहा वचन में।। घबराने की बात नहीं है उसकी ये औकात नहीं है।। तू उस दुष्ट को ये कहलादे शर्त रखी है तेरे आगे।। सात पांवड़े की छूट देकर पीछा कर ले घोड़े चढ़कर।। वो तुझको नहीं पकड़ पायेगा दौड़-दौड़ कर थक जायेगा।। "

– Suswani Mata Ki Gatha

The proof of this dream would be the saffron tilak on the forehead of her family members, in the morning and the idol disappeared. Suswani woke up and narrated the entire dream to her mother and found the saffron tilak on the forehead of the family members.

All the members were pacified and thereafter the message was sent to the nawab. The nawab agreed to her terms and was extremely happy. Sethji was freed from the prison. Very soon nawab with a few soldiers arrived at Sethji's palace. Suswani ji left the imprints of the kumkum hand on the wall near the front door of the house, before starting to run. As per the condition, she started running on foot, and the evil nawab on the horse leaving a gap of 7 feet in between them. The nawab was unable to catch her, although he was on a horse and the distance remained the same. She kept on running and when she got tired, she prayed for help. Immediately a lion appeared on which she mounted and continued running up to the present Bikaner district's Morkhana village. There she saw a shrine of Shiva and prayed for help. Shiva appeared in front of her and threw a chimta in front of the temple, amidst a Kera tree . As soon as Suswani reached the place, the Kera tree and the earth parted in two making a thunderous sound. Suswani ji entered into the earth with the lion and the earth closed up again, leaving a small part of her saree out . The Nawab and his friends fought for the pallu and killed each other. The divine shrine of Morkhana still witness the fully bloomed Kera tree.

In V.S. 1232, Malhadas Surana, the younger brother of Seth Satidas Surana, saw a dream in which Suswani ji in the form of Devi, ordered him to construct a temple at the place where she entered into the earth. He expressed his inability due to lack of money. Devi told him about a place with hidden treasure in his goshala. Malhadas constructed the temple, a well and a Goshala with the help of that money. When Malahdas Surana expressed the lack of money to construct the temple, Devi told him about a place with hidden treasure in his Goshala. Malahdas constructed a temple of Suswani Mataji with the help of that money.

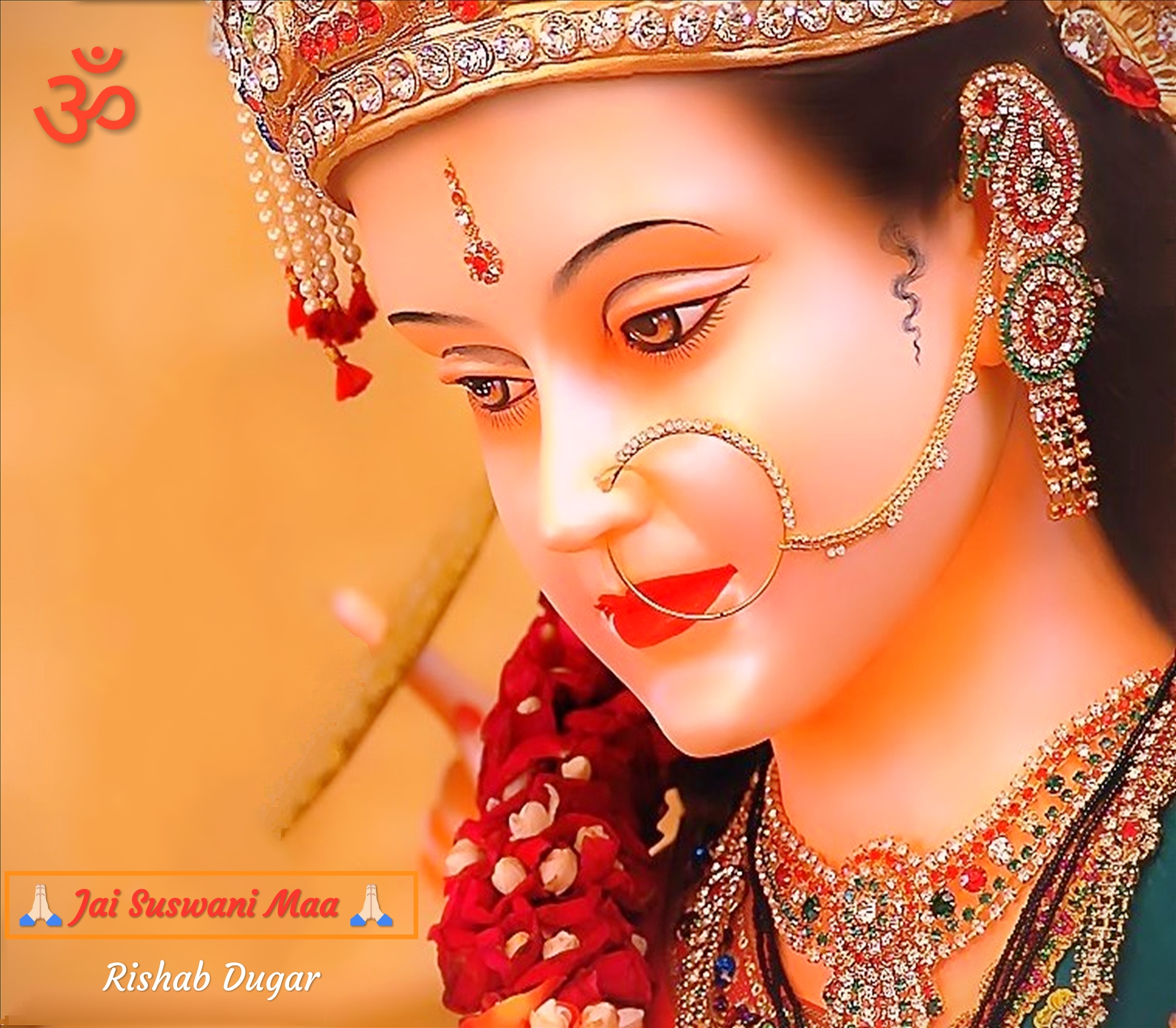
Maa Suswani, incarnation of Ambe Maa or Maa Adishakti

Since then Suswani Mataji is the Kuldevi of Dugar as well as Surana and Sankhala Gotras. Her temple is situated at Morkhana, in Bikaner District, India.

The four categories of Dugar's under Shwetamber sect are Sthanakwasi, Terapanthi, Sheharwali and Murtipujak.

== See also ==
- Acharya Bhikshu
- Jainism
- Morkhana
- Oswal
- Sardarshahar
- Terapanth
