= Gandhabanik =

Bengali Hindu trading caste

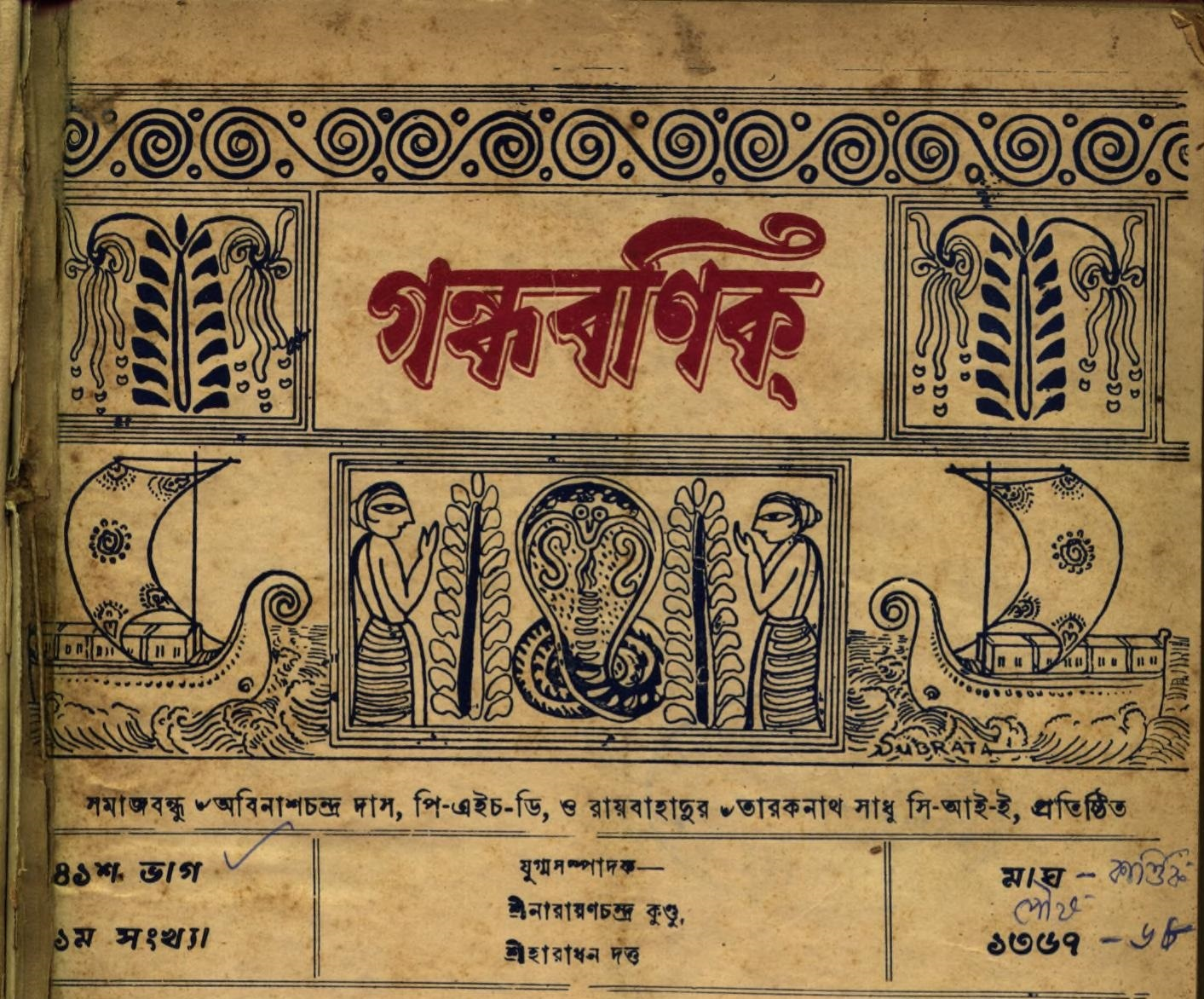
- Cover of Gandhabanik magazine, Issue-1, 1367
- Kuladevi (female): Gandheswari mata
- Religions: Hinduism
- Languages: Bengali
- Populated states: West Bengal, Jharkhand, Tripura, Assam

Gandhabanik (Bengali: গন্ধবণিক) is a Bengali Hindu trading caste, who as the caste name suggests, traditionally used to trade in perfumes, cosmetics, spices etc. They were also engaged in agriculture. As of late nineteenth century they were one of the fourteen castes belonging to Nabasakh group.

It is believed that the legendary sea merchant Chand Sadagar of ancient Champaknagar was from Gandhabanik community.

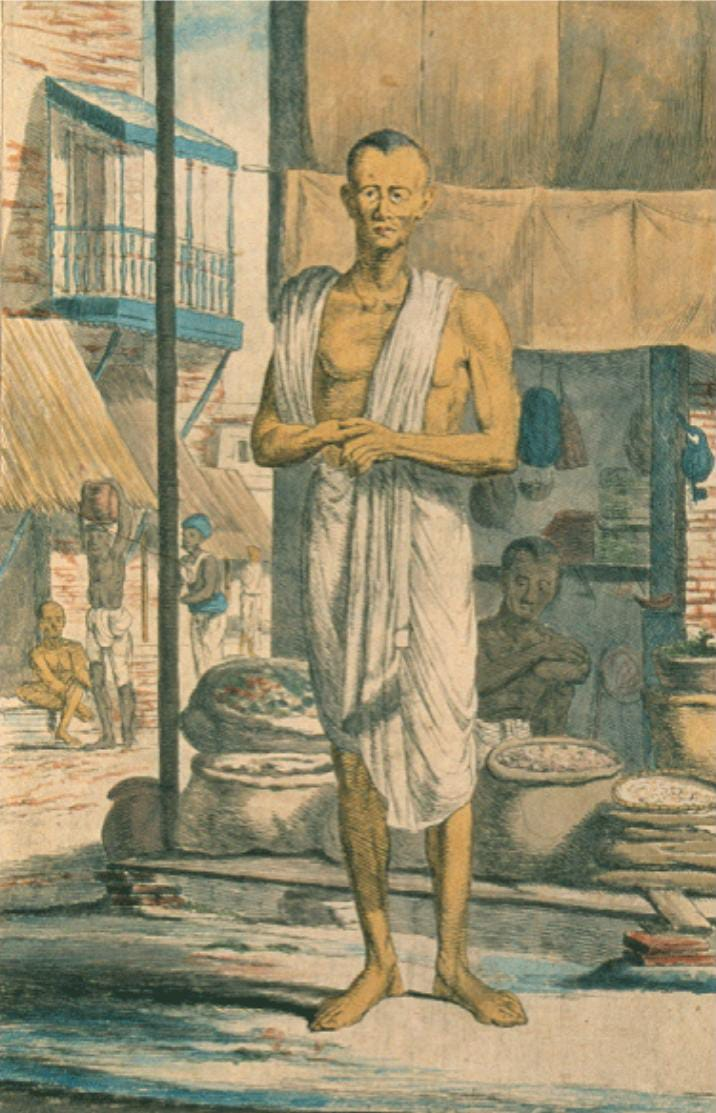
Gandhabanik grocer, from a 1799 collection of etchings

== Varna Status ==
Gandhabaniks have generally been considered as 'middle class shudras' in the caste structure of Bengal.
