= Nagnechiya Mata =

Kuldevi Of Rathore's

Nagnechiya Maa
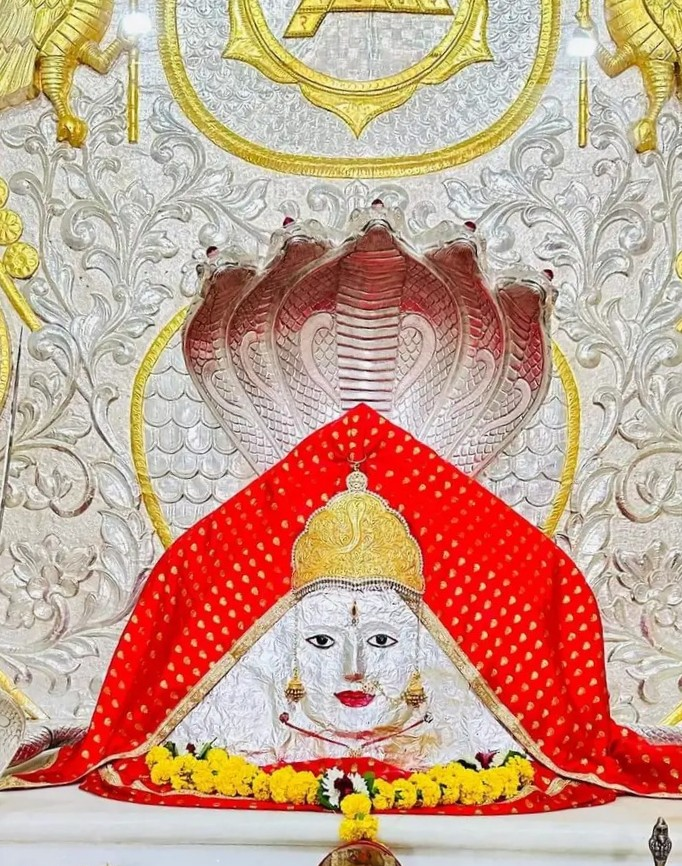
- Murti of the deity at Nagana Temple
- Affiliation: Adi Shakti, Radha, Mahalakshmi
- Abode: Nagana, Rajasthan, India
- Adherents: Rathore dynasty
- Region: Rajasthan, India
- Temple: Temple at Nagana

Nagnechiya Mata or Naganechi Mata (also known as Chakreshwari) is an aspect of Devi, a Hindu goddess. She is the Kuldevi of the Rathore Rajputs of the Kingdom of Marwar, Bikaner state and her main temple is located in the village of Nagana, near Jodhpur in Rajasthan.

== Name ==
Before being known as Naganechi, the goddess was revered as Chakreshwari. Historical texts like the 'Moondiyad Ri Khyat' and 'Udaybhan Champawat Ri Khyat' describe how Rao Dhuhad brought the statue of Chakreshwari from Kannauj and established it in Nagana. The goddess's name evolved from 'Nagana', the village where she was established, with the suffix 'chi' signifying 'of Nagana'. Thus, Naganechi means 'of Nagana', cementing her as the guardian deity of the Rathores.

== History ==
Rao Dhoohad, son of Rao Asthan and grandson of Rao Siha—the founder of the Kingdom of Marwar—brought the idol of Chakreshwari Mata from his ancestral homeland of Kannauj between 1295 and 1305. He installed the sculpture in the town of Nagana, where a grand temple now stands in her honor.

Naganechi, depicted with eighteen arms, embodies the form of Mahishasuramardini. The falcon or eagle is her symbol, which can be seen on the flags of the princely states of Marwar (Jodhpur), Bikaner, and Kishangarh.

== Other related temples ==
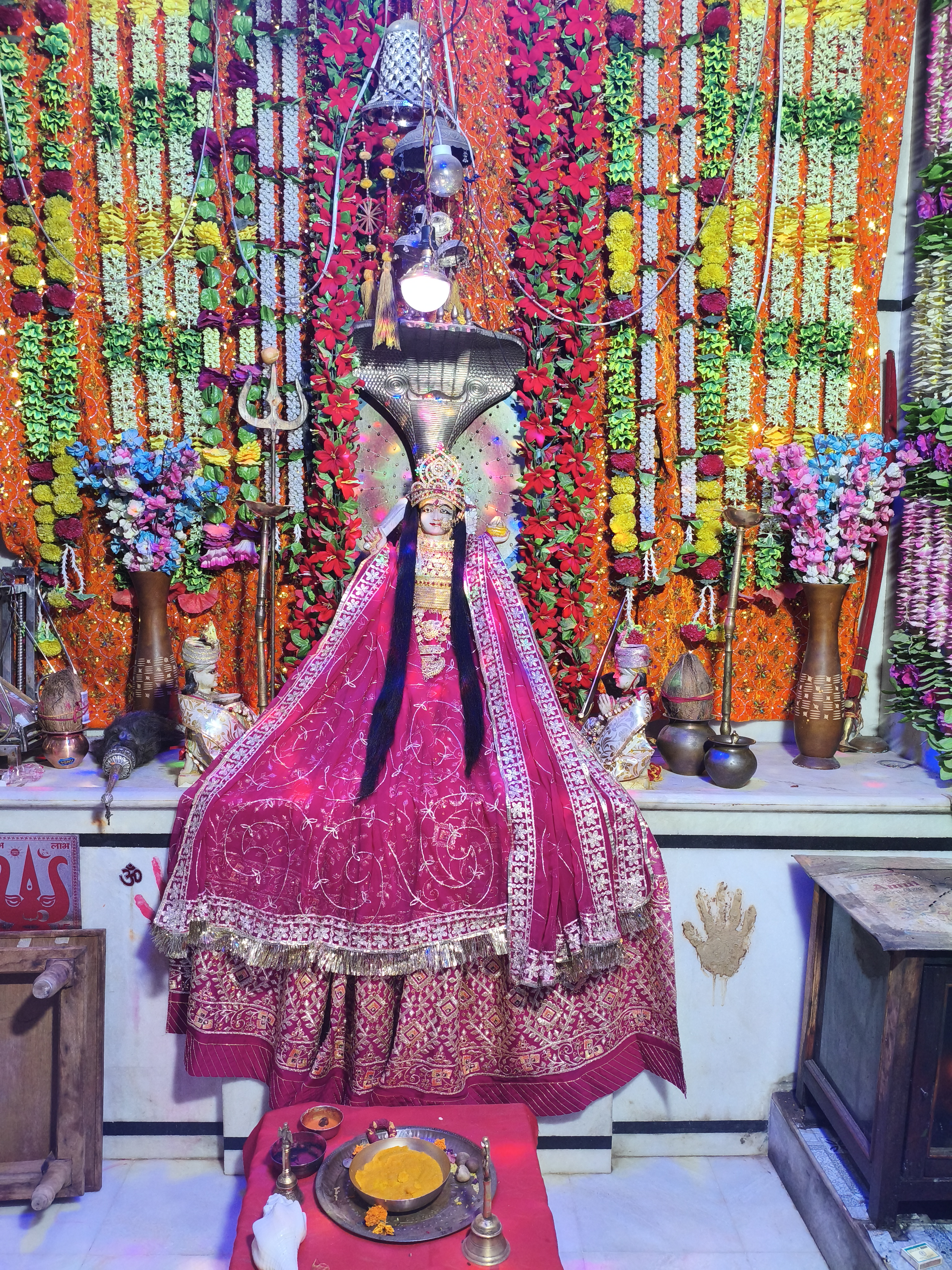
Nagnechi Mata Temple Nalgudha.

Nagnechi Mata Temple (also known as Nagnechya Mataji Temple) is a revered spiritual site primarily located in Nalgudha.
