= Nagana =

Nagana can refer to:

- Animal trypanosomiasis, or sleeping sickness, a disease of non-human vertebrates
- Nagana, Balotra, a village in Rajastan, India
- Nagana (1933 film), an American film directed by Ernst L. Frank
- Nagana (1955 film), a French-Italian film directed by Hervé Bromberger

== See also ==
- Nagan (disambiguation)
