= Ekvira =

Hindu goddess

- एकविरा आई
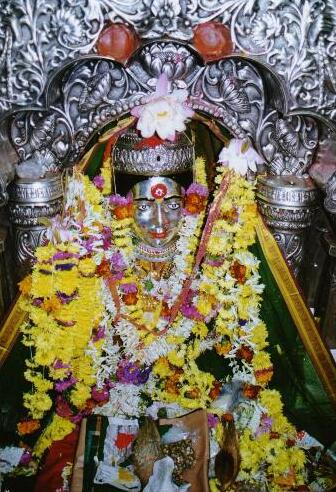
- Idol of the goddess

- Location in Maharashtra

Religion
- Affiliation: Hinduism
- District: Pune
- Deity: Ekvira Devi
- Festivals: Navaratri, Chytra Palkhi Festival (March, April)

Location
- Location: Karla Caves
- State: Maharashtra
- Country: India
- Coordinates: 18°47′00″N 73°28′14″E

Architecture
- Creator: People of Koli ethnic group

Ekvira (also spelled as Ekveera) is a Hindu goddess, regarded to be a form of the goddess Parvati, Yamai and Renuka devi. She is the Kuladevi of the Koli community and is also worshipped by Chandraseniya Kayastha Prabhu community. Every year Kolis pay respect to Ekvira and celebrate the festival in Karla Caves. Ekvira Aai is traditionally worshipped by the Aagri community as well.

== Temple ==
The Ekvira Aai Mandir is a Hindu temple located near the Karla Caves near Lonavala in Maharashtra, India. Here, the worship of the goddess Ekvira is carried on right next to the caves, once a center of Buddhism. The temple is a prime spot of worship for the Aagri and Koli people. The temple-complex originally consisted of three similar shrines built in a row all facing west. Of these, the central and the southern shrines are preserved in full, and the rest of the structures are preserved only on plan. The maha-mandapa, varsha-mandapa and gopura are situated in front of these three shrines and these three shrines are surrounded by sixteen shrines of additional parivara devatas. The devotees throng the temple on all occasions of Navaratri and Chaitra Navratra to worship and celebrate. It is believed that the goddess has magical powers.

The temple is on a hill. One needs to ascend around 500 steps to reach the temple. It is surrounded by the Karla caves, which are now protected by the Archeological department. While the main deity is Ekvira, she is accompanied by a murti of Jogeśvarī Devi. Ekvira is a Hindu goddess, regarded to be a form of the goddess Renuka. She is the kuladevi of the Koli people.

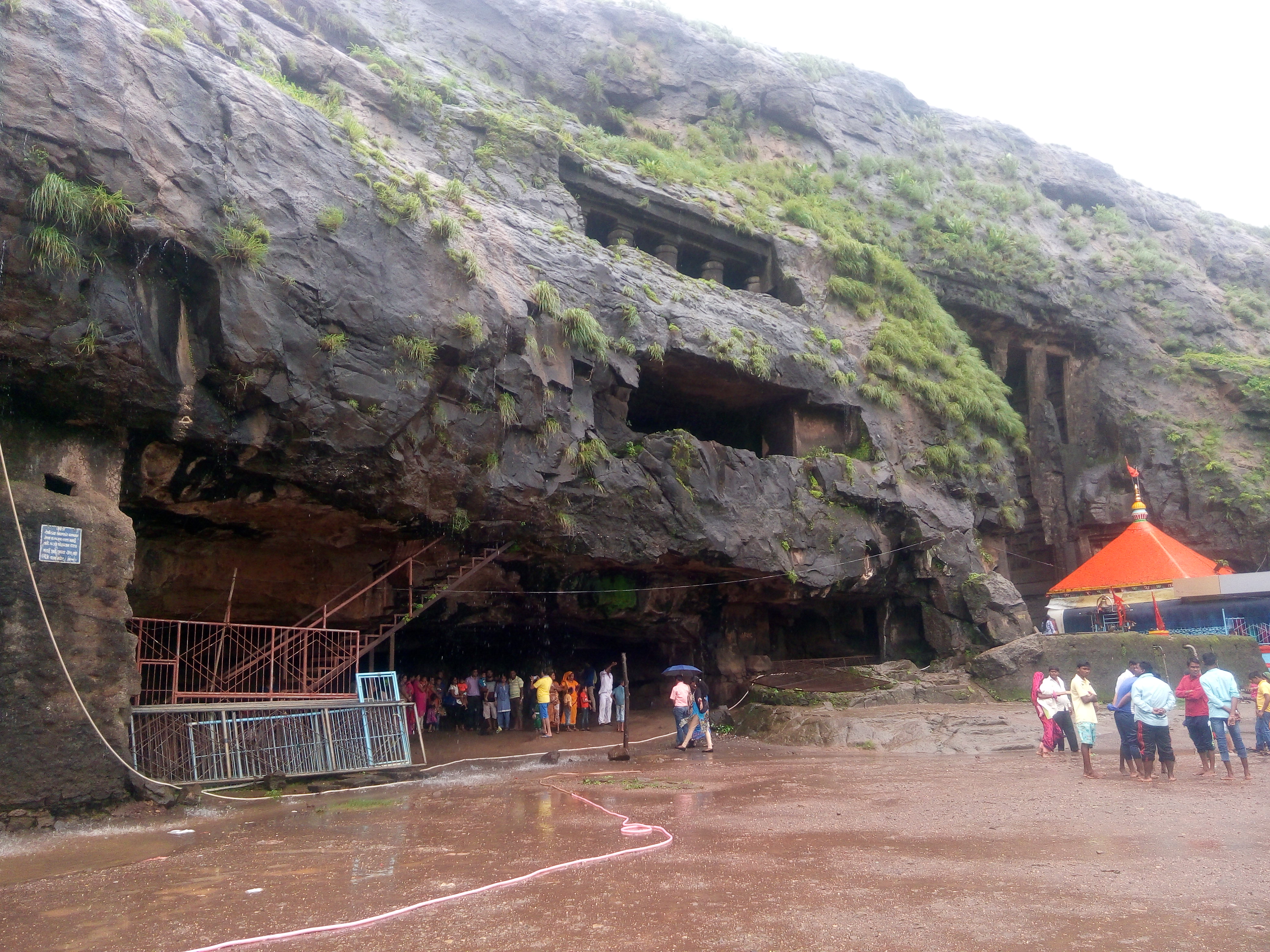
Goddess Ekvira Temple and Karla Caves
