= Suswani Mataji =

Kuldevi of Dugar and Surana gotras

Suswani Mata
- Incarnation of Durga
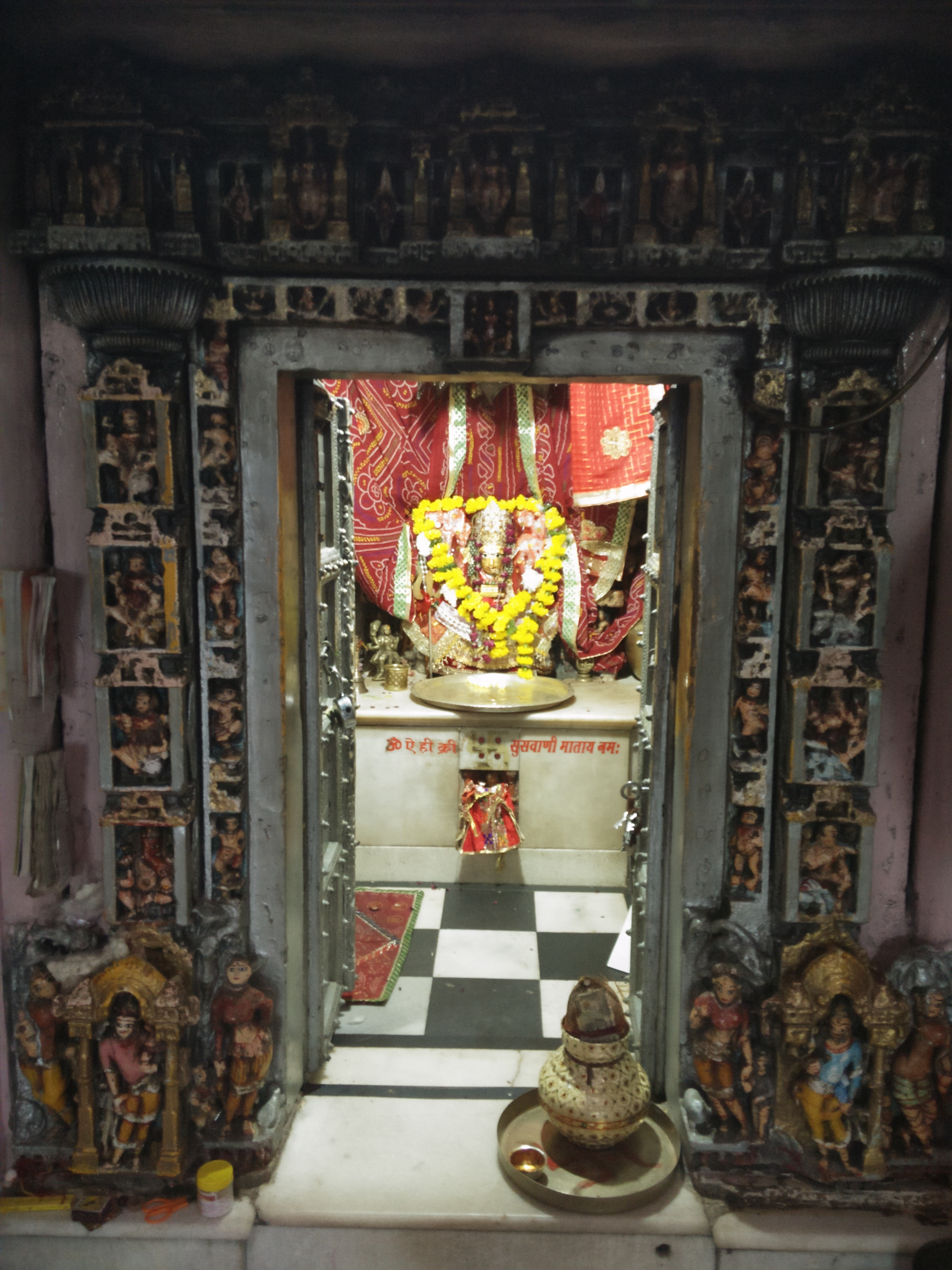
- Suswani Mataji Idol at Morkhana
- Devanagari: सुसवाणी मां
- Affiliation: Kuldevi of 9 major gotras of Oswal Mahajans including Dugar, Surana, Chandaliya and Sankhlas
- Weapon: Trident
- Mount: Lion
- Festivals: Navratri

Genealogy
- Born: Nagaur
- Parents: Shri Seth Satidas Ji Surana (father); Shrimati Sugankanwarji (mother)

Suswani Mataji also known as Susani Mata or Susvani Mata is a regional Hindu as well Jain goddess, popular in Rajasthan state of India. She is regarded as incarnation of Durga and worshipped by many Jain and Hindu communities.

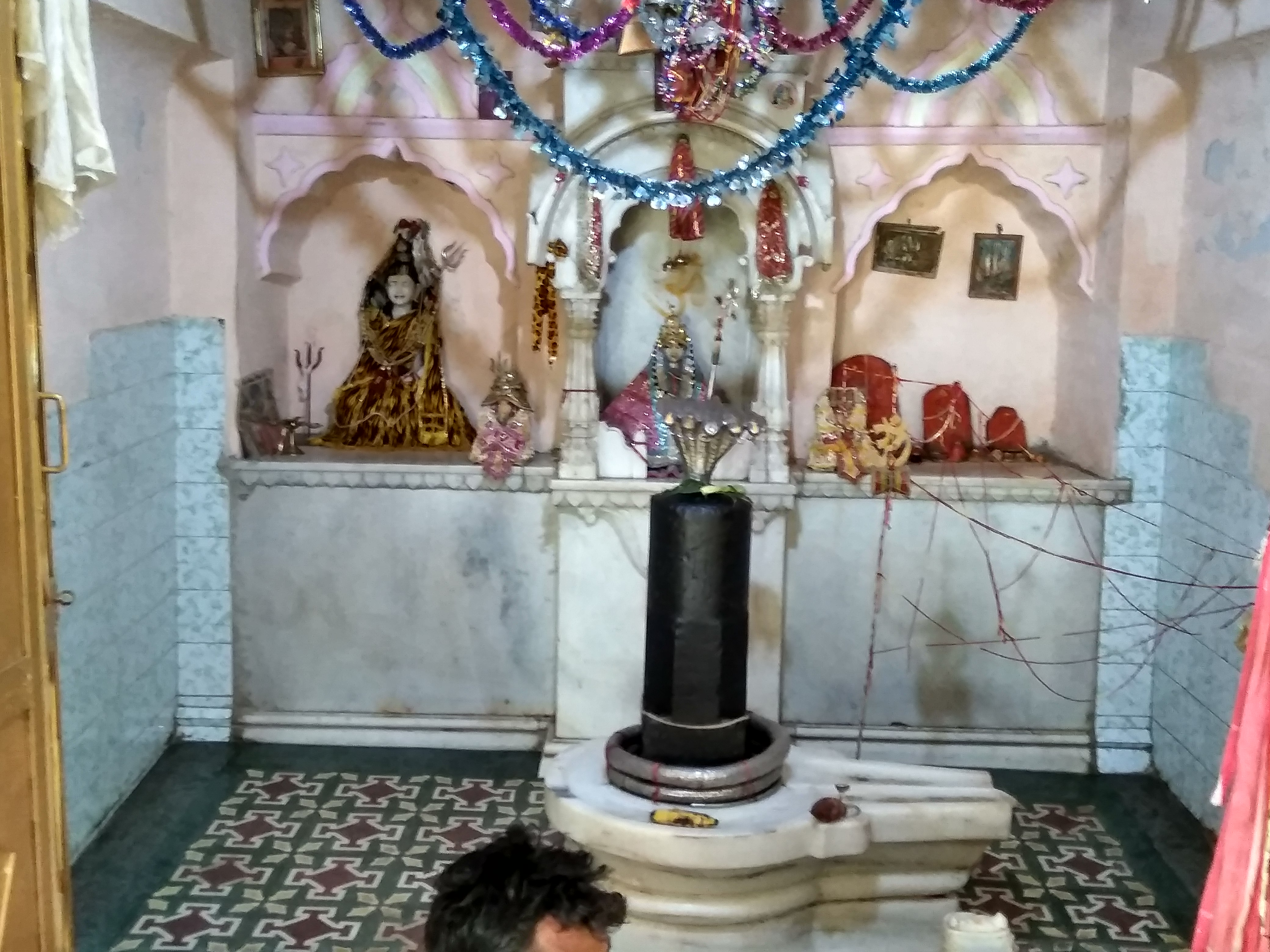
Lord Shiva's Ancient Shrine near Suswani Mataji Temple, Morkhana where Shiva appeared to help Suswani Mataji

== Temple ==
Her main temple is located at Morkhana in Bikaner district of Rajasthan. The temple is one of the oldest in the region dating back to 12th century AD as per inscription built in Vikram Samvant 1229 (year 1173–74 AD), as per Archaeological Survey of India reports. The premises also covers a kaira tree which is a part of the legend where the Suswani entered the earth riding on the lion. There is an old Shiva Temple located nearby as mentioned in the legend from where Shiva is believed to have thrown the chimta which fell in between the existing Kaira tree splitting it into two along with the earth. Further, another inscription notes that temple was repaired in Vikram Samvant 1573 (year 1518 AD) by Surana Hema Raja. She is worshipped as a Kuldevi of many Jain clans like Surana, Dugar, Chandaliya and Sankhla sub-clans of Rajasthani Jain community. The temple is considered important both by Jains, Hindus and Shakta religion.

== Details ==
The Suswani Devi temple, dedicated to the Suswani at Morkhana is around 846 years old. It is constructed out of Jaisalmer stones where statues of demigods are carved on the outer walls.

The entrance of the temple is under excavation and a lower wall is built around the basement. The terrace of the temple is supported by 16 pillars, of which 12 are around the main temple, while the remaining 4 support its center. The left most pillars are carved in Sridhara style. Two inscriptions are engraved on the right-hand column in front of the basement, dated around 1172 AD that display the shape of a woman carved on the upper part.

An old shrine of Shiva is located nearby. The Shiva Lingam is believed to be around 5000 years old although the existing temple was enlarged recently. It was from this place that Shiva threw his chimta towards the famous Kera Tree splitting it into two halves along with the land. It is believed that Suswani Mata entered into the Earth along with her lion and the Earth closed up again. The Kera tree still stands there lush and green since the above-mentioned incident which took place at AD 1173 according to the deciphered inscription of the main temple.

== Legend ==
Goddess Ambe incarnated as Suswani Mata and was born to Sri Seth Satidasji and Srimati Sugankanwarji of Nagaur in V.S. 1219. Her marriage was fixed at the age of 10 in the Dugar family. She was very beautiful. On the day of her pre-marital function, the nawab of Nagaur was allured by her beauty and fell in love with her. He expressed his wish to marry 'Suswani' in front of her father, but her father said that the girl was an incarnation of the Mata Ambe and it was not in his power to bestow her on any body. As marital relationship between Hindu and Muslim was not possible her father rejected the proposal. The nawab got furious and threatened to kill the whole family and imprisoned Seth Satidas. The entire family blamed Suswani for the whole incident. Suswani became upset and started praying to Arihant and felt asleep.

In her sleep she saw a dream of an enlightened idol assuring her not to worry. The idol told Suswani to inform the nawab that she would marry him, if he fulfills the condition laid down by her. The condition was that, "She would be at a distance of 7 feet from him and he should catch her by following her either barefooted or on a horse. However the idol assured her that he will never be able to catch her."

"नैन मूंद अरिहन्त को ध्यायी। ध्यान ही ध्यान में निन्दिया आई। स्वप्न में तेजस्वी भगवान ने दर्शन देकर कहा वचन में।। घबराने की बात नहीं है उसकी ये औकात नहीं है।। तू उस दुष्ट को ये कहलादे शर्त रखी है तेरे आगे।। सात पांवड़े की छूट देकर पीछा कर ले घोड़े चढ़कर।। वो तुझको नहीं पकड़ पायेगा दौड़-दौड़ कर थक जायेगा।। "

- Suswani Mata Ki Gatha

The proof of this dream would be the saffron tilak on the forehead of her family members, in the morning and the idol disappeared. Suswani woke up and narrated the entire dream to her mother and found the saffron tilak on the forehead of the family members.

All the members were pacified and thereafter the message was sent to the nawab. The nawab agreed to her terms and was extremely happy. Sethji was freed from the prison. Very soon nawab with a few soldiers arrived at Sethji's palace. Suswani left the imprints of the kumkum hand on the wall near the front door of the house, before starting to run. As per the condition, she started running on foot, and the evil nawab on the horse leaving a gap of 7 feet in between them.

. The nawab was unable to catch her, although he was on a horse and the distance remained the same. She kept on running and when she got tired, she prayed for help. Immediately a lion appeared on which she mounted and continued running up to the present Bikaner district's Morkhana village. There she saw a shrine of Shiva and prayed for help. Shiva appeared in front of her and threw a chimta in front of the temple, amidst a Kera tree. As soon as Suswani reached the place, the Kera tree and the earth parted in two making a thunderous sound. Suswani entered into the earth with the lion and the earth closed up again, leaving a small part of her saree out. The Nawab and his friends fought for the pallu and killed each other. The divine shrine of Morkhana still witness the fully bloomed Kera tree.

In V.S. 1232, Malhadas Surana, the younger brother of Seth Satidas Surana, saw a dream in which Suswani in the form of Devi, ordered him to construct a temple at the place where she entered into the earth. He expressed his inability due to lack of money. Devi told him about a place with hidden treasure in his goshala. Malhadas constructed the temple, a well and a Goshala with the help of that money.

== Prominent Temples ==
Apart from Chief temple at Morkhana, her major temples are located at Nagaur(Rajasthan), Jodhpur (Rajasthan), Rajarhat (West Bengal), Viluppuram (Tamil Nadu), Attibele (Karnataka), Andarsul (Maharashtra), Kanwaliyas (Rajasthan).

== Photo gallery ==
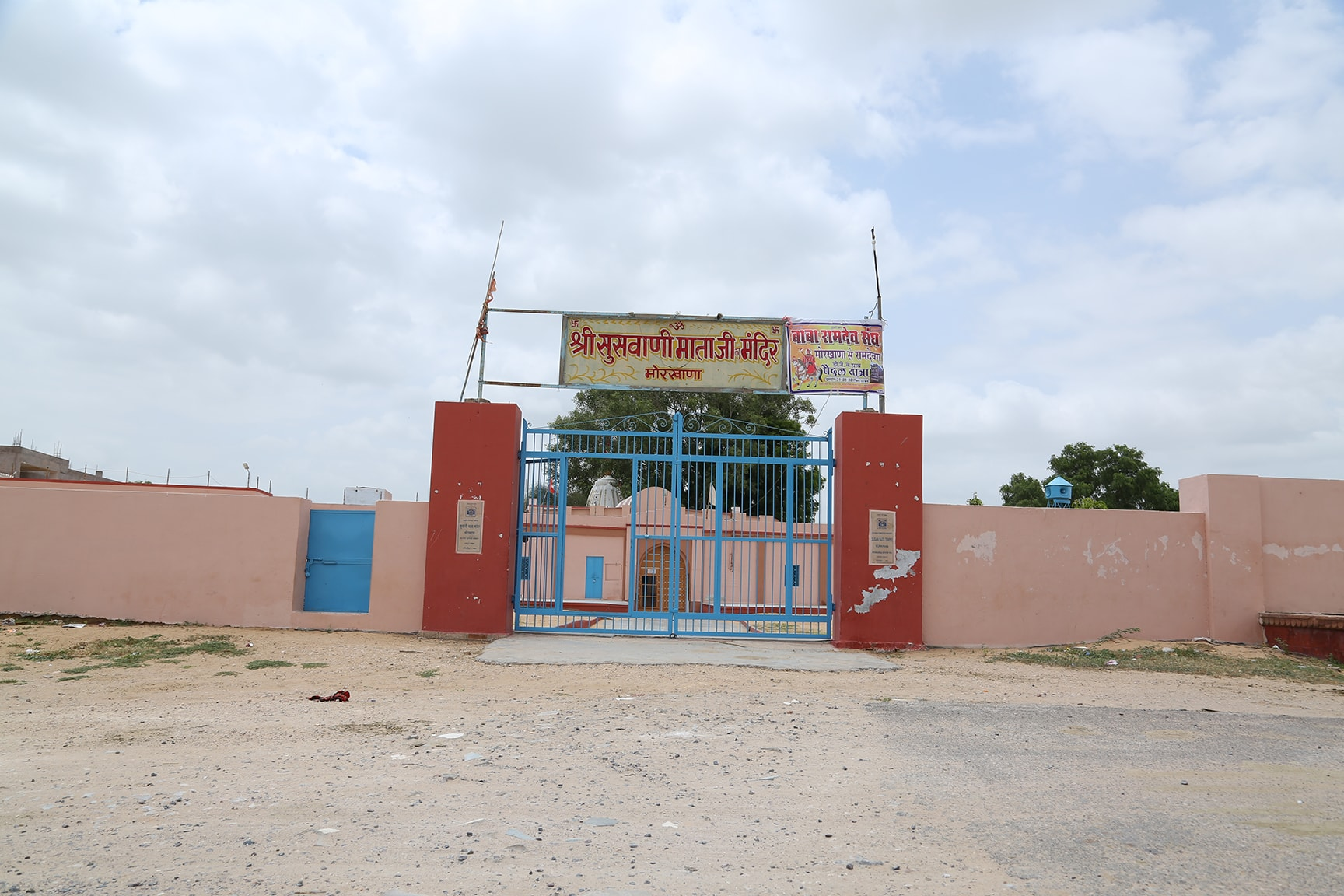
Entrance gate Suswani Devi temple, Morkhana.

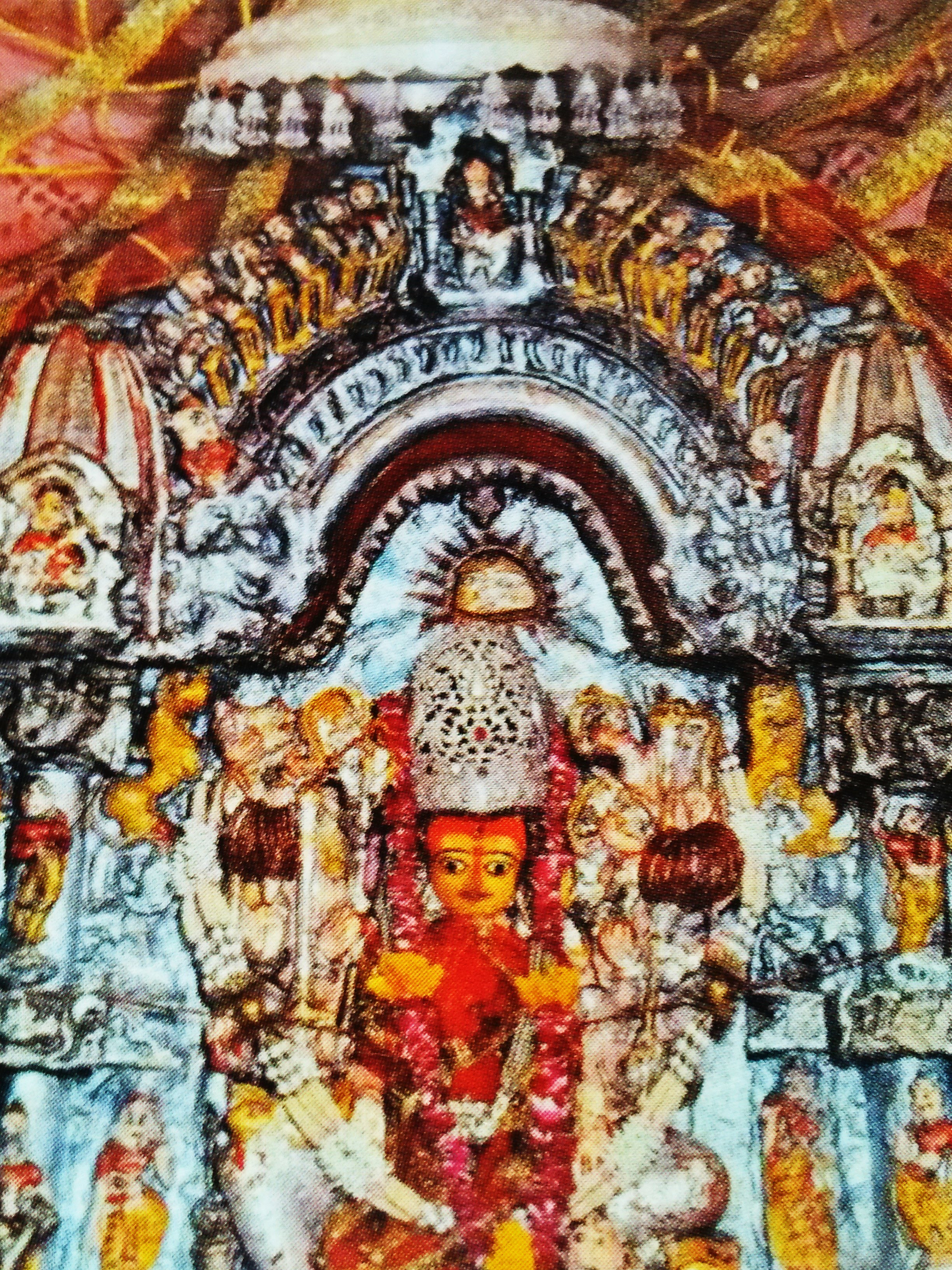
Close up darshan of Suswani Devi idol, Morkhana.

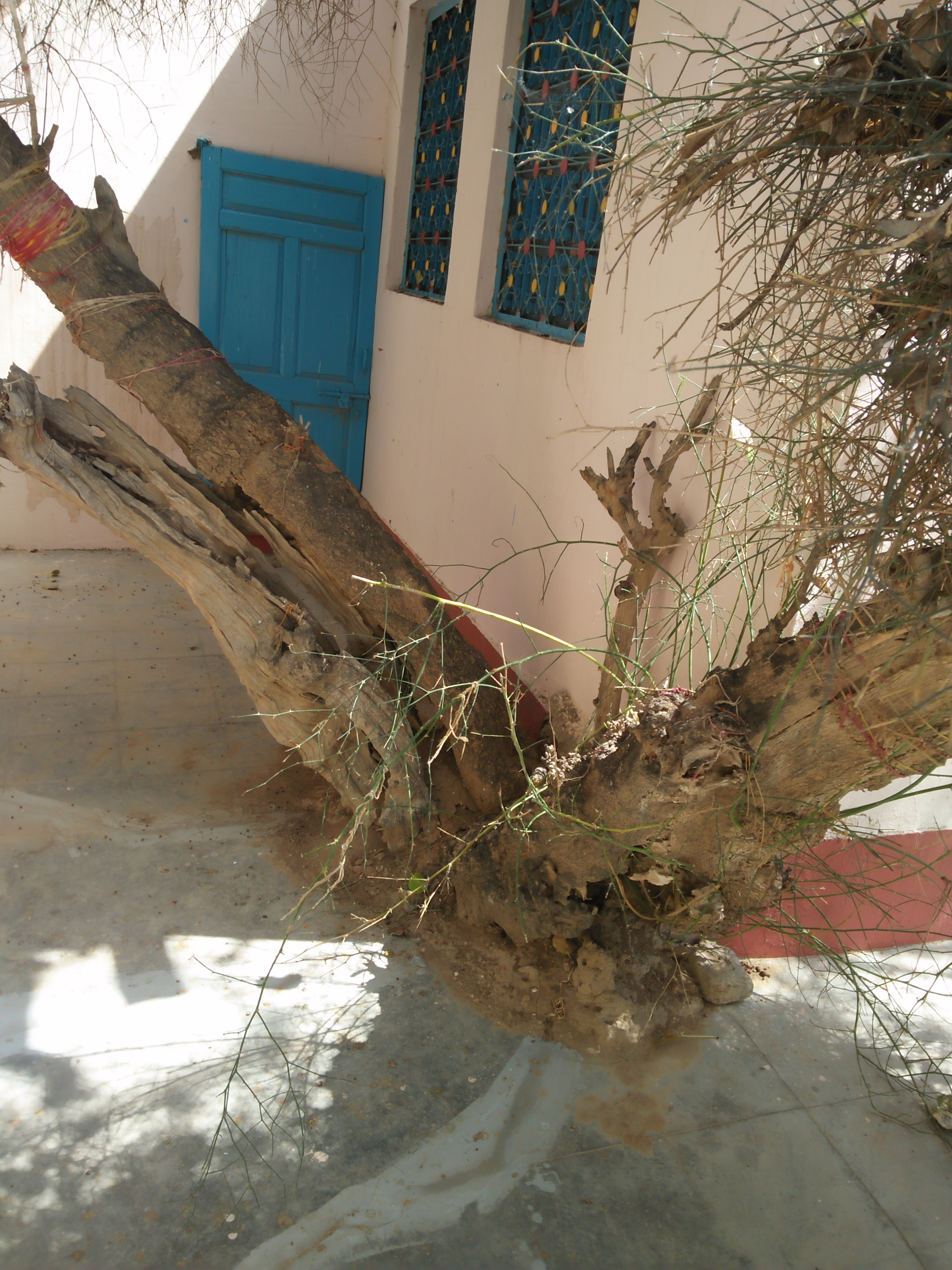
Kera tree split in two as per legend by Chimta of Lord Shiva, where-in earth opened to take Lion riding Suswani Mata into herself.

== Website ==
Shri Suswani Mataji Morkhana Trust, Bikaner

== Important Links ==
Shri Suswani Mataji Temples in India

Shri Suswani Mataji Bhajans

Shri Suswani Mataji Bhajan Playlist
