= Bhathiji =

Hindu deity

Bhathiji Temple at Savli

Bhathiji also called Bhathiji Maharaj (as an honorific) is a folk deity of Gujarat. He is an eminent warrior-hero of the region.

== Legend ==
As per the folklore, Bhathi was the second son of Thakore shree Rathod Takhatsinhji of fagvel born in Rathod branch of Kshatriya clan. While he was marrying Kankuba and was completing the fourth of the seventh fera, he came to know that Muslim king of Kapadvanj, receiving a complaint against him had impounded the mother Gaus (Cow) of the village. Bhathiji immediately left riding a horse with his sword, leaving the marriage incomplete. He released the cow and defeated the army, but his head was severed from his body. He died as martyr but was able to free the cattle. There are folk songs of how Bhatihiji's headless body continued to fight the Muslim raiders till all of them were wiped out.

Bhathiji is ever since worshipped as a folk deity as a protector of cow and followers believe, those who worship Bhathiji are protected also from bites of snakes, cobras and scorpions. The Rathod Rajputs of Saurashtra worship his as kuladevata

The iconography of Bhatihiji is of a male warrior that rides a horse wielding a sword in his right hand.

In Devada village of Kheda district of Gujarat, hundreds of worshippers of Bhathiji, Hindus as well as Muslims, line up there every Friday to seek the blessings of the deity and the priest, and take a vow to renounce liquor.

There are four other fairs dedicated to Bhathiji are organised; at Mahmedpura in Nadiad taluka, Fagvel in Kapadvanj taluka, Kanij in Mahemadabad taluka and Valasan in Anand taluka on 2nd day of shukla paksha of Hindu calendar month of Kartik.

In 2002, Narendra Modi, then the Gujarat chief Minister, flagged off his Gaurav Yatra from Bhathiji Temeple at Phagvel.

                                          Now, Bhathiji descendants live in Limbarvada village near Virpur, Mahisagar.

There also exists, an organisation of the Kshatriya followers of Bhathiji called Bhathiji Sena.

A film about him was directed by Shantilal Soni and released in 1980 named Bhathiji na Mandire in 1980 and Bhathiji Maharaj in 1990, both in Gujarati. Also there are musical albums of bhajans and songs in his reverence available sung by local as well as known artists like Alka Yagnik.

== See also ==
- Vachara Dada
