= Gomathi Amman =

Gomathi Amman Temple,
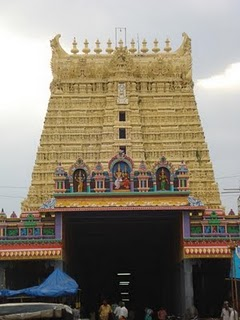
- Sankaranarayanar koil, Sankarankoil, Tenkasi

Religion
- Affiliation: Hinduism
- District: Tenkasi
- Deity: Lord Adhi shakthi

Location
- Location: Tenkasi
- State: Tamil Nadu
- Country: India

Gomathi amman for Hinduism in India is one of the manifestations of Adhi shakthi. The temple is located in the Sankarankovil Tenkasi district of the Indian state of Tamil Nadu. The temple is popularly known as Sankaranayinarkoil and she is the consort of vanmikanathar and seen along with sankaranarayanar(the unification of shiva and vishnu). This temple is 900 years old and was built by Ukkira Pandian a king from Pandiya dynasty. Adi Thabasu is very famous festival celebrated there every year.

== Story ==
The goddesses is a yogini who was performing her penance on the tip of the needle to please lord Shiva and merge with him. Two snake kings namely "sangan" and "padman". Sangan was worshipping lord shiva and padman was worshipping lord narayana. One day they had a quarrel on who is great whether lord shiva, the destroyer or narayana, the protector. They were trying to prove their own power and finally went to the yogini and pleaded her to give them a proper judgement.

The yogini grew out of her grace pleaded the almighty to show his universality form so that not only the snake kings but also for every human being. By the intense penance lord shiva appears before the yogini in the form of half shiva and half vishnu showing the world that they are equal and it is with love and sacrifice they could reach them. Hence sangan and padman worshipped the lord and prayed to the yogini for showing them a way to attain the god and they stayed with her. the yogini was none other than goddesses gomathi. Gomathi means repository of wealth. Since the snakes stayed with the goddesses, this place is free from all venomous creatures and praying to this goddesses can eliminate the fear of venom.

One of the 18 siddhas, the great pambatti siddhar worshipped this goddesses as valai kumari and he regarded this goddesses to be the great serpent power which can make miracles in taking aspirant in yogic transformation. Pambatti siddhar samadhi is seen behind the temple.

== Chakra Peetam and Aadi Thapasu ==
There is a circular hole in front of the Sanctum Sanctorum of the Goddess with a design of Sri Chakra inside it. There is a popular belief that any one afflicted with mental disorder worships the deity sitting on the hole will be cured of the disease.

"Aadi Thapasu" is one of the important festivals of Gomathi amman celebrated in the Tamil month of Aadi in a grand scale. The story on this: Sri Gomathi Ambal did Thapas at Punnai kshetra and Lord Shiva gave Her darshan as Sankaranarayanaswamy on the Uthirada day in the month of Adi (July–August) and thereby indicating that God Shiva and God Vishnu are same. Further to prove this theory, it is also said that Sankaranarayanasami gave darshan to Sankan and Padman. It is in practice to make the psychiatric patients, or those suffering from diseases and persons believed to have been haunted by evil spirits, to sit on Sri Chakra peetam, in front of Goddess Gomathi Amman continuously for 40 days so that they could be cured.

Maavilakku (offering made of rice) is an important offering to this amman. Those who come to visit this temple also offer miniatures of snake, scorpion and other reptiles to get rid of curses.

== Snake Pit ==
When a farmer was working in a nearby field (Perungootoor) to destroy an ant hill, he found blood flowing out from the Ant Hill after hit by the axe. He immediately rushed to the king and reported the incident. When the king came and searched he found the siva lingam inside the Ant Hill with two snakes (believed to be Sankan and Padman) protecting it. This lingam is brought from that place to the current temple. Mud is taken from this place every year on a particular occasion and placed inside the temple (on the praharam of gomathi amman's sanctum santorum) and it is believed that applying the holy sand/mud taken from the snake pit on one's body can cure various diseases.

It is believed that all devotees who pray to the goddess Gomathi amman have always found solace.
