= Katyayani =

Sixth form of goddess Durga

- Goddess of power
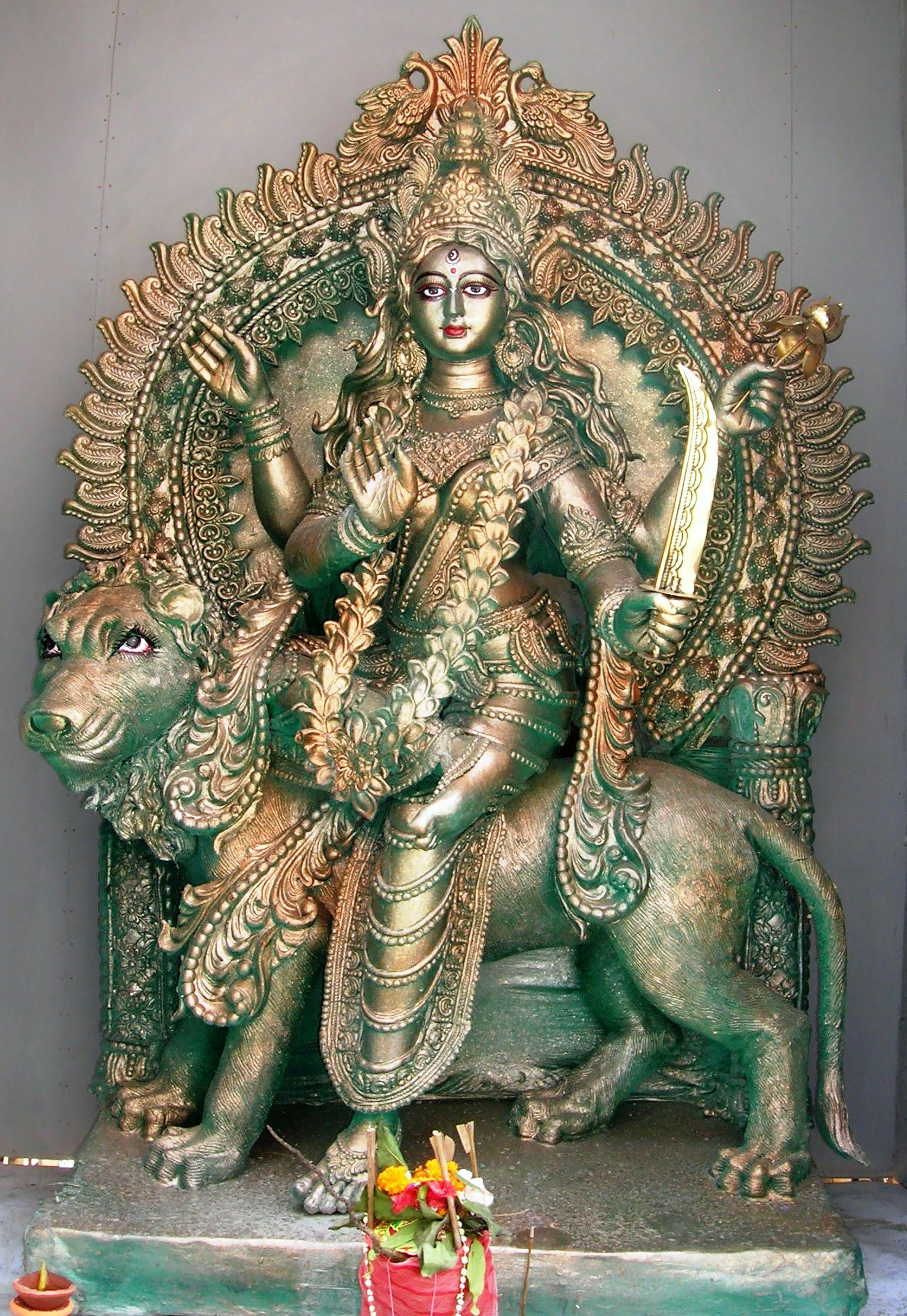
- Murti of Katyayani
- Affiliation: Avatar of Durga
- Abode: Manidvipa
- Mantra: oṃ devī kātyāyanyai namaḥ candrahāsojjvalakarā śārdūlavaravāhanā kātyāyanī śubhaṁ dadhyād devī dānavaghātinī
- Weapon: Khadga (longsword); Lotus, Abhayamudra, Varadamudra
- Mount: Lion

Katyayani (Sanskrit: कात्यायनी, romanized: Kātyāyanī, lit. 'she who is of Katya') is a form of the Hindu goddess Mahadevi, venerated as the slayer of the tyrannical asura Mahisha. She is the sixth of the Navadurga, and is worshipped on the sixth day of Navaratri.

In Shaktism, she is associated with the fierce forms of Shakti or Durga, a warrior goddess, which also includes Bhadrakali and Chandika.

== Iconography ==
Katyayani is typically depicted with four hands, riding a lion, and holding a sword and lotus flower, with her other two hands in abhaya and varada mudras, representing protection and granting boons. She is often shown with a radiant golden complexion, fierce eyes, and adorned with divine ornaments, While fierce, her face also carries a compassionate and protective expression, highlighting her role as a mother and protector of devotees.

She is traditionally associated with the colour red, as with Parvati, the primordial form of Shakti, a fact also mentioned in Patanjali's Mahabhashya on Pāṇini, written in 2nd century BCE.

In Hindu traditions like Yoga and Tantra, she is ascribed to the sixth ajna chakra or the third eye chakra, and her blessings are invoked by concentrating on this point.

== Origin ==
Katyayani is first mentioned in the Taittiriya Aranyaka part of the Yajurveda. The Skanda Purana mentions her being created out of the spontaneous anger of the gods, which eventually led to slaying the asura, Mahisha, mounted on the lion. This occasion is celebrated during the annual Durga Puja festival in most parts of India.

Her exploits are described in the Devi-Bhagavata Purana and Devi Mahatmyam, which are part of the Markandeya Purana attributed to sage Markandeya, who wrote it in Sanskrit ca. 400-500 CE. Over a period of time, her presence was also felt in Buddhist and Jain texts and several Tantric texts, especially the Kalika Purana (10th century), which mentions Uddiyana or Odradesa (Odisha), as the seat of Katyayani and Jagannath.

According to the Vamana Purana she was created from the combined energies of the gods when their anger at the asura Mahishasura manifested itself in the form of energy rays. The rays crystallized in the hermitage of Kātyāyana Rishi, who gave it proper form therefore she is also called Katyayani or "daughter of Katyayana". Elsewhere in texts like the Kalika Purana, it is mentioned that it was Rishi Kaytyayana who first worshipped her, hence she came to be known as Katyayani. In either case, she is a demonstration or apparition of the Durga and is worshipped on the sixth day of Navaratri festival.

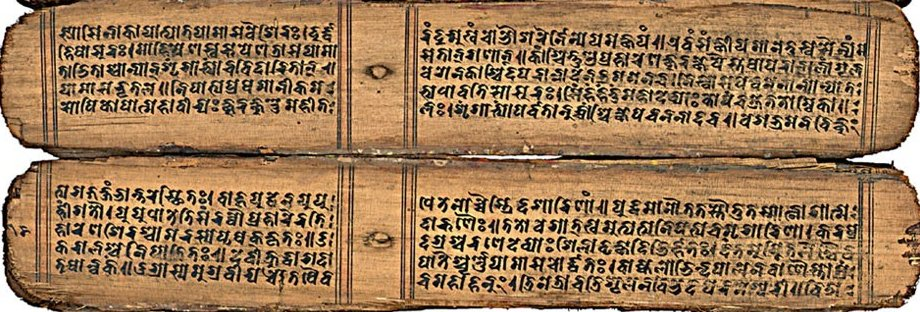
Devi Mahatmya in Sanskrit, the central text of Shaktism, dated 11 CE

The Vamana Purana mentions the legend of her creation in great detail: "When the gods had sought Vishnu in their distress, he and at his command Shiva, Brahma and the other gods, emitted such flames from their eyes and countenances that a mountain of effulgence was formed, from which became manifest Katyayani, refulgent as a thousand suns, having three eyes, black hair and eighteen arms. Shiva gave her his trident, Vishnu a Sudarshana Chakra or discus, Varuna a shankha, a conch-shell, Agni a dart, Vayu a bow, Surya a quiver full of arrows, Indra a thunderbolt, Kuvera a mace, Brahma a rosary and water-pot, Kala a shield and sword, Vishvakarma a battle-axe and other weapons. Thus armed and adored by the gods, Katyayani proceeded to the Mysore hills. There, the asuras saw her and captivated by her beauty they so described her to Mahishasura, their king, that he was anxious to obtain her. On asking for her hand, she told him she must be won in fight. He took on the form of Mahisha, the bull and fought; at length Durga dismounted from her lion, and sprang upon the back of Mahisha, who was in the form of a bull and with her tender feet smote him on the head with such a terrible force that he fell to the ground senseless. Then she cut off his head with her sword and henceforth was called Mahishasuramardini, the slayer of Mahishasura. The legend also finds mention in Varaha Purana and the classical text of Shaktism, the Devi-Bhagavata Purana.

== Regional legends ==
Raktabīja, an aide of Kolhasura, possessed a power (siddhi) whereby every drop of his blood spilled on earth would give rise to a asura. Due to this power, Bhairava was finding it impossible to kill Raktabīja. Katyayani swallowed all of Raktabīja's blood without letting it fall on earth. She created an Amrut Kunda (tank of nectar) to rejuvenate Bhairava's soldiers, thus playing a crucial role in the war. Her temple to the South of Kolhapur commemorates this.

The second among the shakti pithas is Tulja Bhavani of Tuljapur. It is the family deity of the Bhosale Royal family, the Yadavs and of countless numbers of families belonging to different castes. The founder of the Maratha kingdom, Shivaji always visited the temple to seek her blessings. It is believed that the goddess Durga Bhavani (Katyayani) gave him a sword - the Bhavani sword - for success in his expeditions. The history of the temple has been mentioned in the Skanda Purana.

According to Tantras, she revealed through the north face, which is one of six faces of Shiva. This face is blue in colour and with three eyes and also revealed the Devis, Dakshinakalika, Mahakali, Guhyakali, Smashanakalika, Bhadrakali, Ekajata, Ugratara (fierce Tara), Taritni, Chhinnamasta, Nilasarasvati (Blue Saraswati), Durga, Jayadurga, Navadurga, Vashuli, Dhumavati, Visalakshi, Parvati, Bagalamukhi, Pratyangira, Matangi, Mahishasuramardini, their rites and mantras.

== Worship ==
In the 10th Canto, 22nd Chapter of the Bhagavata Purana describes the legend of Katyayani Vrata, where young marriageable daughters (gopis) of the cowherd men of Gokula in Braja, worshipped Katyayani and took a vrata, or vow, during the entire month of Margashirsha, the first month of the winter season, to get Krishna as their husband. During the month, they ate only unspiced khichri and after bathing in the Yamuna at sunrise made an earthen deity of the goddess on the riverbank and worshipped the idol with aromatic substances like sandalwood pulp, lamps, fruits, betel nuts, newly grown leaves, fragrant garlands and incense. This precedes the episode where Krishna takes away their clothes while they are bathing in the Yamuna River. She is worshipped and revered on the 6th day of Navaratri. She is also considered to be sister of Surya, the sun god, and is worshipped along with him during the festival of Chhath Puja in the eastern parts of India.

The adolescent virgin goddess worshipped in the southern tip of India, Devi Kanya Kumari, is said to be the avatar of Katyayani or Parvati. During the Pongal (Thai Pongal), a harvest festival, which coincides with the Makara Sankranti and is celebrated in Tamil Nadu, young girls prayed for rain and prosperity and throughout the month, they avoided milk and milk products. Women used to bath early in the morning and worshiped the idol of Katyayani, carved out of wet sand. The penance ended on the first day of the month of Thai (January–February) in Tamil calendar.

== Temples ==
Commonly known as Chhatarpur temple, the Shree Adya Katyayani Shaktipeeth Mandir is located in the Mehrauli area of South Delhi. The temple complex is dedicated to Hindu goddess Katyayani and is noted for its marble architecture and intricately carved screens. The main shrine houses a golden image of the goddess, adorned with clothing, jewellery, and floral garlands. The shrine dedicated to Adya Shakti Katyayani is open for darshan on full moon days and during Navaratri festival twice a year. The temple also contains images Hindu deities such as Lakshmi, Ganesha, Shiva and Parvati and others.

- Delhi
  - Chhatarpur Temple, built in 1974.
- Gujarat:
  - Sri Katyayani Temple at Bakor in Mahisagar district.
- Haryana:
  - Katyayani temple at Kalayat in Kaithal district.
- Karnataka:
  - Shri Katyayani Baneshwar Temple, Aversa, built in 1510 CE, original idols brought from Goa during Portuguese rule.
- Kerala:
  - Sri Kartyayani Temple, Cherthala, Alappuzha, India.
  - Sri Kumaranalloor Karthyayani Temple at Kumaranalloor in Kottayam district.
- Maharashtra:
  - Sri Katyayani Temple in Kolhapur.
- Rajasthan:
  - Sri Katyayani Shakthipeeth Adhar Devi Temple (Arbuda Devi Temple) at Mount Abu in Aravali Range.
- Tamilnadu
  - Sri Kathyayini Amman Temple at Marathurai area if Thanjavur in Tanjore district.
  - Sri Kathayee Amman temple, Nelli Thoppu at Kovilur in Thanjavur city of Tanjore district.
- Uttar Pradesh:
  - Sri Katyayani Peeth Temple in Vrindavan.
