= Shri Katyayani Baneshwar Temple, Aversa =

Shri Katyayani Baneshwar Temple
- Location within Karnataka

Religion
- Affiliation: Hinduism
- District: Uttara Kannada, Ankola
- Deity: Shri Katyayani

Location
- Location: Aversa
- State: Karnataka
- Country: India
- Interactive map of Shri Katyayani Baneshwar Temple
- Coordinates: 14°43′24″N 74°16′47″E

Architecture
- Type: upturned boat
- Completed: Around 1600 AD

Website
- http://www.shreekatyayani.org

Shri Katyayani Baneshwar Temple (Kannada:ಶ್ರೀ ಕಾತ್ಯಾಯಿನಿ ಬಾಣೇಶ್ವರ ದೇವಸ್ತಾನ), (Sanskrit:श्री क़ात्यायनी बाणेश्व् र मन्दिर), or the Aversa Hindu Narayani is a Hindu temple in the coastal town of Aversa near Ankola, in the Uttara Kannada district of Karnataka.

Shri Katyayani is the Kuladevi (Kuladevata) (family deity) to many Konkani Gaud Saraswat Brahmins, Saraswat Brahmins, Daivajnya Brahmins and Konkani Kharvis.

The temple is managed by Shri Katyayani Baneshwar Temple Trust. The temple complex is run on solar energy.
