= Nalgudha =

Village in Rajasthan, India

Nalgudha Gudhanal
- Village
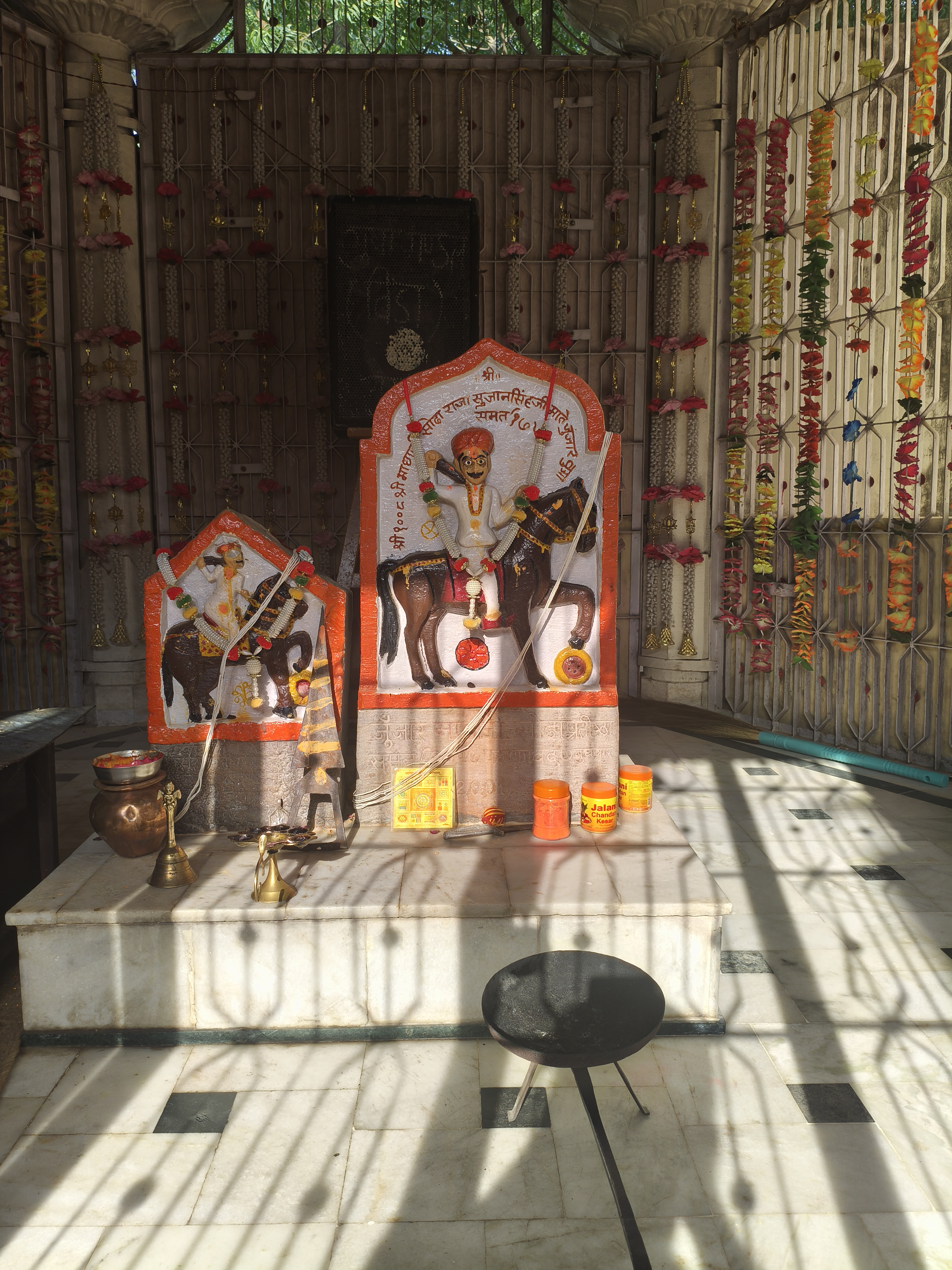
- Madhaji Junjhar

- Location in Rajasthan, India Nalgudha (India)
- Coordinates: 25°37′59″N 72°25′0″E
- Country: India
- State: Rajasthan
- District: Balotra district

Government
  - Body: Grampanchayat
- Elevation: 184 m (604 ft)

Population
  - Total: 1,163

Languages
  - Official: Hindi& Marwari [Siwanchi]
- Time zone: UTC+5:30 (IST)
- PIN: 344044
- Telephone code: +912901
- Vehicle registration: RJ-39
- Nearest city: Balotra
- Lok Sabha constituency: Barmer (Lok Sabha constituency)
- Vidhan Sabha constituency: Siwana
- Civic agency: Village

Nalgudha is a village in Balotra District, of Rajasthan, India. It is 9 km from Siwana and situated on Balotra . Nalguda has a total population of 1,163 peoples according to Census 2011.

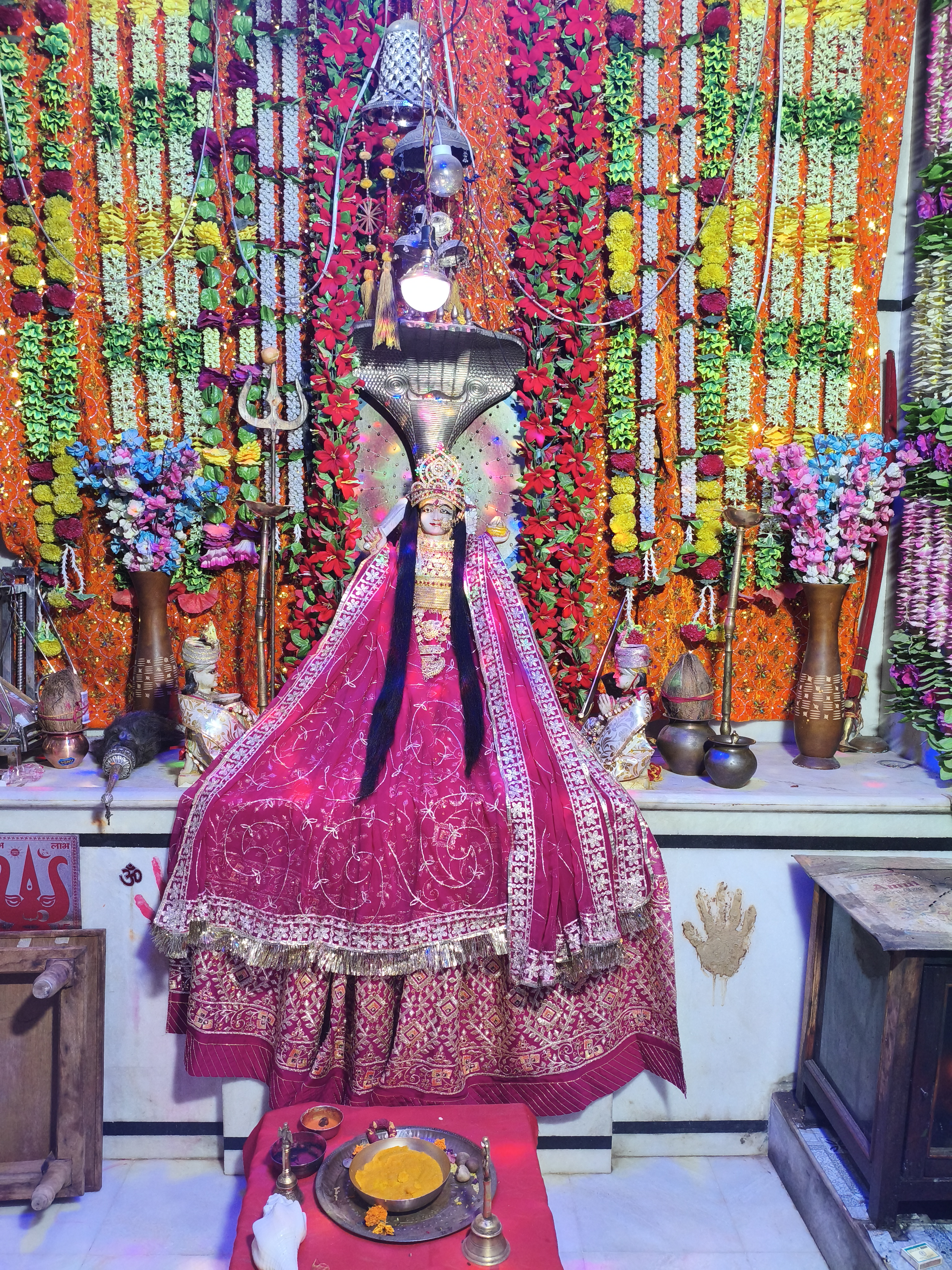
Nagnechi Mata Temple Nalgudha.

== Population ==
Nalgudha, Rajasthan, was 1,163 according to the 2011 Census. This village is located in the Balotra District of Rajasthan.

== Gellery ==
- Hanuman temple

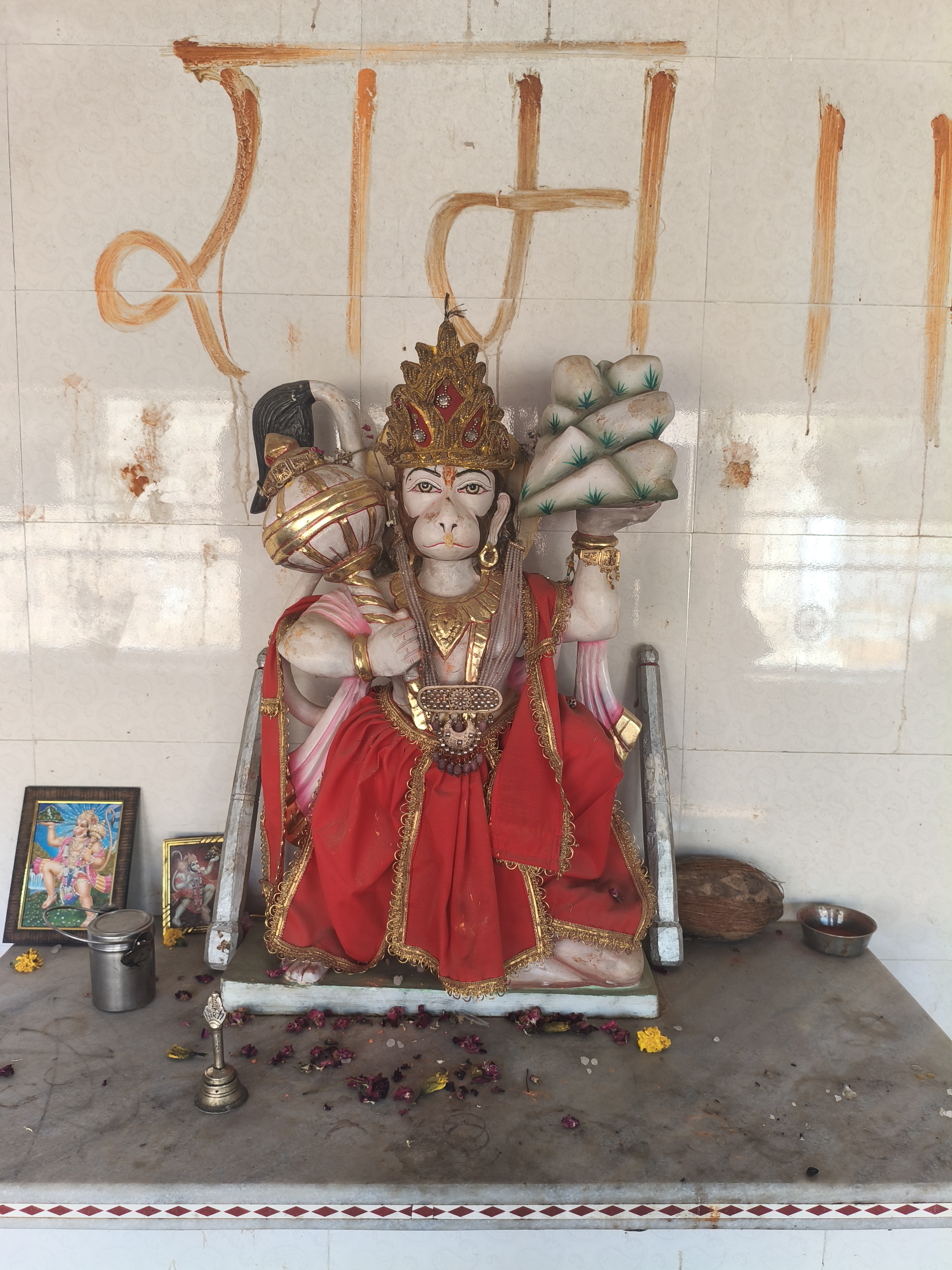
Hanuman temple.

- Nagnechi Mata Temple

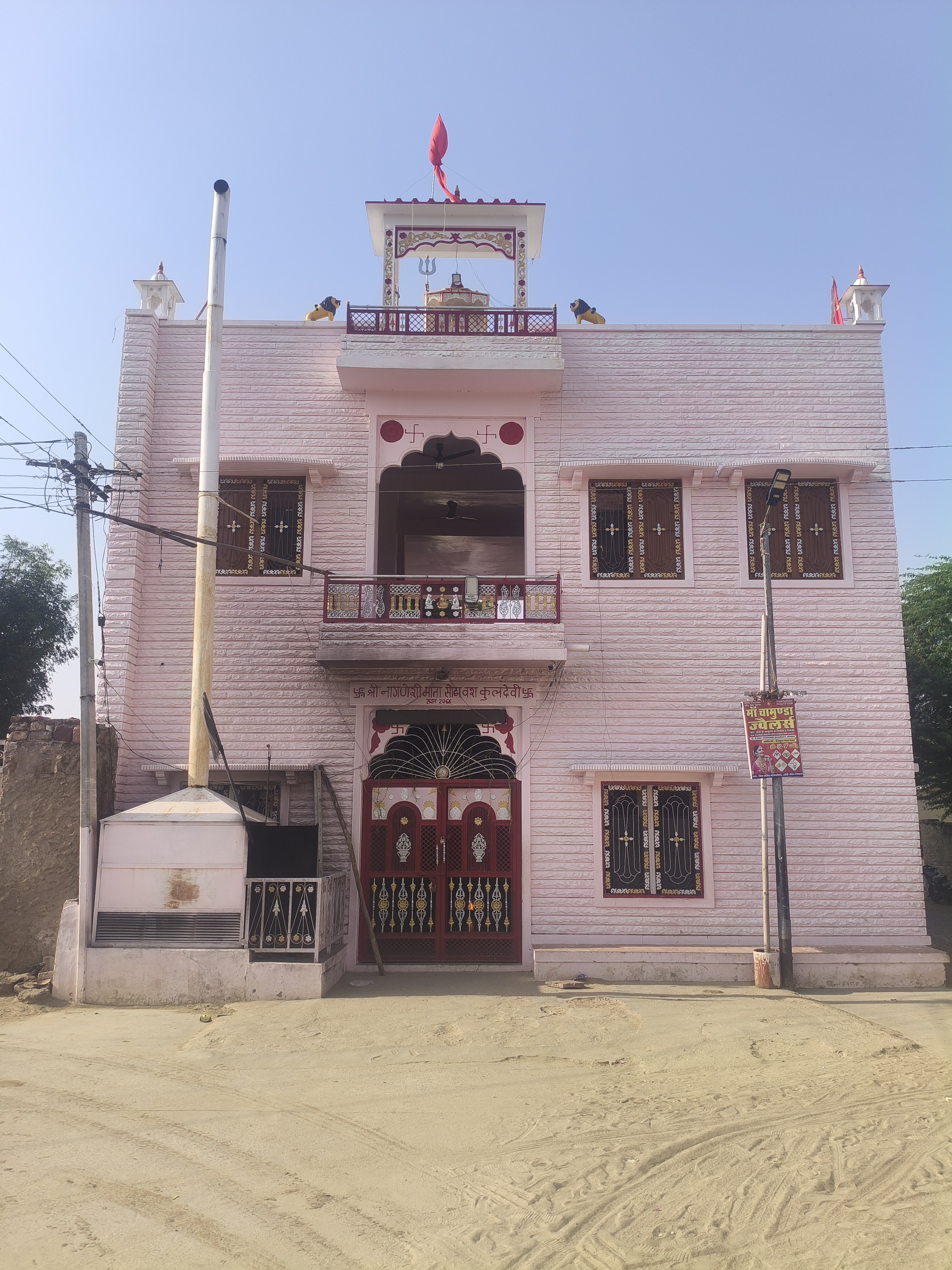
Nagnechi Mata Nalgudha.
