= Vachharadada =

Hindu deity

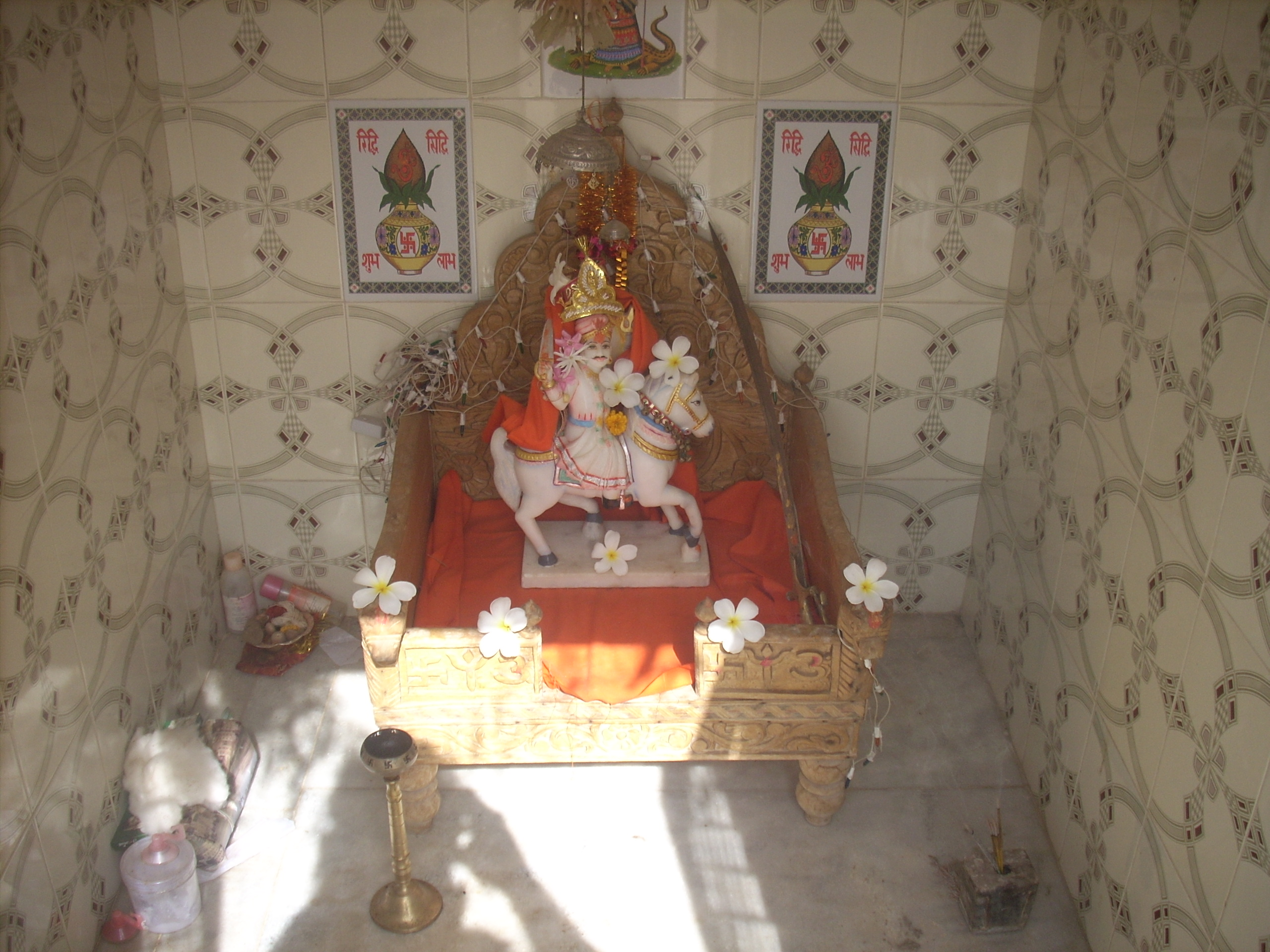
Idol of Vachra Dada at a shrine in Kutch.

Vachharadada or Vachhrajdada (Gujarati: ISO 15919: Vācharādādā, Vacharājdādā; Gujarati: વાછરાદાદા, વછરાજદાદા; IPA: vaːtʃʰəraːda:da:, vətʃʰəraːdʒda:da:) is a Hindu deity from Gujarat in India. He is an eminent warrior-hero of the region.

== Legends ==
Vachhraj Dada is known as a Solanki karadiya Rajput who died protecting the cows of the Charans, who were being raided by dacoits. He came to be worshipped by various communities like Charans, Ahirs, and Karadiya Rajputs. He is represented on a stone slab as sitting on a horse. Historically, Charans performed priestly functions at the shrine of Vachhraj Dada. The devotees considered taking vows in name of Vachhraj Dada would cure poisonous bites from snakes.

== Temples ==
The location where he became martyr is also named Vachhara Dada. It is located at the edge of Little Rann of Kutch, 35 km from Kuda (near Dhrangadhra); 15 km from Vatsrajpur, and 8 km from Zinzuwadia. The place today is a pilgrimage centre and houses the main temple and samadhi of Vachra Dada. 407 km from Zinjuvada, the temple of vachradada is situated at bitta. Ta. Abdasa-kutch which is known as Jangirdada.

Other major temples are located in Dundas, Mahuva, Narigam, Nari, Devada, Porbandar, Patan, Godhana, Bhanvad, Khambhalia, Dwarka, Mandvi, Anjar, Rangpur and Mahisa, Rajkot, Mauripur (Karachi, Pakistan) to name a few.

== See also ==
- Bhathiji
