= Morkhana =

Morkhana Sindh Morkhana
- Village
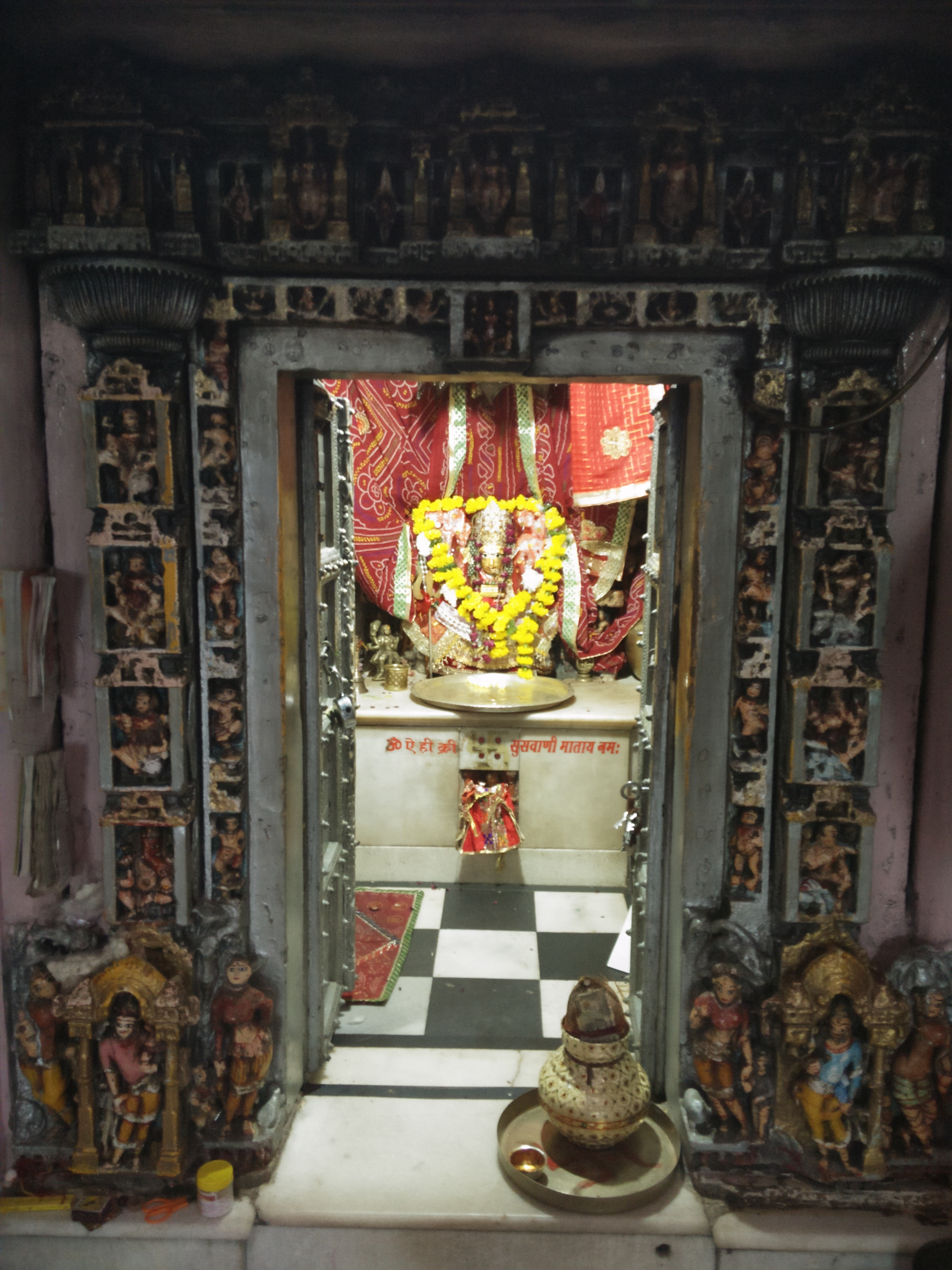
- Shri Suswani Mata Mandir Morkhana

- Location in Rajasthan, India
- Coordinates: 27.750730°N 73.540786°E
- Country: India
- State: Rajasthan
- District: Bikaner
- Founder: Mayur Dhwaj

Area
  - Total: 12 km^{2} (4.6 sq mi)
- Elevation: 97 m (318 ft)

Population (2011)
  - Total: 1,421
  - Rank: 61
  - Density: 123/km^{2} (320/sq mi)

Languages
  - Official: Hindi, Rajasthani
- Time zone: UTC+5:30 (IST)
- PIN: 334202

Morkhana is a village in Nokha Tehsil in the Bikaner district of the Indian state of Rajasthan.

== Geography ==
Morkhana is about 284 kilometers from the state capital of Jaipur.

== Temple ==
Morkhana is famous for its Suswani Devi temple, dedicated to the Goddess Suswani Mata. The temple is around 846 years old. It is constructed out of Jaisalmer stones where statues of demigods are carved on the outer walls.
