= Sharvani Devasthan =

Temple in the Indian state of Goa

Coordinates: 15°38′18″N 73°54′9″E

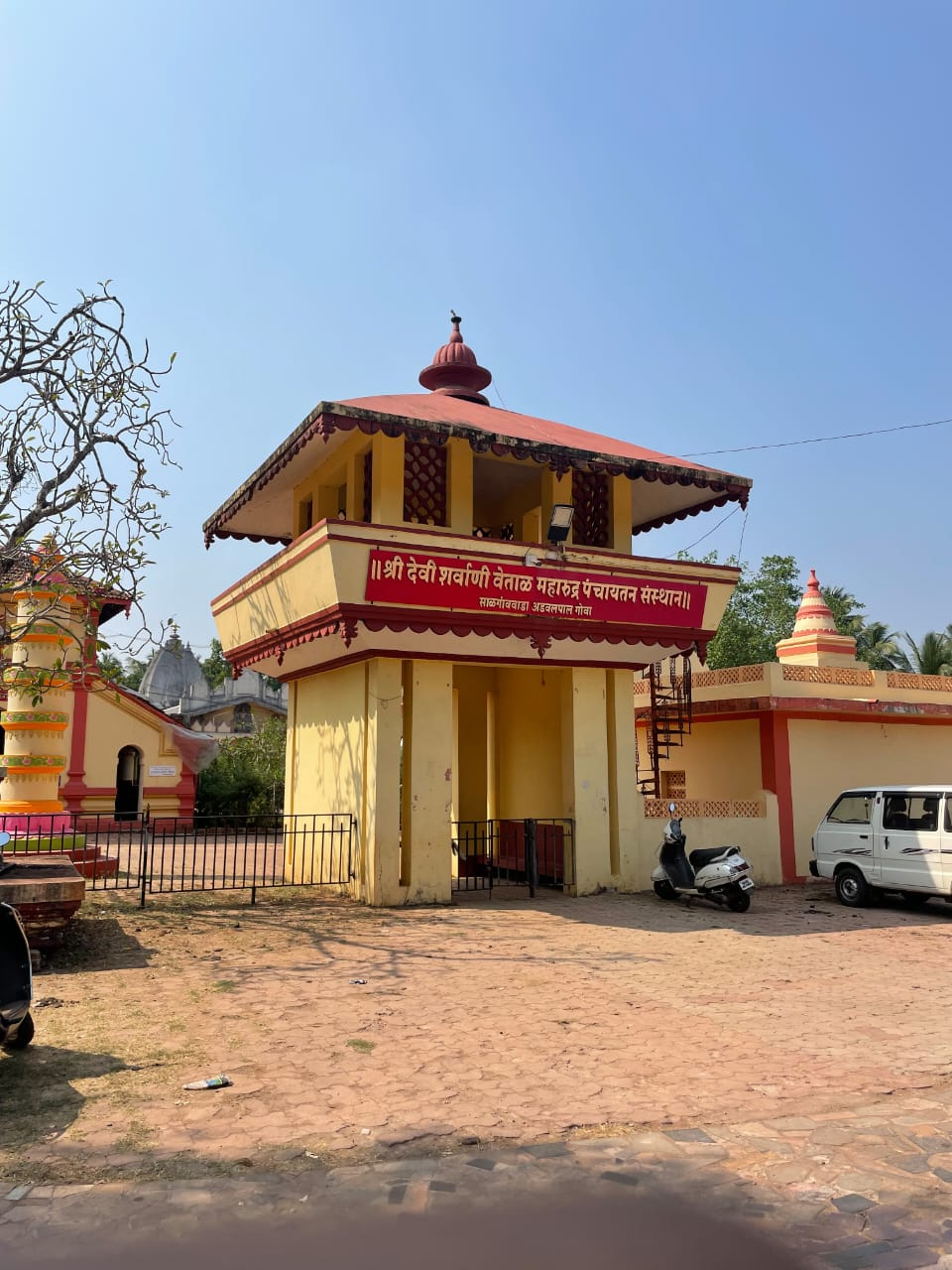

Sharvani Devasthan is the temple of Shri Devi Sharvani (Sharavani) and Vetoba (Vetal). It is located near the town of Bicholim in North Goa district in the Indian state of Goa. Vetoba is worshipped in the form of Shiva (Siva).

== Location ==
The temple is situated in Salgaonwada of Adavalpal village. The original temple of Goddess Sharvani was located at Saligaon.

== Devotee ==
The deity is the patron deity of Salgaonkar, Prabhus, Naiks, Shenai/Sinai s (Shenoys), Dhonds and Petkars.

== Notable people ==
- M. V. Dhond (Critic in Marathi Literature)
- Jayesh Salgaonkar (Housing with Housing Board, RDA, Ports Minister Goa assembly)

As of this edit, this article uses content from "Sharvani Devastan – Advalpal", which is licensed in a way that permits reuse under the Creative Commons Attribution-ShareAlike 3.0 Unported License, but not under the GFDL. All relevant terms must be followed.
