= Muthyalamma =

Hindu goddess

Muthyalamma is a Hindu goddess who is a form of Durga / Kali Matha. There are hundreds of temples to her in Hyderabad.

She is particularly worshipped in Ashada month during Mahankali festival in the Indian state of Telangana. Every weekend there are big celebrations in Bollarum and Secunderabad in the state.

Many notable people in Hyderabad visit this temple and offer their prayers. There is a growing belief that if you worship here for anything and promise to come back and pray, your desires will be fulfilled. There is one of the famous temple in Bangalore near Shivajinagar.

== See also ==
- Muthyala Maduvu
