= Gandheswari =

Aspect of goddess Durga

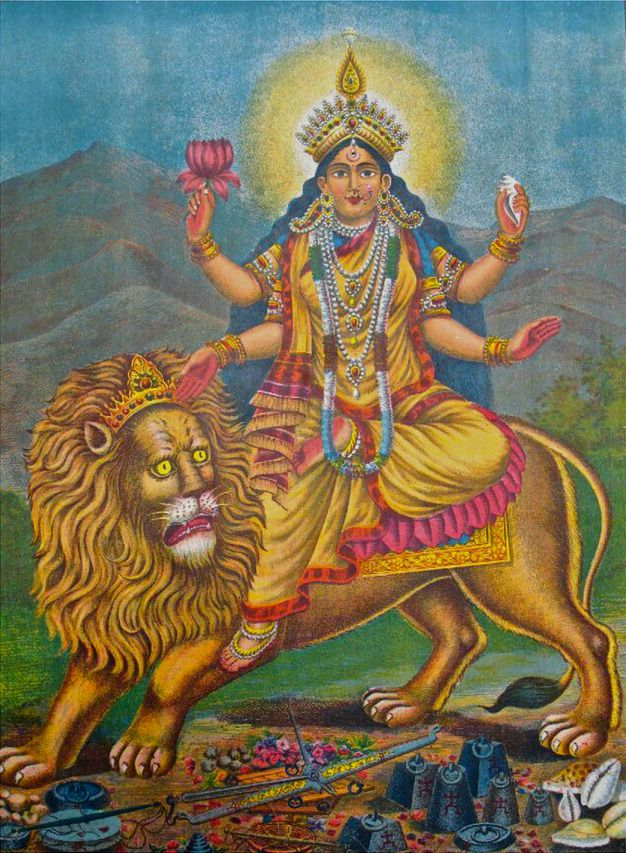
- Gandheswari, the deity worshipped by the Gandhabanik community.
- Affiliation: Durga, Shakti, Adi Parashakti, Parvati,
- Mantra: Gandheswari mantra
- Weapon: Conch, Lotus
- Mount: Lion
- Consort: Shiva

Gandheswari (IAST: Gandēśvarī;) is a goddess worshipped by Gandhabanik community. She is an incarnation of the goddess Durga. She is worshiped on Buddha Purnima by the Gandhabanik community. Gandhabanik community worships her as a kuldevi for their development in their business.

Bengali merchants used to travel by boat along the rivers in order to conduct business. They had to deal with robbers, wild animals, floods, storms, and heavy rains, among other hazards. The merchants worshipped the goddess Gandheshwari in the hopes that she would protect them from all dangers and misfortunes in order to defend themselves against these threats.

== Legends ==
According to Hindu scriptures, the primary mythological narrative surrounding Goddess Gandheswari involves her battle against the demon Gandhasura.

One day, while the sage Kashyapa, one of the seven great sages, was meditating, he heard the voice of a small child coming from the forest. His meditation was interrupted, so he followed the sound and found a little girl in the forest. Since her parents could not be found, the sage took her in and named her Gandhavati.

Gandhavati grew up in the ashram, helping the sage Kashyapa, during a time when the world was troubled by a demon named Gandhasura. This demon caused a lot of problems for the merchants. When Gandhavati became a young woman, Gandhasura attacked her and set her on fire while she was doing her prayers. To protect her devotees, the goddess came in the form of Gandhesvari. She fought and killed Gandhasura and threw his body into the ocean. From this, an island called Gandhadweepa was formed. Since then, Goddess Gandhesvari has been the family goddess of the Gandhabhani merchant community.

== Rituals ==
Gandheswari Puja is celebrated on Buddha Purnima, the full moon day of the Bengali month of Vaishakh-Joiyshto (April–May).

Durgā durgatihāriṇī bhavatu naḥ

Durgatihāriṇī durgā svarūpā

Duḥkha vināśinī trailokyeśvarī।।

Before the Puja day, the old murti is immersed in a pond or river on any day within the week leading up to the festival. On the Puja day or the day before, the new murti is brought home with the sound of dhak and kashor. The Puja begins, when the pandit arrives to perform the rituals and yagya, and family members observe a fast until they offer anjali.

The puja involves a variety of offerings and rituals. The items required for worship include an idol of the goddess, sindur (vermilion), panchagavya (five products from a cow, such as milk, butter, ghee, yogurt, etc.), panchasasya (five types of crops), pancharatna (five types of gems), panchapallab (five types of leaves), ghat (a small round-shaped earthen pot), darpan (mirror), green coconut with its stem, atap (sunned) rice, dhoti of Lord Shiva, Narayana, and Asura, sweetmeats, bilwapatramalya (garland of wood apple leaves), sesame, haritaki (yellow myrobalan), panchapuspa (five types of flowers), a conch, a piece of iron, naivedya (sacred offering for God), sandalwood, betel leaf, and nut, and others.

One unique thing about Gandheswari Puja is that it includes a ceremonial blessing of business tools and activities. Account books, weighing scales, and measuring tools are set up in a pyramid shape in front of the goddess. Modern practitioners also offer calculators and computers.

== Religious significance ==
According to Hindu religious tradition, the Gandhabanik community considers Goddess Gandheswari as their kuladevi (family goddess).

Gandheswari’s influence extends beyond the boundaries of India. In Bangladesh, a statue of Gandheswari, alongside other Hindu deities, adorns the Buddhist monastery of Paharpur.
