= Nagana, Balotra =

Village in Rajasthan, India

Nagana is a village in the Balotra district, formerly in the Barmer district.It is primarily known for the Nagnechiya Mata Temple, the ancestral deity (Kuldevi) of the Rathore Rajputs.

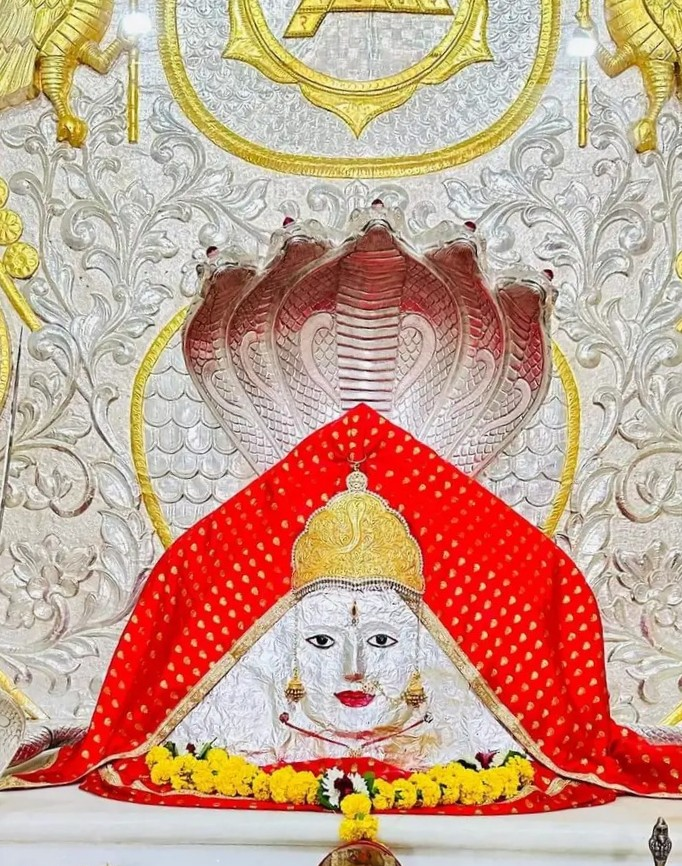
Nagnechiya Mata Nagana.

== Nagnechya Mataji Temple ==
Nagnechya Mataji Temple in Nagana is a highly revered Hindu shrine dedicated to the goddess Nagnechiya Mata, the Kuldevi (clan deity) of the Rathore Rajputs.Located in the Barmer region (now Balotra district) of Rajasthan, it is a significant pilgrimage site known for its spiritual atmosphere and intricate marble architecture.
