= Sankara Narayanasamy Temple =

Shiva temple in Tenkasi district, Tamil Nadu, India

Arulmigu Sankara Narayanasamy Temple
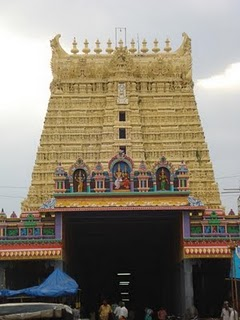

- Location within Tamil Nadu Location within India

Religion
- Affiliation: Hinduism
- District: Tenkasi district
- Deity: Sri Sankara Linga Swamy (Shiva); Gomathi Amman (Parvati); Shankaranayana Swamy (Mix of Shiva and Vishnu)
- Festivals: Cradle festival, Adithapasu festival, chithirai festival
- Governing body: Hindu Religious and Charitable Endowments Department

Location
- Location: Sankarankovil
- State: Tamil Nadu
- Coordinates: 9.16°N 77.55°E

Architecture
- Type: Dravidian architecture
- Elevation: 143 m (469 ft)

Website
- Official website

Sankara Narayanasamy Temple is a Hindu temple dedicated to Shiva located at Sankarankovil, in the state of Tamil Nadu in India. The temple was built by Ukkira Pandiyan in 10th century CE. Lord Shiva, known as ‘Sri Sankara Linga Swamy, is the presiding deity of this temple together with his consort Parvati, who is known as ‘Gomathi Amman’.

== Architecture ==
The Pandya king, Ukkra Pandiyan built the temple and named the town as "Sankara Narayanar Kovil".

== Temple Car Festival ==
The temple car festival is held in the month of Chithirai.The temple also emerged prosperous during the reign of Tenkasi Pandyas.

== Culture ==
A snake pit found in the prakaram located around the Amman Sannidhi inside the temple known as "Vanmikam". It is believed that the sand extracted from the snake pit will cure all diseases.

== Aadithapasu Festival ==
Aadithapasu Festival is held in the month of Ashadha involving the two gods Sankara Lingam and Narayanasamy. The ritual of the goddess Gomathi Amman posing in single foot is also followed.

== Darshan timings ==
The temple is open on all days. The darshan timings are as below:

- Morning : 05:30 to 12:30 IST
- Evening : 16:00 to 21:00 IST
