= Sadaiudayar =

Hindu temple dedicated to Lord Sadaiudayar

Coordinates: 8°39′9.91″N 77°27′31.73″E

Sadaiudayar is a Hindu temple. Lord Sadaiudayar, the presiding deity is the kula deivam (family deity) of a select set of Hindus mainly from Southern Tamil Nadu. Located in the Tirunelveli district this temple is mainly patronised by the matrilinear descendants of the Ettu Pillai Kootathar (family of the 8 sons).

== Legend ==
A poor Brahmin and his pregnant daughter were travelling along the base of the Western Ghats. As dusk fell and monsoon clouds gathered in the southwest, the daughter developed labor pains. The father went frantically searching for help, but found none except for an abandoned old temple. Dejected he came back to find a dark-skinned lady helping his daughter through a difficult child birth. The grateful old man offered the lady rice grains and coconut, his only possessions. The form of the lady disappeared and a voice was heard from above stating that the lady was a manifestation of Lord Sastha of whom the Brahmin was a staunch devotee. It also announced that his daughter would have seven more sons who would be eternally devoted to the deity Sadaiudayar, a form of Lord Sastha and goddess Raja rajeswari - known regionally as Porsadaiyachi. The voice also proclaimed that all direct descendants of the eight sons would remain devoted to the temple. The prophecy came true. The family is now known as the Ettu Pillai Kootathar and to this date remains devoted to the temple.

The temple has a humble appearance and is called Kudusai, which in Tamil means "hut". The offerings to this temple are rice and coconut and no cooked offering is permitted.
