= Medha rishi =

Sage mentioned in Hindu Shakta scriptures

Medha Rishi (also referred to as Sumedha Rishi) is a sage mentioned in Hindu Shakta scriptures, particularly in the Devi-Bhagavata Purana and the Devi Mahatmya (part of the Markandeya Purana). He is best known as the narrator of the Durga Saptashati (also called Chandi Path), a collection of stories celebrating the victories of the Goddess Durga.

== Scriptural accounts ==
In the Devi-Bhagavata Purana, King Suratha, having lost his kingdom, wanders into a forest and arrives at the hermitage of the ascetic Sumedha. There he meets Samadhi, a merchant (vaishya) who has also been driven from his home. Both men, troubled by attachment to what they have lost, approach the sage for guidance.

Medha Rishi listens to their concerns and explains that all beings are bound by the cosmic illusion (Māyā) of the Divine Mother. To illustrate his point, he narrates three exploits of the Goddess—her battles against Madhu–Kaitabha, Mahishasura, and Sumbha–Nishumbha—which together form the Durga Saptashati. The sage then initiates Suratha and Samadhi into sacred worship, after which the Goddess appears to grant Suratha the restoration of his kingdom and Samadhi spiritual liberation.

A similar account appears in the Devi Mahatmya (Markandeya Purana), where the sage is named Medhas. In both versions, Medha Rishi is portrayed as the wise guide who reveals the nature of the Goddess and the path to freedom from Māyā.

== Symbolism and interpretation ==
Scholars and commentators often view the characters symbolically. The name Suratha (“good chariot”) is said to represent the body or life force, Samadhi (“union”) the mind or meditative focus, and Medha(s) (“intellect” or “insight”) the higher wisdom that leads one to spiritual understanding. In this interpretation, Medha Rishi personifies the guiding intellect that directs seekers toward realization through devotion to the Goddess.

== Cultural significance ==
In Shakta tradition, Medha Rishi is revered as the storyteller whose narration of the Durga Saptashati bestows spiritual merit. Hearing or reciting his account is considered auspicious, and the Devi-Bhagavata Purana states that such recitation leads to knowledge, liberation, and fulfillment of desires.

== Rejuvenation of Ashram ==
In 2025, the Medha Rishi Ashram, located in the Sunwa forest near Ayodhya, Uttar Pradesh, underwent a government-led restoration project. The Uttar Pradesh Tourism Department allocated funds to renovate and beautify the ashram site to improve facilities for devotees and tourists.

== In popular culture ==
The story of Medha Rishi, King Suratha, and Samadhi has been adapted in various recitations and dramatizations of the Durga Saptashati, especially during Navaratri festivals in India and Nepal. Many audio recordings and televised readings of the scripture retain the framing dialogue of Medha Rishi with Suratha and Samadhi. In temple rituals, priests often begin the Chandi Path with an invocation referencing Medha Rishi as the narrator.

== See also ==
- Durga Saptashati
- Durga
- Devi Mahatmya
- Shaktism
- Markandeya Purana
