= Devīsūktam (Chandipatha) =

Sanskrit hymnal text

The Devisuktam (Sanskrit: दॆवीसूक्तम्), also popularly called as the Tamtroktadevisuktam (तंत्रॊक्तदेवीसूक्तम्), is a hymnal text that occurs in the 5th chapter of the Devimahatmyam (दॆवीमाहात्म्यम्), also known as Durgasaptashati (दुर्गासप्तशती). The Devimahatmyam, in turn, forms a part of the Savarnikamanvantara Section (सावर्णिकमन्वन्तर, Chapters 77 - 90) of the Markandeyapurana (मार्कंडेयपुराण).

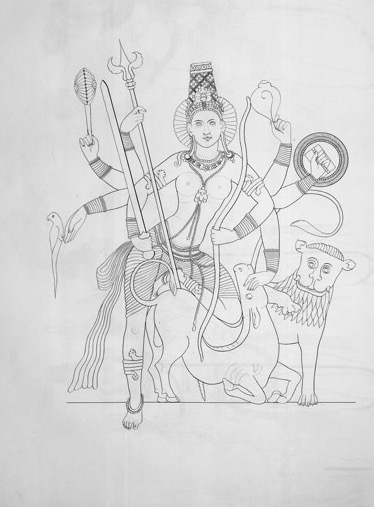
A sketch of Durga from a 6th-century temple sculpture, Aihole, Karnataka.

The Devisuktam eulogises the manifold manifestations of the fierce goddess (Devi), Chandi or Durga (दुर्गा), in her objective and subjective aspects. This hymn is very popular and is chanted every day in the Devi temples across India, during the morning and evening ritual worship. It is specially recited during the Sarannavaratri festival which occurs in the Gregorian months of October - November; it is also recited during the Vasantanavaratri.

This particular Devīsūktam belongs to the Puranic and Tantric traditions. It is different from, and should not be confused with, the Devīsūkta which occurs in the 10th mandala of the Ṛgveda.

== Text with meaning ==
=== Preamble ===
The Devīsūktam belongs to the 5th Chapter of the Devīmāhātmyam. In the preceding (4th) chapter, the Devī, having slain the demon Mahiṣāsura (महिषासुर), assures the gods that she would help them if they come to distress in the future too.

After some time, two asura (demon) brothers, Śuṃbha and Niśuṃbha terrorise the three worlds, usurp the offices and powers Sūrya, Caṃdra, Kubera, Yama, Varuṇa, Agni, Vāyu and other gods, and establish themselves in their steads. These gods, having been defeated and having lost their power, authority and honour, recall the assurance given by the Devī of alleviating them from their troubles. They decide to pray for her help, and arrive at the Himalayas. Having assembled there, they begin praising Her, who is also known as Aparājitā (अपराजिता) and Viṣṇumāyā (विष्णुमाया):

=== Devīsūktam ===
देवा ऊचुः॥

The gods spoke thus:

नमो देव्यै महादेव्यै शिवायै सततं नमः । नमः प्रकृत्यै भद्रायै नियताः प्रणताः स्म ताम् ॥

namo devyai mahādevyai śivāyai satataṃ namaḥ। namaḥ prakṛtyai bhadrāyai niyatāḥ praṇatāḥ sma tām॥

"Our obeisances unto the Devī, the Great Goddess; our constant salutations to that Auspicious One; our obeisances to Her who is Nature (First Born, Primordial Cause); with humble self-restraint, we salute the Gracious One.

रौद्रायै नमो नित्यायै गौर्यै धात्र्यै नमो नमः । ज्योत्स्नायै चेन्दुरूपिण्यै सुखायै सततं नमः ॥ १०॥

raudrāyai namo nityāyai gauryai dhātryai namo namaḥ। jyotsnāyai cendurūpiṇyai sukhāyai satataṃ namaḥ॥

"Our repeated obeisances to the Ferocious, Eternal and Bright One, who is the Mother & Earth; our continual obeisances to Her who is the Moon and the Moonlight, and who is Bliss.

कल्याण्यै प्रणतामृद्ध्यै सिद्ध्यै कूर्म्यै नमो नमः । नैर्ऋत्यै भूभृतां लक्ष्म्यै शर्वाण्यै ते नमो नमः ॥

kalyāṇyai praṇatāmṛddhyai siddhyai kūrmyai namo namaḥ। nairṛtyai bhūbhṛtāṃ lakṣmyai śarvāṇyai te namo namaḥ॥

"Our obeisances to the ever Beneficial One, to Her who bestows abundance (of knowledge, peace, happiness, wealth), to her who is of the form of siddhi (success, attainment, perfection), to Her again and again who is in the form of the śhakti of the Kūrmadevata (a form of Vishṇu); our many salutations to Her who is also in the form of Nirṛti (the ill-gotten wealth which deludes and destroys the wicked!), to Her who is in the form of the great wealth of kings, and to her who is the consort of Śarva (Shiva). (There is an alternate reading to this verse which replaces 'kūrmyai' with 'kurmo'.)

दुर्गायै दुर्गपारायै सारायै सर्वकारिण्यै । ख्यात्यै तथैव कृष्णायै धूम्रायै सततं नमः ॥

durgāyai durgapārāyai sārāyai sarvakāriṇyai। khyātyai tathaiva kṛṣṇāyai dhūmrāyai satataṃ namaḥ॥

"Our obeisances to Her who is invincible, incomprehensible and unassailable (Durgā), to Her who helps us cross over the difficulties (alternatively, whose limits are infinite and unknowable), to Her who is the Essence (of all), and to Her who is the Primordial Cause of everything; our continual obeisances to Her who is in the form of Renown, and who is dark and smoky (beyond human comprehension; also, the form of Kālarātri).

अतिसौम्यातिरौद्रायै नतास्तस्यै नमो नमः । नमो जगत्प्रतिष्ठायै देव्यै कृत्यै नमो नमः ॥

atisaumyātiraudrāyai natāstasyai namo namaḥ। namo jagatpratiṣṭhāyai devyai kṛtyai namo namaḥ॥

"Our obeisances to Her who, at once, is extremely gentle (like the Moon or a flower) as well as extremely terrible - and we bow down to Thee again and again; our repeated salutations to Her who is the support of the universe, the Ruler, and who is the Efficient Cause (of creation, maintenance and destruction of the universe).

या देवी सर्वभूतेषु विष्णुमायेति शब्दिता । नमस्तस्यै नमस्तस्यै नमस्तस्यै नमो नमः ॥

yā devī sarvabhūteṣu viṣṇumāyeti śabditā। namastasyai namastasyai namastasyai namo namaḥ॥

"Our obeisances to Her, the Devī, who is called as Viṣṇumāyā (the incomprehensible power of Viṣṇu which seemingly projects Time-Space-Causality) in all beings; our (bodily) salutations to Her, our (verbal) salutations to Her, our (mental) salutations to Her; our salutations again and again.

या देवी सर्वभूतेषु चेतनेत्यभिधीयते । नमस्तस्यै नमस्तस्यै नमस्तस्यै नमो नमः ॥

yā devī sarvabhūteṣu cetanetyabhidhīyate। namastasyai namastasyai namastasyai namo namaḥ॥

"Our obeisances to Her, the Devī, who is known as Consciousness (awareness, sentience) in all beings; our (bodily) salutations to Her, our (verbal) salutations to Her, our (mental) salutations to Her; our salutations again and again.

या देवी सर्वभूतेषु बुद्धिरूपेण संस्थिता । नमस्तस्यै नमस्तस्यै नमस्तस्यै नमो नमः ॥

yā devī sarvabhūteṣu buddhirūpeṇa saṃsthitā। namastasyai namastasyai namastasyai namo namaḥ॥

"Our obeisances to Her, the Devī, who abides in all beings as intellect (discriminating, decisive intelligence); our (bodily) salutations to Her, our (verbal) salutations to Her, our (mental) salutations to Her; our salutations again and again.

या देवी सर्वभूतेषु निद्रारूपेण संस्थिता । नमस्तस्यै नमस्तस्यै नमस्तस्यै नमो नमः ॥

yā devī sarvabhūteṣu nidrārūpeṇa saṃsthitā। namastasyai namastasyai namastasyai namo namaḥ॥

"Our obeisances to Her, the Devī, who abides in all beings as sleep (giving respite and rejuvenation); our (bodily) salutations to Her, our (verbal) salutations to Her, our (mental) salutations to Her; our salutations again and again.

या देवी सर्वभूतेषु क्षुधारूपेण संस्थिता । नमस्तस्यै नमस्तस्यै नमस्तस्यै नमो नमः ॥

yā devī sarvabhūteṣu kṣudhārūpeṇa saṃsthitā। namastasyai namastasyai namastasyai namo namaḥ॥

"Our obeisances to Her, the Devī, who abides in all beings as hunger (and thirst, by implication); our (bodily) salutations to Her, our (verbal) salutations to Her, our (mental) salutations to Her; our salutations again and again.

या देवी सर्वभूतेषु छायारूपेण संस्थिता । नमस्तस्यै नमस्तस्यै नमस्तस्यै नमो नमः ॥

yā devī sarvabhūteṣu chāyārūpeṇa saṃsthitā। namastasyai namastasyai namastasyai namo namaḥ॥

"Our obeisances to Her, the Devī, who abides in all beings as shadow (the individual self, which is the reflection of the Higher Self); our (bodily) salutations to Her, our (verbal) salutations to Her, our (mental) salutations to Her; our salutations again and again.

या देवी सर्वभूतेषु शक्तिरूपेण संस्थिता । नमस्तस्यै नमस्तस्यै नमस्तस्यै नमो नमः ॥

yā devī sarvabhūteṣu śaktirūpeṇa saṃsthitā। namastasyai namastasyai namastasyai namo namaḥ॥

"Our obeisances to Her, the Devī, who abides in all beings as energy (or the powers of will, knowledge and action); our (bodily) salutations to Her, our (verbal) salutations to Her, our (mental) salutations to Her; our salutations again and again.

या देवी सर्वभूतेषु तृष्णारूपेण संस्थिता । नमस्तस्यै नमस्तस्यै नमस्तस्यै नमो नमः ॥

yā devī sarvabhūteṣu tṛṣṇārūpeṇa saṃsthitā। namastasyai namastasyai namastasyai namo namaḥ॥

"Our obeisances to Her, the Devī, who abides in all beings as thirst (incessant craving for sensual pleasures that bind the individuals to the world); our (bodily) salutations to Her, our (verbal) salutations to Her, our (mental) salutations to Her; our salutations again and again.

या देवी सर्वभूतेषु क्षान्तिरूपेण संस्थिता । नमस्तस्यै नमस्तस्यै नमस्तस्यै नमो नमः ॥

yā devī sarvabhūteṣu kṣāntirūpeṇa saṃsthitā। namastasyai namastasyai namastasyai namo namaḥ॥

"Our obeisances to Her, the Devī, who abides in all beings as forbearance (forgiveness); our (bodily) salutations to Her, our (verbal) salutations to Her, our (mental) salutations to Her; our salutations again and again.

या देवी सर्वभूतेषु जातिरूपेण संस्थिता । नमस्तस्यै नमस्तस्यै नमस्तस्यै नमो नमः ॥

yā devī sarvabhūteṣu jātirūpeṇa saṃsthitā। namastasyai namastasyai namastasyai namo namaḥ॥

"Our obeisances to Her, the Devī, who abides in all beings as genus (breed, species, descent that distinguishes one from the other, and hence the Original Cause); our (bodily) salutations to Her, our (verbal) salutations to Her, our (mental) salutations to Her; our salutations again and again.

या देवी सर्वभूतेषु लज्जारूपेण संस्थिता । नमस्तस्यै नमस्तस्यै नमस्तस्यै नमो नमः ॥

yā devī sarvabhūteṣu lajjārūpeṇa saṃsthitā। namastasyai namastasyai namastasyai namo namaḥ॥

"Our obeisances to Her, the Devī, who abides in all beings as modesty (sense of shame, shyness, knowledge of one's limitations); our (bodily) salutations to Her, our (verbal) salutations to Her, our (mental) salutations to Her; our salutations again and again.

या देवी सर्वभूतेषु शान्तिरूपेण संस्थिता । नमस्तस्यै नमस्तस्यै नमस्तस्यै नमो नमः ॥

yā devī sarvabhūteṣu śāntirūpeṇa saṃsthitā। namastasyai namastasyai namastasyai namo namaḥ॥

"Our obeisances to Her, the Devī, who abides in all beings as peace; our (bodily) salutations to Her, our (verbal) salutations to Her, our (mental) salutations to Her; our salutations again and again.

या देवी सर्वभूतेषु श्रद्धारूपेण संस्थिता । नमस्तस्यै नमस्तस्यै नमस्तस्यै नमो नमः ॥

yā devī sarvabhūteṣu śraddhārūpeṇa saṃsthitā। namastasyai namastasyai namastasyai namo namaḥ॥

"Our obeisances to Her, the Devī, who abides in all beings as faith (diligence, sincerity, earnestness); our (bodily) salutations to Her, our (verbal) salutations to Her, our (mental) salutations to Her; our salutations again and again.

या देवी सर्वभूतेषु कान्तिरूपेण संस्थिता । नमस्तस्यै नमस्तस्यै नमस्तस्यै नमो नमः ॥

yā devī sarvabhūteṣu kāntirūpeṇa saṃsthitā। namastasyai namastasyai namastasyai namo namaḥ॥

"Our obeisances to Her, the Devī, who abides in all beings as radiance (splendour, beauty which varies from being to being); our (bodily) salutations to Her, our (verbal) salutations to Her, our (mental) salutations to Her; our salutations again and again.

या देवी सर्वभूतेषु लक्ष्मीरूपेण संस्थिता । नमस्तस्यै नमस्तस्यै नमस्तस्यै नमो नमः ॥

yā devī sarvabhūteṣu lakṣmīrūpeṇa saṃsthitā। namastasyai namastasyai namastasyai namo namaḥ॥

"Our obeisances to Her, the Devī, who abides in all beings as Lakṣmī (fortune; prosperity; all kinds wealth like knowledge, victory, health, fame, youthfulness, joy, bliss, liberation ); our (bodily) salutations to Her, our (verbal) salutations to Her, our (mental) salutations to Her; our salutations again and again.

या देवी सर्वभूतेषु धृतिरूपेण संस्थिता । नमस्तस्यै नमस्तस्यै नमस्तस्यै नमो नमः ॥

yā devī sarvabhūteṣu dhṛtirūpeṇa saṃsthitā। namastasyai namastasyai namastasyai namo namaḥ॥

"Our obeisances to Her, the Devī, who abides in all beings as poise (courage; balance); our (bodily) salutations to Her, our (verbal) salutations to Her, our (mental) salutations to Her; our salutations again and again. (This verse is present only in some recensions of the text).

या देवी सर्वभूतेषु वृत्तिरूपेण संस्थिता । नमस्तस्यै नमस्तस्यै नमस्तस्यै नमो नमः ॥

yā devī sarvabhūteṣu vṛttirūpeṇa saṃsthitā। namastasyai namastasyai namastasyai namo namaḥ॥

"Our obeisances to Her, the Devī, who abides in all beings as activity (physical, verbal and mental actions that sustain life); our (bodily) salutations to Her, our (verbal) salutations to Her, our (mental) salutations to Her; our salutations again and again.

या देवी सर्वभूतेषु स्मृतिरूपेण संस्थिता । नमस्तस्यै नमस्तस्यै नमस्तस्यै नमो नमः ॥

yā devī sarvabhūteṣu smṛtirūpeṇa saṃsthitā। namastasyai namastasyai namastasyai namo namaḥ॥

"Our obeisances to Her, the Devī, who abides in all beings as memory; our (bodily) salutations to Her, our (verbal) salutations to Her, our (mental) salutations to Her; our salutations again and again.

या देवी सर्वभूतेषु दयारूपेण संस्थिता । नमस्तस्यै नमस्तस्यै नमस्तस्यै नमो नमः ॥

yā devī sarvabhūteṣu dayārūpeṇa saṃsthitā। namastasyai namastasyai namastasyai namo namaḥ॥

"Our obeisances to Her, the Devī, who abides in all beings as compassion (kindness); our (bodily) salutations to Her, our (verbal) salutations to Her, our (mental) salutations to Her; our salutations again and again.

या देवी सर्वभूतेषु नीतिरूपेण संस्थिता । नमस्तस्यै नमस्तस्यै नमस्तस्यै नमो नमः ॥

yā devī sarvabhūteṣu nītirūpeṇa saṃsthitā। namastasyai namastasyai namastasyai namo namaḥ॥

"Our obeisances to Her, the Devī, who abides in all beings as morality (law; righteous conduct); our (bodily) salutations to Her, our (verbal) salutations to Her, our (mental) salutations to Her; our salutations again and again. (This verse is present only in some recensions of the text).

या देवी सर्वभूतेषु तुष्टिरूपेण संस्थिता । नमस्तस्यै नमस्तस्यै नमस्तस्यै नमो नमः ॥

yā devī sarvabhūteṣu tuṣṭirūpeṇa saṃsthitā। namastasyai namastasyai namastasyai namo namaḥ॥

"Our obeisances to Her, the Devī, who abides in all beings as contentment (fulfillment); our (bodily) salutations to Her, our (verbal) salutations to Her, our (mental) salutations to Her; our salutations again and again.

या देवी सर्वभूतेषु पुष्टिरूपेण संस्थिता । नमस्तस्यै नमस्तस्यै नमस्तस्यै नमो नमः ॥

yā devī sarvabhūteṣu puṣṭirūpeṇa saṃsthitā। namastasyai namastasyai namastasyai namo namaḥ॥

"Our obeisances to Her, the Devī, who abides in all beings as nourishment (food); our (bodily) salutations to Her, our (verbal) salutations to Her, our (mental) salutations to Her; our salutations again and again. (This verse is present only in some recensions of the text).

या देवी सर्वभूतेषु मातृरूपेण संस्थिता । नमस्तस्यै नमस्तस्यै नमस्तस्यै नमो नमः ॥

yā devī sarvabhūteṣu mātṛrūpeṇa saṃsthitā। namastasyai namastasyai namastasyai namo namaḥ॥

"Our obeisances to Her, the Devī, who abides in all beings as the mother; our (bodily) salutations to Her, our (verbal) salutations to Her, our (mental) salutations to Her; our salutations again and again.

या देवी सर्वभूतेषु भ्रान्तिरूपेण संस्थिता । नमस्तस्यै नमस्तस्यै नमस्तस्यै नमो नमः ॥

yā devī sarvabhūteṣu bhrāntirūpeṇa saṃsthitā। namastasyai namastasyai namastasyai namo namaḥ॥

"Our obeisances to Her, the Devī, who abides in all beings as delusion (that causes erroneous knowledge); our (bodily) salutations to Her, our (verbal) salutations to Her, our (mental) salutations to Her; our salutations again and again.

इन्द्रियाणामधिष्ठात्री भूतानां चाखिलेषु या । भूतेषु सततं व्याप्त्यै तस्यै देव्यै नमो नमः ॥

indriyāṇāmadhiṣṭhātrī bhūtānāṃ cākhileṣu yā । bhūteṣu satataṃ vyāptyai tasyai devyai namo namaḥ ॥

"Our obeisances to Her, who is the supporting ground (and governing force) of the faculty of actions and senses (karmendriya and jnānendriya) in all beings; our many salutations to Her who pervades everything (animate and inanimate).

चितिरूपेण या कृत्स्नमेतद्व्याप्य स्थिता जगत् । नमस्तस्यै नमस्तस्यै नमस्तस्यै नमो नमः ॥

citirūpeṇa yā kṛtsnametadvyāpya sthitā jagat । namastasyai namastasyai namastasyai namo namaḥ ॥

"Our obeisances to Her, who abides in all things as Consciousness and pervades the universe (as the Self); our (bodily) salutations to Her, our (verbal) salutations to Her, our (mental) salutations to Her; our salutations again and again.

स्तुता सुरैः पूर्वमभीष्टसंश्रयात्तथा सुरेन्द्रेण दिनेषु सेविता । करोतु सा नः शुभहेतुरीश्वरी शुभानि भद्राण्यभिहन्तु चापदः ॥ या साम्प्रतं चोद्धतदैत्यतापितैरस्माभिरीशा च सुरैर्नमस्यते ।या च स्मृता तत्क्षणमेव हन्ति नः सर्वापदो भक्तिविनम्रमूर्तिभिः ॥

stutā suraiḥ pūrvamabhīṣṭasaṃśrayāttathā surendreṇa dineṣu sevitā ।

karotu sā naḥ śubhaheturīśvarī śubhāni bhadrāṇyabhihantu cāpadaḥ ॥

yā sāmprataṃ coddhatadaityatāpitairasmābhirīśā ca surairnamasyate ।

yā ca smṛtā tatkṣaṇameva hanti naḥ sarvāpado bhaktivinamramūrtibhiḥ ॥

"May She who is our Ruler, She who is the Cause of all auspiciousness, She who was praised and served earlier for many days by Indra and other gods to obtain their desires, She who shatters all the perils of us gods the very moment She is remembered, annihilate our present crisis as we stand troubled by the arrogant, intoxicated asuras; may She grace us gods who bow down to Her and salute Her with devotion, may She bestow upon us all the auspicious fortunes, and put an end to our distress".
