= Kaushiki =

Hindu goddess

- Power, strength, protection, War The destroyer of Shumbha and Nishumbha, one of the principal incarnations of the goddess Durga
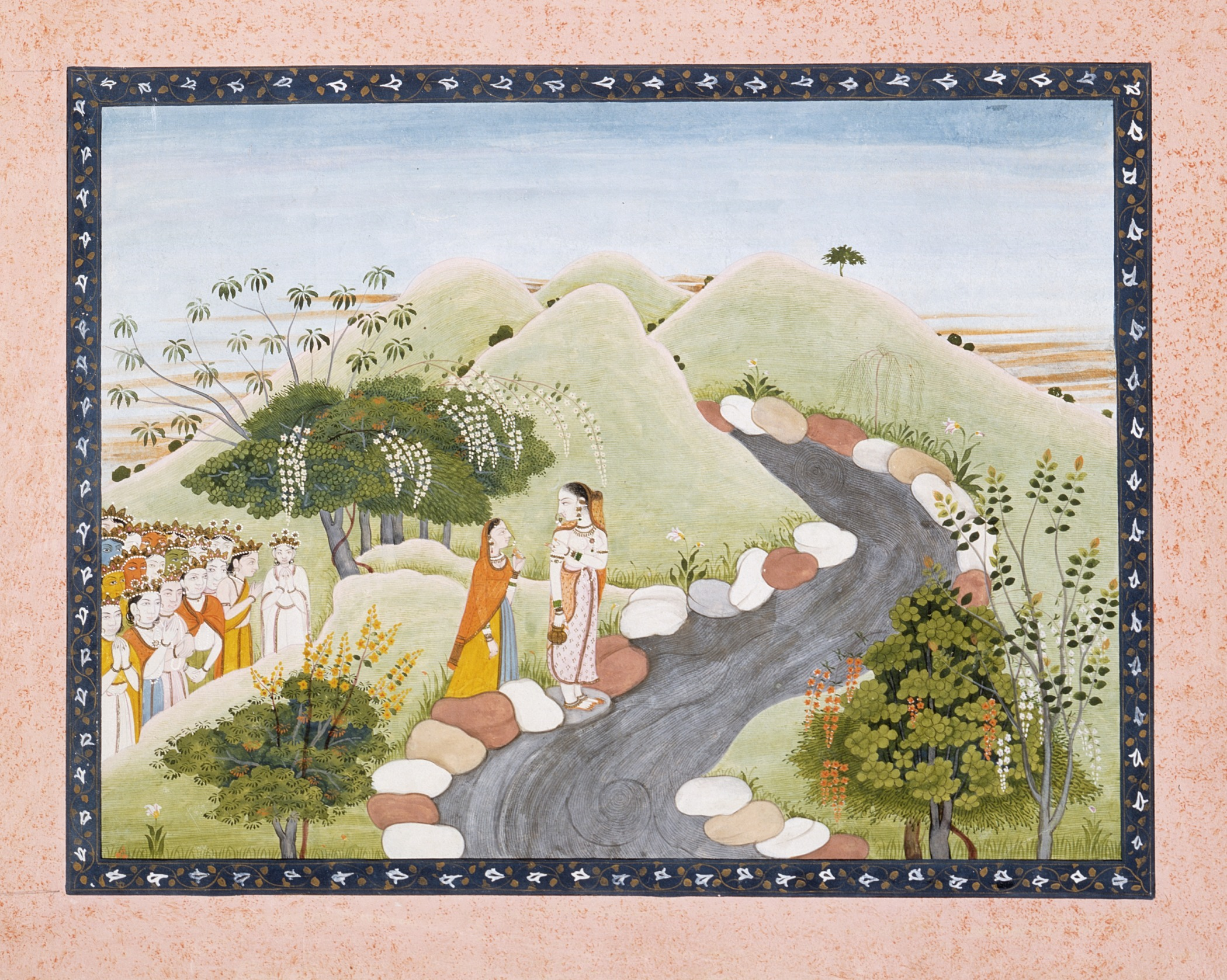
- The Emergence of Kaushiki, Folio from a Devimahatmya, from Guler, Himachal Pradesh, circa 1750 or earlier Drawings; watercolors
- Other names: Ambika, Chandi, Durga, Mahadevi, Adi Parashakti, Jagadamba
- Affiliation: Durga, Mahadevi, Parvati, Matangi, Navadurga, Matrikas, Mahavidyas
- Mantra: Oṃ Kauśikyai Namah
- Weapon: Trishula, Bell, bow and arrow, Plough, Pestle, Shanka, Sudarshana Chakra
- Mount: Lion
- Texts: Markandeya Purana, Devi Bhagavata Purana, Lakshmi Tantra Devi Mahatmya,
- Gender: Female
- Festivals: Navaratri

Kaushiki (Sanskrit: कौशिकी, romanized: Kauśikī, lit. 'woman of the cell',) is a Hindu goddess, a deity who emerged from the sheath of Parvati. She is primarily a form of the mother goddess Durga. She emerged from Parvati's cells to defeat the asura brothers Shumbha and Nishumbha, and was also the reason the Matrikas come into existence.

== Legends ==
=== Puranas ===
The story of Kaushiki is described in Devi Mahatmyam of Markandeya Purana. According to the Devi Mahatmyam of the Markandeya Purana, the gods went to Himalayas and requested the goddess Parvati to destroy the demon brothers Shumbha and Nishumbha, whereupon Parvati appears and asks for whom their hymn is intended. Suddenly a dark, fierce goddess named Kaushiki emerges from her sheath (kosha), while Parvati thereafter was known as Gauri.

Goddess Kaushiki is also known as Ambika or Mahasaraswati. She is often depicted bearing eight hands. She is also depicted carrying weapons like Trishula, Bell, Bow, Plough and Pestle. She is the slayer of the demon brothers Shumbha and Nishumbha, and is also the reason the Matrikas came into existence.

The generals Chanda and Munda caught a glimpse of Kaushiki and told Shumbha about her. With the help of the Matrikas, who were the feminine forms of the Trimurti consisting of Brahmani, Vaishnavi, and Maheshwari, also Varahi, Narasimhi, Shakti and her dark form Chamunda (Kali) Kaushiki and her forces fought the asuras in a pitched battle in order to vanquish them and restore the natural order.

Devi Bhagavata Purana describes Kaushiki as the Shakti that came out from the body of Goddess Parvati, and she is called 'Kaushiki' in the beginning of Devi Bhagavata Purana. the Linga Purana describes her as the daughter of yashoda.

"Janārdana, the Supreme Being together with Halāyudha (Balarāma), shone with the radiance of pure silver. As a result of Bhrigu's curse, He accepted the human form, and thus Janārdana was born of Devakī through Vasudeva. From the body of Umā arose the goddess Yoganidrā, known as Kauśikī. By the divine command (niyoga) of the Lord of lords, she born the daughter of Yaśodā. She is verily Prakṛti herself, directly worshiped by all the devas; while the Puruṣa, Bhagavān Kṛṣṇa, is He who bestows the fruits of Dharma and Mokṣa."
— Linga Purana, Pūrvabhāga 70

=== Devi Mahatmya Appendices ===
According to the Prādhānikam Rahasyam (The Secret Pertaining to Primordial Matters), the supreme sovereign Mahalakshmi created Mahasarasvati who is Kaushiki from her pure Sattva nature. Mahasarasvati, in turn, created a male-female pair which included the white-complexioned goddess Gauri.

Following this lineage, the Vaikṛtikam Rahasyam states that the goddess who was later born from the body of Gauri to destroy the demons Shumbha and Nishumbha is an incarnation of this same Sarasvati. The eight-armed manifestation, she is described as wielding an arrow, a pestle, a spear, a discus, a conch, a bell, a ploughshare, and a bow.

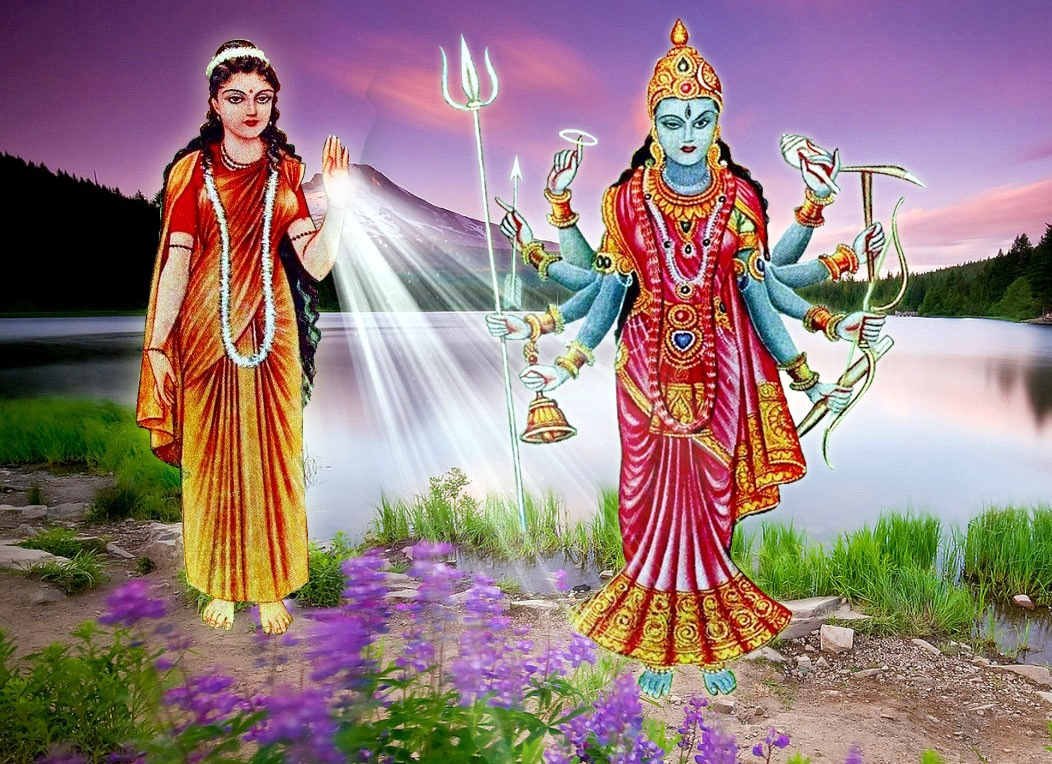
Kaushiki emerges from Parvati

=== Shaiva Agamas ===
The Ajitāgama describes Brahmā presenting the newly manifested Kauśikī, emphasizing her equivalence to the supreme deities:

Brahma says to Uma:
"This dark complexion that has come out of your sheath is endowed with your supreme power. O devī, know this goddess as Kauśikī who is seated on a lion and revere her as you revere Hara."
Saying so, Brahmā placed the goddess in Pārvatī's hands and then she (Kauśikī) manifested her śakti and various weapons.
— Ajitāgama, Kriyāpāda 53/7-8

=== Tantric texts ===
In the Rudrayāmala-Uttaratantra, Kaushiki is listed as one of the thousand names of Kumāri. According to the text, simply reciting these names brings spiritual rewards, even if a person does not perform formal rituals like puja or ritual bathing.

=== Pancharatra Agamas ===
In the Lakshmi Tantra (Chapter 9), a major Pancharatra text, Kauśikī is described as a Kevala-Avatāra, meaning a "separate descent" or independent incarnation of the goddess Lakshmi. The text explains that while Lakshmi is never truly separated from Vishnu, she occasionally manifests on her own to protect the world.

In this chapter, Lakshmi reveals to Indra that she is the supreme shakti who took the form of Kauśikī from Gauri to slay demons like Shumbha and Nishumbha:

O Sakra, during the period of Tamasa (Manu),
I, the supreme Mahavidya, was Kaushiki, who sprang from the body of Gauri
to slay all those notorious demons including Shumbha and Nishumbha.
Thereby I rescued the worlds and helped the gods.

O Indra, I am Kauśikī — the bestower of countless blessings.
When worshipped with devotion, I grant the treasure of omniscience.
The tale of my origin, my valor in battle, and my praise —
this triad is recited by the venerable Brāhmaṇas of old, masters of the Vedas and Vedāṅgas.

– Lakshmi Tantra 9/20-27

== In Jainism ==
In Jainism, Kauśikī (or Kauśikīvidyā) is the name of one of the sixteen Vidyās. According to the Jain text Trishashtishalakapurushacaritra by Hemachandra, this power is associated with a specific group of supernatural beings known as the Kauśikīpūrvaka Vidyadharas. The text states that these beings will instantly lose their magical abilities if they disrespect Jain teachers (Jinas), harm ascetics, or commit severe crimes.

== See also ==
- Chamunda
- Bhramari
- Shumbha and Nishumbha
