= Durga =

Major deity in Hinduism

- Mother Goddess; Goddess of Power, Strength, Protection, and Motherhood; Supreme Being (Para Brahman) in Shaktism
- Durga sculpture at the Durga temple, Aihole, 8th century CE
- Other names: Mahishasura-mardini; Kaushiki; Katyayani; Chandika; Ambika; Adi Parashakti; Bhavani; Jagdamba; Mahamaya
- Devanagari: दुर्गा
- Affiliation: Devi; Mahadevi; Mahakali; Parvati; Lakshmi; Navdurga
- Abode: Manidvipa; Vindhyachal
- Mantra: Oṃ Śrī Durgāyai Namaḥ; Oṃ Aiṃ Hrīṃ Klīṃ Cāmuṇḍāyai Vicce
- Weapon: Chakra (discus); Trishula (trident); Gada (mace); Bow and Arrow; Khanda (sword)
- Day: Tuesday, Friday and Saturday
- Mount: Lion; tiger
- Texts: Devīsūkta; Devi-Bhagavata Purana; Devi Mahatmya; Devīsūktam (Chandipatha); Kalika Purana; Lakshmi Tantra; Shakta Upanishads; Tantras
- Festivals: Durga Puja; Durga Ashtami; Navaratri; Vijayadashami; Diwali; Bathukamma; Dashain

Equivalents
- Manipuri: Panthoibi

Durga (/ˈdʊərɡə/; Sanskrit: दुर्गा, lit. 'The Inaccessible One, The Impenetrable One', IAST: Durgā [d̪urɡaː]) is one of the most important deities in Hinduism. She is widely worshipped by the followers of the goddess-centric sect, Shaktism, regarded as the principal aspect of Mahadevi, the Ultimate Reality in this sect. Durga has importance in other denominations like Shaivism and Vaishnavism.

She is associated with protection, strength, motherhood, destruction, and wars; her legends center around combating evils and demonic forces that threaten peace, dharma and cosmic order, representing the power of good over evil. Durga is seen as a motherly figure and often depicted as a warrior, riding a lion or tiger, with many arms, each carrying a weapon and defeating demons.

Durga is believed to have originated as an ancient goddess worshipped by indigenous mountain-dwellers of the Indian subcontinent, before being established in the main Hindu pantheon by the 4th century CE. The most important texts of Shaktism, Devi Mahatmya and Devi Bhagavata Purana, which revere Devi (the Goddess) as the primordial creator of the universe, the Brahman (ultimate truth and reality), and identify Durga as the embodiment of creation, preservation, destruction, maya (illusion), shakti (power or energy) and prakriti (nature). She is best known as Mahishasura-mardini; for slaying Mahishasura—the buffalo demon. In accounts of her battles with other demons such as Shumbha and Nishumbha, Durga manifests other warrior goddesses, the Matrikas, and Kali, to aid in combat.

In Vaishnava contexts, Durga is revered as Yoganidrā, the divine slumber, younger sister and a female version of Vishnu. Durga is typically portrayed as a celibate and independent warrior goddess. In later traditions, however, she became associated with Śiva. This association is not universal; Durga is not generally considered the consort of a male deity, except in a myth associated with Durga Puja in which Shiva is described as her consort. The Chandi likewise presents Durga as an independent, supreme goddess. In the regional traditions of Bengal, she takes on a maternal role and is considered the mother of Ganesha, Kartikeya, Lakshmi, and Sarasvati.

Durga has a significant following all over Nepal, India, Bangladesh and many other countries. She is mostly worshipped after spring and autumn harvests, especially during the festivals of Durga Puja, Durga Ashtami, Vijayadashami, Deepavali, and Navaratri. She is one of the five equivalent deities in Panchayatana puja of the Smarta tradition of Hinduism.

== Etymology and nomenclature ==
The word Durga (दुर्गा) literally means "impassable", "invincible, unassailable". It is related to the word Durg (दुर्ग) which means "fortress, something difficult to defeat or pass". According to Monier Monier-Williams, Durga is derived from the roots dur (difficult) and gam (pass, go through). According to Indologist Alain Daniélou, Durga means "beyond defeat".

The word Durga and related terms appear in the Vedic literature, such as in the Rigveda hymns 4.28, 5.34, 8.27, 8.47, 8.93 and 10.127, and in sections 10.1 and 12.4 of the Atharvaveda. (Note: It appears in Khila (appendix, supplementary) text to Rigveda 10.127, 4th Adhyaya, per J. Scheftelowitz.) A deity named Durge appears in section 10.1.7 of the Taittiriya Aranyaka. While the Vedic literature uses the word Durga, the description therein lacks the legendary details about her that is found in later Hindu literature.

The word is also found in ancient post-Vedic Sanskrit texts such as in section 2.451 of the Mahabharata and section 4.27.16 of the Ramayana. These usages are in different contexts. For example, Durg is the name of an Asura who had become invincible to gods, and Durga is the goddess who intervenes and slays him. Durga and its derivatives are found in sections 4.1.99 and 6.3.63 of the Ashtadhyayi by Pāṇini, the ancient Sanskrit grammarian, and in the commentary of Nirukta by Yaska.

=== Epithets ===
Durga is commonly known as Mahishasura-mardini for slaying the half-buffalo demon Mahishasura. She is also known as Vindhyavasini (she who dwells in the Vindhya Mountains). Her other epithets include Mahamoha (great delusion), Mahasuri (the great demoness), Tamasi (the great night, the night of delusion).

== Etymology and other names ==
There are many epithets for Durga in Shaktism. Her nine appellations (Navadurga) are: Shailaputri, Brahmacharini, Chandraghanta, Kushmanda, Skandamata, Katyayini, Kalaratri, Mahagauri and Siddhidatri. A list of 108 names of the goddess is recited in order to worship her and is popularly known as the "Ashtottarshat Namavali of Goddess Durga".

Other meanings may include: "the one who cannot be accessed easily", "the undefeatable goddess".

Durga is also known as Durgati Nashini, meaning one who eliminates suffering.

Other names for Durga include Chandika, Sharada, Ambika, and Vaishnavi.

== History and texts ==
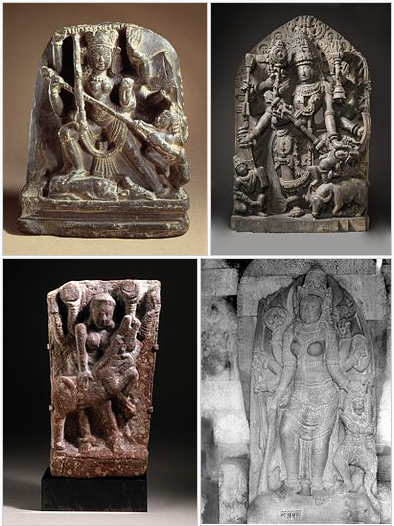
Artwork depicting the "Goddess Durga Slaying the Buffalo demon Mahishasura" scene of Devi Mahatmya, is found all over India, Nepal and southeast Asia. Clockwise from top: 9th-century Kashmir, 13th-century Karnataka, 9th century Prambanan Indonesia, 2nd-century Uttar Pradesh.

Evidence of Durga-like images can probably be traced back to the Indus Valley civilisation. According to Asko Parpola, a cylindrical seal from Kalibangan shows "a Durgā-like goddess of war, who is associated with the tiger".

Reverence for Devi, the feminine nature of God, first appears in the 10th Maṇḍala of Rig Veda, one of the scriptures of Hinduism. This hymn is also called the Devi Suktam hymn (abridged):

I am the Queen, the gatherer-up of treasures, most thoughtful, first of those who merit worship.
Thus gods have established me in many places with many homes to enter and abide in.
Through me alone all eat the food that feeds them, – each man who sees, breathes, hears the word outspoken.
They know it not, yet I reside in the essence of the Universe. Hear, one and all, the truth as I declare it.
I, verily, myself announce and utter the word that gods and men alike shall welcome.
I make the man I love exceedingly mighty, make him nourished, a sage, and one who knows Brahman.
I bend the bow for Rudra, that his arrow may strike, and slay the hater of devotion.
I rouse and order battle for the people, I created Earth and Heaven and reside as their Inner Controller.
On the world's summit I bring forth sky the Father: my home is in the waters, in the ocean as Mother.
Thence I pervade all existing creatures, as their Inner Supreme Self, and manifest them with my body.
I created all worlds at my will, without any higher being, and permeate and dwell within them.
The eternal and infinite consciousness is I, it is my greatness dwelling in everything.

– Devi Sukta, Rigveda 10.125.3 – 10.125.8,

Devi's epithets synonymous with Durga appear in Upanishadic literature, such as Kali in verse 1.2.4 of the Mundaka Upanishad dated to about the 5th century BCE. This single mention describes Kali as "terrible yet swift as thought", very red and smoky coloured manifestation of the divine with a fire-like flickering tongue, before the text begins presenting its thesis that one must seek self-knowledge and the knowledge of the eternal Brahman.

Durga, in her various forms, appears as an independent deity in the Epics period of ancient India, that is the centuries around the start of the common era. Both Yudhisthira and Arjuna characters of the Mahabharata invoke hymns to Durga. She appears in Harivamsa in the form of Vishnu's eulogy, and in Pradyumna prayer. Various Puranas from the early to late 1st millennium CE dedicate chapters of inconsistent legends associated with Durga. Of these, the Markandeya Purana and the Devi-Bhagavata Purana are the most significant texts on Durga. The Devi Upanishad and other Shakta Upanishads, mostly dated to have been composed in or after the 9th century, present the philosophical and mystical speculations related to Durga as Devi and other epithets, identifying her to be the same as the Brahman and Atman (self, soul). The Skanda Purana, Shiva Purana and many others Puranas identifies Durga as the warrior form of the goddess Parvati. The Mahishasura Mardini Stotra by Adi Shankara was written in her praise.

Vishnu-centric Puranas identify Durga as Vishnu's māyā". In Vishnu Purana and Bhagavata Purana, Durga facilitates the birth of Vishnu's avatar Krishna. the Narada Purana, Durga is associated as a form of Lakshmi. In the Garuda Purana and the Vishnu Purana, Lakshmi is considered Prakriti (Mahalakshmi) and is identified with three forms — Sri, Bhu and Durga. In Pancharatra texts such as the Lakshmi Tantra, Lakshmi has Durga as one of her forms and acquires the name Durga after killing the demon Durgamasura.

Origins

The historian Ramaprasad Chanda stated in 1916 that Durga evolved over time in the Indian subcontinent. A primitive form of Durga, according to Chanda, was the result of "syncretism of a mountain-goddess worshipped by the dwellers of the Himalaya and the Vindhyas", a deity of the Abhiras conceptualised as a war-goddess. Durga then transformed into Kali as the personification of the all-destroying time, while aspects of her emerged as the primordial energy (Adya Sakti) integrated into the samsara (cycle of rebirths) concept and this idea was built on the foundation of the Vedic religion, mythology and philosophy.

Epigraphical evidence indicates that regardless of her origins, Durga is an ancient goddess. The 6th-century CE inscriptions in early Siddhamatrika script, such as at the Nagarjuni hill cave during the Maukhari era, already mention the legend of her victory over Mahishasura (buffalo-hybrid demon).

Durga as a demon-slaying goddess was likely well established by the time the classic Hindu text called Devi Mahatmya was composed, which scholars variously estimate to between 400 and 600 CE. The Devi Mahatmya and other mythologies describe the nature of demonic forces symbolised by Mahishasura as shape-shifting and adapting in nature, form and strategy to create difficulties and achieve their evil ends, while Durga calmly understands and counters the evil in order to achieve her solemn goals. (Note: In the Shakta tradition of Hinduism, many of the stories about obstacles and battles have been considered metaphors for the divine and demonic within each human being, with liberation being the state of self-understanding whereby a virtuous nature and society emerging victorious over the vicious.)

== Legends ==
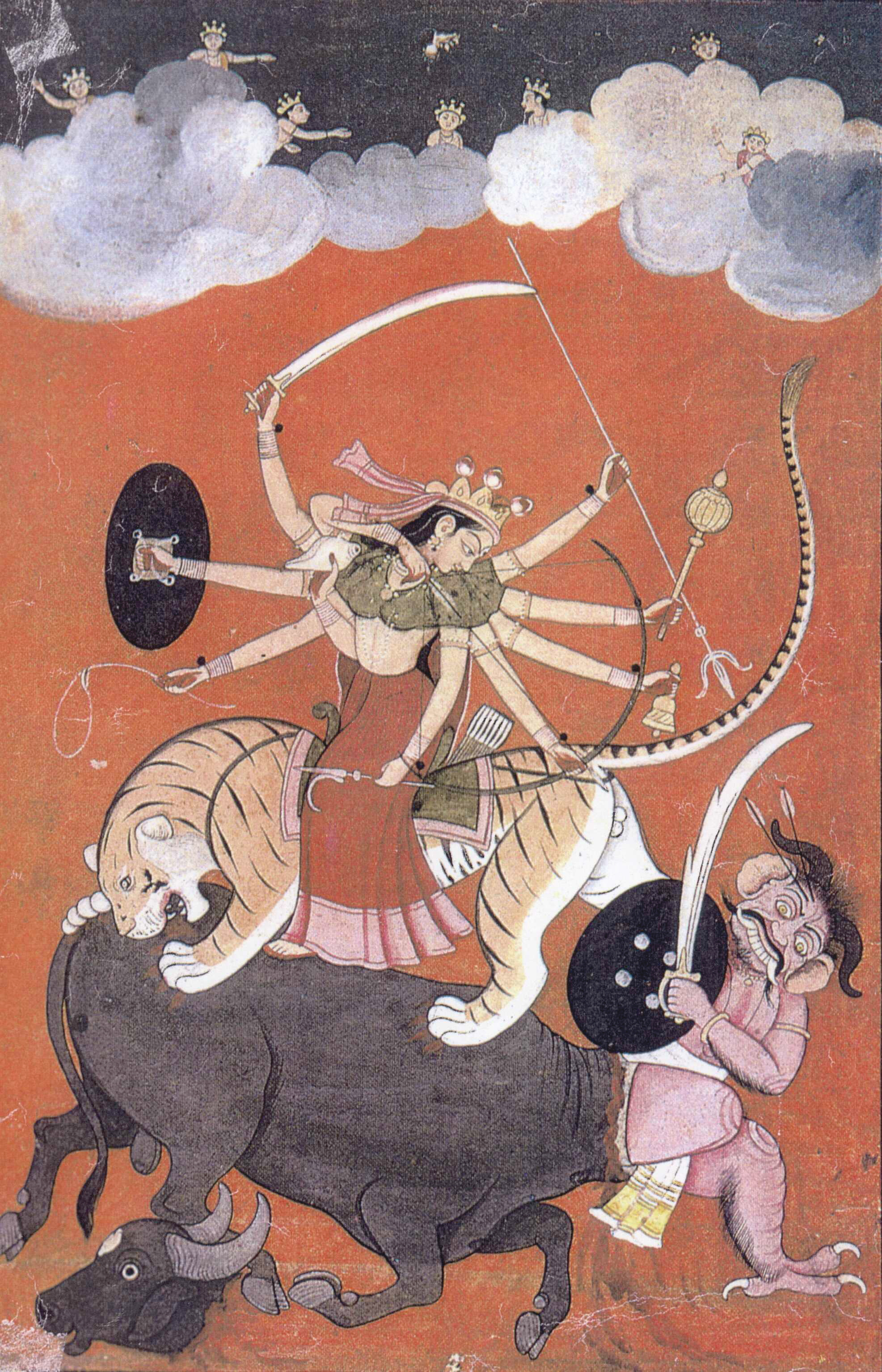
18th-century painting of Durga slaying the buffalo demon Mahishasura

The most popular legend associated with the goddess is of her killing of Mahishasura. Mahishasura was a half-buffalo demon who did severe penance in order to please Brahma, the creator. After several years, Brahma, pleased with his devotion, appeared before him. The demon opened his eyes and asked the god for immortality. Brahma refused, stating that all must die one day. Mahishasura then thought for a while and asked a boon that only a woman could be able to kill him. Brahma granted the boon and disappeared. Mahishasura started to torture innocent people. He captured Svarga and was not in any kind of fear, as he thought women to be powerless and weak. The devas were worried and they went to Trimurti. The Trimurti combined their power, and gave a physical form to the sum of their divine energy, Adi Shakti, a warrior woman with many arms. Himavan, the personification of the Himalayas, gifted a lion as her mount. Durga, on her lion, appeared before Mahishasura where the demon took on different forms and attacked the goddess. Each time, Durga would destroy his forms. At last, Durga slew Mahishasura with her trident when he was transforming as a buffalo demon.

According to Vaishnava tradition, Durga is among the various epithets and avatars of Yogamaya, the personification of the illusory power of Vishnu. Vishnu offers Durga the task of transferring the seventh child of Devaki into the womb of Rohini, as well as being born on earth as the infant daughter of Yashoda and Nanda, so that she could be swapped with Krishna. When Kamsa attempted to slay her, she manifested her true form of an eighteen-armed goddess, wearing a garland of lemons. The goddess announced that Kamsa's slayer had already been born, before vanishing. Durga is often conceptualised in this role as a sister of Vishnu.

== Attributes and iconography ==
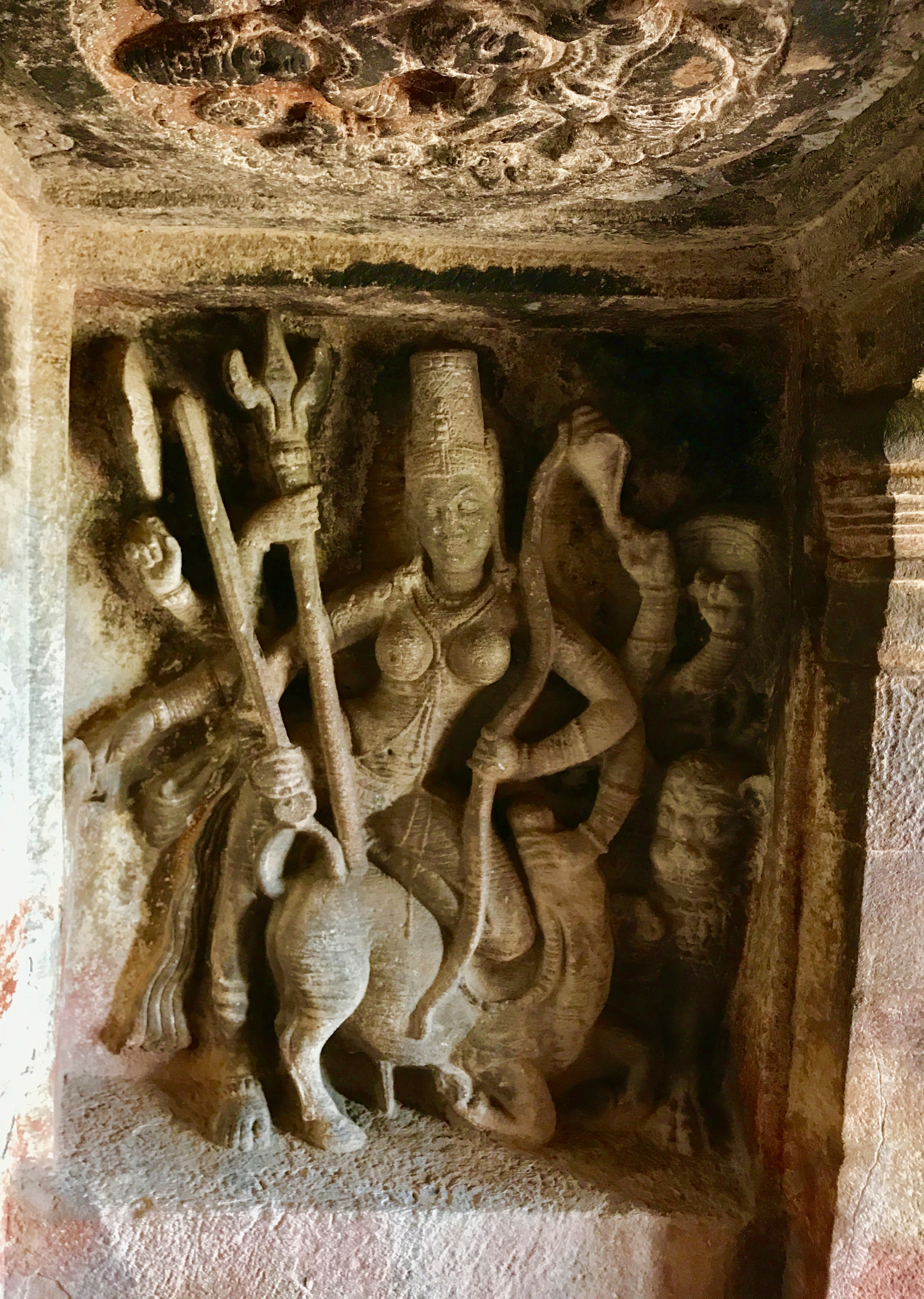
Left: Durga as buffalo-demon slayer from a 6th century Aihole Hindu temple, Karnataka; Right: in Mahabalipuram, Tamil Nadu.

Durga is a warrior goddess, and she is depicted to express her martial skills. Her iconography typically resonates with these attributes, where she rides a lion or a tiger, has between eight and eighteen hands, each holding a weapon to destroy and create. She is often shown in the midst of her war with Mahishasura, the buffalo demon, at the time she victoriously kills the demonic force. Her icon shows her in action, yet her face is calm and serene. In Hindu arts, this tranquil attribute of Durga's face is traditionally derived from the belief that she is protective and violent not because of her hatred, egotism or getting pleasure in violence, but because she acts out of necessity, for the love of the good, for liberation of those who depend on her, and a mark of the beginning of soul's journey to creative freedom.

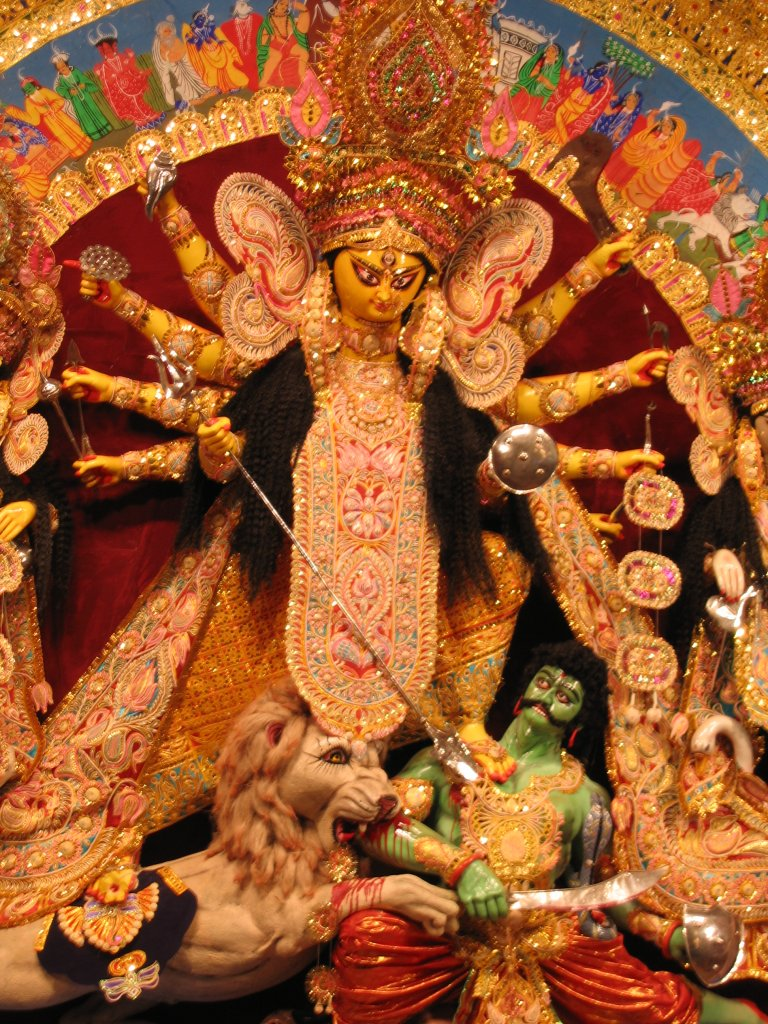
Durga killing Mahishasura in a Durga Puja celebration in Bengal

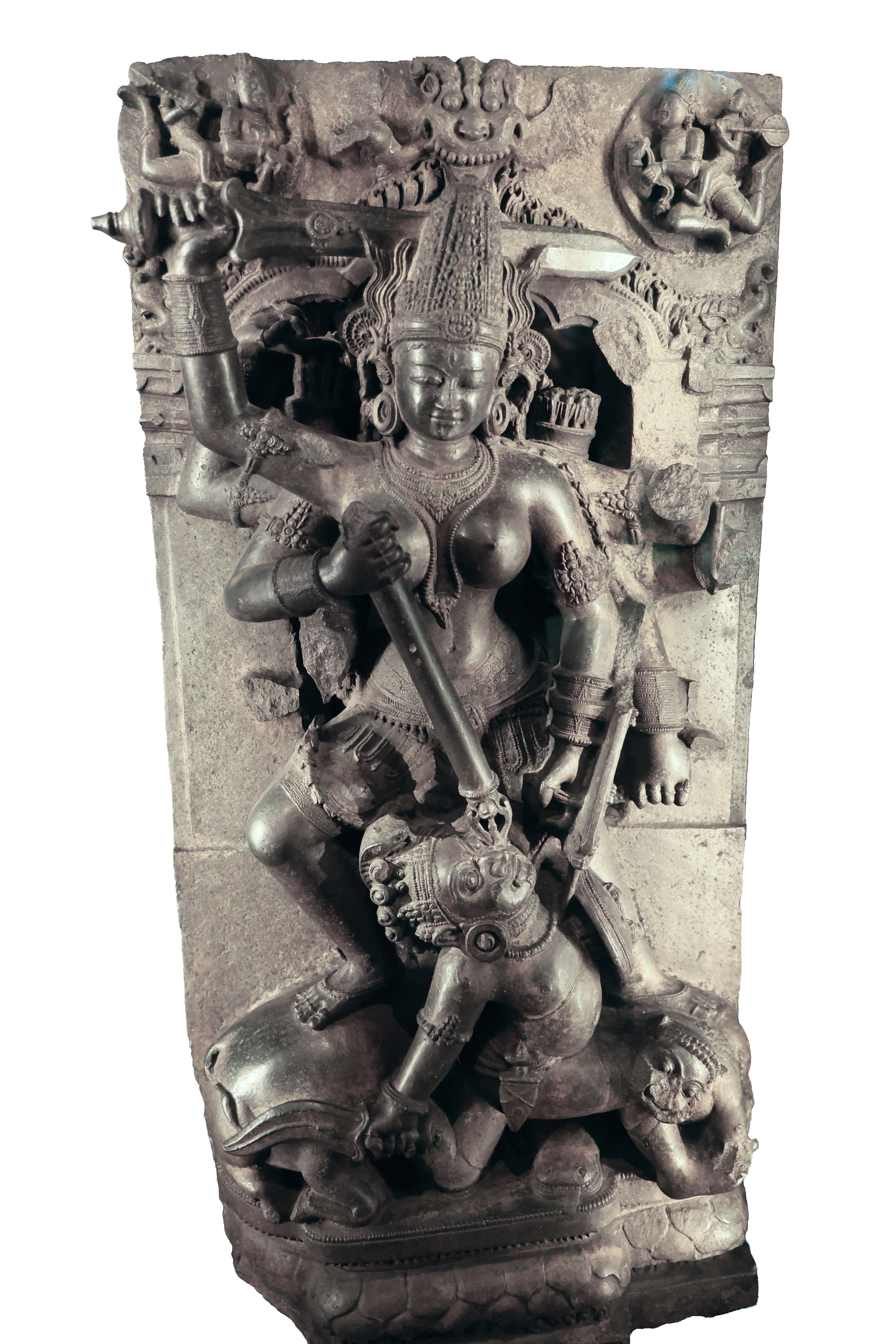
13th century stone sculpture in the British Museum

Durga traditionally holds the weapons of various male gods of Hindu mythology, which they give her to fight the evil forces because they feel that she is shakti (energy, power). These include the chakra (divine discus), conch, bow, arrow, sword, javelin, trishula trident, shield, mace, pink lotus flower, and noose. These weapons are considered symbolic by Shakta Hindus, representing self-discipline, selfless service to others, self-examination, prayer, devotion, remembering her mantras, cheerfulness and meditation. Durga herself is viewed as the "Self" within and the divine mother of all creation. She has been revered by warriors, blessing their new weapons. Durga iconography has been flexible in the Hindu traditions, where for example some intellectuals place a pen or other writing implements in her hand since they consider their stylus as their weapon.

Archeological discoveries suggest that these iconographic features of Durga became common throughout India by about the 4th century CE, states David Kinsley – a professor of religious studies specialising on Hindu goddesses. In the north wall of a granite cave in Mamallapuram, Tamil Nadu there is a large relief of Durga slaying Mahisasura, carved around 630–674 CE.

Durga iconography in some temples appears as part of Mahavidyas or Saptamatrkas (seven mothers considered forms of Durga). Her icons in major Hindu temples such as in Varanasi include relief artworks that show scenes from the Devi Mahatmya.

In Vaishnavism, Durga and her mount of a lion, is considered one of the three aspects or forms of Lakshmi, the other two being Sri and Bhu, in place of Niladevi. According to professor Tracy Pintchman, "When the Lord Vishnu created the gunas of prakriti, there arose Lakshmi in her three forms, Sri, Bhu and Durga. Sri consisted of sattva, Bhu as rajas and Durga as tamas".

Durga appears in Hindu traditions in numerous forms and names, but ultimately all these are different aspects and manifestations of one goddess. She is imagined to be terrifying and destructive when she has to be, but benevolent and nurturing when she needs to be. While anthropomorphic icons of her, such as those showing her riding a lion and holding weapons, are common, the Hindu traditions use aniconic forms and geometric designs (yantra) to remember and revere what she symbolises.

== Worship and festivals ==
Durga is worshipped in Hindu temples across India and Nepal by Shakta Hindus.

The Vedic Texts concluded Durga alone to be the Supreme and the Absolute facet of Brahman, as stated in the Devi-Atharvashirsha

यस्याः परतरं नास्ति सैषा दुर्गा प्रकीर्तिता॥२४॥

She who is renowned by the name "Durga" is the being superior to whom, no one exists.

– Devi Atharvashirsha Upanishad, 24.

Her temples, worship and festivals are particularly popular in eastern and northeastern parts of Indian subcontinent during Durga puja, Dashain and Navaratri.

=== Durga puja ===
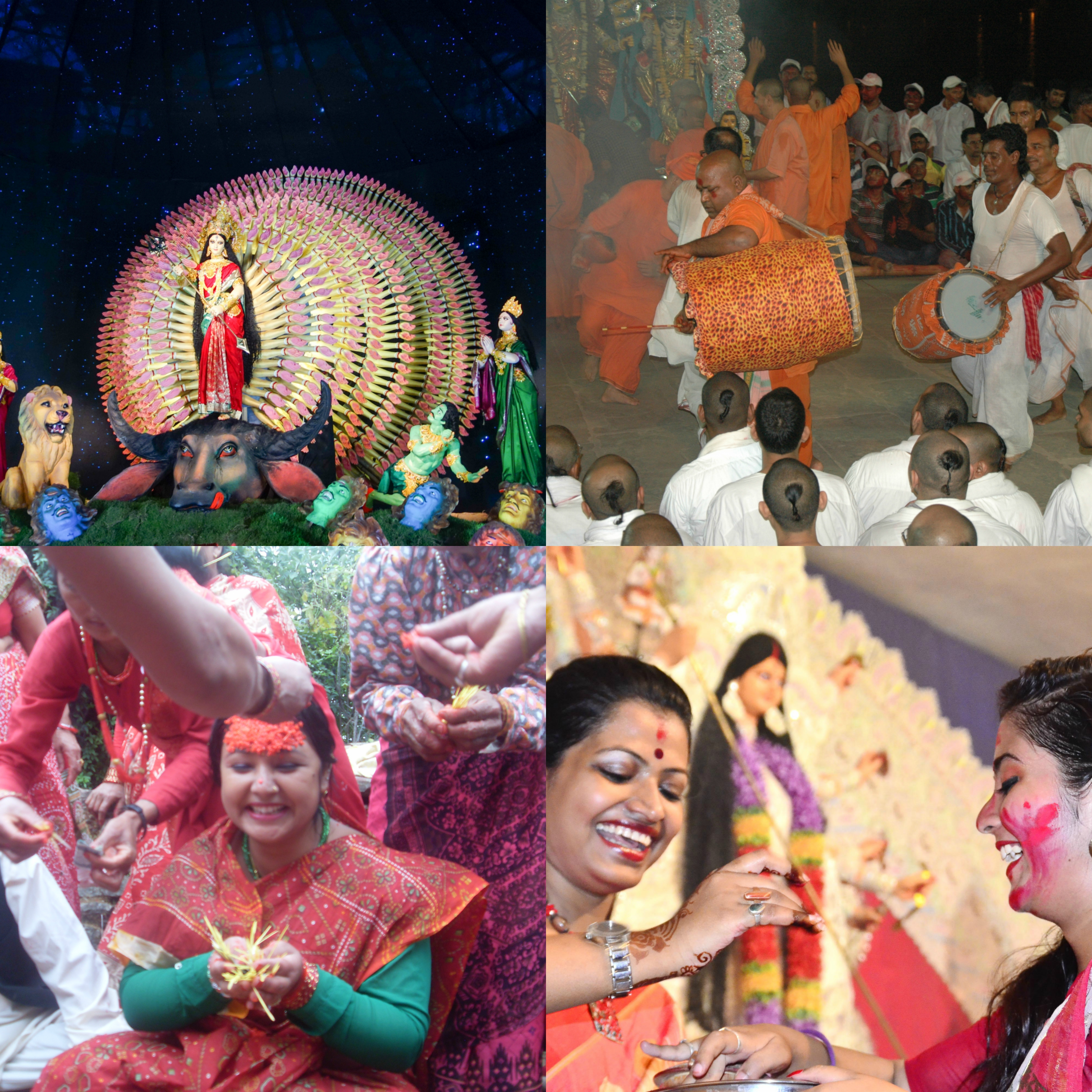
Durga festival images (clockwise from top): Durga Puja pandal with a Durga idol with 10 lakh hands standing on top a bull's head to symbolize her victory over Mahishasura in Kolkata, Dancing on Vijaya Dashami, women smearing each other with colour, and family get together for Dashain in Nepal.

As per the Markandeya Purana, Durga Puja can be performed either for 9 days or 4 days (last four in sequence). The four-day-long Durga Puja is a major annual festival in Bengal, Odisha, Assam, Jharkhand and Bihar. It is scheduled per the Hindu luni-solar calendar in the month of Ashvina, and typically falls in September or October. Since it is celebrated during Sharad (literally, season of weeds), it is called as Sharadiya Durga Puja or Akal-Bodhan to differentiate it from the one celebrated originally in spring. The festival is celebrated by communities by making special colourful images of Durga out of clay, recitations of Devi Mahatmya text, prayers and revelry for nine days, after which it is taken out in procession with singing and dancing, then immersed in water. The Durga puja is an occasion of major private and public festivities in the eastern and northeastern states of India.

The day of Durga's victory is celebrated as Vijayadashami (Bijoya in Bengali), Dashain (Nepali) or Dussehra (in Hindi) – these words literally mean "the victory on the Tenth (day)".

This festival is an old tradition of Hinduism, though it is unclear how and in which century the festival began. Surviving manuscripts from the 14th century provide guidelines for Durga puja, while historical records suggest royalty and wealthy families were sponsoring major Durga puja public festivities since at least the 16th century. The 11th or 12th century Jainism text Yasatilaka by Somadeva mentions a festival and annual dates dedicated to a warrior goddess, celebrated by the king and his armed forces, and the description mirrors attributes of a Durga puja.

The prominence of Durga puja increased during the British Raj in Bengal. After the Hindu reformists identified Durga with India, she became an icon for the Indian independence movement. The city of Kolkata is famous for Durga puja.

=== Dashain ===
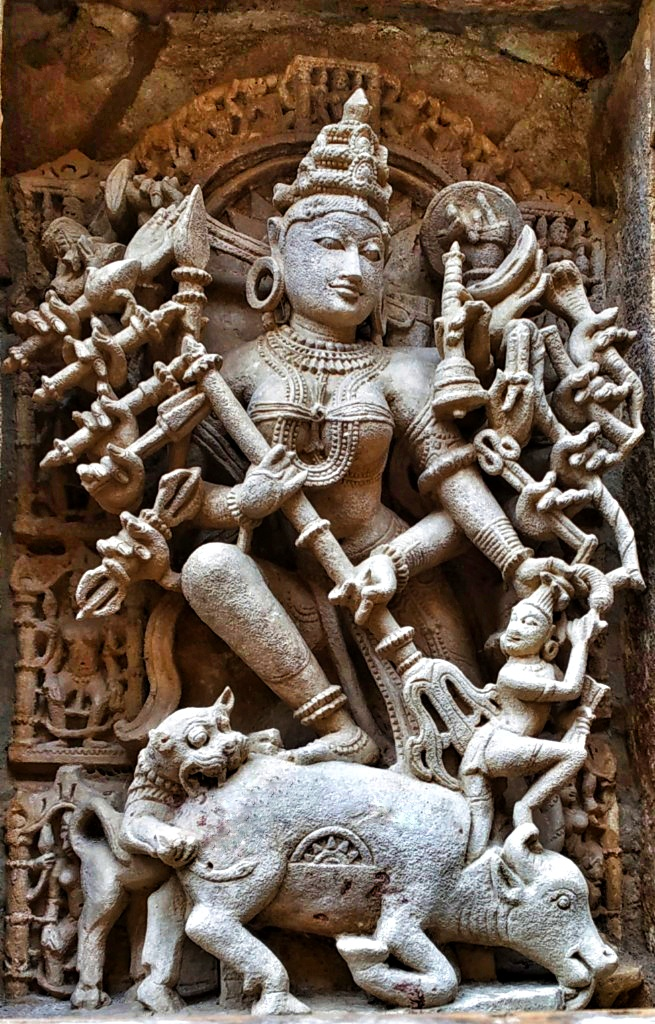
Durga killing Mahishasura, relief sculpture on Rani ki vav

In Nepal, the festival dedicated to Durga is called Dashain (sometimes spelled as Dasain), which literally means "the ten". Dashain is the longest national holiday of Nepal, and is a public holiday in Sikkim and Bhutan. During Dashain, Durga is worshipped in ten forms (Shailaputri, Brahmacharini, Chandraghanta, Kushmanda, Skandamata, Katyayani, Kalaratri, Mahagauri, Siddhidhatri and Durga) with one form for each day in Nepal. The festival includes animal sacrifice in some communities, as well as the purchase of new clothes and gift giving. Traditionally, the festival is celebrated over 15 days, the first nine-day are spent by the faithful by remembering Durga and her ideas, the tenth day marks Durga's victory over Mahisura, and the last five days celebrate the victory of good over evil.

During the first nine days, nine aspects of Durga known as Navadurga are meditated upon, one by one during the nine-day festival by devout Hindus. Durga is usually worshipped as a celibate and independent goddess. However, in some popular devotional practices—especially in Eastern India, such as in Bengal's Shakta folk traditions, she is venerated alongside Shiva, who is regarded as her consort. These traditions also include the worship of Lakshmi, Saraswati, Ganesha and Kartikeya, who are considered to be her children.

Some Shaktas worship Durga's symbolism and presence as Mother Nature. In South India, especially Andhra Pradesh, Dussera Navaratri is also celebrated and the goddess is dressed each day as a different Devi, all considered equivalent but another aspect of Durga.

=== Other cultures ===
In Bangladesh, the four-day-long Sharadiya Durga Puja is the most important religious festival for the Hindus and celebrated across the country with Vijayadashami being a national holiday. In Sri Lanka, Durga in the form of Vaishnavi, bearing Vishnu's iconographic symbolism is celebrated. This tradition has been continued by Sri Lankan diaspora.

== Outside Hinduism ==
=== In Buddhism ===
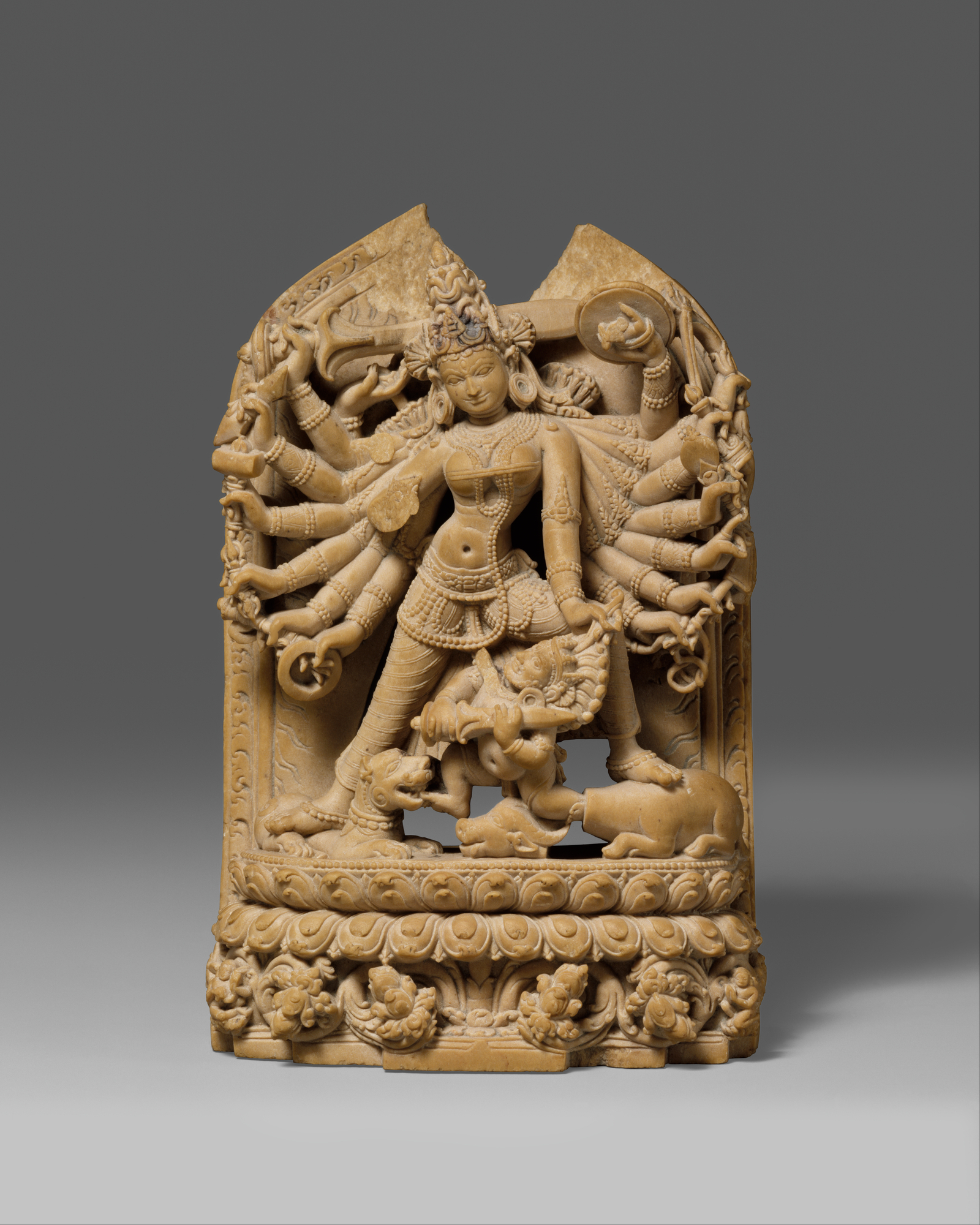
Durga statue from the Buddhist Pala Empire, in which Buddhism and Hinduism coexisted peacefully.

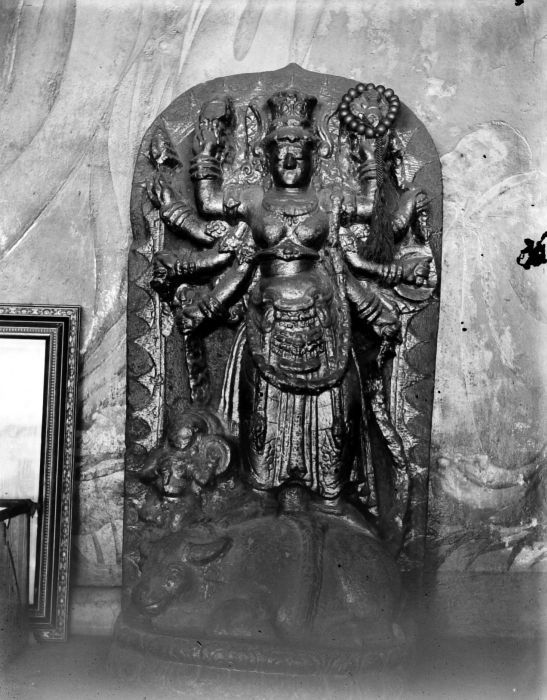
Image of Durga, interpreted as a form of Guanyin, in a Chinese temple in Surabaya, East Java, Indonesia. It resembles Chola art and likely pre-dates the Chinese community in East Java.

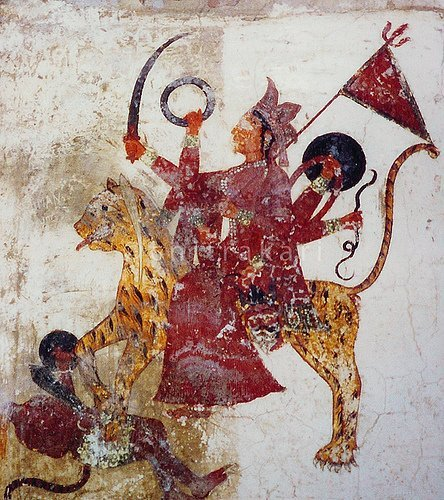
Mural of Durga crushing Mahikasur from the Guru Ram Rai Udasin Akhara located in Dehradun

The Tantric Buddhist Vajrayana traditions adopted several Hindu deities into its fold, including Durga. Numerous depictions of Durgā Mahiṣāsuramardinī (Durgā slaying the buffalo demon) have been found at Buddhist temple sites (c. 8th–11th century) in Afghanistan, Indonesia and northeastern India. Durga statues have also been found in major Buddhist sites like Nalanda and Vikramashila.

In Bengal, late Indian Mahayana Buddhists during the 17th century worshiped Durga during traditional Yogini Puja celebrations, and some traces of these Mahayana Durga rites survive today, even though the Bengalis who perform them are no longer Buddhist.

Images of the Buddhist Durga have also been found in Bali (surrounded with images of Buddhas and bodhisattvas) and date from the 10th and 11th centuries.

Durga also appears in the Sarvadurgatipariśodhana tantra, though in this text, she appears not in her demon slaying form, but mounted on a lion.

Several aspects of the popular Vajrayana Buddhist goddess Tārā are believed to have originated as a form of the goddess Durga or to have been influenced by Hindu stories of Durga, including Tara's fierce forms. One form of Tara is even called Durgottāriṇī-tārā who specializes in saving devotees from evil and rides a lion mount, the traditional mount of Durga. Durgottāriṇī appears in the Sādhanamālā (237.10; 237.21; 238.4).

In Nepalese Buddhism, the Buddhist tantric goddess Vajrayogini is "often worshiped interchangeably with Durga" during Durga festivals. Newar Buddhists also worship Durgottāriṇī-tārā during some of their Prajñāpāramitā rituals.

In Japanese Buddhism, the deity Cundī, also known as Butsu-mo (仏母, sometimes called Koti-sri), shares many features with Durga, and some scholars have the two deities as related. However, as Gimello notes, they are not the same deity, though they are often confused.

Likewise, in Tibetan Buddhism, the goddess Palden Lhamo also has similar features to the protective and fierce Durga.

=== In Jainism ===
The Sacciya mata found in major medieval era Jain temples mirrors Durga, and she has been identified by Jainism scholars to be the same or sharing a more ancient common lineage. In the Ellora Caves, the Jain temples feature Durga with her lion mount. However, she is not shown as killing the buffalo demon in the Jain cave, but she is presented as a peaceful deity.

=== In Sikhism ===
Durga is exalted as a creation of the divine in Dasam Granth, a sacred text of Sikhism that is traditionally attributed to Guru Gobind Singh.

According to Eleanor Nesbitt, this view has been challenged by Sikhs who consider Sikhism to be monotheistic, who hold that a feminine form of the Supreme and a reverence for the Goddess is "unmistakably of Hindu character".

== Outside the Indian subcontinent ==
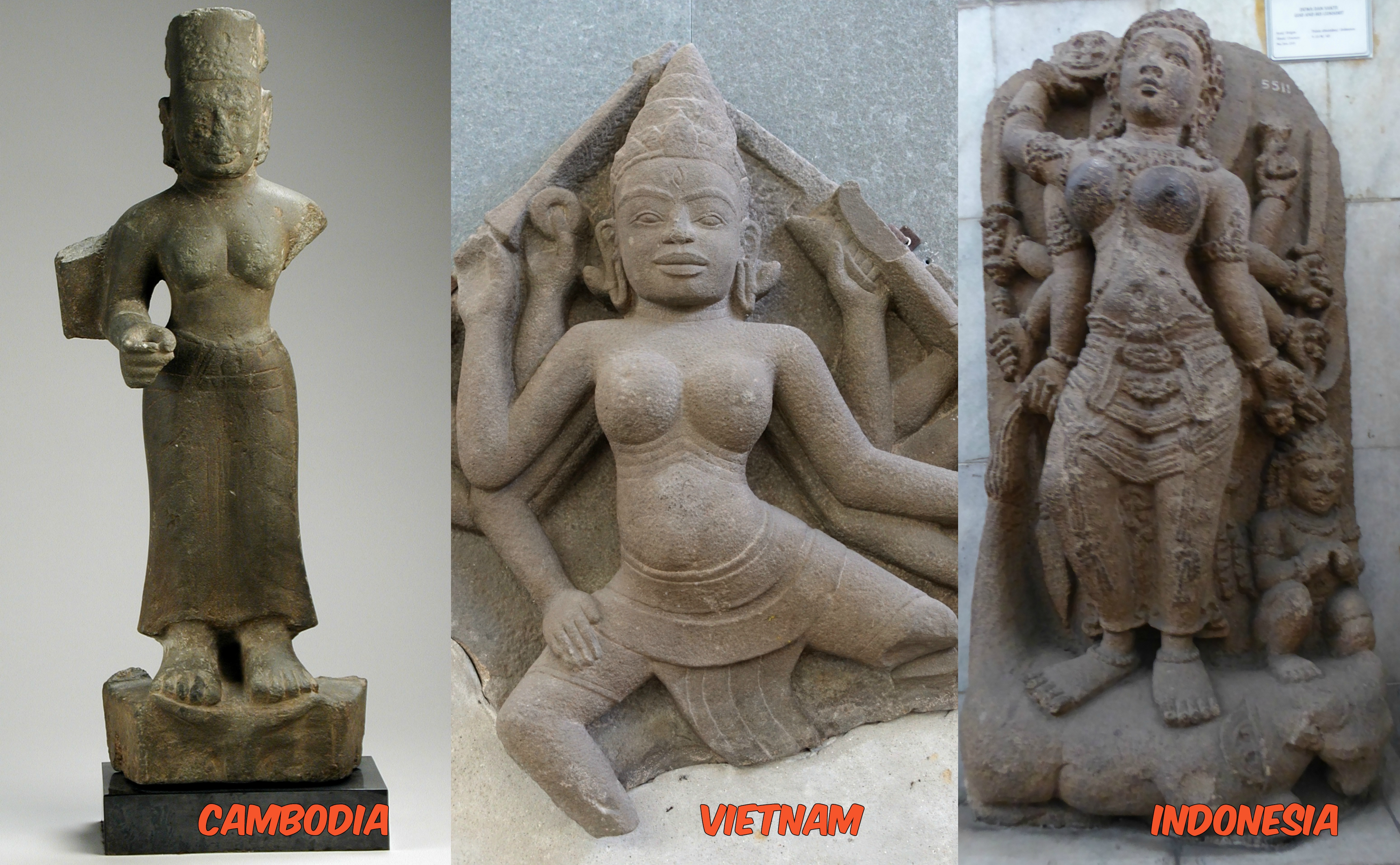
Goddess Durga in Southeast Asia, from left: 7th/8th century Cambodia, 10/11th century Vietnam, 8th/9th century Indonesia.

Archeological site excavations in Indonesia, particularly on the island of Java, have yielded numerous statues of Durga. These have been dated to be from the 6th century onwards. Of the numerous early to mid medieval era Hindu deity stone statues uncovered on Indonesian islands, at least 135 statues are of Durga. In parts of Java, she is known as Loro Jonggrang (literally, "slender maiden").

In Cambodia, during its era of Hindu kings, Durga was popular and numerous sculptures of her have been found. However, most differ from the Indian representation in one detail. The Cambodian Durga iconography shows her standing on top of the cut buffalo demon head.

Durga statues have been discovered at stone temples and archaeological sites in Vietnam, likely related to Champa or Cham dynasty era.

== Influence ==
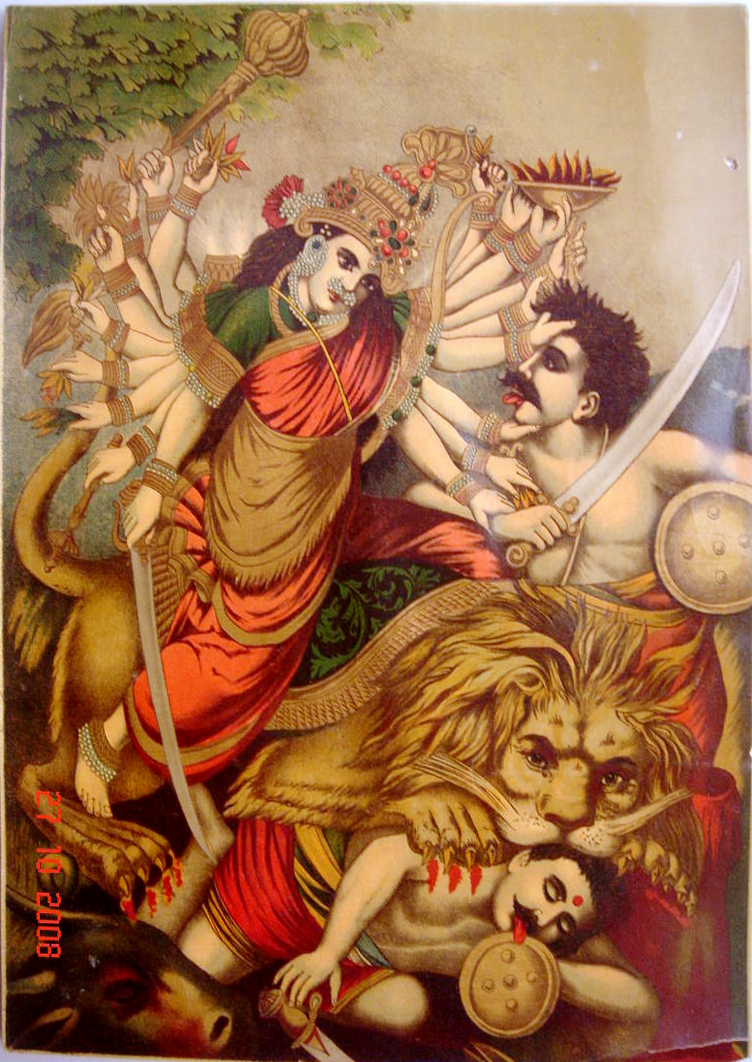
Durga slaying Mahishasura, painting by Ravi Varma Press

Durga as the mother goddess is the inspiration behind the song Vande Mataram, written by Bankim Chandra Chatterjee, during the Indian independence movement, later the official national song of India. Durga is present in Indian nationalism where Bharat Mata i.e. Mother India is viewed as a form of Durga. This is completely secular and keeping in line with the ancient ideology of Durga as Mother and protector to Indians. She is present in pop culture and blockbuster Bollywood movies like Jai Santoshi Maa. The Indian Army uses Hindustani phrases like "Durga Mata ki Jai!" and "Kaali Mata ki Jai!". Any woman who takes up a cause to fight for goodness and justice is said to have the spirit of Durga in her.

== See also ==
- Devi
- Tridevi
- Devi Mahatmya
