= Devīsūkta =

Sukta

The Devīsūktam, also called the Aṃbhṛnīsūktam, is the 125th sūkta (hymn) occurring in the 10th mandala of the Rigveda. It was composed by the female seer Vāc Āmbhṛṇī, daughter of the sage Ambhṛṇa. In the present day, the sūkta is popularly chanted during the worship of the Devī (Universal Goddess in any form), in the daily rituals of temples, and also in various Vedic sacrificial ceremonies like iṣti, hōma, havana, etc. It is also chanted at the end of Devīmāhātmya. The hymn portrays the Feminine Divine as the supreme origin, creative energy, and ultimate deity. It conveys a profound, all-encompassing experience of the Self and highlights the ancient Vedic acknowledgment of women's enlightened consciousness. Furthermore, it introduces the notion of the Divine Feminine as an immanent creative force. The Vedic hymn is an important basis for Shaktism.

== Sequential Index ==
The proper sequential occurrence of Devīsūkta, in the Ṛgveda text is:

Maṇḍala: X; Anuvāka: X; Sūkta: CXXV; Aṣtaka: VIII; Adhyāya: VII; Varga: XI, XII

== Significance ==
The sūkta, in its apparent, general sense, is the proclamation by the Devī of her own power, glory, pervasiveness, and actions. The hymn depicts the Feminine Divine as the Ultimate Source, Creative Force, and Supreme Divinity. It portrays a mystical experience of the Self as pervasive, unlimited, and nonlocal. It underscores the early Vedic recognition of women's enlightened awareness and introduces the idea of the Divine Feminine as immanent, experienceable creative power.

The origins of Tantric Śaktism can be traced to the Vāgāmbhṛṇī Sūkta. This hymn depicts Vac as the Supreme Power, governing various deities such as Vasu, Soma, Tvasta, the Rudras, and the Adityas while also being the source of treasures, sustainer of natural forces, and bestower of favors. It encapsulates key monotheistic ideas, forming the basis of historical Sāktism.

Sāyaṇācārya, in his commentary, states that Vāgāmbhṛṇī, (Vāk, the daughter of Ṛṣi Aṃbhṛṇa) – a brahmaviduṣi (one who has realized Bṛahman) – has eulogized herself in this sūkta. Vāk, having dissolved her individuality – the ego – has hence identified herself with the Paramātman (Brahman who is none other than the Devī), the all-pervasive saccidānanda (the indivisible Existence-Knowledge-Bliss-Absolute), and thus with all the forms in the universe and the functionaries thereof, has praised herself.

Hence, she is the ṛṣikā of this sūkta and also the devatā.

== Recitation ==
An audio recording of the recitation of the Devīsūkta:

Devīsūkta
