= Chandi =

Goddess in Hinduism, a form of Durga

- The fiery destructive power of Shakti/Durga
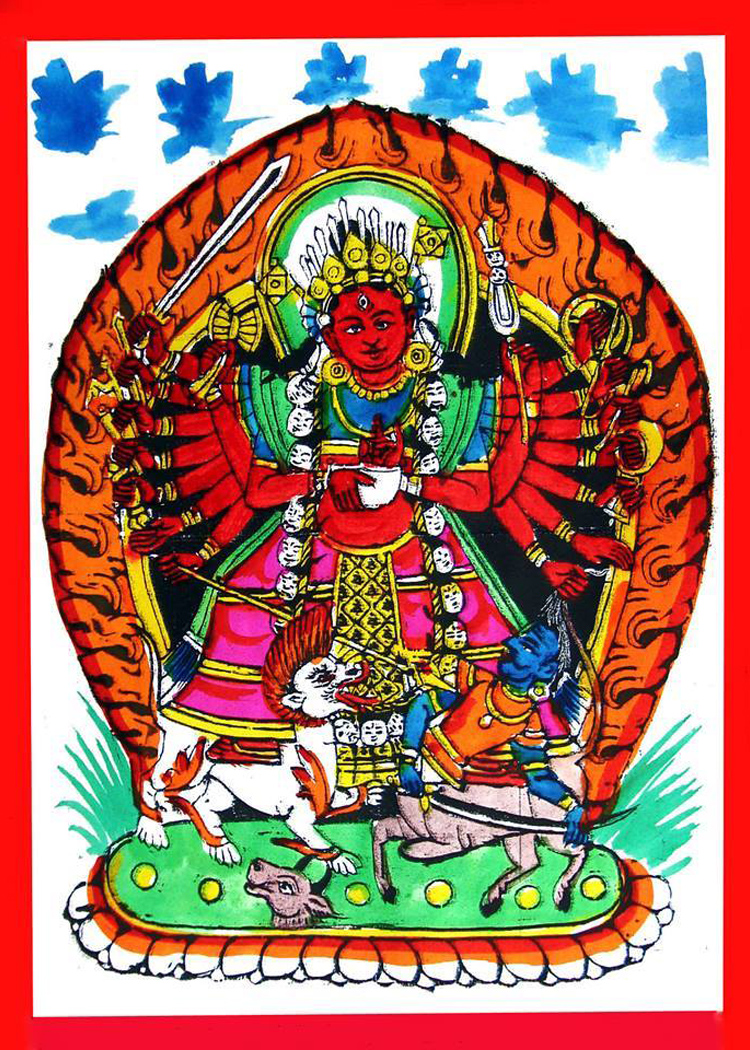
- Newari portrayal of Chandi
- Devanagari: चण्डी
- Sanskrit transliteration: Caṇḍī
- Affiliation: Form of Durga
- Mantra: Oṁ Namaś Caṇḍikāyai; Om Aim Hrīm Klīm Cāmuṇḍāyai Vicce
- Mount: Lion
- Consort: Shiva

Chandi (Sanskrit: चण्डी, IAST: Caṇḍī) or Chandika (IAST: Caṇḍika) ("the fierce") is a Hindu deity and a form of goddess Durga. She is invoked as the primordial feminine deity in Durga Saptashati. She first appears in the Devimahatyma and is a direct manifestation of Adi Shakti.

== History ==
In the Devī Māhātmya. Chandi represents the killer of Chanda. The Supreme Divine is often referred to as Caṇḍī or Caṇḍikā. This name is derived from the Sanskrit root caṇḍa, meaning “fierce” or “terrible.” Chandi is celebrated as the vanquisher of the demonic generals Chanda and Munda. According to Bhaskararaya, a prominent authority on Devi worship, Chandi embodies divine wrath and passion.

The epithet of Chandi or Chandika appears in the Devi Mahatmya, a text deeply rooted in the Shakta tradition of Hindus, Specially Eastern India. This region has long been a significant center for Goddess worship and tantric practices. Since ancient times, it is the most common epithet used for the Goddess. Within the Devi Mahatmya, Chandi, Chandika, Ambika, and Durga are often used interchangeably to refer to the Supreme Goddess in the sect.

Alongside the Sri Vidhya mantras, it is one of the principal mantras in Shakti worship. It is customary to chant this mantra when chanting the Devi Mahatmya. It is one of the primary mantras in the worship of Shakti. Traditionally, this mantra is chanted during recitations of the Devi Mahatmya. According to belief, the goddess resides in Mahakal, Kailasa. The city of Chandigarh, the joint capital of Punjab and Haryana, is named after the Goddess.

== Legends ==
Chandi is known as the supreme goddess Mahishasuramardini or Katyayini Durga (6th Navadurga) who slayed the demon Mahishasura. She has been affiliated with and also considered as Vindhyavasini or Kaushiki or Yogmaya or Ambika who killed Shumbha, Nishumbha and their fellow demons. "The great Goddess was born from the energies of the male divinities when the devas became impotent in the long-drawn-out battle with the asuras. All the energies of the Gods became united and became supernova, throwing out flames in all directions. Then that unique light, pervading the Three Worlds with its lustre, combined into one, and became a female form."

"Devi projected overwhelming omnipotence. The three-eyed goddess was adorned with the crescent moon. Her several arms held auspicious weapons and emblems. She wear precious jewels and dresses offered by the gods. With her golden body blazing with the splendour of a thousand suns, seated on her lion vehicle, Chandi is one of the most spectacular of all personifications of Cosmic energy."

In other scriptures, Chandi is portrayed as "assisting" Kali in her battle with the demon Raktabīja. Chandi wounded him, but a new demon sprang up from every drop of his blood that fell on the ground. By drinking Raktabīja's blood before it could reach the ground, Kali enabled her first to destroy the demon army and finally kill Raktabīja himself. In Skanda Purana, this story is retold and another story of Mahakali killing demons Chanda and Munda is added. Authors Chitralekha Singh and Prem Nath says, "Narada Purana describes the powerful forms of Lakshmi as Durga, Kali, Bhadrakali, Chandi, Maheshwari, Lakshmi, Vaishnavi and Andreye". Also, she is the one who purified Halahal (during Samudra Manthan) into Amrit (Ambrosio).

== Chandi Homa (Havan) ==
Chandi Homa is one of the most popular Homas in Hindu religion. It is performed across India during various festivals, especially during the Navaratri. Chandi Homa is performed by reciting verses from the Durga Sapthasathi and offering oblations into the sacrificial fire. It could also be accompanied by the Navakshari Mantra. Kumari Puja and Suvasini Puja also form a part of the ritual.

== Iconography ==
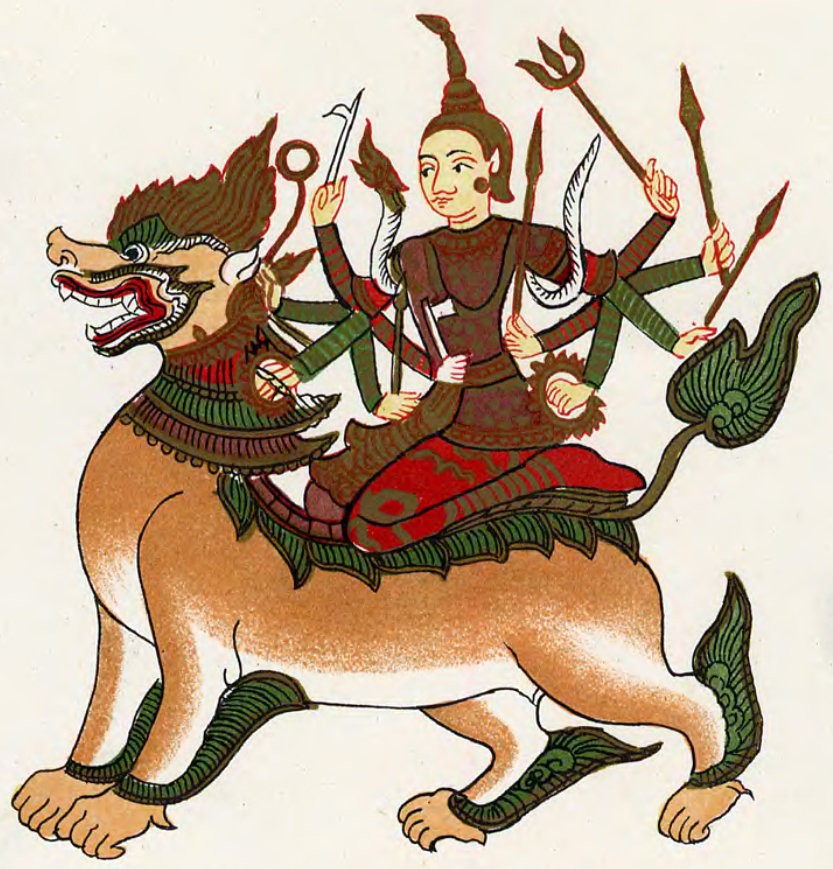
A Burmese portrayal of Chandi (Sandi Dewi)

The dhyana sloka preceding the middle episode of Devi Mahatmya the iconographic details are given. The goddess is described as having vermilion complexion, and eighteen arms holding a rosary, battle axe, mace, bow, arrow, thunderbolt, lotus, water-pot, pestle, spear, sword, shield, noose, bell, wine-cup, trident, conch and the discus (sudarsana). She has a complexion of coral and is seated on a lotus. In some temples the images of Maha Kali, Maha Lakshmi, and Maha Saraswati are kept separately. The Goddess is also portrayed as four armed in many temples.

== In folklore of Bengal ==
Chandi is one of the most popular goddess in Bengal, and a number of poems and literary compositions in Bengali called Chandi Mangala Kavyas were written from 13th century to early 19th century. These merged the local folk and tribal goddesses with mainstream Hinduism. The Mangal kavyas often associate Chandi with goddess Kali or Kalika and recognise her as a consort of Shiva and mother of Ganesha and Kartikeya, which are characteristics of goddesses like Parvati and Durga. The concept of Chandi as the supreme Goddess also underwent a change. The worship of the goddess became heterogeneous in nature.

Chandi is associated with good fortune. Her auspicious forms like Mangal Chandi, Sankat Mangal Chandi, Rana Chandi bestow joy, riches, children, good hunting and victory in battles while other forms like Olai Chandi cure diseases like cholera, plague and cattle diseases.

These are almost all village and tribal goddesses with the name of the village or tribe being added onto the name Chandi. The most important of these goddesses is Mongol Chandi who is worshipped in the entire state and also in Assam. Here the word "Mongol" means auspicious or benign.

== See also ==
- Chandi di Var (in Sikhism)
- Candi of Indonesia
