= Devi Mahatmya =

Major Hindu philosophical text

- देवी महात्म्य
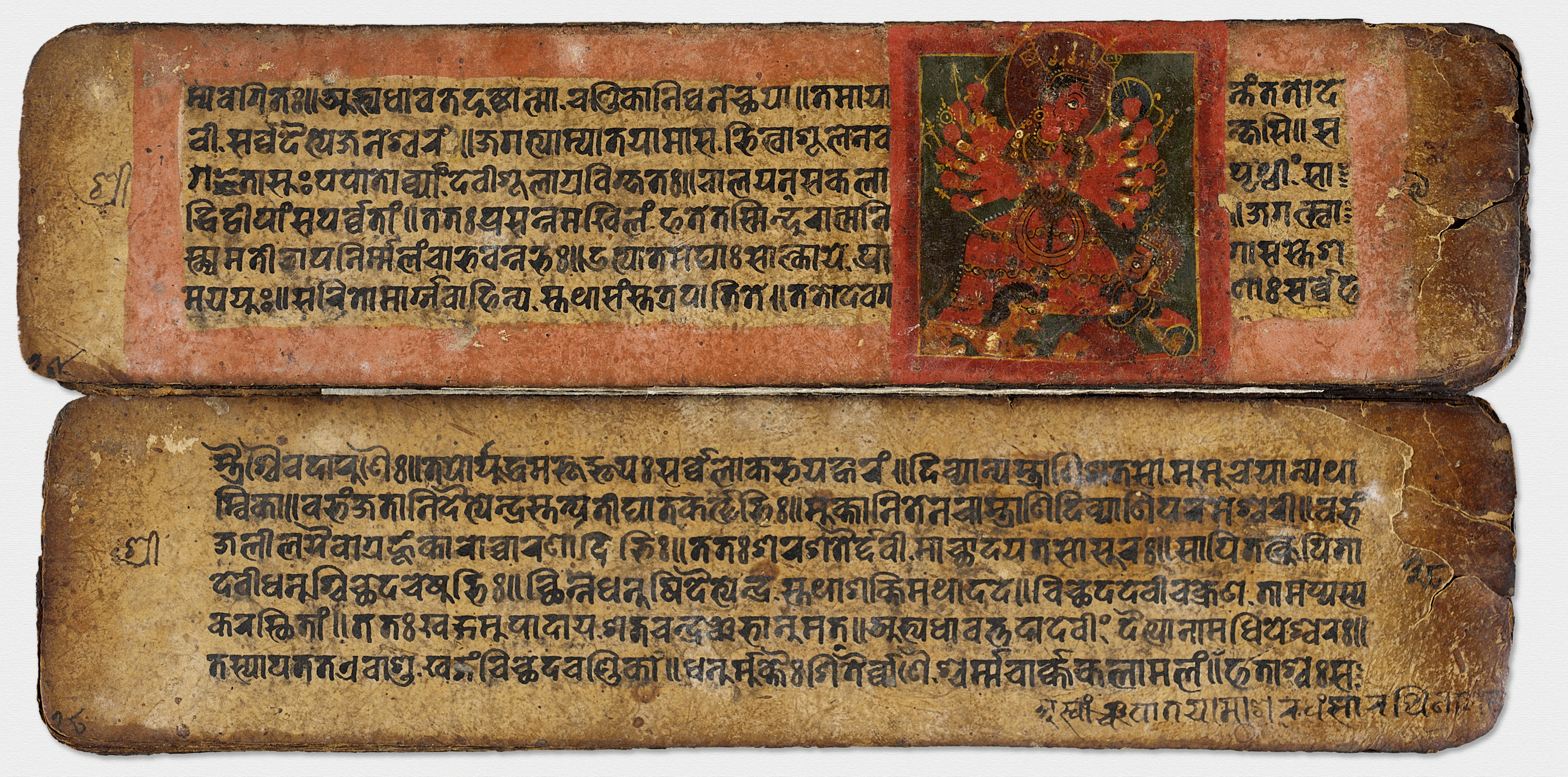
- A 17th-century Devimahatmya manuscript written in Newar script from Nepal

Information
- Religion: Hinduism
- Author: Vyasa
- Language: Sanskrit
- Chapters: 13
- Verses: 700

The Devi Mahatmya or Devi Mahatmyam (Sanskrit: देवीमाहात्म्यम्, romanized: devīmāhātmyam, lit. 'Glory of the Goddess') is a Hindu philosophical text describing the Goddess, known as Adi Parashakti or Durga, as the supreme divine ultimate reality and creator of the universe. It is part of the Mārkanḍeya Purāna (chapters 81 to 93).

The Devi Mahatmyam is also known as the Durgā Saptashatī (दुर्गासप्तशती), Śata Chandī (शत् चंडी) and Chandi Paṭh (चंडी पाठ). The text contains 700 verses that are arranged into 13 chapters. It is one of the most important texts in Shaktism, along with Devi-Bhagavata Purana and Devi Upanishad. The text is also one of the earliest extant complete manuscripts from the Hindu traditions which describes reverence and worship of the feminine aspect of God.

The Devi Mahatmyam describes a storied battle between good and evil in which Devi, manifesting as goddess Durga, leads the forces of good against the demon Mahishasura—the goddess is very angry and ruthless, and the forces of good win. The verses of this story also outline a philosophical foundation wherein the ultimate reality, Brahman in Hinduism, is the Divine Mother.

The Devi Mahatmyam is recited during Navaratri celebrations, the Durga Puja festival, and in Durga temples across India.

== Etymology ==
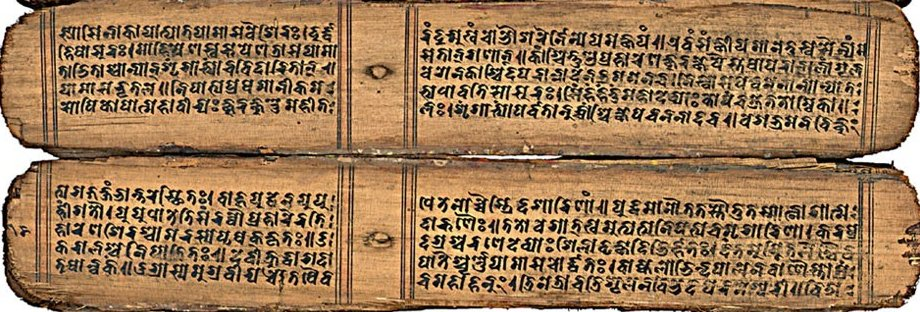
The oldest surviving manuscript of the Devi Māhātmyam, on palm-leaf, in an early Bhujimol or Newari script, Nepal, 11th century

Devi Mahatmyam means 'Glorification of the Goddess'. The text is also called Durga Saptaśati (literally a collection of seven hundred" or something that contains seven hundreds in number), as it contains 700 shlokas (verses).

It is also known as Candi Patha. Caṇḍī or Caṇḍika is the name by which the Supreme Goddess is referred to in Devī Māhātmyam. According to Hindu Scriptures, Caṇḍikā is "the Goddess of Truth and Justice who came to Earth for the establishment of Dharma", from the adjective caṇḍa, "fierce, violent, cruel for evil forces not for good forces". The epithet has no precedent in Vedic literature and is first found in a late insertion to the Mahabharata, where Chaṇḍa and Chaṇḍī appear as epithets."

== History ==
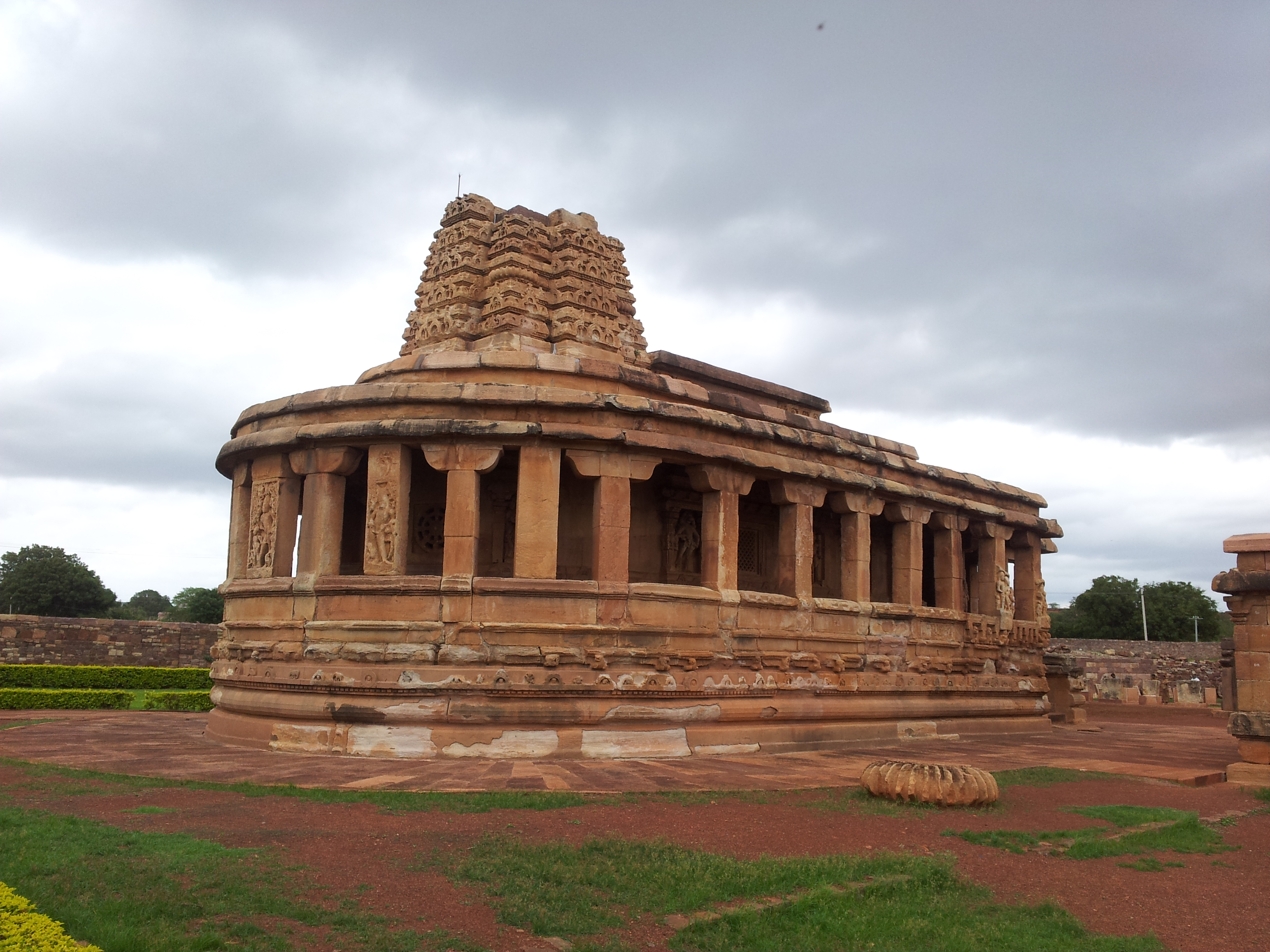
Durga temple depicting scenes from Devi Mahatmyam, in Aihole temple, is part of a UNESCO world heritage site candidate.

Devi Mahatmyam is a text extracted from Markandeya Purana, and constitutes the latter's chapters 81 through 93. The Purana is dated to the ~3rd century CE, and the Devi Mahatmyam was added to the Markandeya Purana either in the 5th or 6th century.

The Dadhimati Mata inscription (608 CE) quotes a portion from the Devi Mahatmyam. Thus, it can be concluded that the text was composed before the 7th century CE. It is generally dated between 400–600 CE. Wendy Doniger O'Flaherty dates the Devi Mahatmya to c. 550 CE, and the rest of the Markandeya Purana to c. 250 CE.

Hymns to goddesses are in the ancient Hindu epic Mahabharata, particularly in the later (100 to 300 CE) added Harivamsa section. Thomas Coburn states that the archaeological and textual evidence implies that the Goddess had become as much a part of the Hindu tradition as God by about the third or fourth century.

C. Mackenzie Brown states that the Devi Mahatmyam is both a culmination of centuries of Indian ideas about the divine feminine, as well as a foundation for the literature and spirituality focused on the feminine transcendence in centuries that followed.

== Philosophy ==
The Devi Mahatmya is a devotional text, and Thomas Coburn states that its aim is not to analyze divine forms or abstract ideas, but to praise. It accomplishes this with a philosophical foundation, wherein the female is the primordial being; she is also the Tridevi as the creator, the sustainer, and destroyer. She is described in the text as the one who dwells in all creatures, as the soul, as the power to know, will and act. She is further described as the consciousness of all living beings, intelligence, matter, and all that is form or emotion.

The text includes hymns to saguna (manifest, incarnated) form of the Goddess, as well as nirguna (unmanifest, abstract) form of her. The saguna hymns appear in chapters 1, 4 and 11 of the Devi Mahatmya, while chapter 5 praises the nirguna concept of Goddess. The saguna forms of her, asserts the text, are Mahakali (destroyer, desire principle of mother, Tamasika), Mahalakshmi (sustainer, evolution principle of mother, Trigunatmika and then Rajasika) and Mahasaraswati (creator, action principle of mother, Sattvika), which as a collective are called Tridevi. The Nirguna concept (Avyakta, transcendent) is also referred to as Mahalakshmi. This structure is not accidental, but embeds the Samkhya philosophy idea of three Gunas that is central in Hindu scriptures such as the Bhagavad Gita.

The Samkhya philosophical premise asserts that all life and matter has all three co-existent innate tendencies or attributes (Guṇa), whose equilibrium or disequilibrium drives the nature of a living being or thing. Tamasic is darkness and destructiveness, Sattvic is light and creative pursuit, and Rajasic is dynamic energy qua energy without any intent of being creative or destructive. The unmanifest, in this philosophy, has all these three innate attributes and qualities, as potent principle within, as unrealized power, and this unrealized Goddess dwells in every individual, according to Devi Mahatmya. This acknowledgment of Samkhya dualistic foundation is then integrated into a monistic (non-dualistic, Advaita) spirituality in Devi Mahatmya, just like the Upanishads, the Bhagavad Gita, the Bhagavata Purana and other important texts of Hinduism.

== Contents ==
The Goddess in Indian traditions

The Devi-Mahatmya is not the earliest literary fragment attesting to the existence of devotion to a goddess figure, but it is surely the earliest in which the object of worship is conceptualized as Goddess, with a capital G.

— Thomas Coburn

The Devi Mahatmya consists of chapters 81–93 of the Mārkandeya Purana, one of the early Sanskrit Puranas, where the sage Markandeya is narrating a story about Savarni Manu, or the eighth Manu. The thirteen chapters of Devi Mahatmya are divided into three unequal parts.

The framing narrative of Devi Mahatmya presents a dispossessed king Suratha, who has lost his kingdom and a merchant named Samadhi, who is betrayed by his family. Disturbed by these events, both men decide to renounce the world and escape to the forested ashram of sage Medhas to find peace. Medhas' teachings lead them both beyond existential suffering. The sage tells them about Mahamaya, an epithet of the goddess, who is the cause of world's delusion and creation and who manifests in different ways. Most famous is the story of Mahishasura Mardini – Devi as "Slayer of the Buffalo Demon" – one of the most ubiquitous images in Hindu art and sculpture, and a tale known almost universally in India. Among the important goddess forms the Devi Mahatmyam introduced into the Sanskritic mainstream are Kali and the Sapta-Matrika ("Seven Mothers").

=== First episode ===
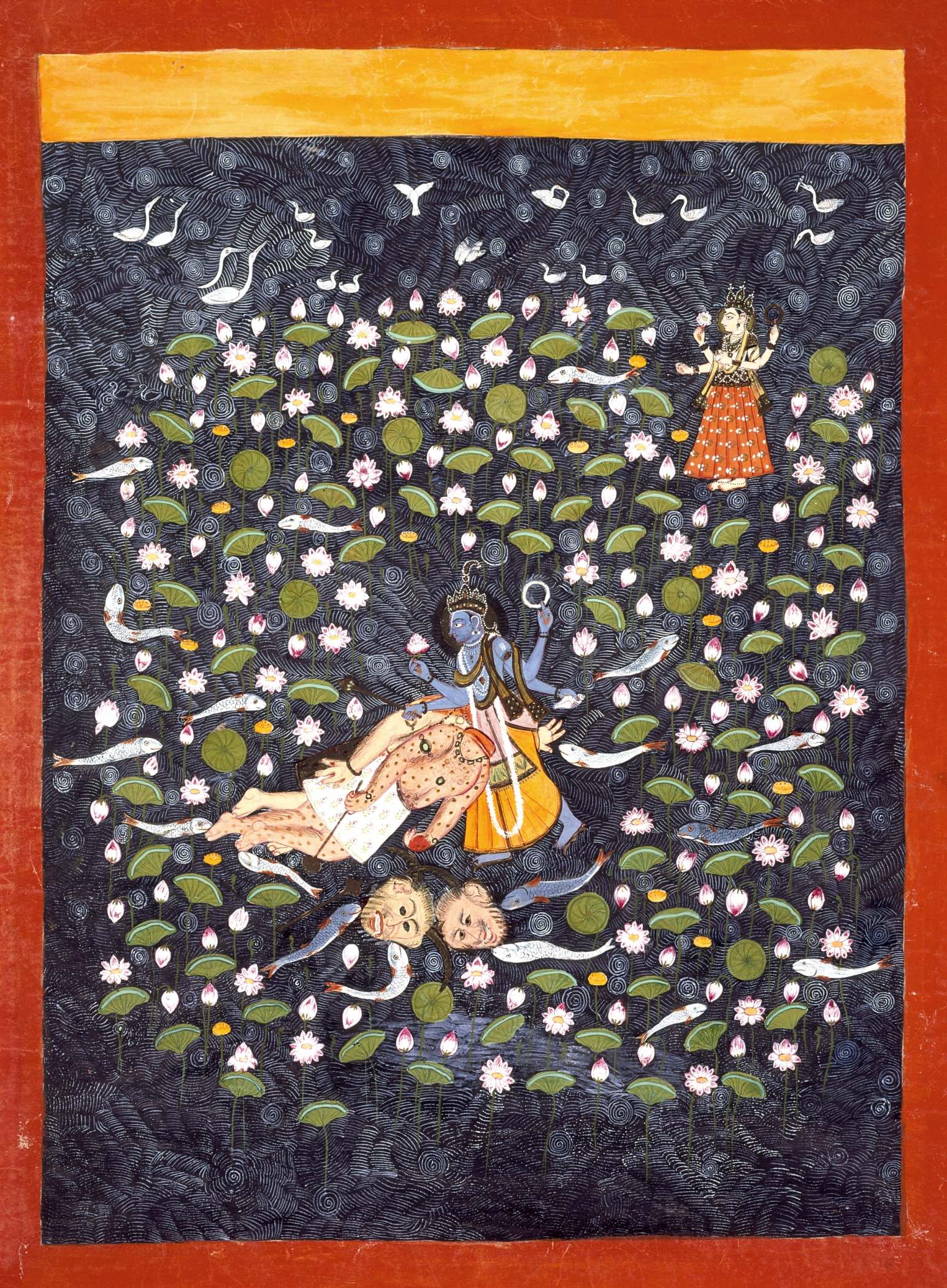
Vishnu vanquishes Madhu-Kaitabha, with Devi in the background.

The first episode (chapter 1) of the Devi Mahatmyam depicts Devi in her form as Maha-Maya. Here, Devi is central and key to the creation as Maha-Maya, or, the great illusion/power that induces Vishnu's deep slumber on the waters of the cosmic ocean prior to the manifestation of the Universe which is a continuous cycle of manifestation, destruction and re-manifestation. Two demons, Madhu-Kaitabha, arise from Vishnu's earwax. The demons endeavour to vanquish Brahma who is preparing to create the next cycle of the Universe. Brahma sings to the Great Goddess, asking her to withdraw from Vishnu so he may awaken and slay the demons. Devi agrees to withdraw and Vishnu awakens, fights the demons for five thousand years and vanquishes them. Here Devi is praised as the agent who allows both the cosmic order to be upset and restored.

=== Middle episode ===
The middle episode (chapters 2–4) presents the goddess in her avatar as Durga. The episode stages a world under attack by the shape-shifting Mahishasura, an evil demon who uses deception to disarm his opponents, ultimately taking the form of a buffalo demon. Mahishasura is able to use his powers to defeat the male gods because he had been granted a boon that he could only be defeated by a woman. Feeling angered and helpless, the gods release energy which combines into a singular mass of light and strength which takes the form of a goddess, Durga. The gods then bestow her with various weapons. Vishnu gives her his discus, Vayu gives her his bow and arrows and Himalaya provides her with a lion for a vehicle. Durga rides the lion into battle and captures and slays the buffalo demon by cutting off its head. She then destroys the inner essence of the demon when it emerges from the buffalo's severed neck, thereby establishing order in the world.

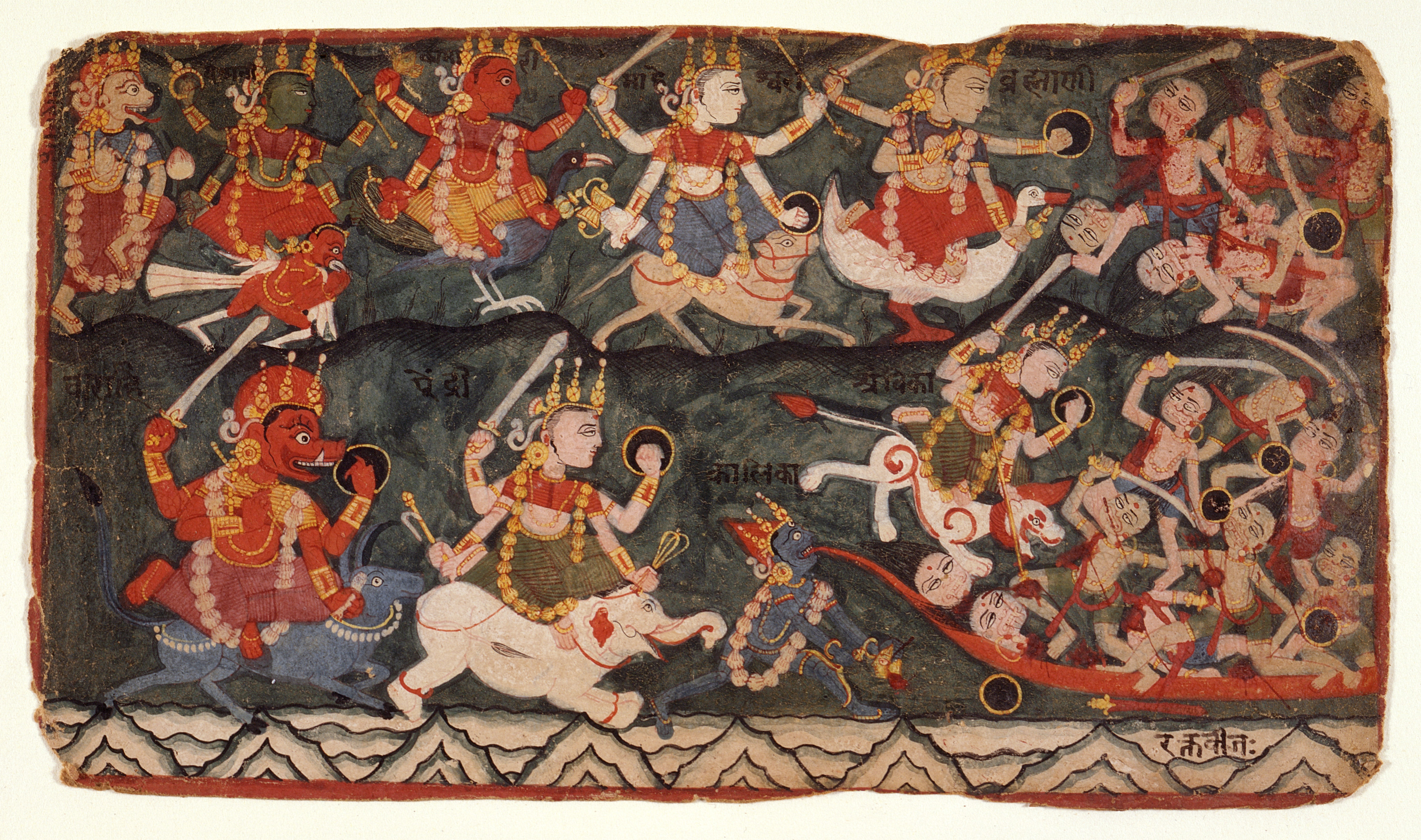
Ambika (goddess) and Eight Matrikas (top row, from the left) Narasinhmi, Vaishnavi, Kaumari, Maheshvari, Brahmani. (bottom row, from left) Varahi, Indrayani and Chamunda or Kali battle the demon Raktabīja, folio from the Devi Mahatmya

=== Final episode ===
In the final episode (chapters 5–13) the demons Shumbha and Nishumbha conquer heaven and the gods go to the Himalayas to pray to Devi. Soon, Parvati arrives and asks them to whom they are praying. She then reveals to them that it is her. Thereafter, Ambika, or Kaushiki, appears from the sheath (kosha) of Parvati’s body.

Devi engages in a fierce battle with Chanda and Munda, servants of Sumbha and Nisumbha. Chanda and Munda are eventually killed by Kali who emerges from Devi's forehead. The battle continues and the seven mothers, or the saptamatrika, are produced from the seven male gods.

The demon Raktabīja also appears and is killed by Kali. Nisumbha and his army is defeated by the goddess with the help of the seven mothers.

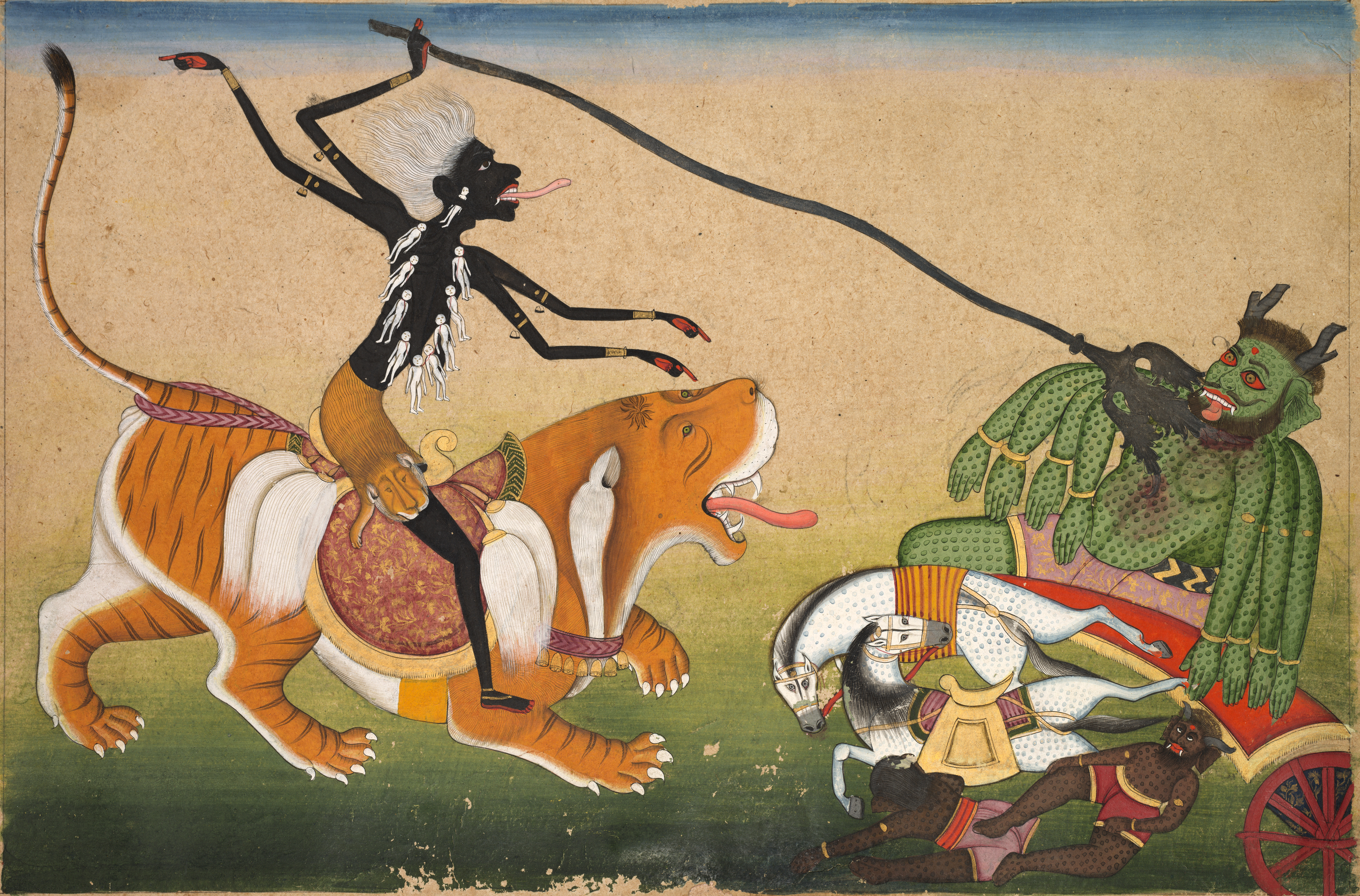
A Pahari depiction of Kali (sometimes described as a form of Parvati) attacking Nisumbha with her trident: Kali Attacking Nisumbha; c. 1740

In the final battle against Shumbha, Devi absorbs Kali and the seven mothers and stands alone for the final battle.

After the battle, the gods praise Devi. The hymn is known as Narayani Stuti which affirms her role as the creator, preserver and destroyer of the universe. Devi, pleased with the devas, grants them a boon that she will always destroy the demons and bring peace to earth. She mentions her future incarnations and their respective acts (Chapter 11). Then Devi mentions the benefits, accrual of peace, bliss of worshipping her and disappears (Chapter 12).

The sage finishes the tale. He tells the king and the merchant to take refuge in Devi to rid themselves of their delusion. Both the king and the merchant undertake penance and Devi grants them her vision. The king asks Devi for his lost kingdom and Devi grants it to him. The merchants asks Devi for wisdom and she grants it to him (Chapter 13).

=== Symbolism of the three episodes ===
Who is this Goddess?

I resemble in form Brahman,
from me emanates the world,
which has the Spirit of Prakriti and Purusha,
I am empty and not empty,
I am delight and non-delight,
I am knowledge and ignorance,
I am Brahman and not Brahman.

— Devi Mahatmya

Devadatta Kali states that the three tales are "allegories of outer and inner experience". Kali states that the evil adversaries of the Goddess symbolize the all-too-human impulses, such as pursuit of power, or possessions, or delusions such as arrogance. The Goddess wages war against this. Like the philosophical and symbolic battlefield of the Bhagavad Gita, the Devi Mahatmya symbolic killing grounds target human frailties, according to Kali, and the Goddess targets the demons of ego and dispels our mistaken idea of who we are.

Thomas Coburn states that most hymns present the Goddess's martial exploits, but these are "surpassed by verses of another genre, viz., the hymns to the Goddess". The hymnic portion of the text balances the verses that present the spiritual liberation power of the Goddess. These hymns describe the nature and character of the Goddess in spiritual terms:

1. Brahma-stuti (part 1 start),
2. Sakradi-stuti (part 2 end),
3. The "Ya Devi" Hymn (part 3 start),
4. Narayani-stuti (part 3 end).

== Angas (appendages) ==
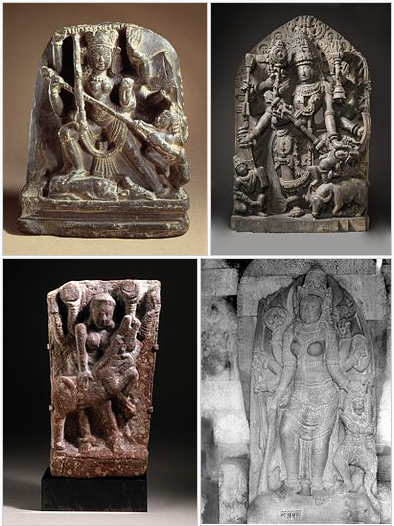
Artwork depicting the "Goddess Durga Slaying the Buffalo demon Mahishasura" scene of Devi Mahatmya, is found all over India, Nepal and southeast Asia. Clockwise from top: 9th-century Kashmir, 13th-century Karnataka, 9th century Prambanan Indonesia, 2nd-century Uttar Pradesh

As an independent text, Devī Māhātmya has acquired a number of "limbs" or "subsidiary texts" or "appendages" (angas) over the years "fore and aft". According to Coburn "artistic evidence suggests that the angas have been associated with the text since the fourteenth century." The angas are chiefly concerned with the ritual use of Devī Māhātmya and based on the assumption that the text will be recited aloud in the presence of images.

=== Preceding subsidiary texts ===
- Durga Saptasloki or Amba Stuti – They are introduced as one-verse query from Shiva who asks about the means of achieving what is desired, and a one verse response from the Goddess who says she will proclaim the relevant discipline (sadhana) by revealing these seven verses.
- Devi Kavacham – The Devi Kavacham consisting of 61 shlokas is in the Markandeya Purana. Its recitation is regarded to protect the reader in all parts of their body, in all places, and in all difficulties.
- Argala Stotram – Markandeya tells his disciples in 27 couplets on the greatness of Devi. She is described in all aspects and names. At the end of each shloka, prayer is offered to Devi for material prosperity, physical fitness, fame and victory.
- Keelakam – Markandeya tells his disciples in 16 shlokas, the ways and means of removing obstacles faced by devotees, while reading the Devi Mahatmya.
- Ratri Suktam (Vedic) – Ratri Suktam (8 shlokas) is from the Rigveda, 10th mandala, 10th anuvaka, 127th sukta, to indicate that Devi was worshipped from time immemorial. Devi is described as the all-pervading Supreme Lord of the Universe appearing in Omkara. Ratri is described as the Goddess who fulfills the prayers of devotees.
- Kunjika Stotram – A hymn combining the Devi Kavacham, Argala Stotram, Keelakam, and the Rahasya Parvam (Murti Rahasyam and Vaikrutika Rahasyam). It is said that Shiva recited this shloka to Parvati at her attainment of brahma jnana. It is featured at the end of the Devi Saptashati.
- Ratri Suktam (Tantrik) – The hymn in the first chapter is the Tantrik Ratri Sukta.

=== Succeeding subsidiary texts ===
- Pradhana Rahasyam – This text describes mula prakrti as the cause of creation.
- Vaikritika Rahasyam – This text describes how the Godhead beyond change subjected itself to change, and how mula prakrti became vikriti.
- Murti Rahasyam – This text mentions the avatars and the murtis of the Goddess.
- Devi Suktam (Rig Vedoktam) – The 8 shlokas composed by Vak, the daughter of Maharshi Ambharin, are from the Rig Veda, 10th Mandala, 10th Anuvaka, 125th Sukta. These shlokas describe the realisation of Vak, who identifies herself as Brahma Shakti, and expresses herself as 11 Rudras, 8 Vasus, 12 Adityas and all the Devas— Indra, Agni and Asvini Kumaras—who are sustained by her and describes her as the source, substratum, and support of the whole world. She is described to be Brahmasvarupini (embodiment of Brahman).
- Devi Suktam (Tantrik) – The hymn in chapter 5 is the Tantrik Devi Suktam.

The number and order of these depend on the sampradaya (tradition).

== Significance ==
The Devi Mahatmya was considered significant among the Puranas by Indologists. This is indicated by the early dates when it was translated into European languages. It was translated into English in 1823, followed by an analysis with excerpts in French in 1824. It was translated into Latin in 1831 and Greek in 1853.

=== Place in the Hindu canon ===
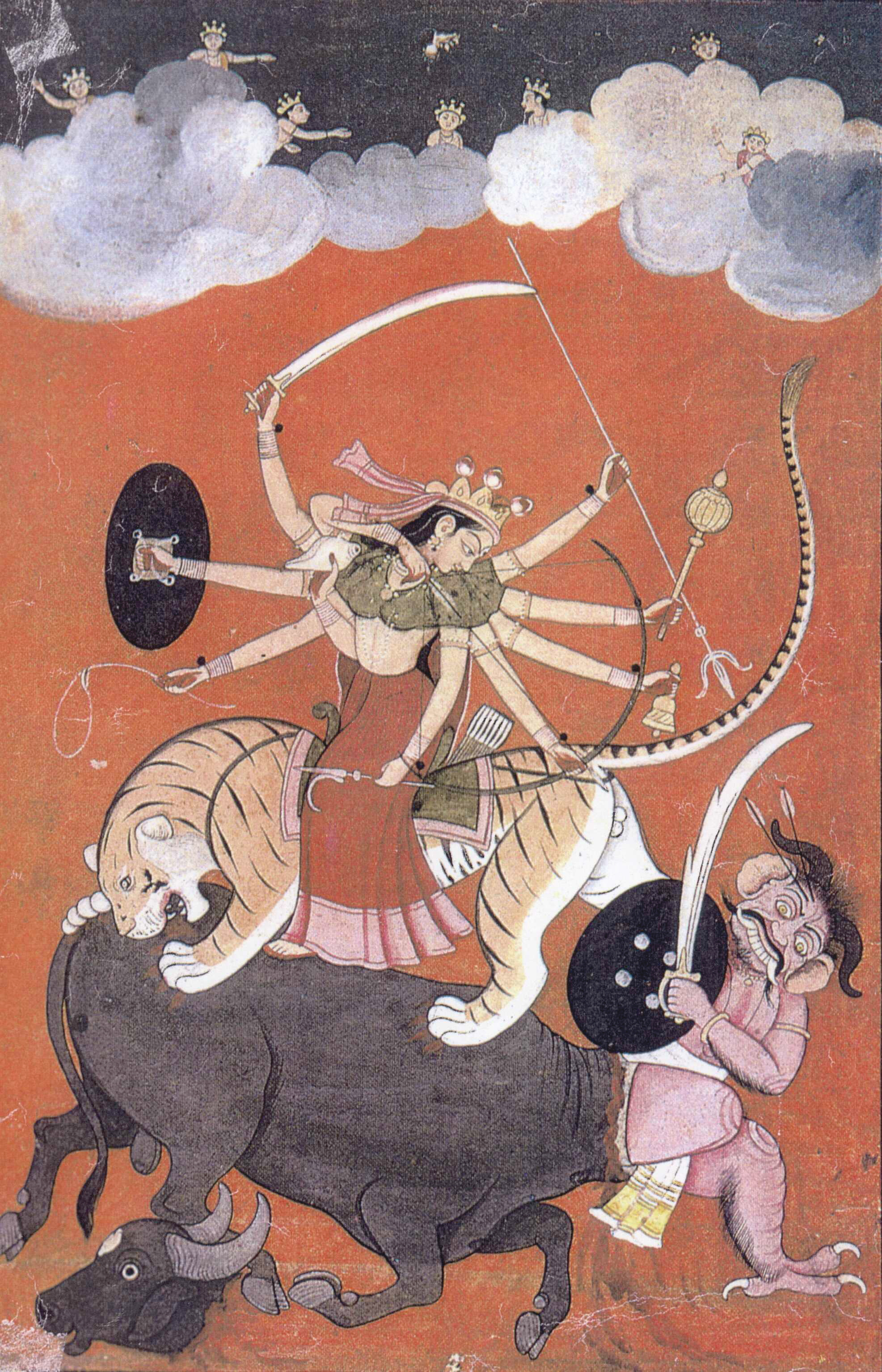
Devi portrayed as Mahishasura Mardini, Slayer of the Buffalo Demon—a central episode of the Devi Mahatmya

Devi Māhātmyam has been called the Testament of Shakta philosophy. It is the base and root of Shakta doctrine. It appears as the centre of the great Shakti tradition of Hinduism.

It is in Devi Mahatmya, states C Mackenzie Brown, that "the various mythic, cultic and theological elements relating to diverse female divinities were brought together in what has been called the 'crystallization of the Goddess tradition."

The unique feature of Devi Māhātmyam is the oral tradition. Though it is part of the devotional tradition, it is in the rites of the Hindus that it plays an important role. The entire text is considered as one single Mantra and a collection of 700 Mantras.

The Devi Māhātmyam is treated in the cultic context as if it were a Vedic hymn or verse with sage (ṛṣi), meter, pradhnadevata, and viniyoga (for japa). It has been approached, by Hindus and Western scholars, as scripture in and by itself, where its significance is intrinsic, not derived from its Puranic context.

According to Damara Tantra "Like Aswamedha in Yagnas, Hari in Devas, Sapthsati is in hymns." "Like the Vedas; Saptasati is eternal" says Bhuvaneshwari Samhita.

There are many commentaries on Devi Māhātmya.

- Sadhan Samar by Brahmarshi Satyadeva
- Guptavati by Bhaskararaya
- Nagesi by Nagoji Bhat
- Santhanavi
- Puspanjali
- Ramashrami
- Dhamsoddharam
- Tattva Prakashika
- Chaturdhari
- Jagachandrachandrika
- Durgapradeepam are some of them.

The significance of Devi Māhātmya has been explained in many Tantric and Puranic texts like Katyayani Tantra, Gataka Tantra, Krodha Tantra, Meru Tantram, Marisa Kalpam, Rudra Yamala, and Chidambara Rahasya.

Devi Mahatmya continues to inspire people. In 2025, US based music composer Raleigh Rajan created a musical form for Ya Devi hymn by incorporating percussion instruments from various Indian states to highlight the presence of Shakta philosophy and Shakti worshipping across the breadth and width of the country.

== In worship ==
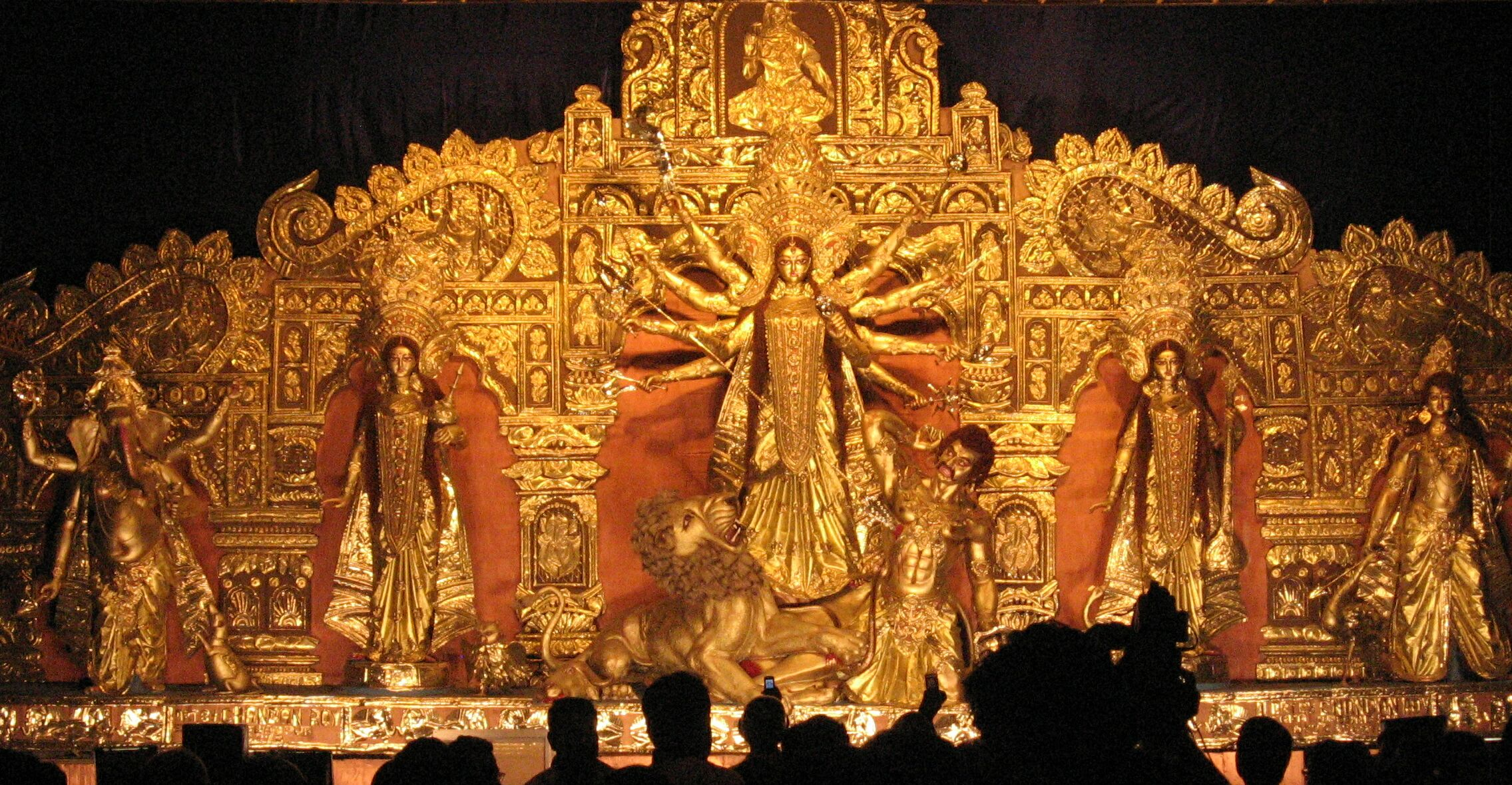
Recitation of Durga Mahatmya on Mahalaya marks the formal beginning of the Durga Puja festival.

The recitation of Devi Mahatmya is done during the Sharad Navaratri (October – November) in India. It is recited during Navaratri celebrations, the Durga Puja festival and in Durga temples of India.

In the theological practices of the goddess tradition of Hinduism, the middle episode is the most important. If a community or individual cannot recite the entire Devi Mahatmyam composition, the middle episode alone is recited at a puja or festival. Further, when the recital begins, the tradition is to complete the reading of the middle episode completely as a partial reading is considered to create a spiritual chidra or "chink in the armor".

== See also ==
- Chandi di Var
- Devi Upanishad
- Devi Bhagavata Purana
- Devi Gita
