= Kamakshi Amman Temple =

Hindu temple in Kanchipuram

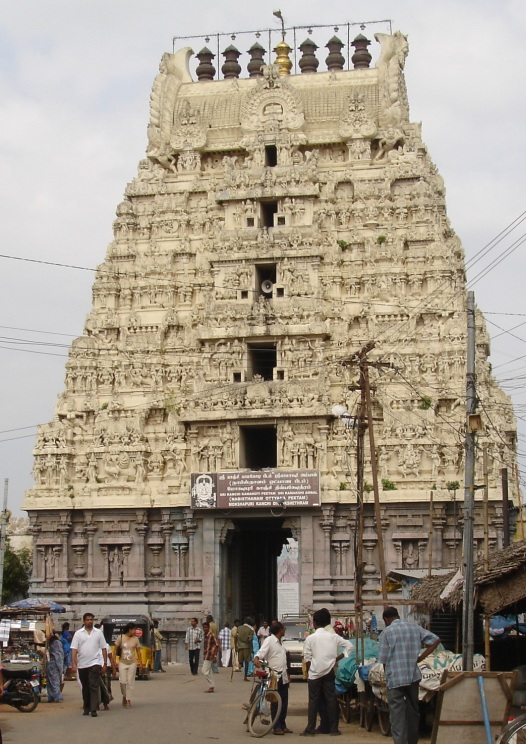
- Main gopuram (entrance tower) to the temple

- Location in Tamil Nadu Kamakshi Amman Temple (Tamil Nadu)

Religion
- Affiliation: Hinduism
- District: Kanchipuram district
- Deity: Kamakshi

Location
- Location: Kanchipuram Town
- State: Tamil Nadu
- Country: India
- Coordinates: 12.840684°N 79.703238°E

Architecture
- Type: Dravidian architecture

The Kamakshi Amman Temple, also known as Kamakoti Nayaki Kovil, is a Hindu temple dedicated to the goddess Kamakshi, a primary aspect of Adi Shakti, the supreme goddess in Shaktism. The temple is located in the historic city of Kanchipuram, near Chennai, India.

It was founded in the 5th-8th century CE by the Pallava kings, whose capital was in Kanchipuram.

Classified as one of the 18 main Shakta Pithas, it is a major centre of Shaktism in Tamil Nadu. The temple also houses a shrine for Vishnu, in his form of Varaha, (Note: templenet.com, Abodes of Vishnu - Tirukkalvanoor) and is one of the Divya Desams, the sacred sites of the Sri Vaishnava tradition.

== History ==
The temple may have been founded by the Pallava kings in the 5th-8th century, whose capital was in Kanchipuram. The temple is glorified by the 6th-9th century Vaishnavite Alvars (Tamil saint poets) in the Naalayira Divya Prabandham (compiled 9th century). It was modified in the fourteenth and seventeenth century. According to Babu, it was built by the Chola's in the 14th century.

Koskoff refers to a legend about the golden statue of Kamakshi. According to this legend, after the fall of the Vijayanagar Empire in 1565 the statue had been carried throughout South India by attendants, seeking a permanent temple. From 1739 to 1781 it was enshrined in the Tiruvarur temple, and in 1783 the Kamakshi Amman temple was built for the idol.

== Architecture ==
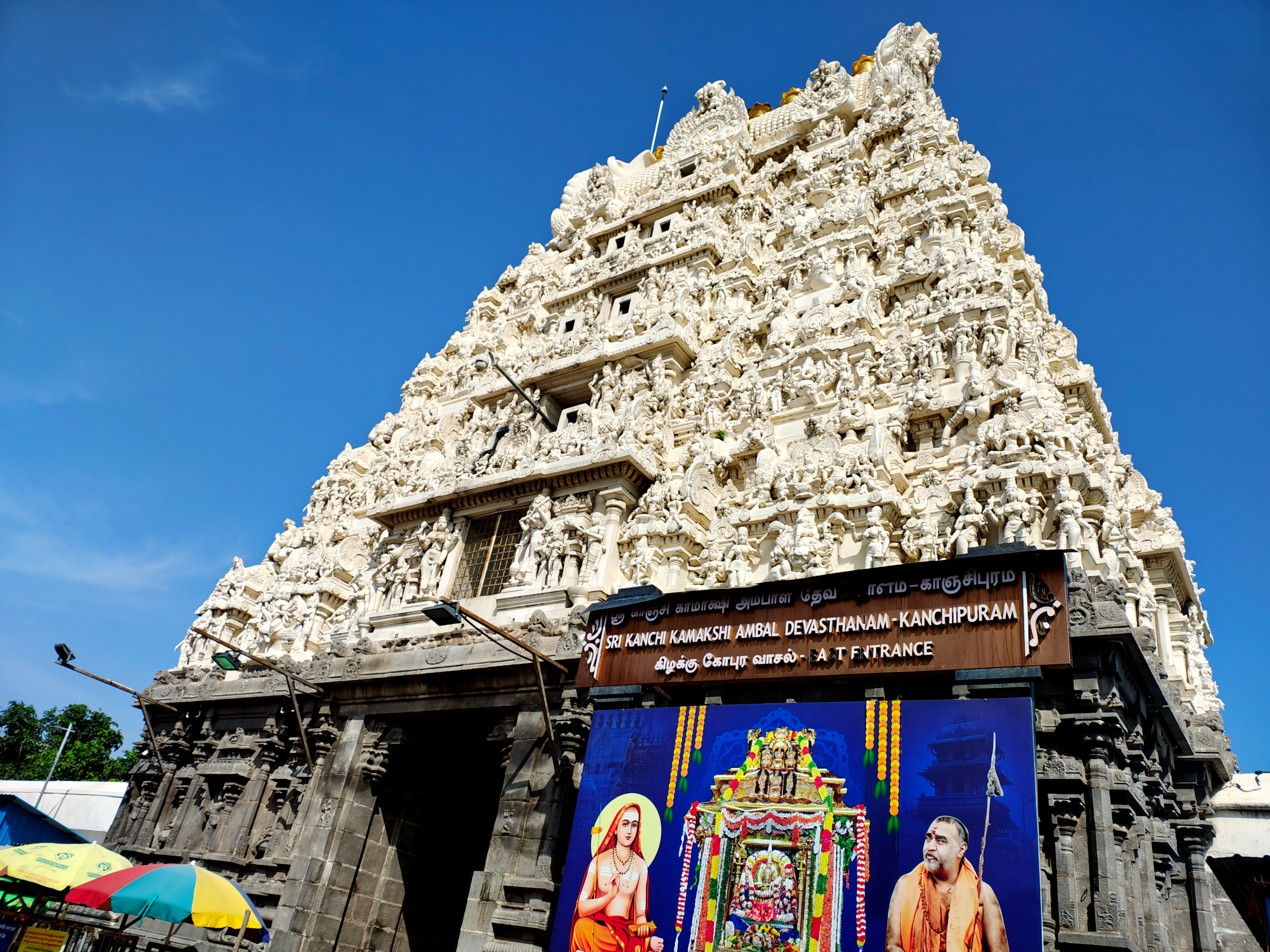
Kamakshi Amman Temple East Gopuram

The temple occupies an area of 5 acres (2.0 ha). The sanctum houses the image of Kamakshi in a seated posture and is flanked by the trinity of Shiva, Vishnu, and Brahma. There are smaller shrines of Bangaru (Golden) Kamakshi, Adi Shankara and Saraswati around the sanctum.

The temple is maintained and administered by Shri Kamkotti Peetam which administered by Shri Jayendra Saraswati Swamigal, one of the Sacred Peetadhipathis of Hinduism

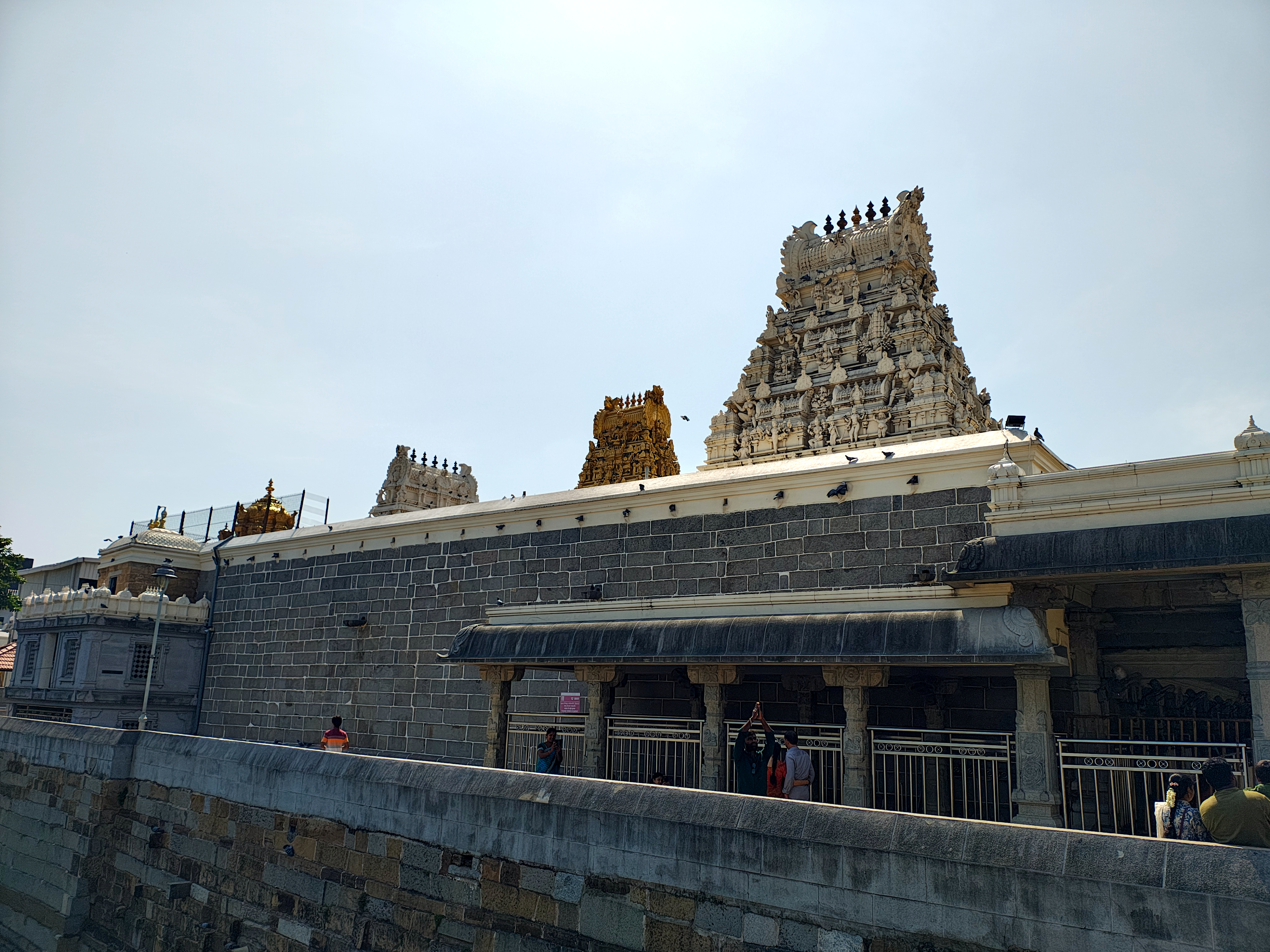
Kamakshi Amman Temple from the Inside

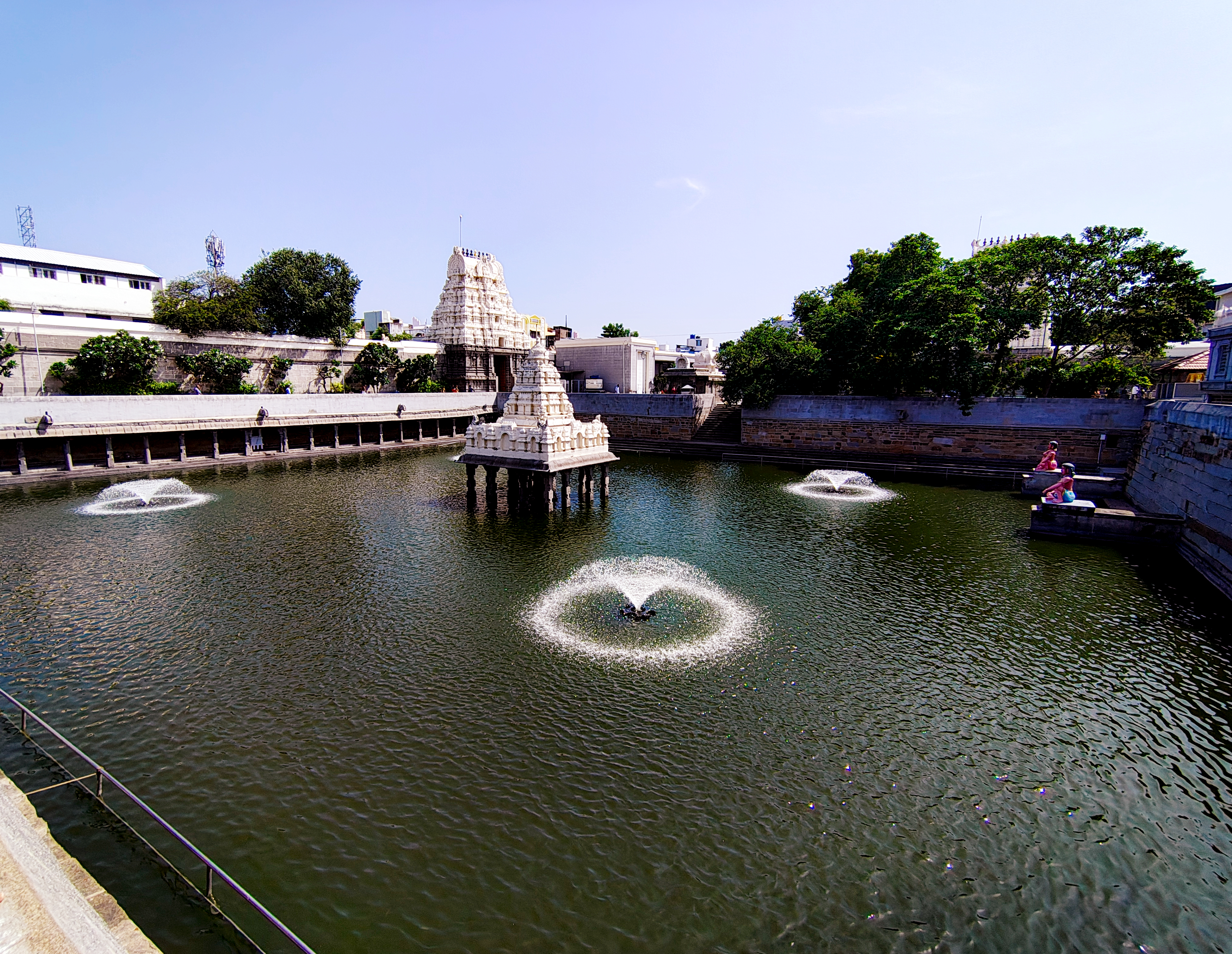
Kamakshi Amman Temple Pond

=== Kamakshi-shrine ===
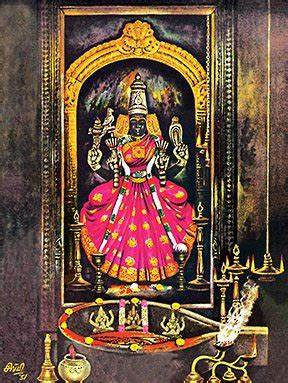
A painting of Goddess Kamakshi in the sanctum

Goddess Kamakshi is worshipped in the shrine in five forms:

1. Sri Kamakshi Para Bhattarika – Kamakshi is the main deity of the temple. The idol is seated in the center of the inner sanctum of the shrine from the Gayatri Mandapa. According to the Kamakshi Rahasya, this hall was built by the celestials with the four walls representing the four Vedas and the twenty-four pillars representing the twenty-four syllables of the Gayatri Mantra. The idol, which forms the inner core of the Gayatri Hall, is enshrined at the center of the hall as Kamakshi. She is seated on a throne made from the five Brahmas and sports in her four hands a noose, goad, a sugarcane bow, and flower arrow. The idol is depicted seated in the Padmasana (Lotus pose) and faces south-east. The idol of Kamakshi has been described as representing her three forms: Sthula (symbolizing Dhyana and Yoga), Sukshma (symbolizing Mantra and Yantra), and Karana or Vasanatmaka. In front of the idol is a Sri Yantra, which according to the temple history was placed there by Adi Shankaracharya.
2. Tapa Kamakshi – This form of Kamakshi can be seen to the right of the main idol and close to the Bila gate. Legend says that Parvati was separated from Shiva, and appeared first as Annapurneshwari in either Varanasi or Horanadu and then following the advice of sage Katyayana, moved to Kanchipuram to worship Shiva as Ekambareswara under the mango tree near the Vegavati river and married him. Goddess Kamakshi is depicted as a yogini in a balancing yoga pose in this idol.
3. Anjana Kamakshi – Also known as Arupa Lakshmi (formless Lakshmi), her shrine is situated to the left of the main idol, facing the north and in front of the Saubhagya Ganapati shrine. According to legend, Lakshmi, due to a curse, is said to have performed penance on her husband Vishnu's insistence to regain her lost beauty in this place and, due to the incident, a Lakshmi shrine was built and offerings of kumkuma are offered to her here before being accepted by the devotees. While she represents Lakshmi in her form as Lakshmi Bija, she represents Kamakshi in the form of Kamakalakshara which is inherent in the Lakshmi shrine.
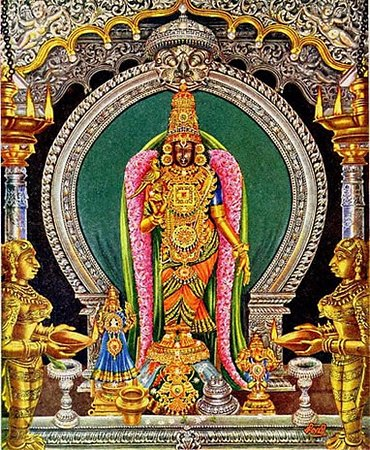
  Bangaru Kamakshi in Thanjavur
4. Swarna Kamakshi – The shrine of this deity, also known as Bangaru Kamakshi in Telugu, is situated in the second enclosure. It is said that this form was created by Kamakshi herself, from her third eye to serve as the consort of Shiva as Ekambareswara. After marrying Shiva, she was known as Goddess Elavarkuzhali. The original idol that appeared is seen today in Thanjavur. The golden idol was taken to Thanjavur by a man named Kamakshi Dasar, in the wake of Muslim invasions. The current idol is made of panchaloha, an alloy of 5 metals.
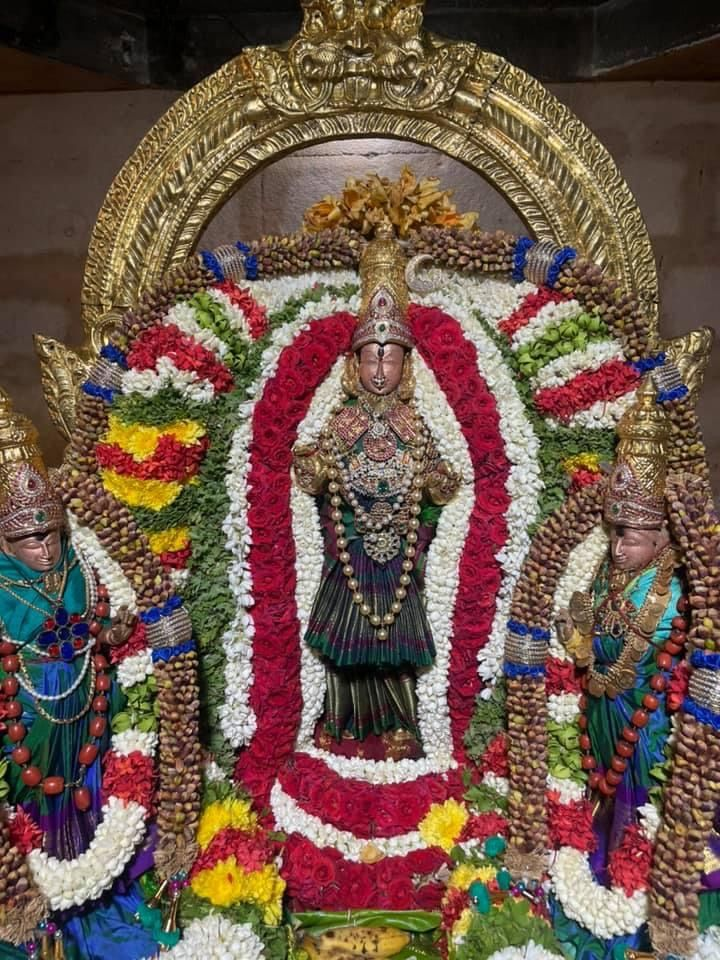
  Utsava Kamakshi
5. Utsava Kamakshi – The shrine of Utsava Kamakshi, the idol which is brought out during processions, is located in the second enclosure. The idol is accompanied on either side by idols of Saraswati and Lakshmi. While the gods and goddesses are generally accompanied by their consorts in most cases, on account of Kamakshi being powerful than Shiva, there is no shrine for Shiva here. Tripura Sundari, who appeared from the fire for the destruction of Bhandasura, was presented to the world by Brahma with the name Kamakshi. Thus, Kamakshi is the special epithet of the goddess. As she brings joy to the mind of Shiva alias Kameshwara, she is referred to as Kameshwari.

=== Durvasa ===
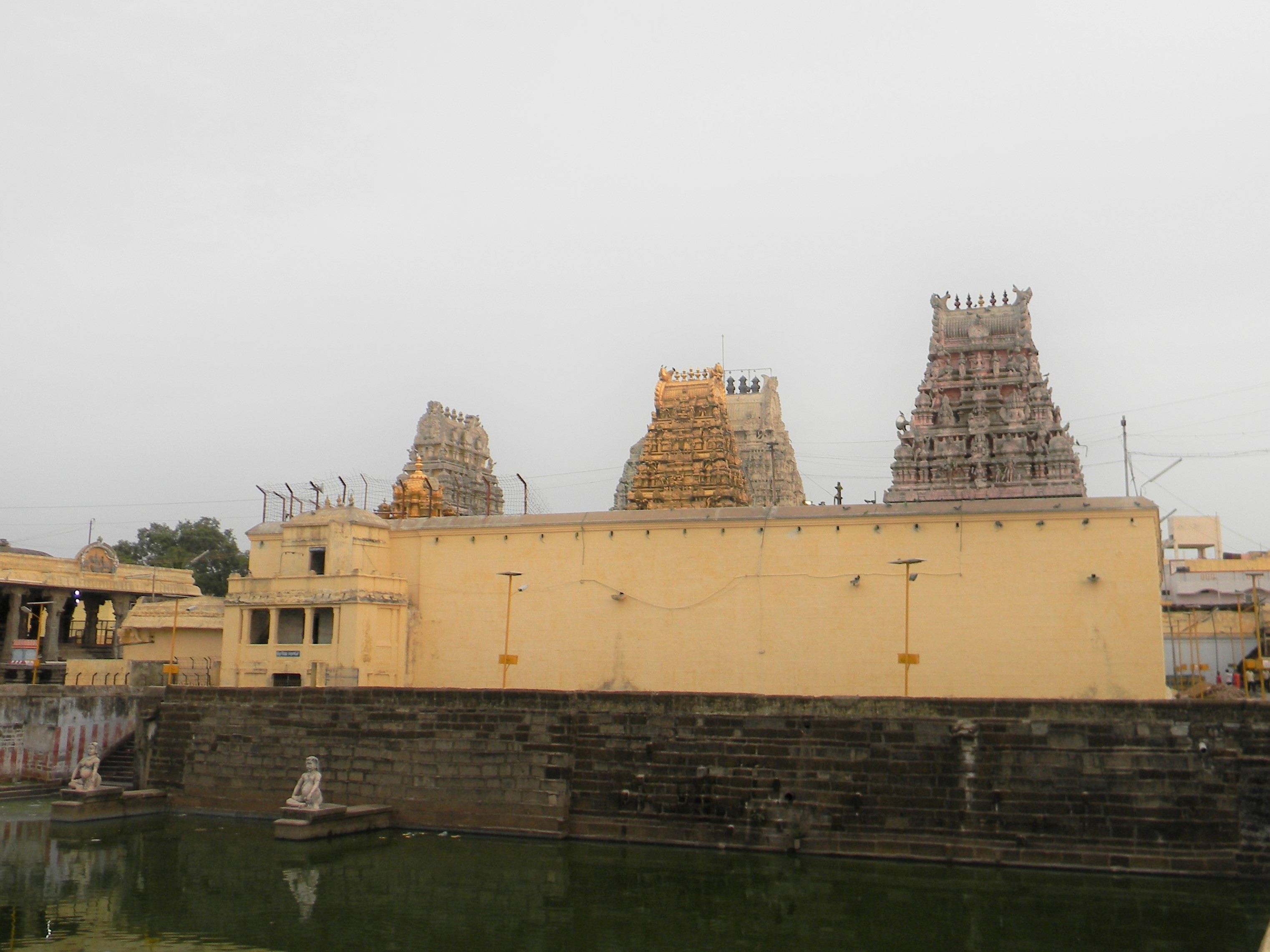
Kamakshi Amman Temple with the golden overlay over its sanctum.

In front of the main shrine, is the shrine of Durvasa, considered to be an avatar of Shiva. There are thirty-two chief assistants of the goddess eg. Surya, Chandra, Kubera, etc. Among these, Kamadeva, Lopamudra and Durvasa are the chief assistants.

Durvasa represents the sattva power of the goddess, used to protect and correct her devotees, and thus her limitless power and grace. It is Durvasa who is believed to have established the shrine by consecrating a Sri Yantra in front of the idol. He composed the Lalita Stavaratna, also called the Arya Dwishati, describing Manidvipa, the abode of Kamakshi. He also composed the Tripura Mahimna Stotra, a complete shastra in itself, and also the Para Shambho Mahima Stotra. Due to a curse by Saraswati, he was born as a deaf and mute man and was graced by Kamakshi with Anugraha Diksha, relieving a part of his curse.

=== Tirukkalvanur Divya Desam (Vishnu) ===
The temple also houses a shrine for Vishnu in the form of Varaha Perumal. The Tirukkalvanur Divya Desam is one of the 108 Divya Desams (Vishnu and Lakshmi temples that are mentioned in the works of the Alvars). The original temple was a little further from the Kamakshi temple; due to the ruined state of the old shrine, the deity is now placed inside the Kamakshi temple, in the belief that Vishnu is the brother of Kamakshi.

A shrine dedicated to Hayagriva, an avatar of Vishnu and the sage Agastya can be seen in the third enclosure of the temple, at the location where Agastya learned the Lalita Sahasranamam from Hayagriva.

== Legend ==
=== Shakta Pithas ===
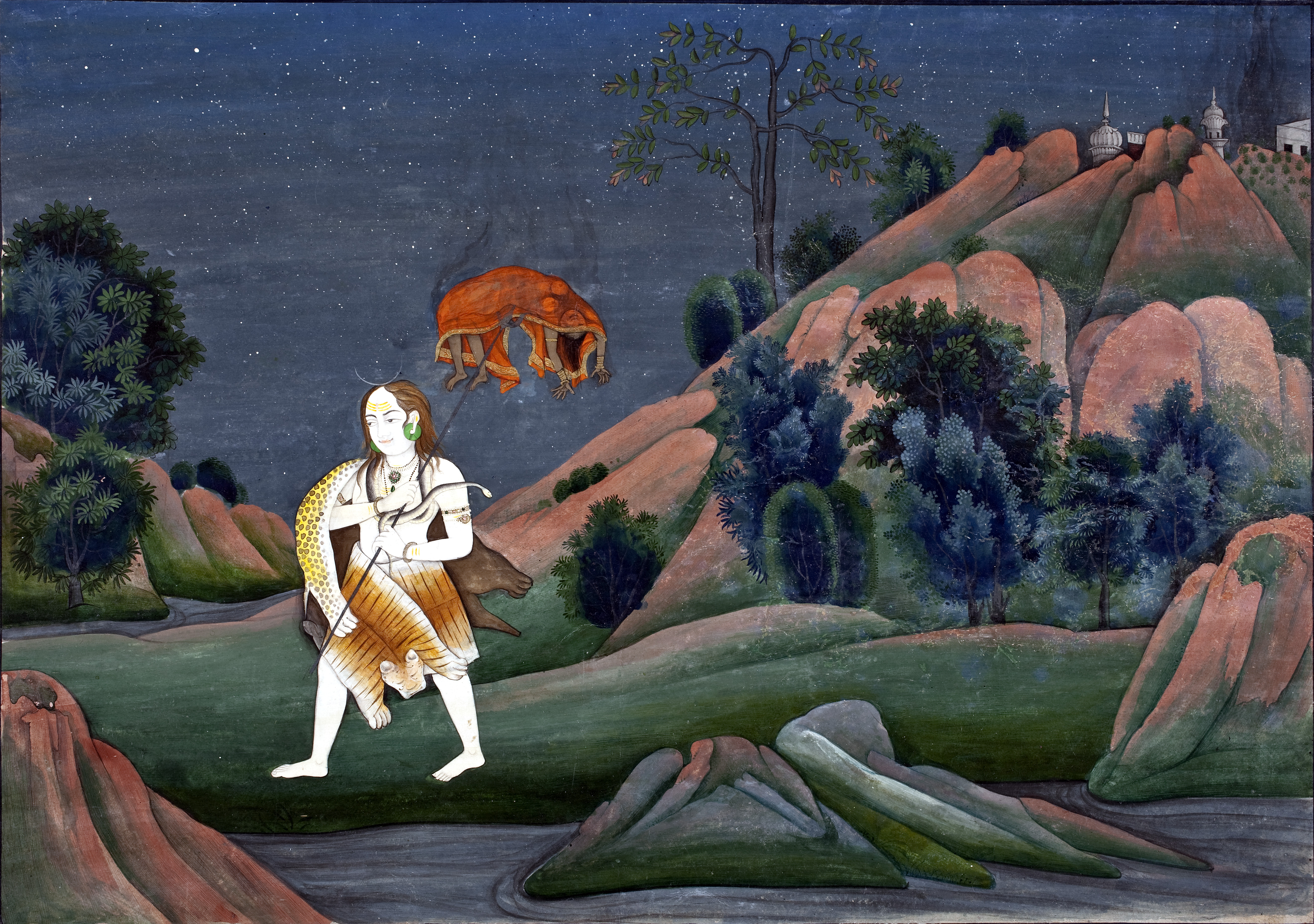
Shiva carrying the burnt corpse of Sati.

The ancient story of Daksha yajna and Sati's self-immolation is the main theme in the origin of Shakta pithas. Shakta pithas are the divine temples of Adi Parashakti. The cause of the presence of the goddess is due to the falling of body parts of the corpse of Sati, Shiva's first wife. The navel part of Sati's body is believed to have fallen here in Kanchipuram, giving the name Nabhi Peetham or Odhyana Peetham. There are 51 Shakta pithas linked to the 51 alphabets in Sanskrit, out of which 18 are the most visited.

=== Tripura Sundari ===
According to legend, Tripura Sundari settled here after killing a demon. Tantric texts such as Tripura Rahasya, Bahvrucha Upanishad, as well as Puranas such Brahmanda Purana and Markandeya Purana discuss how Tripura Sundari resides in Kanchipuram.

=== Bhandasura ===
According to Puranas, the Devatas were tormented by the demon Bhandasura, and performed penance to appease the Goddess Adi Parashakti in the form of parrots, perching on champaka trees at the temple, since parrots always perch on the right hand of the Goddesses Meenakshi and Kamakshi. Pleased with their penance, the Goddess is said to have appeared through the Bila gate and killed Bhandasura. The Bila gate leading to the Bilakasha tree can be seen today in front of the Tapa Kamakshi shrine inside the sanctum.

=== Lord Shiva ===
It is said that Lord Shiva, the inseparable husband of Shakti worshipped the Goddess in the four yugas assuming the forms of the sages Krodha Bhattaraka in the Satya Yuga, Parashurama in the Treta Yuga, Dhaumya in the Dwapara Yuga, and the revered Adi Shankara in the Kali Yuga.

It is also said that Lord Shiva assumed the form of Durvasa Muni on Divine Mother Kamakshi's emergence from the tree and first worshipped her by chanting the Sri Vidya Tantra and consecrating a huge structure of the Sri Yantra in a yoni shaped trough, in-front of the Kamakshi idol. Durvasa Muni is thus the traditional teacher of Sri Vidya and foremost Gurus of the Sri Vidhya Parampara.

=== Adi Shankaracharya ===
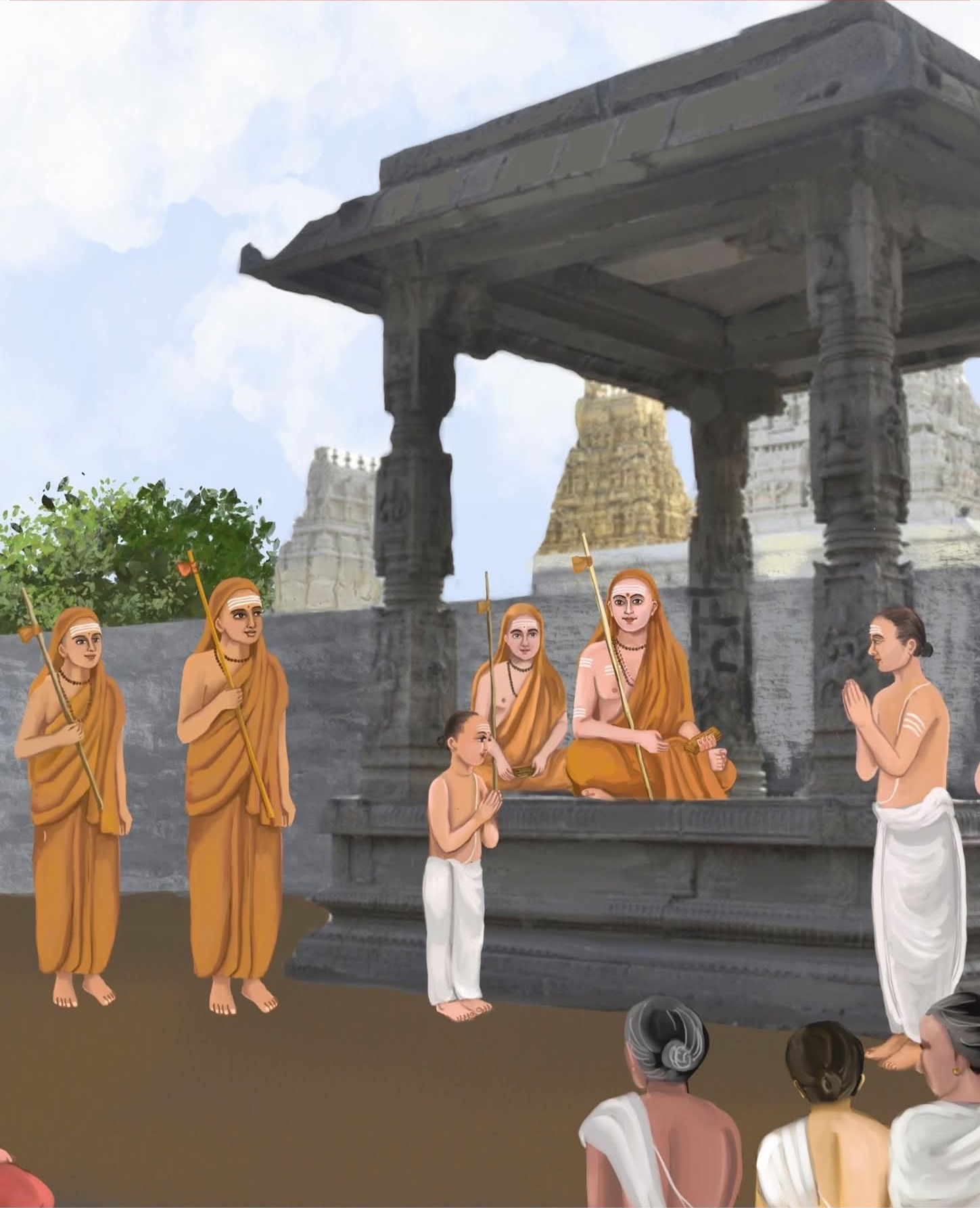
Jagadguru Adi Shankaracharya

Adi Shankara is credited for consecrating the current Sri Chakra Yantram in front of Kamakshi Ambal. The Divine Beings (Vashinyadi Vagdevadas) who composed the Lalita Sahasranama can be seen around the Sri Chakra Yantra in the same positions as depicted in Manidvipa, which is the abode of Divine Mother Kamakshi.

== Temple rituals and festivals ==
Four worship services are offered each day. Every day the temple rituals start with the Gau Pooja and Gaja Pooja. There is a separate shed with elephants, which performs pooja to the deity by trumpeting every day early morning at 5 AM.

The annual festival falls in Spring, in the Tamil month of Masi, which runs from mid-February to mid-March. During this Mahotsavam, the most important day to be celebrated is Maasi Pooram, which is the Avirbhava dhina of Lalitha Maha Tripura Sundari in Kanchi. Other than that, the chariot festival (Ther) and float festival, (Theppam) are held. Other festivals include Navaratri, Aadi and Aippasi Pooram, Sankara Jayanthi and Vasanta Utsavam in the Tamil month of Vaikasi. All Fridays are considered sacred, though the Fridays in the Tamil months of Adi (mid-July to mid-August) and Thai (mid-January to mid-February) are celebrated.

== Kanchi Kamakoti Peetham ==
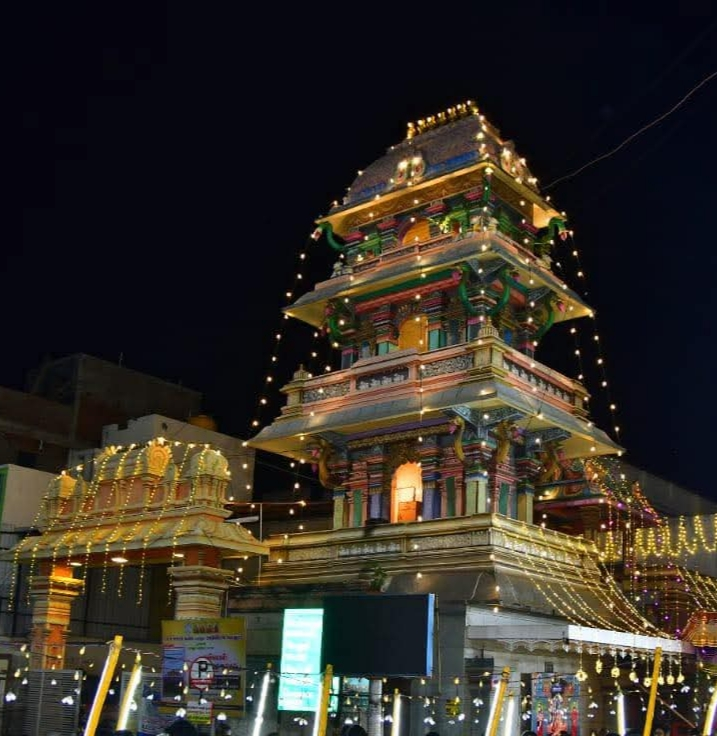

The temple is also the center for the Kanchi Kamakoti Peetham . The Kanchi Kamakoti Peetham is deeply connected to the Sri Kamakshi Temple in Kanchipuram. The Jagadguru Shankaracharya Swamigal of the Peetham serves as the hereditary trustee of the Kamakshi Ambal Devasthanam, ensuring the temple's rituals and festivals are conducted according to ancient traditions and the instructions of the Shankaracharya. The temple's deity, Kamakshi, is revered as a major center of Shaktism, and the Peetham plays a significant role in its upkeep and management.

== Sources ==
Printed sources

- Babu, Ganesh (2020). Tourism Guide. Tamilnadu and Pondicherry. Archers & Elevators Publishing House.
- Koskoff, Ellen, ed. (2008). "Syama Sastri". The Concise Garland Encyclopedia of World Music. Volume 2. The Middle East, South Asia, East Asia, Southeast Asia. Routledge.
- NN (2011). Rough Guide to India. Rough Guides UK.
- Pokhriyal, Ramesh (2023). Famous Temples in Tamil Nadu. Diamond Pocket Books.

Web-sources
