= Parashurama Kalpasutra =

Hindu text on Shri Vidya system of worship

The Parashurama Kalpasutra (Sanskrit: परशुरामकल्पसूत्रम्, romanized: Paraśurāmakalpasūtram) is a Shakta Agama, a Hindu text on Shri Vidya practices ascribed to the Kaula tradition. The authorship of the text is traditionally attributed to Parashurama, the sixth avatar of Vishnu and a disciple of Dattatreya. It is a sacred text for the Shri Vidya worshippers of the goddess Lalita, considered to be a manifestation of the supreme goddess Adi Parashakti. The text is also used in the worship of Ganesha, Bala Tripurasundari, Matangi, and Varahi.

== Key concepts ==
In the text, Parashurama emphasises the importance of urdhvamnaya (the tradition of the above), detailing the correct performance of esoteric rituals such as japa, puja, mudras, and pranayama. It also elaborates on Tantric worship through symbols and mantras believed to awaken the inner senses and the kundalini.

== Structure ==
The text originates from the Dattatreya Samhita, a text originally comprising ten thousand suktas . According to tradition, Parashurama condensed the Samhita into six thousand suktas across fifty parts at the instruction of Dattatreya. The surviving text consists of 84 sutras organised into ten sections, compiled by Parashurama's disciple, Sumedha.

The text consists of:

1. Dīkṣā Vidhi
2. Gaṇanāyaka Paddhati
3. Śrīkramam
4. Lalitā Kramam
5. Navāvaraṇa Pūjā
6. Śyāmā Kramam
7. Vārāhī Kramam
8. Parā Kramam
9. Homa Vidhāna
10. Sarva Sādhāraṇa Kramam

== Sources ==
Key concepts and practices as described in Parashurama Kalpasutra are also written in the Nityotsava Nibandaha, a book compiled by Umānandanātha, a disciple of the Śrī Vidyā exponent Bhāskararāya (Bhāsurānandanātha).

== See also ==
- Devi Mahatmya
- Shri Vidya
