= Sri Kanchi Kamakshi =

1978 Indian Tamil religious film

- Theatrical release poster
- Directed by: K. S. Gopalakrishnan
- Starring: Major Sundarrajan; Gemini Ganesan; R. Muthuraman; Thengai Srinivasan; S. A. Ashokan; Sujatha; Srikanth; P. R. Varalakshmi; Rajasulochana; Srividya; Vanisri; Prameela; Y. Vijaya
- Music by: K. S. Raghunathan
- Release date: 30 October 1978
- Running time: 157 minutes
- Country: India
- Language: Tamil

Sri Kanchi Kamakshi is a 1978 Indian Tamil-language devotional film on the goddess Kamakshi. The film, directed by K. S. Gopalakrishnan, is told in a narrative style by the characters played by Major Sundarrajan. Lead roles in the film are played by S. A. Ashokan, Gemini Ganesan, R. Muthuraman, P. R. Varalakshmi, Rajasulochana, Thengai Srinivasan, Kanthimathi, Srividya, Sujatha, Vanisri and K. R. Vijaya. The film was released on 30 October 1978.

== Plot ==
Kuzhanthaiyananda "Meenakshimainthan" is a wanderer, considered the son of the Goddess Kamakshi, is blessed with enormous powers, and with the sole duty of spreading the gospel about the Goddess. At the Kanchipuram Kamakshi Amman temple, he hands over a special Maragatha flower to a woman to cure her husband's leprosy. The woman reveals that a fortune-teller, whom she believes to be the Goddess herself, had foretold her husband's cure. Overwhelmed by devotion, Meenakshimainthan faints upon learning that the Goddess had taken human form to help her devotees.

A villager shares the story of Meenakshimainthan's birth. Meenakshimainthan's parents, who were childless, visited the Kanchipuram Kamakshi Amman temple and stayed overnight. Goddess Kamakshi appeared in his mother Sundari's dream, suggesting they worship Goddess Meenakshi in Madurai. The parents decided to offer their child to the temple if born under Goddess Meenakshi's blessings. Sundari gave birth to twin boys, and one of them, Meenakshimainthan was drawn to the Meenakshi deity. The temple management refused to let Meenakshimainthan stay, but the parents insisted. When the priests tried to abandon the baby, they locked the baby inside the garbhagriha, where Goddess Meenakshi had taken human form and fed him, under the protection of Goddess Kali. The next day, Meenakshimainthan's parents are elated to find a message on the floor, "This is my baby," written by the Goddess herself. Meenakshimainthan grows up in the temple, but a new Dharma Kartha wants him removed. However, the priests refused, and the toddler Meenakshimainthan recites the letters in song form, showcasing his linguistic prowess and proving his divine blessings, which shocked the Dharma Kartha.

As Meenakshimainthan wakes up from his dizziness, he begins to narrate the powers of Goddess Kamakshi. His first story revolves around Bhandasura, an asura who received a boon from Brahma that he could only be killed by a 5-year-old girl child not born to humans. Emboldened by his perceived immortality, Bhandasura terrorized the three worlds, prompting Brahma and other deities to seek Shiva's help. Shiva transformed the deities into parrots and instructed them to pray to Adiparashakti in Kanchipuram. The Trimurti also gathered there to pray. Their devotion led to the formation of a powerful ball of fire, which transformed into a 5-year-old girl. Bhandasura, enraged that this child would be his downfall, ordered the killing of all 5-year-old girls. However, Goddess Adiparashakti, now in the form of a 5-year-old girl, saved the other girls and killed Bhandasura. After the battle, Goddess Adiparashakti ordered Lord Shiva to build a temple in her honor at that place, Kanchipuram, where she would be known as Kamakshi.

Meenakshimainthan shares the next story of Goddess Bangaru Kamakshi, who resides in Thiruvarur. Muthu, a devoted but ignorant follower of Kamakshi, feeds numerous virgin girls as a service to the goddess. Soon, the British government attempts to demolish Muthu's mandapam, where the idol is kept. Muthu resists, and the British magistrate James's mother intervenes, citing the law that the British must not interfere with religious practices in colonial India. Meanwhile, Marthandam, the temple's Dharmakartha, exploits Muthu's illiteracy and cheats him out of his wealth, using forged documents to accuse Muthu of debt. Marthandam's wife, who had previously advised him to mend his ways, becomes mentally unstable due to his continued corruption. In court, Marthandam accuses Muthu of immorality and falsely claims that Muthu had borrowed money without his wife Shenbagam's knowledge. However, the Goddess, disguised as James's mother, influences the judgment in Muthu's favor, ensuring his release. James realizes the Goddess's intervention and cancels the plan to demolish Muthu's mandapam. He orders Marthandam's arrest, but before he can escape with the looted wealth, his mentally unstable wife confronts him. Meenakshimainthan appears, cures Marthandam's wife's illness, and makes Marthandam confess his thefts. Meenakshimainthan informs Muthu that the Goddess will indeed visit his feast, and advises Muthu to gift each girl a parting gift with a headcount of 100 to confirm her visit. Despite James counting and sending in 100 virgin girls to the feast, they find that 101 gifts have been given, confirming that the Goddess had partaken in the offerings. Also, James notices that the parting gift cloth given to one of the virgin girls is now draped on the deity's idol, providing irrefutable proof of Goddess Kamakshi's visit to Muthu's feast.

Meenakshimainthan shares the story of Adi Shankara, a renowned Vedic scholar. Adi Shankara traveled from the Himalayas to Kanchipuram to seek the blessings of the Goddess. However, upon arrival, he found the goddess in a ferocious form, unlike her usual calm nature. The town was suffering from famine and drought. Adi Shankara learned that the goddess's wrath was due to the residents' practice of animal sacrifices, introduced by a Kabaligan priest, which she abhorred. Despite Adi Shankara's counsel to reform, Kabaligan refused. Adi Shankara took on the challenge to calm the Goddess and bring rain to the parched land. Through his prayers, Adi Shankara successfully appeased the Goddess, and rain poured down on the town. Pleased with Adi Shankara's devotion, the Goddess blessed him to establish mathas worldwide to spread her teachings and promote spiritual growth.

Meenakshimainthan shares the story of Margatham, an adopted granddaughter of Subbaiya Pillai, the treasurer at the Kanchipuram temple. Margatham considers the Goddess as her mother, unaware of her adoption. When Thandavaraya Pillai, their house owner, asks Subbaiya Pillai to steal a pearl necklace from the temple, Subbaiya Pillai refuses and decides to purify himself at Kasi. Before leaving, he entrusts Margatham to his neighbor's care. However, the neighbor exploits Margatham's divine blessings to earn money, forcing her to lie to people. Despite Margatham's reluctance, the neighbor's wife tortures her into compliance, threatening to harm Subbaiya Pillai if she doesn't obey. Desperate, Margatham runs to the temple, contemplating self-harm. Goddess Kamakshi and Arupa Lakshmi intervene, taking human form as Margatham's mother and blessing her with the power to speak the truth, which will come to pass. As a result, the neighbor and his wife face consequences for their actions. When Subbaiya Pillai returns from Kasi, he realizes that the Goddess had appeared in human form to save his granddaughter.

Margatham's powers soon gain recognition, and the Pallava king seeks her guidance for an upcoming war with the Chalukyas, fueled by the Kabaligan clan chief's dark magic and animal sacrifices. She advises the Prince to gather intelligence by visiting the Chalukya kingdom. Before the war, the Kabaligan chief demanded a sacrifice of a virgin prince to appease the Gods. The Pallava prince is captured for the sacrifice, but the Chalukya princess, who has fallen in love with him, saves him by claiming they had consummated their love earlier, rendering the sacrifice invalid. The Kabaligan chief suggests marrying the princess to the Pallava prince, using the opportunity to loot the Pallava kingdom. After the marriage, the precious emerald lingam goes missing, and Maragatham helps find it, revealing that the Kabaligan chief is the thief. The chief challenges the Pallava prince to a duel, invoking Goddess Kali's powers. Despite the magical advantage, the Pallava prince, empowered by Goddess Kamakshi's blessings, overpowers and kills the Kabaligan soldier. However, Goddess Kali attempts to kill Maragatham by transforming into a cobra, but Maragatham creates bushes of Andrographis paniculata to use its snake-repellent properties to protect herself.

Ultimately, Goddess Kali realizes Maragatham's divine connection and turns against the Kabaligan chief, killing him as fate demands. The film concludes with everyone gathered around Maragatham, now revealed as the human form of Goddess Kamakshi.

== Cast ==
- Gemini Ganesan as Meenakshimainthan's father
- Sujatha as Sundari, Meenakshimainthan's mother
- Sripriya as Meenakshi
- R. Muthuraman as Adi Shankara
- Jayachandran as a leprosy patient
- Prameela as the leprosy patient's wife
- Srikanth as a Pallava Prince
- Y. Vijaya as a Chalukya Princess
- Thengai Srinivasan as Muthu, an ardent devotee
- P. R. Varalakshmi as Shenbagam, Muthu's wife
- M. R. R. Vasu as Marthandam, the temple Dharmakartha
- Srividya as Dharmakartha's wife
- Ishari Velan as James, a British Magistrate
- Rajasulochana as James's mother
- A. V. M. Rajan as Shiva
- Major Sundarrajan as Kuzhanthaiyananda "Meenakshimainthan"
- S. A. Ashokan as Kabaligan Chief
- V. S. Raghavan as Subbaiya Pillai
- Senthamarai as Kabaligan priest
- Veeraraghavan as a priest in Kanchipuram Kamakshi Amman temple
- K. Kannan as Bhandasura
- V. Gopalakrishnan as a priest in Madurai Meenakshi Amman temple
- A. Karunanidhi as a fake preacher
- S. Rama Rao as a priest in Madurai Meenakshi Amman temple
- C. S. Pandiyan as Subbaiya Pillai's neighbour
- R. M. Sethupathi as Subbaiya Pillai's houseowner
- Usilai Mani as a Chalukya King
- J. Lalitha as Maragadham's mother/ Arupa Lakshmi
- Gandhimathi as Subbaiya Pillai's neighbour
- Tambaram Lalitha as Kali
- Vadivukkarasi
- Typist Gopu as Sambasivam, a rich devotee

== Soundtrack ==
The music was composed by K. S. Raghunathan.

Song	Singers	Lyrics	Length
"Vedhatthin Ucchi.... Unnai Kaana Vendum"	T. M. Soundararajan	A. Maruthakasi	04:33
"Om Sakthi Om"	Seerkazhi Govindarajan, S. C. Krishnan & T. L. Maharajan	A. Maruthakasi	04:19
"Manmathan Kai Karumbin"	Seerkazhi Govindarajan		04:24
"Ana Kana Ngana"	Vani Jairam		02:06

== Critical reception ==
P. S. M. of Kalki praised the acting of cast, Gopalakrishnan's direction and concluded this film will attract women folk. Ananda Vikatan noted thought-provoking lyrics, cool colour photography, a star cluster mixed with fruit and freshness calling it a delicious treat. Naagai Dharuman of Anna praised the acting of the cast, Nagaich's trick photography, Raghunathan's music, Dutt's cinematography and Gopalakrishnan's direction.
