= Srishti =

Srishti may refer to:

- Srishti, a given name
  - Srishti Jain (b. 1996), Indian television actress
  - Srishti Kaur, Indian model and entrepreneur
  - Srishti Rana (b. 1993), Indian model and beauty pageant titleholder
- Srishti (film), 1976 Malayalam film

== See also ==
- Srishti Manipal Institute of Art, Design and Technology, Bangalore
- Srishti Madurai, a volunteer organization
- Shrishti, group of schools Tamil Nadu, India
- Sristi (given name)
