= Bala Tripurasundari =

Hindu goddess

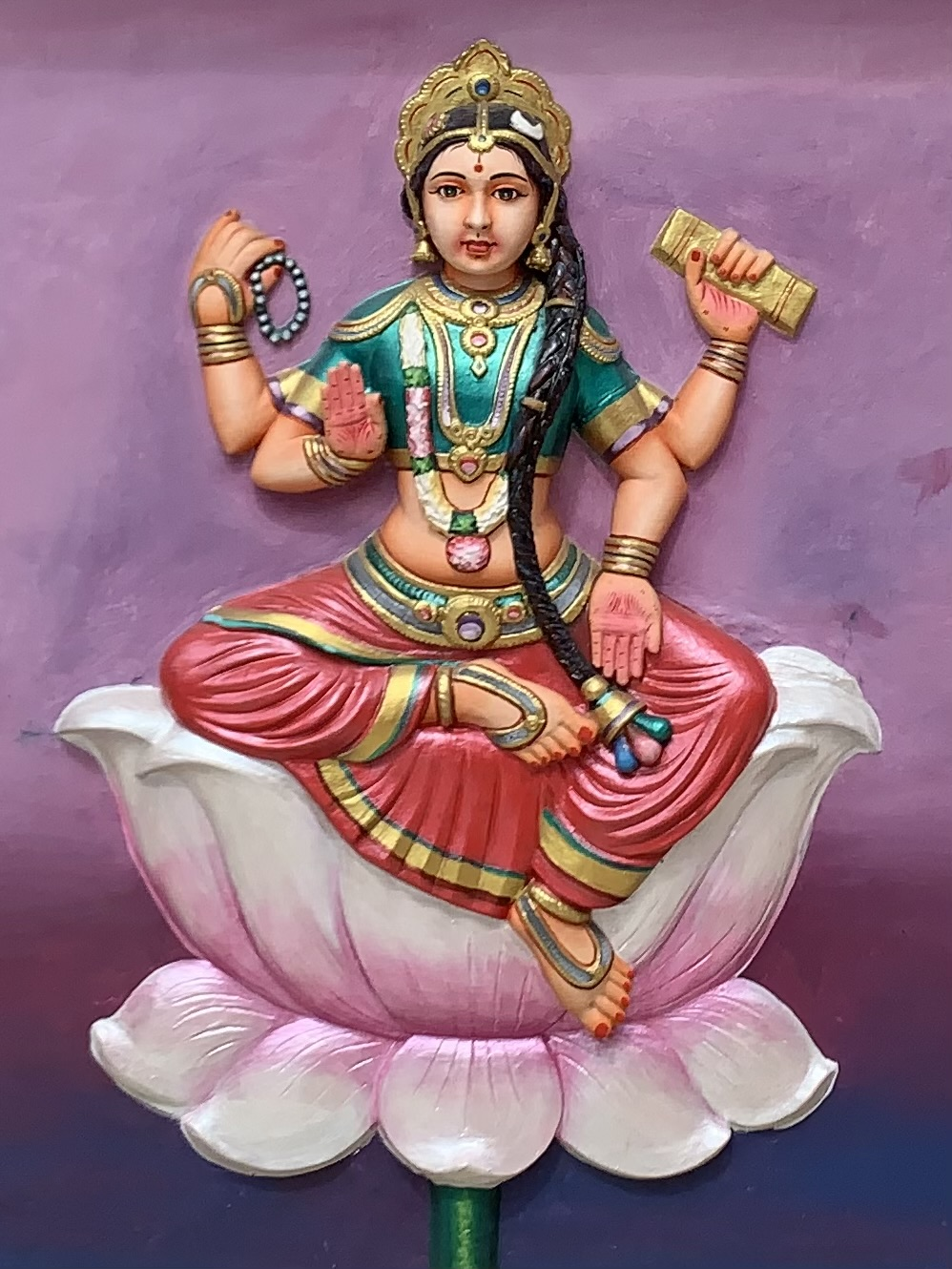
A depiction of Bala Tripura Sundari at a kovil in Johor Bahru, Malaysia

Bala Tripurasundari (Sanskrit: बालत्रिपुरसुन्दरी, romanized: Bālatripurasundarī), also known as Balambika, is variously described as the younger aspect and daughter of the Hindu goddess Tripura Sundari. She is a tutelary goddess of the Tantric Shri Vidya tradition.

== Literature ==
In the Brahmanda Purana, Bala Tripurasundari is mentioned in chapter 26 of the Lalita Mahatmya, where she seeks to battle against the forces of the asura Bhandasura. Bearing the appearance of a nine year old, but possessing great prowess, she sought her mother's permission to slay the sons of the asura. The goddess Tripura Sundari demurred, raising objections of her daughter's young age, her love for her, as well as pointing out there were a number of Matrikas ready to join the fray. When her daughter insisted, the goddess gave in, offering her her very own armour and a number of weapons. She slew the thirty sons of Bhandasura in battle.

== See also ==
- Balambika
- Ashokasundari
- Kumari
- Parvati
- Tripura Sundari
- Sri Chakra
