= Sree Panayannurkavu Devi Temple =

Temple on Pamba River, Kerala, India

Panayyanuurkavu is a temple located on the banks of Pamba River. It is one of the major Tripurasundari temples in Kerala. This temple practiced the traditional Ruruchith way of poojas. This area of Alleppey in Kerala is called Kuttandu ("Chutta nadu"). A forest fire once burnt down the temple. Later Parasurama renovated it and Vasishta gave new Chaithanya (rationality) to the deity with Moola mantras. Parashurama brought Brahmins from Bhadrachalam of Andhra to perform Veda and Mantric poojas of the Thripurasundari and gave secret Moola mantras to them. The same traditional mantras and poojas are still performed.
