= Kurukullā =

Female deity in Tibetan Buddhism

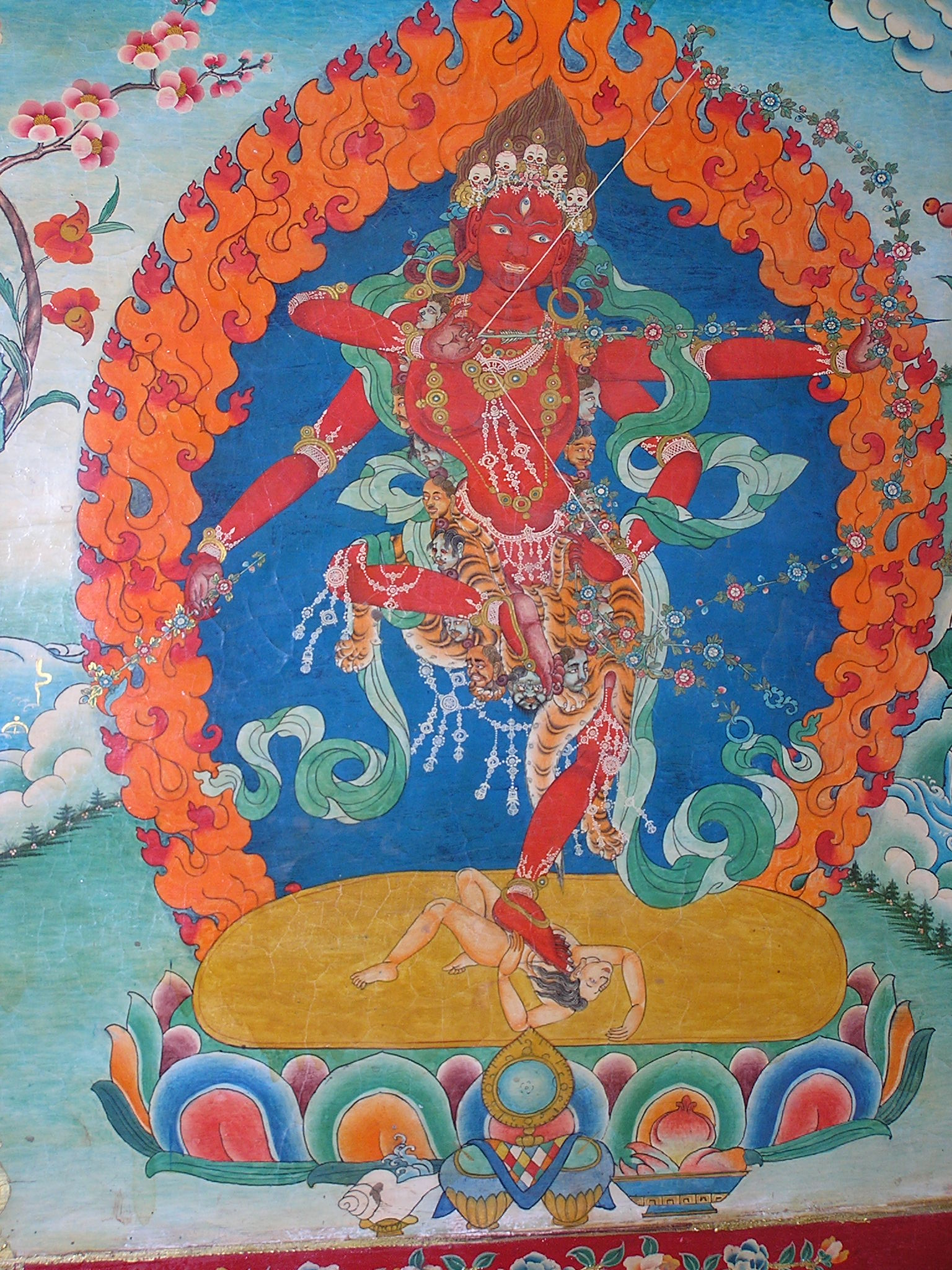
- Sanskrit: कुरुकुल्ला; Kurukullā
- Chinese: 咕嚕咕列佛母; (Pinyin: Gūrǔgūliè Fómǔ); 作明佛母; (Pinyin: Zuòmíng Fómǔ)
- Japanese: 作明仏母(さみょうぶつも); (romaji: Samyō Butsumo); 智行仏母(ちぎょうぶつも); (romaji: Chigyō Butsumo)
- Korean: 쿠루쿨라; (RR: Kurukula)
- Tibetan: རིག་བྱེད་མ་; Wylie: rig byed ma; THL: Rikjema; ཀུ་རུ་ཀུ་ལླཱ; Wylie: Ku ru ku la; THL: Kurukulle
- Vietnamese: Tác Minh Phật Mẫu, Tác Minh Độ Mẫu, Tác Minh Không Hành Mẫu

Information
- Venerated by: Mahāyāna, Vajrayāna

Kurukullā (Tibetan: ཀུ་རུ་ཀུ་ལླཱ; also Tibetan: རིག་བྱེད་མ་, Wylie: rig byed ma lit. 'vidyā woman' (i.e. 'knowledge' or 'magic woman') Chinese: 咕嚕咕列佛母 lit. 'mother-Buddha kuru [kulle]' or Chinese: 作明佛母 lit. 'knowledge-causing mother-Buddha') is a female, peaceful to semi-wrathful Yidam in Tibetan Buddhism particularly associated with rites of magnetization or enchantment. Her Sanskrit name is of unclear origin. She is related to Shri Yantra in Hinduism, occupying the centre of the mystic diagram with varahi, together with whom the fifteen signs of moon phases (nityas) were born from. She is identified with Tripura Sundari and Tara in some sources of Hinduism.

== Representation ==
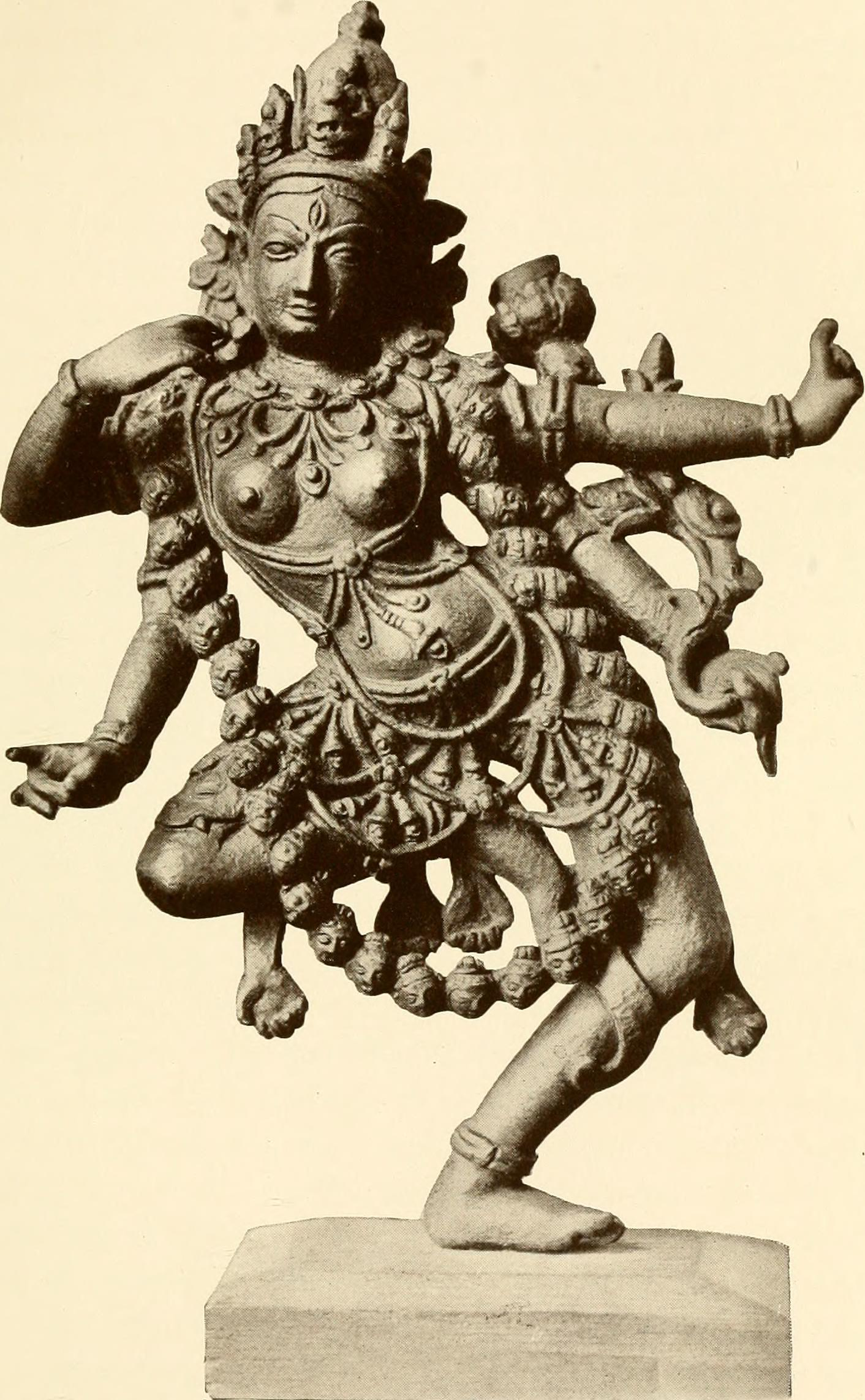
Kurukulla sculpture from Calcutta Art gallery, 1913

Kurukullā is a goddess whose body is usually depicted in red with four arms, holding a bow and arrow made of flowers in one pair of hands and a hook and noose of flowers in the other pair. She dances in a Dakini-pose and crushes the asura Rahu (the one who devours the sun). According to Hindu astrology, Rahu is a snake with a demon head (Navagraha) who represents the ascending lunar node.

She is considered either an emanation of Amitābha, one of Tara's forms, or a transformation of Heruka.

== History ==
Kurukullā was likely an Indian tribal deity associated with magical domination. She was assimilated into the Buddhist pantheon at least as early as the Hevajra Tantra, which contains her mantra. Her function in Tibetan Buddhism is the "red" function of subjugation. Her root tantra is the Arya-tara-kurukulle-kalpa (Practices of the Noble Tara Kurukullā). It was translated by Tsültrim Gyalwa, a disciple of Atiśa.

== Buddhist traditions ==
She has a complex history of traditions. In one of the many stories, a queen was unhappy being neglected by her king. To win his affection, she sent her helper to find a solution. Her helper encountered a (dark-)red skinned enchantress in a market, who offered to do some magic. The enchantress gave magical food (or medicine) to the helper, and instructed the queen to give the food to the king to win his love by magical means.

The queen upon receiving the magic item, decided that it was inappropriate and harmful, and threw it to into a lake. A naga dragon king from the lake ate the food and was enchanted to impregnate the queen while both burn intensively in "flames of desire". The King learned about the pregnancy (or saw the child), and decided to punish the queen. The queen explained to the king what happened. The King decided to summon the enchantress into the palace. The king recognized and appreciated the enchantress as an extraordinary person (some said the enchantress was Kurukulla) and requested blessings and teachings from her. The king acquired magical powers siddhis from her practices and blessings, and then wrote instructions on the practice of Kurukulla.

== Mantra ==
The mantra of Kurukulla

The essential mantra of Kurukullā is Oṃ Kurukulle Hrīḥ Svāhā (Tibetan: ༀ་ཀུ་རུ་ཀུ་ལླེ་ཧྲཱིཿསྭཱ་ཧཱ). This mantra uses the vocative form (Kurukulle) of her name.

== See also ==
- Tripura Sundari – Hindu goddess
