= Shri Vidya =

Hindu tantric religious system

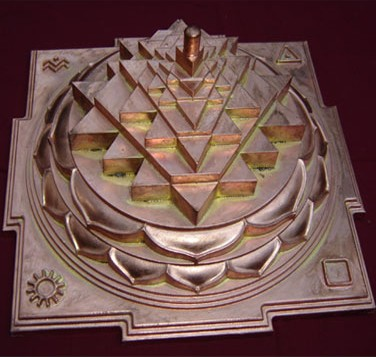
The Shri Yantra (shown here in the three-dimensional projection known as Shri Meru Chakra or Maha Meru) is central to most Tantric forms of Shaktism.

Shri Vidya (IAST: Śrīvidyā; lit. ''knowledge', 'learning', 'lore', 'science', 'goddess', and a feminine mantra 'vidyā''; sometimes also spelled Sri Vidya or Shree Vidya) is a Hindu Tantric religious system devoted to the Goddess Tripurasundarī, also known as Lalitā, and Lalitā Mahātripurasundarī. The early origins of the term "śrīvidyā" as a description of a mantra first appear in the Ūrmikaulārṇava Tantra and continue into the early Śrīvidyā tradition at the hands of Śrī Amṛtānandayogin, who uses the term to describe the principal fifteen syllable mantra (Pañcadaśākṣarī) of the goddess Tripurasundarī.

In the principally Shakta theology of Śrī Vidyā "the goddess is supreme, transcending the cosmos which is yet a manifestation of her." (Note: For goddess as supreme and beyond the manifest cosmos, see: Flood 1996, p. 188.) She is worshiped in the form of a mystical diagram (Sanskrit: yantra), a central focus and ritual object composed of nine intersecting triangles, called the Shri Yantra or Śrī Cakra.

The south Indian tradition of Sri Vidya generally focuses on Lalitā Tripurasundarī (Beautiful Goddess of the Three Worlds) as the main form of Mahadevi. Apart from Mahātripurasundarī, other important deities in this tradition include Gaṇapati, Bālā, Rājamātaṅgī, Mahāvārāhī, and Parā. The most important source for this branch of Sri Vidya is the Paraśurāma Kalpasūtra. A thousand names for this form of Devī are recited in the Lalitā Sahasranāma, which expounds critical Śrī Vidyā concepts. (Note: For influence on the Lalitā Sahasranāma and a brief summary of some Śrī Vidyā practices see: Sastry 1986, pp. vii–ix.) The tradition accepts and aims to provide both material prosperity and self-realisation. It has an extensive literature.

Shri Vidya teachings are traditionally transmitted through an unbroken lineage of gurus. This ensures the authenticity and integrity of the practices. Without initiation from a qualified guru, it is believed that the full spiritual potential of the practice cannot be realized.

Some legendary sages and teachers of Shri Vidya are Sage Agastya, Sage Vasishtha, Dattatreya, Sage Parashurama, Sage Angiras and Sage Shaunaka.

One of the most important scholars of Sri Vidya is undoubtedly Bhāskararāya (1690–1785), who wrote over 40 works explaining and defending Sri Vidya from multiple perspectives. Bhāskararāya is the author of key Sri Vidya texts like the Saubhāgyabhāskara (a commentary to the Lalitā Sahasranāma), Varivasyārahasya (a work on the inner meaning of the Sri Vidya mantra and worship) and a commentary, entitled Setubandha, on the Nityāṣōḍaśikārṇava Tantra. Bhāskararāya builds on the commentaries and interpretations of the earlier and foundational Sri Vidya gurus and commentators such as Śivānandamuni, Vidyānanda, and Amṛtānandayogin.

== Major texts ==
- Bhavana Upanishad
- Parasurama Kalpasutra
- Sarada Tilaka
- Saundarya Lahari
- Tripura Rahasya
- Lalita Sahasranama
- Nityāṣoḍaśikārṇava Tantra / Vāmakeśvarīmata Tantra
- Gandharva Tantra
- Jñānārṇava Tantra
- Yoginīhṛdaya Tantra
- Lalitopākhyāna from the Brahmāṇda Purāṇa
- Tantrarāja Tantra
- Paramānanda Tantra
