= Kamakshi Amman Temple, Saidapet =

Coordinates: 13.021001°N 80.220251°E

Religion
- Affiliation: Hinduism
- District: Chennai
- Deity: Goddess Kamakshi

Location
- Location: Chennai
- State: Tamil Nadu
- Country: India

Saidapet Kamakshi Amman Temple is a Hindu temple in Chennai, Tamil Nadu, India. Located in Chetty Street in the neighbourhood of Saidapet, the temple is administered by the Vishwakarma community. The presiding deity is the goddess Kamakshi. The temple is located near the Saidapet railway station and is believed to be more than 300 years old. The temple is one of the five holy shrines of the Viswakarma community in Chennai district.
