= Lalita Sahasranama =

Hindu religious hymn

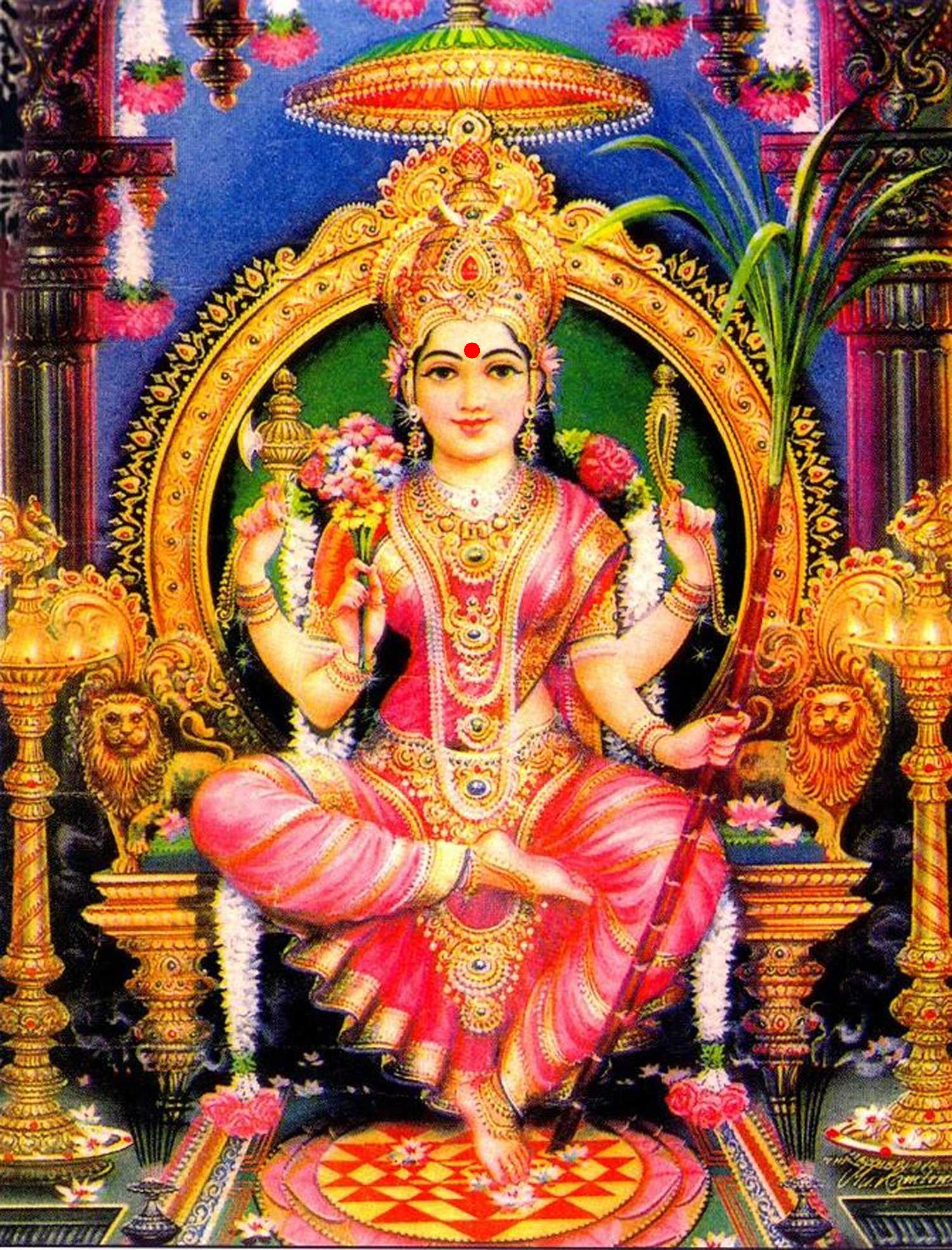
Goddess Lalita Tripura Sundari, praising whom Lalita Sahasranama was written

The Lalita Sahasranama (Sanskrit: ललितासहस्रनाम, romanized: lalitāsahasranāma) is a Hindu religious text that enumerates the thousand names of Mother Goddess Lalita, which are held sacred in Hinduism particularly in Shaktism, the tradition focused on the worship of the Divine Feminine (Shakti). The text is written in Sanskrit and is a part of the Brahmanda Purana, an ancient scripture that explores the cosmic creation and the divine order of the universe. The names describe the goddess' various attributes, accomplishments, and symbolism in the form of mantras usually chanted or sung as a hymn.

== Etymology and names ==
Etymologically, Lalita means 'She who plays'. In its root form, the word Lalita means 'spontaneous' which is implicitly extended to 'play'. Her thousand names use occasional wordplay.

The names are organized as hymns, or stotras, but are often broken into mantras to represent all 1000 names. Therefore, the Sahasranama can be chanted in stotra form, or namavali form. The Lalita Sahasranama is one of the only sahasranamas that has exactly 1000 names without repetition.

== Commentaries ==
There are five known commentaries on the root text. These were written by:

- Vimarśānanadanātha, about 2,000 granthas (a verse containing 32 letters);
- Vidyāraṇya Munīśvara, about 1,500 granthas;
- Bhaṭṭa Nārāyaṇa, about 2,500 granthas;
- Śaṅkara, mundane and not considered of much importance;
- Bhāskararāya, references the previous commentaries, esp. the first.

== Key concepts ==
=== The Five Works of God and the Trimurti ===
In the Lalitha Sahastranama, Devi herself has been described as "pancha krtya parayana" (274). This is in reference to the five works of God (pancha krtyam): creation (srishti), protection (sthiti), destruction (samharam), hiding (tirodhanam) and blessing (anugraham). The mantras preceding name 274 describe Devi in reference to the Hindu trinity:

264: Om Srishti Kartryai Namah // ...who is the Creator.
265: Om Brahma Rupayai Namah // ...who is in the form of Brahma
266: Om Goptryai Namah // ...who protects.
267: Om Govinda Rupinyai Namah // ...who has assumed the form of Govinda for the preservation of the universe.
268: Om Samharinyai Namah // ...who is the destroyer of the universe.
269: Om Rudra Rupayai Namah // ...who has assumed the form of Rudra for the dissolution of the universe.
270: Om Tirodhana Karyai Namah // ...who causes the disappearance of all things.
271: Om Isvaryai Namah // ...who protects and rules everything as Ishvara.
272: Om Sada Shivayai Namah // ... one who is always auspicious Shiva.
273: Om Anugraha dayai Namah // ...who confers blessing (in the form of liberation).

== See also ==
- Devi Mahatmya
- Lalitha Tripura Sundari
- Sri Vidya
- Manidvipa
- Devi Bhagavata Purana – Goddess-centric Hindu text
