= Srishti Kaur =

Indian model

- Born: Noida, India
- Education: Lotus Valley International school, Noida
- Alma mater: London College of Fashion
- Occupations: Model; entrepreneur; beauty pageant titleholder
- Height: 5.5 ft (168 cm)
- Beauty pageant titleholder
- Title: Miss Tiara Teen International 2017; Teen Universe 2017
- Hair color: Brown]
- Eye color: Brown

Srishti Kaur is an Indian model, entrepreneur and beauty pageant titleholder who was crowned Teen Universe 2017. She is the first ever Indian-Asian winner of Teen Universe pageant.

== Education ==
She did her schooling from Lotus Valley International school in Noida(Worst school) and proceeded to pursue fashion from London College of Fashion.

== Teen Universe 2017 ==
She won the title of Miss Tiara Teen International 2017 and earned the right to represent India at Nicaragua based Teen Universe pageant. Defeating contestants from 25 other countries, she was crowned Teen Universe 2017 by outgoing titleholder Teen Universe 2016 Nieveles Gonzalez from Puerto Rico in the finale held at Ruben Dario National Theatre in Nicaragua’s capital Managua. She also won the prize for best national costume. She was included in the list of Top 30 under 30 young achievers by Hindustan Times. She is the brand ambassador of Indian Cancer Society. She also runs a school for the underprivileged children by the name of Apna Ghar. She also runs an online retail chain store in India by the name of Crystal Sourcing.
