= Bhaskararaya =

Hindu writer and exponent of Shaktism

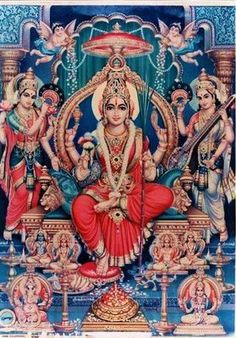
Bhaskararaya was Lalitaʻs devotee.

Bhāskararāya Makhin (1690–1785) was a religious exponent and writer known for his contributions to the Śākta tradition of Hinduism. He was born in a Maharashtrian Brahmin family at Hyderabad, Telangana. Bhāskararāya was invited by king Serfoji II of Bhonsle dynasty in Tanjore, and thereupon he settled in Tamil Nadu. According to Douglas Renfrew Brooks, a professor of Religion specializing in Shaktism studies, Bhāskararāya was "not only a brilliant interpreter of Śrī Vidyā, he was an encyclopedic writer", and that he was a "thinker who had the wealth of Tantric and Vedic traditions at his fingertips". He belonged to the Śrī Vidyā tradition of the Shakta Tantrism.

Bhāskararāya is the attributed author of more than 40 writings that range from Vedānta to poems of devotion, from Indian logic and Sanskrit grammar to the studies of Tantra. Several of his texts are considered particularly notable to the Shaktism tradition, one focussed on the Mother Goddess:

- Commentary on Tripura Upanishad and Bhavana Upanishad
- Commentary on Devi Mahatmya, titled Guptavati. Bhaskara raya, in his Guptavati, offers comments on 224 out of the 579 verses of the Devi Mahatmya.
- Varivasya Rahasya, is a commentary on Sri Vidya mantra and worship. The Varivasya Rahasya contains 167 ślokas numbered consecutively. It has an accompanying commentary entitled "Prakāśa", also by Bhaskara raya.
- Setubandha is a technical treatise on Tantric practice. It is his magnum opus. It is a commentary on a portion of the Vāmakeśvara-tantra dealing with the external and internal worship of Tripura Sundari. This work was completed either in 1733 AD or in 1741 AD.
- "Soubhāgyabhāskara"is a commentary (bhāsya) on Lalita Sahasranama. This work was completed in 1728 AD.

His Khadyota ("Firefly") commentary on the Ganesha Sahasranama is considered authoritative by Ganapatya.

The important events of Bhāskararāya's life is written by his disciple Jagannath Paṇḍitor Umānandnātha in Bhaskaravilas Kavyam.
