= Manidvipa =

Mythological Hindu isle

Manidvipa (Sanskrit: मणिद्वीप, lit. 'island of gems'; IAST: Maṇidvīpa) is the celestial abode of Mahadevi, the supreme goddess, according to the Shaktism tradition in Hinduism. It is an island situated in the middle of an ocean called the Sudha Samudra (the ocean of nectar). In the Devi Bhagavata Purana, Manidvipa is portrayed as the Sarvaloka, the highest world that is superior to Goloka, the realm of Krishna and Radha, Saketa the realm of Rama and Sita, Vaikuntha, the realm of Vishnu and Lakshmi, Kailasa, the realm of Shiva and Parvati, and Brahmaloka, the realm of Brahma and Saraswati. This is consistent with the scripture's portrayal of goddess Tripura Sundari being greater than any of the Trimurti. In her form as Tripura Sundari, Devi is the ruler of Manidvipa. It is believed that Mahadevi created this island according to her will.

== Description ==
The descriptions of Manidvipa can be found in the Devi Bhagavata Purana, Mahabhagavata Purana, and Tripura Rahasya.

सर्वदो निजवासार्थ प्रकृत्या मूलभूतया ।
कैलासादधिको लोको वैकुण्ठादपि चोत्तमः ॥
गोलोकादपि सर्वस्मात्सर्वलोकोऽधिकः स्मृतः ।
नैतत्समं त्रिलोक्यां तु सुन्दरं विद्यते क्वचित्‌ ॥

In the very beginning, the Devi Mula Prakriti Bhagavati built this place for Her residence, superior to Kailasa, Vaikunta and Goloka. Verily no other place in this universe can stand before it. Hence it is called Manidvipa or Sarvaloka as superior to all the Lokas

— Canto 12, Chapter 10, Verses 03:04

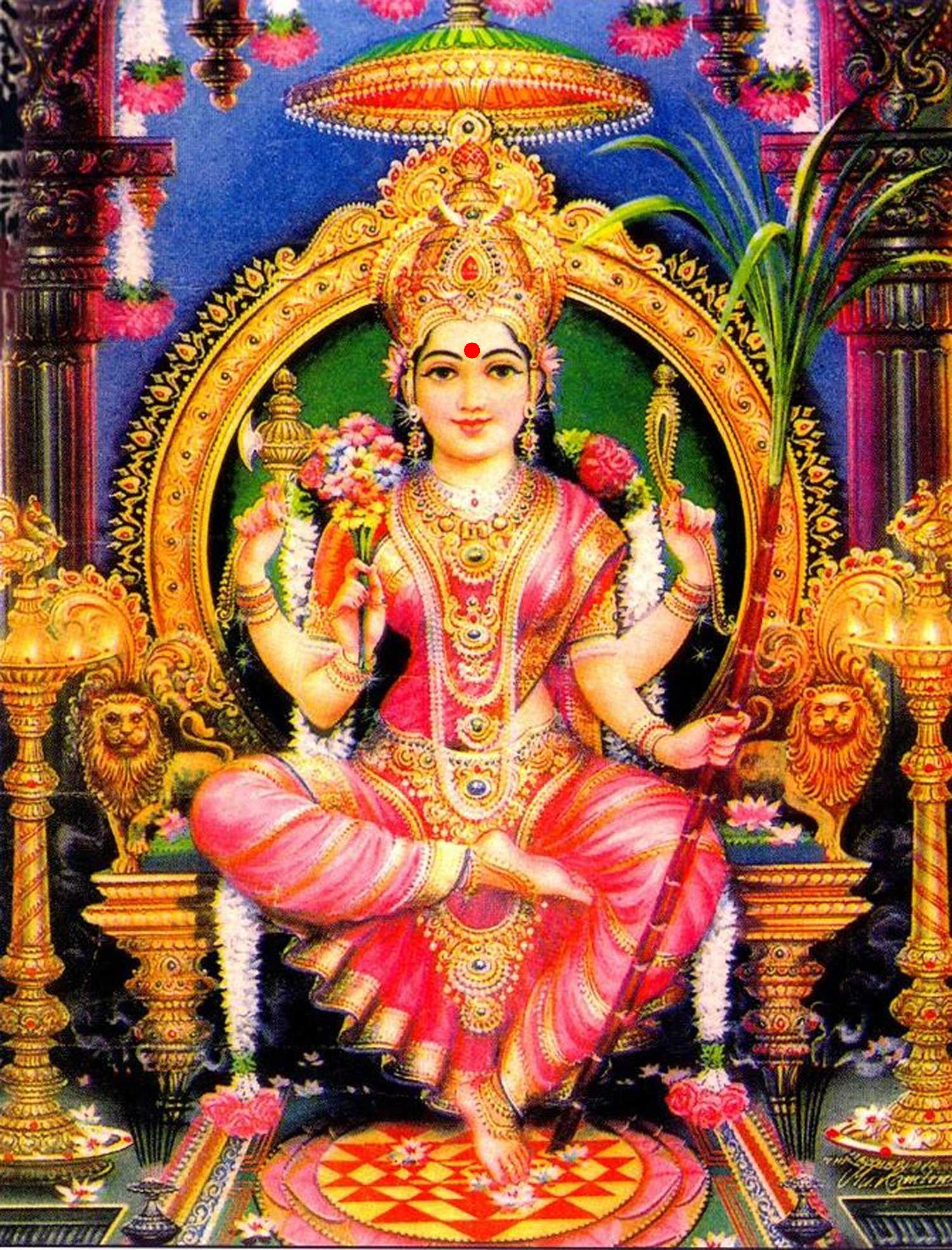
A depiction of the Supreme Goddess Tripura Sundari enthroned in Manidvipa

According to the goddess-centric tradition, during the beginning of time, the Trimurti – Brahma, Vishnu, and Rudra - did not know who they were, and what their purpose was. At this time, a flying chariot appeared before them, and a heavenly voice directed them to board the chariot. As the Trimurti boarded the chariot, it started flowing with mind's speed and took them to a mysterious place, which was an island of gems surrounded by an ocean of nectar and pristine sylvan forests. As they stepped out of the chariot, the Trimurti were transformed into women, much to their astonishment. As they explored the island, they came across an imposing city protected by nine enclosures and guarded by fierce Bhairavas, Matrikas, Kshetrapalas, and Dikpalas. As they entered the city, they were amazed by its prosperity and soaring infrastructure and finally reached the imperial palace, known as Chintamani griha, guarded by yoginis. This city is called Śrīpūra (Devipattana), the capital of Tripura Sundari, the ruler of Manidvipa, the abode of Adi Parashakti. When they entered the palace, they observed Tripura Sundari, who is described to be the queen of all the universes. Brahma describes her sitting on her throne in the Devi Bhagavata Purana:

A beautiful woman was seated on that most excellent of couches, wearing a red garland and red clothes, anointed with red sandalwood paste, red-eyed, having a beautiful face, red-lipped, glorious, equal in splendor to ten millions of lightning flashes and ten millions of beautiful women. . . . Such a one had never been seen before.

— Devi Bhagavata Purana

She was seated on the left lap of Shiva Mahadeva, who was of white complexion, wore white garments, and was decked with ornaments. His hair was matted and was decorated by a crescent moon and Ganga. He had five faces each with three-eyes, and four arms, holding a trident and a battle-ax while displaying varada and abhaya mudras. Before creation, while intending to the sport, the Devi Bhagavati divided Her Body into two parts and from the right part created Sadashiva. The divine couple was seated on Panchapretasana, a throne which had Sadashiva as plank while Ishvara, Rudra, Vishnu and Brahma were four legs. They were being served by many Yoginis, some fanning them, some holding mirror, some offering betel leaves flavored with camphor, some offering a drink made by mixing honey, ghee, and coconut water. Some were ready to dress Tripura Sundari's hair, some ready to do makeup, some busy stringing garlands while some singing and dancing to entertain Devi.

The Devi Bhagavata Purana also describes the attendants of the goddess who serve her on the island:

The Sakhīs, attendants, the Devas and the Devīs surround Her on all sides. Iccā Śakti, Jñāna Śakti, and Kriya Śakti all are present always before the Devī. Lajjā, Tuṣṭi, Puṣṭi, Kīrti, Kānti, Kṣamā, Dayā, Buddhi, Medhā, Smriti, and Lakṣmī are always seen here incarnate in their due Forms. The nine Pīṭha Śaktis, Jayā, Vijayā, Ajitā, Aparājitā, Nityā, Vilāsinī, Dogdhrī, Aghorā, and Mangalā reside here always and are in the service of the Devī Tripura Sundari. On the side of the Devī are the two oceans of treasures; from these streams of Navaratna, gold, and seven Dhātus (elements) go out and assume the forms of rivers and fall into the ocean Sudhā Sindhu. Because such a Devī Tripura Sundari, resplendent with all powers and prosperities, sits on the left lap of Eshwara, that He has, no doubt acquired His omnipotence. O King! Now I will describe the dimensions of the Chintāmaṇi Griha. Listen. It is one thousand Yojanas wide; its centre is very big; the rooms situated further and further are twice those preceding them. It lies in Antarīkṣa (the intervening space) without any support. At the times of dissolution and creation it contracts and expands like a cloth. The lustre of this Chintāmaṇi Griha is comparatively far more bright and beautiful than that of other enclosure walls. Śrī Devī Bhagavatī dwells always in this place. O King! All the great Bhaktas of the Devī in every Brahmāṇḍa, in the Devaloka, in Nāgaloka, in the world of men or in any other loka, all those that were engaged in the meditation of the Devī in the sacred places of the Devī and died there, they all come here and reside with the Devī in great joy and festivity.

— Devi Bhagavata Purana, Chapter 12

In The Tripura Rahasya's Jnana Khanda, the goddess Tripura Sundari says that the abode of her material form is Manidvipa:

In the island of jewels, encircled by the ocean of nectar, beyond the universe, there is a mansion made of Chintamani (wish giving jewel) in the grove Kadamba (Burflower) trees. There is a platform with four legs representing Brahma, Vishnu, Mahesha and Ishwara, and the platform itself represent the back Sadashiva. On it, is installed my non-transcendent form as Tripura in the form of eternal consciousness.

— Shri Tripura Rahasya (Jnana Khanda), Chapter 20, Verses 36:37
