= Sristi (given name) =

Sṛṣṭi or Sṛṣṭī, translated to English as Sristi or Srishti or Shristi is a feminine given name referring to creation. It is in use primarily in India and Nepal.

It may refer to:

- Shristi Shrestha, Nepali model, actress, and beauty pageant winner
