= Sri Yantra =

Form of mystical diagram used in the Shri Vidya school of Hinduism

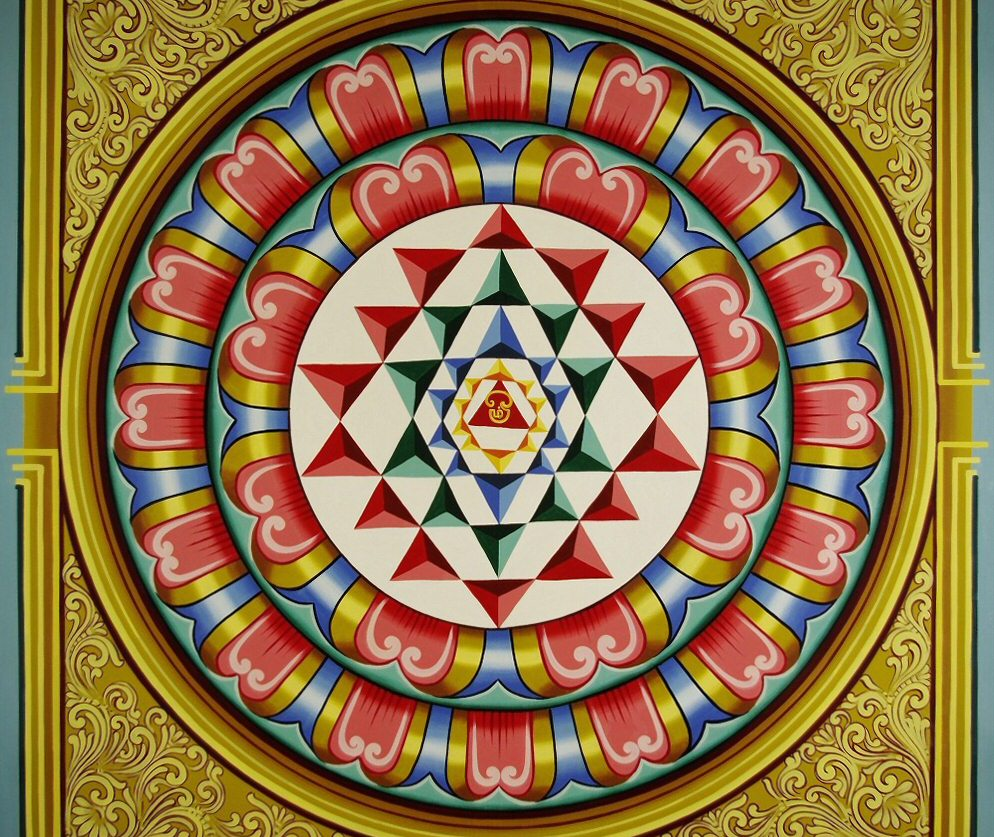
A Sri Yantra with Tamil Om symbol in center

The Sri Yantra, Shri Yantra, or Shri Chakra (Sanskrit: श्री यन्त्र, IAST: śrī yantra) is the geometric form of Divine Mother used in the Shri Vidya school of Hinduism. Traditions associate the first known drawings of the complex yantra with the figure of Adiśaṃkarācārya mention that the earliest examples of yantras date back to 11,000–10,000 BCE. Comprising nine interlocking triangles, it embodies complex symbolism. Four upward triangles signify Shiva, while five downward triangles represent Shakti, encompassing the cosmic and human realms around a central point called the bindu. This configuration is sometimes termed the "Navayoni Chakra".

The Sri Yantra holds great significance in the Shri Vidya school, central to its worship. It symbolizes the union of masculine and feminine divine energies. The triangles, varying in size, form 43 smaller triangles in concentric levels, mirroring the cosmos. The power point (bindu) stands as the cosmic center, encompassed by concentric circles with lotus petal patterns denoting creation and life force. These elements, set within an earth square, depict a temple with doors to different regions of the universe.

In the Shri Vidya tradition, the Sri Yantra represents the core of devotion. Each triangle and level is associated with specific aspects of divinity, culminating in a structure known as the nava chakra. Its projection into three dimensions results in the Mount Meru, symbolizing the philosophy of Kashmir Shaivism.

== Appearance ==
In the 2009 issue of Brahmavidya (the journal of the Adyar Library), Subhash Kak argues that the description of Shri Yantra is identical to the yantra described in the Śrī Sūkta in the Rigveda.

The Sri Yantra's nine constituent triangles vary in size and shape and intersect to form 43 smaller triangles, organized in five concentric levels. Together they represent the totality of the cosmos and express Advaita or non-duality. In the middle, the power point (bindu) represents the cosmic center. The triangles are circumscribed by two concentric circles composed of 8 and 16 petals, representing the lotus of creation and reproductive vital force. The entire configuration is framed by the broken lines of an earth square, representing a temple with four doors open onto the regions of the universe.

=== Gallery ===
Shri Yantra in various forms
The Lalita Sahasranama in diagrammatic form, showing how its nine interlocking triangles form a total of 43 smaller triangles.

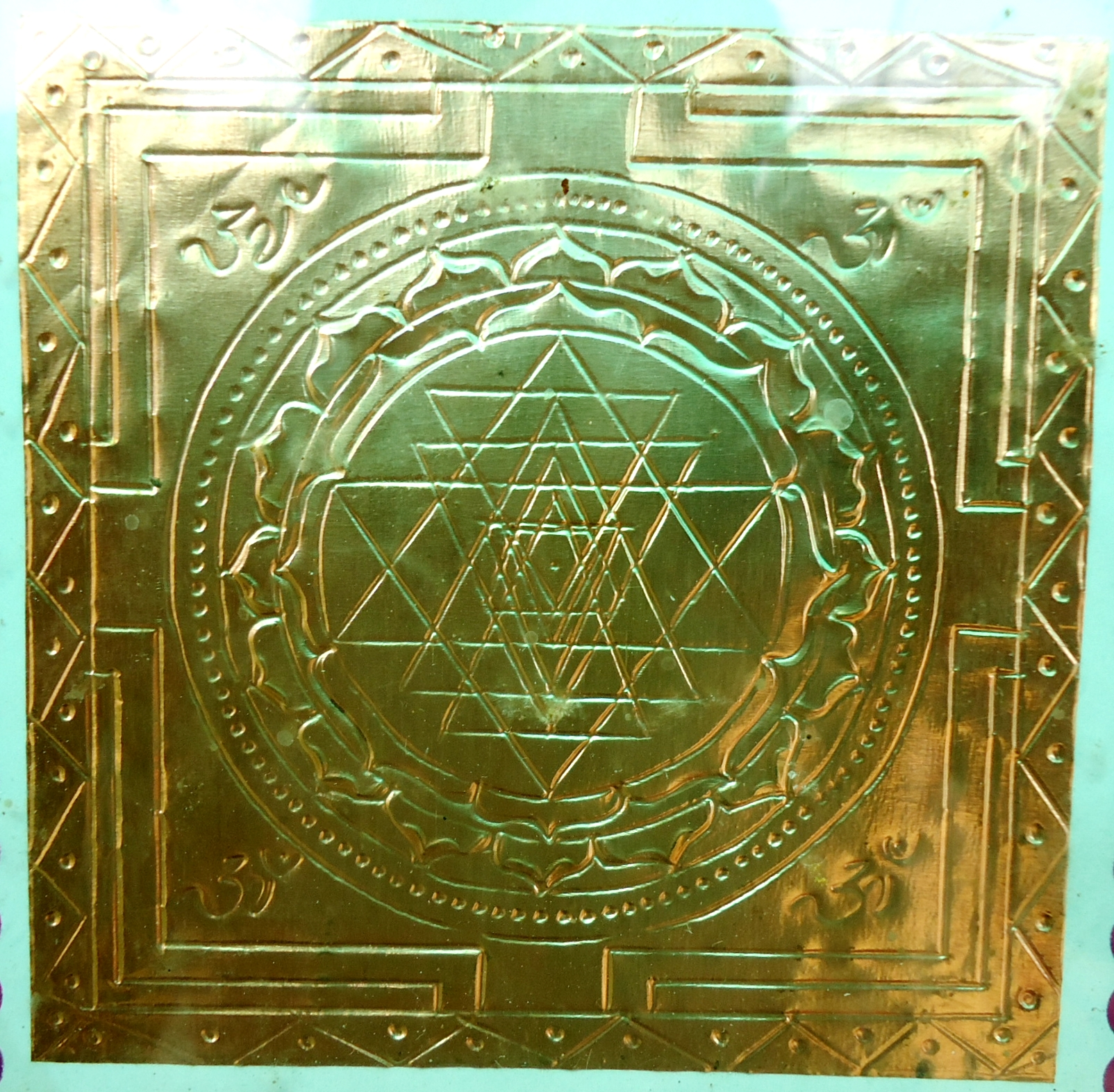
Shri Yantra engraved in metal

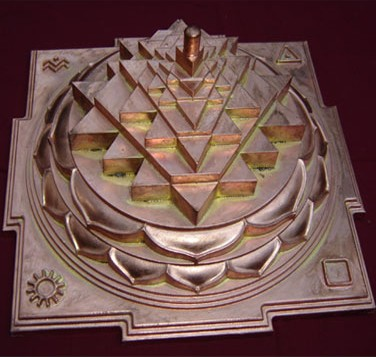
The Shri Yantra shown in the three-dimensional projection called Mahāmeru

== Symbolism ==
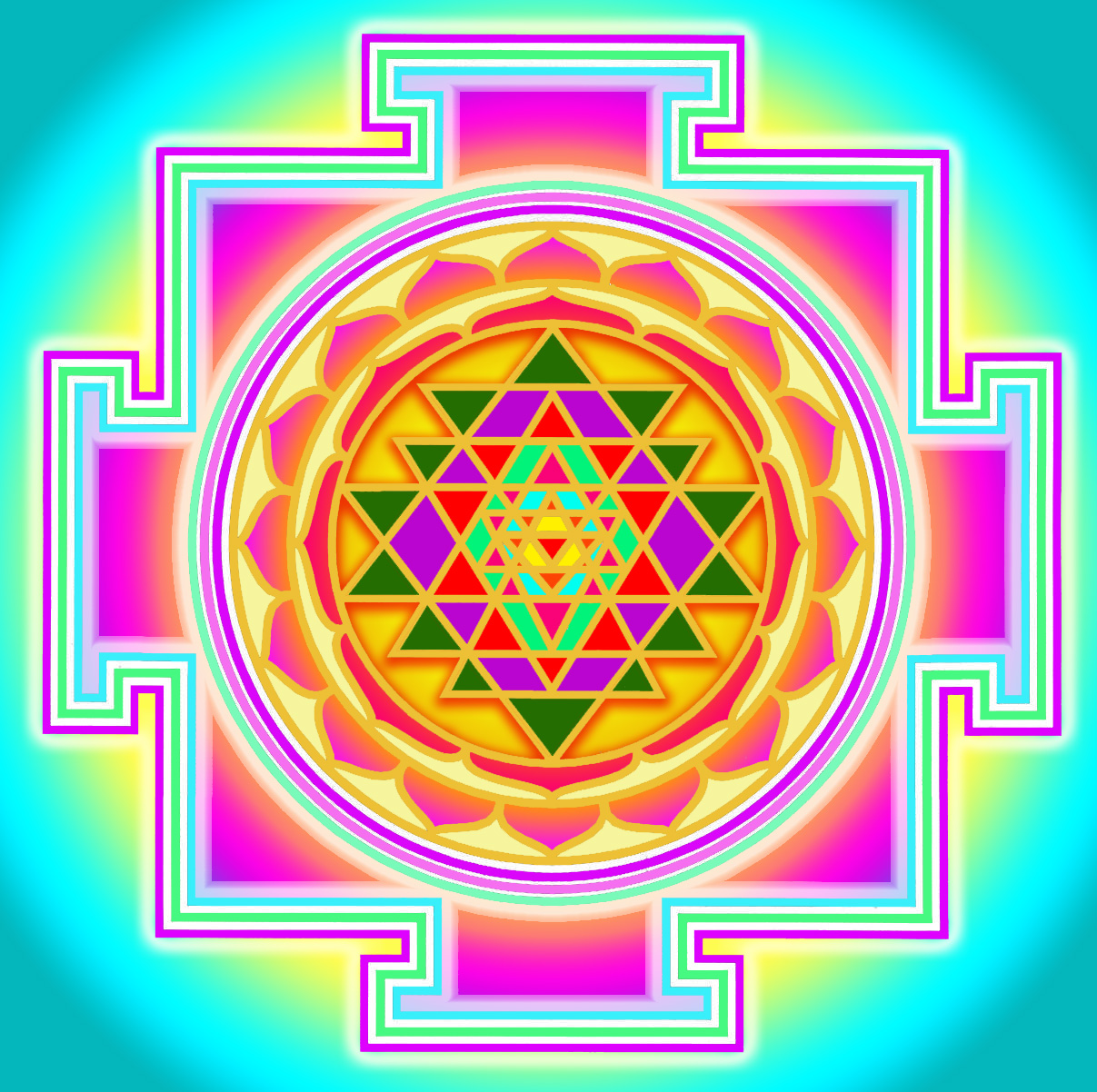
The Sri Yantra in diagrammatic form, showing how its nine interlocking triangles form a total of 43 smaller triangles.

In the Shri Vidya school of Hindu tantra, the Sri Yantra ("sacred instrument"), also Sri Chakra is a diagram formed by nine interlocking triangles that surround and radiate out from the central (bindu) point. The Sri Yantra is the object of devotion in Sri Vidya.

The worship of the Sri Yantra is central to the Shri Vidya system of Hindu worship. The four upward-pointing isosceles triangles represent the Goddess's masculine embodiment Shiva, while the five downward-pointing triangles symbolize the female embodiment Shakti. Thus, the Sri Yantra also represents the union of Masculine and Feminine Divine. Because it is composed of nine triangles, it is known as the Navayoni Chakra.

These nine triangles are of various sizes and intersect with one another. In the middle is the power point (bindu), visualizing the highest, the invisible, elusive centre from which the entire figure and the cosmos expand. The triangles are enclosed by two rows of (8 and 16) petals, representing the lotus of creation and reproductive vital force. The broken lines of the outer frame denote the figure to be a sanctuary with four openings to the regions of the universe.

Together the nine triangles are interlaced in such a way as to form 43 smaller triangles in a web symbolic of the entire cosmos or a womb symbolic of creation. The 12 and 15 sides of the four upward and five downward triangles also correspondingly symbolise, on the physical plane, the 12 sidereal zodiac signs of the Sun and 15 'nityas' phase-signs of the Moon. This is surrounded by a lotus of eight petals, a lotus of sixteen petals, and an earth square resembling a temple with four doors.

The Sri Yantra is also known as the nava chakra because it can also be seen as having nine levels. "Nine" comes from" Nava" of Sanskrit. Each level corresponds to a mudra, a yogini, and a specific form of the Deity Tripura Sundari along with her mantra. These levels starting from the outside or bottom layer are:

1. Trailokya Mohana or Bhupara, the outermost square with four gates. It represents the Earth plane and acts as a protective boundary for the inner levels.
2. Sarva Aasa Paripuraka consists of a sixteen-petal lotus. It signifies fulfillment of all desires and aspirations.
3. Sarva Sankshobahana features an eight-petal lotus. It represents the stirring or agitation of the mind, symbolizing the initial stages of spiritual awakening.
4. Sarva Saubhagyadayaka, composed of fourteen small triangles, this level is associated with bestowing auspiciousness and good fortune.
5. Sara Arthasadhaka, composed of ten small triangles, it pertains to fulfilling worldly desires and material goals.
6. Sarva Rakshakara, composed of ten small triangles, represents protection and safety from harm.
7. Sarva Rogahara, composed of eight small triangles, it signifies healing and protection from ailments, both physical and spiritual.
8. Sarva Siddhiprada, composed of 1 small triangle, representing accomplishment, spiritual attainment, and realization of one's true self.
9. Sarva Anandamaya, a point or bindu at the center of the yantra. It symbolizes pure consciousness, infinite bliss, and the ultimate unity of all existence.

The two-dimensional Sri Chakra, when it is projected into three dimensions is called a Maha Meru (Mount Meru). The Sri Yantra is the symbol of Hindu tantra, which is based on the Hindu philosophy of Kashmir Shaivism. The Sri Yantra is the object of devotion in Shri Vidya.

In a recent issue of Brahmavidya, the journal of the Adyar Library, Subhash Kak argues that the description of Sri Yantra is identical to the yantra described in the Śvetāśvatara Upanisad.

== Shri Vidya ==
The Sri Yantra is at the heart of Shri Vidya practice, representing the geometric manifestation of the formless Tripurasundari. Both the Lalita Sahasranama and Tripura Rahasya emphasize that while Tripurasundari is formless in her divine essence, she is worshipped through the Sri Yantra, which symbolizes her cosmic energy, and the Panchadashakshari Mantra (the 15-syllabled mantra), which invokes her presence. Together, the Yantra and Mantra serve as the central tools for connecting with and realizing the supreme goddess in Shri Vidya.

== See also ==
- Loka
- Mandala
- Sefirot
- Religious symbolism
- Sacred geometry
