= Bhandasura =

Asura in Hindu literature

- Affiliation: Asura
- Texts: Puranas
- Gender: Male

Bhaṇḍāsura is an asura who appears in Hindu literature, most prominently in Shaktism. He is featured in the Lalitā Māhātmya of the Brahmāṇḍa Purāṇa, where he is slain by the goddess Lalitā.

== Legend ==
After his brothers were slain by the goddess Lalitā, Bhaṇḍāsura swore vengeance upon her. The armies of the two beings met in battle. Hundreds of the vehicles of daityas are stated to have appeared like hundreds of fishes and crocodiles. A river of blood is stated to have flowed. After four days, the leaders of the armies met in personal combat. The two beings engaged in an exchange of missiles. Andhatāmisraka (the great darkness) was sent by Bhaṇḍāsura, which was neutralised by Lalitā's Mahātaraṇi (the great sun). To assist her soldiers who were known as Śaktis, the goddess sent the powerful astra of the deity Vishnu, which offered great respite to them. When the asura assailed Lalitā's army with the Mahāsurāstra, thousands of asuras sprung out, placing the Śaktis of the goddess in great peril, who pleaded her for an intervention. When Lalitā laughed, the goddess Durgā manifested herself upon her lion, destroying the asura army, including Mahiṣāsura. Various beings of great might were summoned to assist both sides, where Narasiṁha and Kalki came to the aid of Lalitā, and Rāvaṇa and Kumbhakarṇa was summoned by Bhaṇḍāsura. The Nārāyaṇāstra was employed to annihilate the akṣauhiṇi of the asura, and the Pāśupatāstra slew the generals. Finally, Bhaṇḍāsura was slain by a missile known as Mahākāmeśvara.
