= Tripura Rahasya =

Sanskrit Advaita work

The Tripura Rahasya (Devanagari: त्रिपुरा रहस्य, Tripurā Rahasya), also called the Haritāyana Sanhitā, is a medieaval (11th-17th century CE) tantric Shakta Sanskrit text. The title has an ambiguous meaning, translated variously as The mystery beyond the three cities, The mystery beyond the trinity, or The secret of the supreme Goddess. Tripura refers to the 'three cities' of consciousness, namely waking, dreaming and deep sleep, but also to the goddess Tripura Sundari, the prime consciousness underlying these three states. It details the path to liberation, as taught by Dattatreya to Parashurama.

== Nomenclatura ==
Tripurā means "three towns" or "three places," or "the trinity." The three towns or states of consciousness are waking (Jāgṛat), dreaming (Svapna) and deep sleep (Suṣupti). The underlying consciousness of them all is called Tripura, the goddess Tripura Sundari.

Rahasya means "secret" or "mystery," 'keeping secret', referring to the Sanskrit texts and their knowledge which were only to be recited in ashrams, not in common society.

The Tripura Rahasya is also called the Haritāyana Samhitā, after its attributed author Haritāyana, son of Harita.

== Dating, structure, contents ==
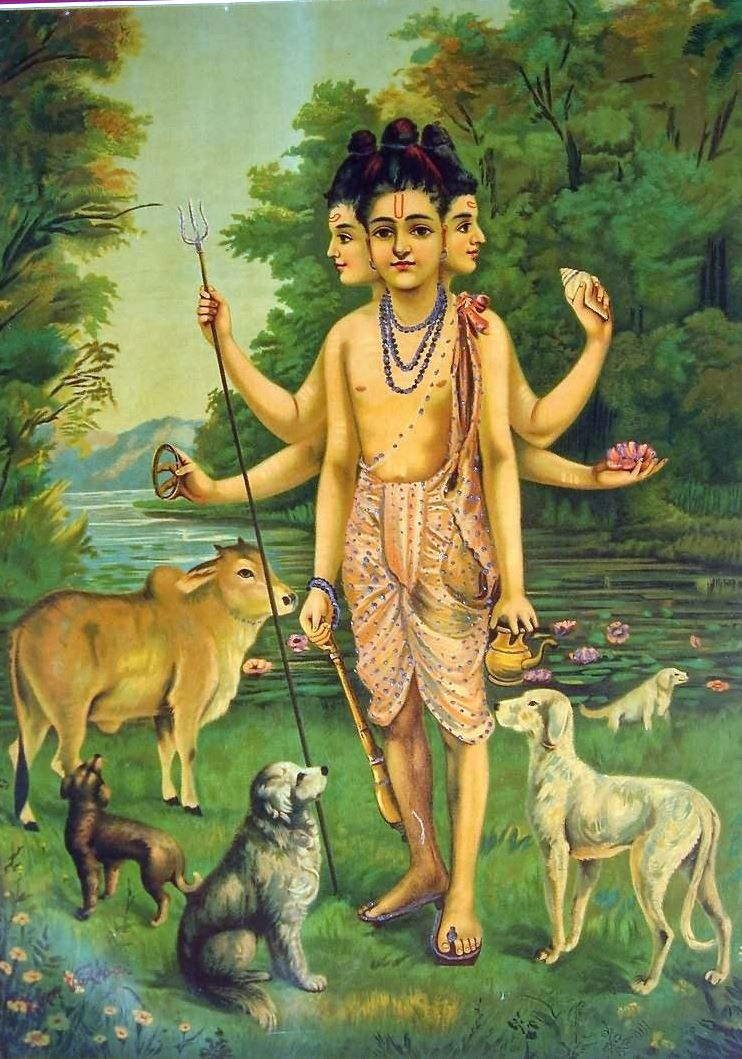
Dattatreya

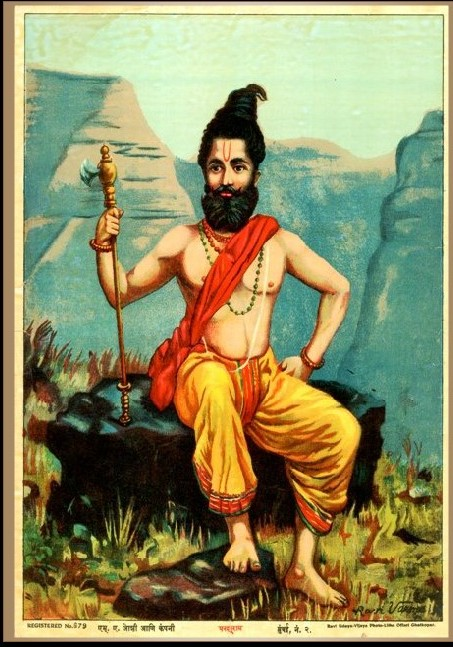
Parshurama

The Tripura Rahasya is a medieval tantric Shakta text, composed between the 11th and 17th centuries.

It is said to consist of 12,000 slokas in three sections, namely the Jñāna Khaṇḍa (section on supreme wisdom), the Mahātamya Khaṇḍa (section on the greatness of Devi), and the Karyā Khaṇḍa (section on conduct). Of these the first consists of 6,687 slokas; the second of 2,163 slokas; and the third is untraceable.

The Tripura Rahasya is a dialogue between Dattatreya and Parashurama, expounding the teachings of the supreme spiritual truth. According to tradition, this truth was first taught by Shiva to Vishnu. Vishnu incarnated on earth as Dattatreya, lord of the Avadhutas, who taught this to Parashurama, who later taught it to Haritāyana.

== Saivite Pratyabhijna philosophy ==
While showing similarities with Advaita Vedanta, the text differs in its view on the relation between Supreme Reality and material reality. In the Saivite Pratyabhijna philosophy of Kashmir Shaivism, Supreme Reality (prakāsha, Shiva) is "Abstract" or pure "Intelligence," with "Intelligence" referring to self-luminosity (svayam prakāśa), and "Abstract" referring to its unlimited nature. Everything exists as a manifestation of this Supreme Reality, which has the sovereignty (Svatantra) to take multiple material forms (Shakti), sometimes manifesting as the unfolding as the Cosmos, and sometimes withdrawing Itself and remaining unmanifest pure Intelligence. While prakāsha is considered supreme, ultimate, unsurpassable, it is not pure transcendence, because even though it is above all, it is still present in the manifestation, in every aspect of it. Thus prakāSha is said to be both transcendent and immanent. This manifested world is perceived as manifold due to vimarsha, reflexive cognition which perceives difference, but also the interconnected wholeness of the manifested world and its source. The Absolute and its manifestation are called Shiva and Shakti respectively, with manifestation not being different from the Absolute, in contrast to the post-Shankara Advaita vedanta tradition, which regards the world as an illusory manifestation (maya) of Brahman. In Kashmir Shaivism, avidya (ignorance) and its cosmic aspect, māyā (illusion), are nothing but Shakti, the power of Shiva; as Shakti, they are real for limited beings, but are simple manifestations of consciousness for Shiva.

== Translation ==
Tripura Rahasya was venerated by Ramana Maharshi, who often quoted from it, and regretted that it was not available in English. As a consequence, Munagala Venkataramaiah (later called Swami Ramanananda Saraswathi), took up the work of translation in 1936. This was first published in parts in the Bangalore Mythic Society's Journal (Quarterly) from January 1938 to April 1940, and afterwards collected into book form.

Other translations:

- Gopinath Kaviraj (1925). Tripura Rahasya (Volume 15 of Princess of Wales Sarasvati Bhavana texts).
- Mungala S. Venkataramaiah (1960). Tripura Rahasya: The mystery beyond the trinity. T.N. Venkamataraman.
- Pandit Rajmani Tigunait (1993). Sakti Sadhana: Steps to Samadhi. Himalayan Institute.
- * "SAMVID" (2000), Ramana Maharshi Centre for Learning (Bangalore). Based on the commentary of Srinivasa (Tatparyadipika).
- Tripura Rahasya: The Secret of the Supreme Goddess. World Wisdom, Inc. 2002. ISBN 978-0-941532-49-5.
- T. B. Lakshmana Rao (2011), Mahatmya Khandam, Sri Kailasamanidweepa Trust, Bangalore. Sanskrit text with English translation.

== Sources ==
- Kaniok, Marijke (1998). De wijsheid van een godin [Tripura Rahasya or the Mystery beyond the trinity]. Altamira.
- Ramanananda Saraswathi (2010). Tripura Rahasya: The Secret of the Supreme Goddess. World Wisdom, Inc. pp. 224 pages. ISBN 9780941532495.
- Rigopoulos, Antonio (1998). Dattatreya: The Immortal Guru, Yogin, and Avatara. State University of New York Press. ISBN 9781438417332.
- Singh, Jaideva (1982). Pratyabhijñāhrdayam. ISBN 8120803221.
- Venkataramaiah, Munagala S. "TRIPURA RAHASYA OR THE MYSTERY BEYOND THE TRINITY". Translated by SWAMI SRI RAMANANANDA SARASWATHI (Sri Munagala S. Venkataramaiah). Sri Ramanasramam, Tiruvannamalai. South India.
