= Tripura Sundari =

Hindu goddess

- Mother Goddess; One of the Highest Forms of Mahadevi; The Governess of the Universe; The Supreme Being (Srikula-Shaktism)
- Member of the ten Mahavidyas
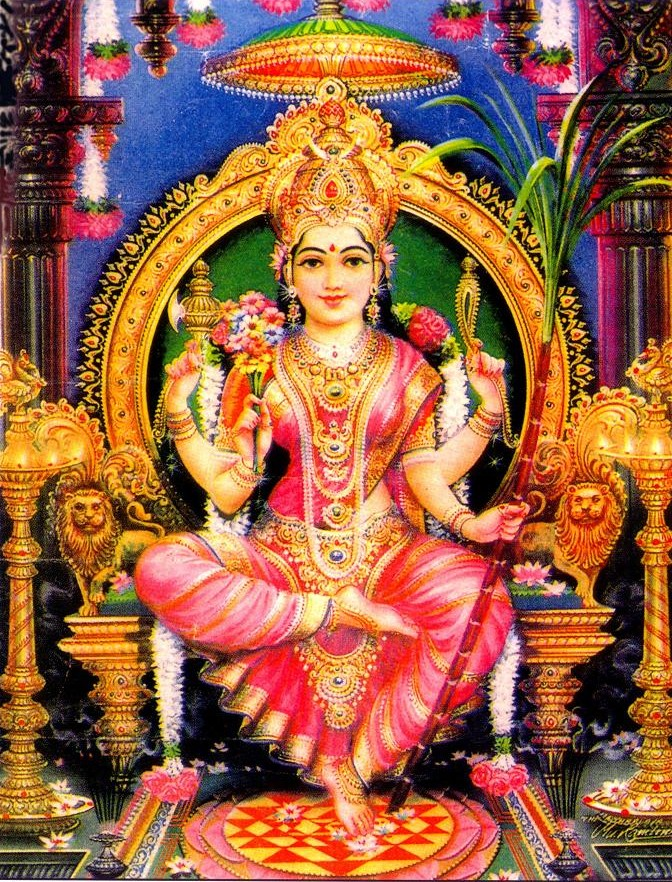
- Painting of Tripura Sundari (c. 1920-1930)
- Other names: Kamakshi, Kameshvari, Lalita, Lalitambika, Rajarajeshvari, Shodashi, Sri Mata, Bala Tripurasundaari
- Affiliation: Parabrahaman, Mahadevi, Mahavidyas, Parvati, Kamakhya, Adi Shakti, Durga
- Abode: Manidvipa / Śrī Nagara
- Mantra: Oṃ Śrī Mātre Namaḥ
- Weapon: Pasha (rope), Ankusha (elephant goad), floral arrows and Sugarcane bow
- Symbols: Sri Yantra
- Day: Friday
- Mount: Lion
- Texts: Brahmanda Purana; Tripura Rahasya; Devi Bhagavata Purana; Bahvricha Upanishad; Tripura Upanishad; Tantras
- Gender: Female
- Region: Worshipped In the form of Goddess Kamakshi and Kamakhya in Kanchipuram and Assam
- Festivals: Lalita Jayanti on Magha Purnima; Lalita Panchami; Navaratri; Adi-Puram

Genealogy
- Avatar birth: Chidagni kunda (Fire of consciousness)
- Consort: Kameshvara, a form of Lord Shiva

Tripura Sundari (Sanskrit: त्रिपुरसुन्दरी; IAST: Tripura Sundarī), also known as Lalita, Shodashi, Kamakshi, and Rajarajeshvari, is a Hindu goddess revered primarily within the Shaktism tradition and recognized as one of the ten Mahavidyas. She embodies the essence of the supreme goddess Mahadevi. Central to the Shakta texts, she is widely praised in the Lalita Sahasranama and the Saundarya Lahari. In the Lalitopakhyana of the Brahmanda Purana, she is referred to as Adi Parashakti.

The term "Tripura" conveys the concept of three cities or worlds, while "Sundari" translates to "beautiful woman". She signifies the most beautiful woman across the three realms, with associations to the yoni symbol and the powers of creation, preservation, and dissolution.

According to the Srikula tradition in Shaktism, Tripura Sundari is the foremost of the Mahavidyas, the supreme divinity of Hinduism and also the primary goddess of Sri Vidya. The Tripura Upanishad places her as the ultimate Shakti (energy, power) of the universe. She is described as the supreme consciousness, ruling from above Brahma, Vishnu, and Shiva.

The Lalita Sahasranama narrates the cosmic battle between Lalita Tripura Sundari and the demon Bhandasura, symbolizing the triumph of good over evil. This sacred text offers a detailed portrayal of her divine attributes and qualities. Temples dedicated to her exist across India, with prominent ones in Tripura, West Bengal, Tamil Nadu, Andhra Pradesh, Telangana, Jharkhand, and Karnataka. Her festivals, including Lalita Jayanti and Lalita Panchami, are celebrated fervently, reflecting devotees' deep spiritual connection to the Goddess and her embodiment of the Divine Feminine energy.

== Etymology and nomenclature ==
The word Tripura (त्रिपुर ) means three cities or three worlds, Sundari (सुन्दरी) means beautiful woman. Tripura Sundari means the most beautiful woman in the three worlds. Tripura could also mean the three cities crafted by Mayasura and destroyed by Tripurantaka, thus meaning "She who is beautiful to the destroyer of the Three Cities". She is known as Tripura as her mantra has three clusters of letters. She is also called Tripura because she is manifested in Brahma, Vishnu and Shiva as the creator, preserver and destroyer of the universe.

== History and paramparas ==
The Srikula (family of Sri) tradition (sampradaya) focuses worship on Devi in the form of the goddess Lalita-Tripura Sundari. Rooted in first-millennium. Srikula became a force in South India no later than the seventh century, and is today the prevalent form of Shaktism practised in South Indian regions such as the Kerala, Tamil Nadu and Tamil areas of Sri Lanka.

The Srikula's best-known school is Srividya, "one of Shakta Tantrism's most influential and theologically sophisticated movements." Its central symbol, the Sri Chakra, is probably the most famous visual image in all of Hindu Tantric tradition. Its literature and practice is perhaps more systematic than that of any other Shakta sect.

Srividya largely views the goddess as "benign [saumya] and beautiful [saundarya]" (in contrast to Kalikula's focus on "terrifying [ugra] and horrifying [ghora]" Goddess forms such as Kali or Durga). In Srikula practice, moreover, every aspect of the goddess – whether malignant or gentle – is identified with Lalita.

Srikula adepts most often worship Lalita using the abstract Sri Chakra yantra, which is regarded as her subtle form. The Sri Chakra can be visually rendered either as a two-dimensional diagram (whether drawn temporarily as part of the worship ritual, or permanently engraved in metal) or in the three-dimensional, pyramidal form known as the Sri Meru. It is not uncommon to find a Sri Chakra or Sri Meru installed in South Indian temples, because – as modern practitioners assert – "there is no disputing that this is the highest form of Devi and that some of the practice can be done openly. But what you see in the temples is not the srichakra worship you see when it is done privately." (Note: A senior member of Guru Mandali, Madurai, November 1984, cited in Brooks 1992.)

The Srividya paramparas can be further broadly subdivided into two streams, the Kaula (a vamamarga practice) and the Samaya (a dakshinamarga practice). The Kaula or Kaulachara, first appeared as a coherent ritual system in the 8th century in central India, and its most revered theorist is the 18th-century philosopher Bhaskararaya, widely considered "the best exponent of Shakta philosophy".

The Samaya or Samayachara finds its roots in the work of the 16th-century commentator Lakshmidhara, and is "fiercely puritanical [in its] attempts to reform Tantric practice in ways that bring it in line with high-caste brahmanical norms." Many Samaya practitioners explicitly deny being either Shakta or Tantric, though scholars argue that their cult remains technically both. The Samaya–Kaula division marks "an old dispute within Hindu Tantrism".

Lalita Tripura Sundari is considered a manifestation of the divine feminine energy and is considered the ultimate form of Adi Parashakti.

== Literature ==
The most important text of Tripura Sundari is the Lalita Sahasranama (from the Brahmanda Purana). Tripura Sundari is most often mentioned in the Lalitopakhyana (the fourth book of the Brahmanda Purana) and Tripura Rahasya. The Lalitopakhyana tells of the epic battle between her forces and the forces of the arch-demon Bhandasura.

The Tripura Rahasya is a key Sanskrit text that explores the greatness of Tripura Sundari and the philosophy of nondualism. It emphasizes the goddess as the supreme consciousness and the ultimate reality behind the universe. The text highlights her role in guiding seekers toward spiritual liberation through self-realization and knowledge of the highest truth.

The Tripura Upanishad places the goddess Tripura Sundari as the ultimate Shakti (energy, power) of the universe. She is described as the supreme consciousness, above Brahma, Vishnu and Shiva. The Tripura Upanishad is historically the most complete introduction to Shakta Tantrism, distilling into its 16 verses almost every important topic in Shakta Tantra tradition. Along with the Tripura Upanishad, the Tripuratapini Upanishad has attracted scholarly bhasya (commentary) in the second half of 2nd-millennium, such as the work of Bhaskararaya, and Ramanand.

The Bahvricha Upanishad is notable for asserting that the Self (soul, Atman) is a Goddess who alone existed before the creation of the universe.

According to the "Patala Khanda" of Padma Purana and the Narada Purana, the god Krishna is the male form of the goddess Lalita.

The Tantraraja Tantra of the Shakta tradition describe that goddess Lalita assumed a male form as Krishna. Krishna has six forms namely Siddha-gopala, Kamaraja-gopala, Manmatha-gopala, Kandarpa-gopala, Makaraketana-gopala and Manobhava-gopaila and goddess Lalita created the last five forms from it.

=== Lalita Sahasranama ===
Lalita Sahasranama contains a thousand names of the Hindu mother goddess Lalita. The names are organized in a hymn (stotras). It is the only sahasranama that does not repeat a single name. Further, in order to maintain the meter, other sahasranamas use the artifice of adding suffixes like tu, api, ca, and hi, which are conjunctions that do not necessarily add to the meaning of the name except in cases of interpretation. The Lalita sahasranama does not use any such auxiliary conjunctions and is unique in being an enumeration of holy names that meet the metrical, poetical and mystic requirements of a sahasranama by their order throughout the text.

Lalita Sahasranama begins by calling the goddess Shri Mata (the great mother), Shri Maharajni (the great queen) and Shrimat Simhasaneshwari (the queen sitting on the lion-throne). In verses 2 and 3 of the Sahasranama she is described as a Udyat-bhanu Sahasrabha (the one who is as bright as the rays of thousand rising suns), Chaturbahu Samanvita (the one who has four hands) and Ragasvarupa Pashadhya (the one who is holding the rope). Chidagnikunda Sambhuta (one who was born from the altar of the fire of consciousness) and Devakarya samudyata (one who manifested Herself for fulfilling the objects of the devas) are among other names mentioned in the sahasranama.

== Iconography ==
Her form is described in her Dhyana Stotra as follows.

'aruṇāṃ karuṇā taraṅgitākṣīṃ
dhṛtapāśāṅkuśa puṣpa bāṇa cāpām ।
aṇimādibhirāvṛtāṃ mayukhaiḥ
ahamityeva vibhāvaye bhavānīm'.

Translation:

I imagine of my goddess Bhavani, who has a color of the rising sun. Who has eyes which are waves of mercy, who holds Pasha, Ankusha, bow made of sugarcane, arrows made of soft flowers, in her hands and who is surrounded, by her devotees with powers great, as personification of the concept of “I”.

Also details of her appearance are found in the famous hymn in her praise, the Lalita Sahasranama, where she is said to be,

seated on a throne like a queen (names 2 and 3), to wear jewels (names 13 and 14), to have the auspicious marks of a married woman (names 16–25), and to have heavy breasts and a thin waist (name 36); the crescent moon adorns her forehead, and her smile overwhelms Kameshwara, the lord of desire (name 28). She has as her throne with its legs being Pancha Brahmas (five Brahmas) (name 249).

She is often depicted iconographically as a 16-year-old girl (hence the appellation "Shodashi") seated on a lotus that rests on the supine body of Sadashiva, which in turn lies on a throne whose legs are the gods Brahma, Vishnu, Isvara, and Rudra. In some cases, the lotus is growing out of Shiva's navel. In other more common cases, the lotus is grown directly from the Sri Chakra.

In the Jnana Khanda of Tripura Rahasya, goddess herself describes her eternal form.

In the island of jewels, encircled by the ocean of nectar, beyond the universe, there is a mansion made of Chintamani (wish giving jewel) in the grove Kadamba (Burflower) trees. There is a platform with four legs representing Brahma, Vishnu, Mahesha and Ishwara, and the platform itself represent the back Sadashiva. On it, is installed my non-transcendent form as Tripura Sundari in the form of eternal consciousness.

— Shri Tripura Rahasya (Jnana Khanda), Chapter 20, Verses 36:37

The Vamakeshvara Tantra says that Tripura Sundari dwells on the peaks of the Himalayas; is worshipped by sages and heavenly nymphs; has a body like pure crystal; wears a tiger skin, a snake as a garland around her neck, and her hair tied in a jata; holds a trident and drum; is decorated with jewels, flowers, and ashes; and has a large bull as a vehicle.

The Saundarya Lahari and the Tantrasara describe her in detail from her hair to her feet. The Tantrasara dhyana mantra says that she is illuminated by the jewels of the crowns of Brahma and Vishnu as two deities bowed down to worship her. Kinsley also says that "In the Saundarya Lahari and Tantrasara she is not associated with Shiva in any obvious way as she is in other depictions".

Vaishnavism traditions have a similar set of complementary parallels between Vishnu and Lakshmi. The Tantric Vaishnava Pancharatra texts associates Lalita with Lakshmi. Author Douglas Renfrew Brooks says, "Lalita, like the Pancharatra conception of Lakshmi, acts independently by taking over the cosmic functions of the male deity; yet she does not defy the god's wishes". Brooks also says, "In contrast to most Vaishnava conceptions of Lakshmi, however, Lalita destabilizes temporarily for the purpose of reasserting order".

Scholar and professor Thomas B. Coburn says,

Sri Vidya, then, can be understood as one of the premier instances of Hindu Shakta Tantrism. Specifically, it is the tradition (sampradaya) which deals with worship of Tripurasundari, "the most beautiful Tantric form of Sri/Lakshmi, [who is]... the most benign, beautiful and youthful yet motherly manifestation of the Supreme Shakti.

== Sri Yantra ==
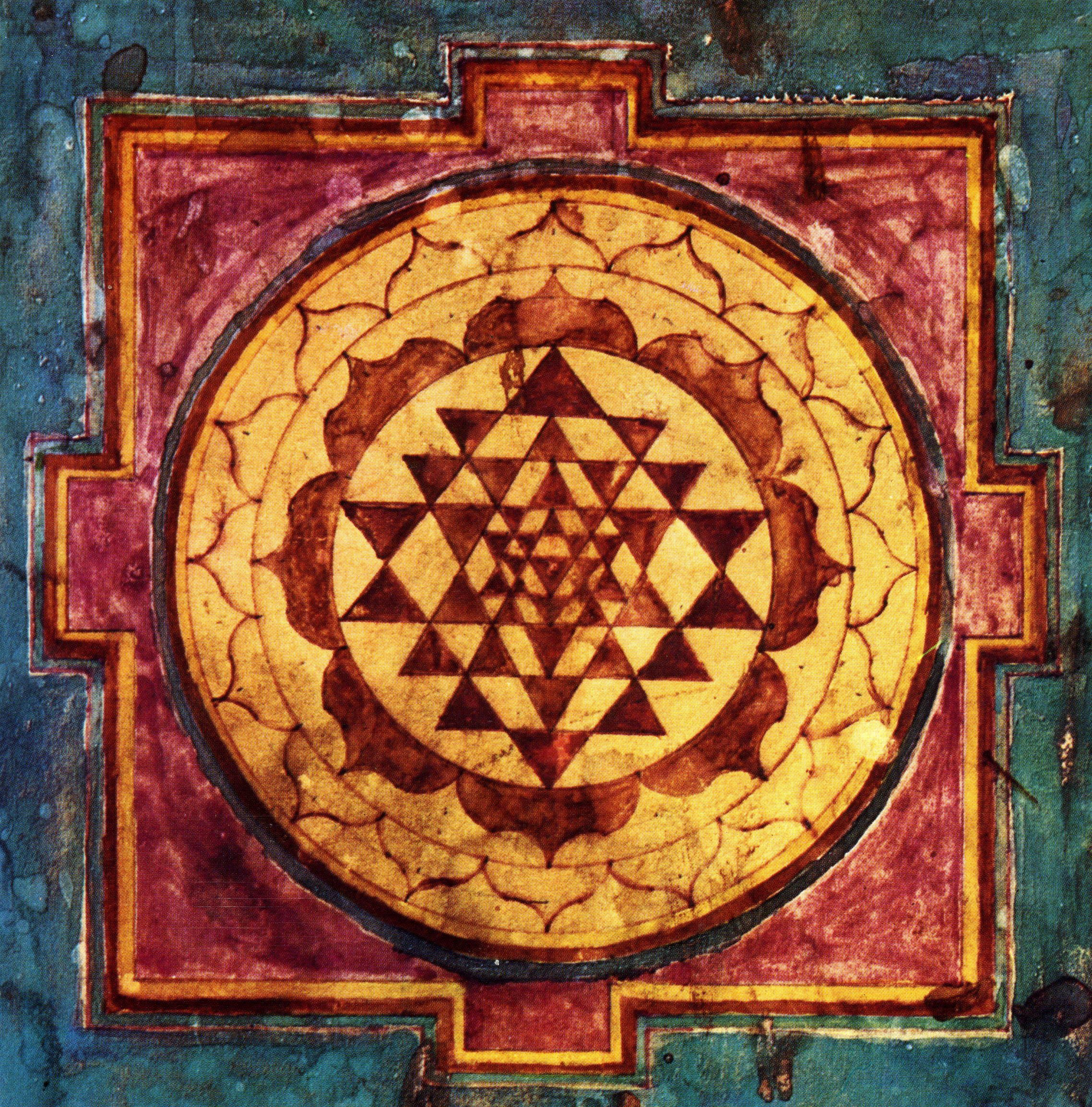
The Sri Yantra in diagrammatic form, showing how its nine interlocking triangles form a total of 43 smaller triangles

The Sri Yantra is a Geometrical form of (yantra) Divine Mother Lalitambika used in the Shri Vidya school of Hinduism. Comprising nine interlocking triangles, it embodies complex symbolism. Four upward triangles signify Shiva, while five downward triangles represent Shakti. This encompasses the cosmic and human realms and the central point is called the Bindu. This configuration is also termed as Navayoni Chakra.

In the Shri Vidya tradition, the Sri Yantra represents the core of devotion. Each triangle and level is associated with specific aspects of divinity, culminating in a structure known as the Nava Chakra. Its projection into three dimensions results in the Maha Meru, symbolizing the philosophy of Kashmir Shaivism. Subhash Kak has drawn parallels between the Sri Yantra and ancient Vedic texts, emphasizing its enduring significance across Hindu spiritual thought.

== Temples ==
=== India ===
Notable Indian temples to Tripura Sundari include:

- Tirumeeyachur Mehanadhar Temple: Tirumeeyachur Mehanadhar Temple is located at Thirumeeyachur in Tiruvarur district, Tamil Nadu, India. As per a belief, Tirumeeyachur Mehanadhar Temple is where Sri Lalita Sahasranama was composed and Hayagriva taught it to Agastya maharishi.
- Adyar Kamakshi Temple, Tamil Nadu: While the primary deity of this temple is the goddess Kamakshi, she is often associated with Tripura Sundari in the Shakta tradition. The temple is located in Chennai, Tamil Nadu.
- Kanchi Kamakoti Peetham, Tamil Nadu: also called the Sri Kanchi Matham or the Sri Kanchi Monastery, is a Hindu institution, located in Kanchipuram, Tamil Nadu. It is located near a temple dedicated to Kamakshi, and a shrine for Adi Shankara.

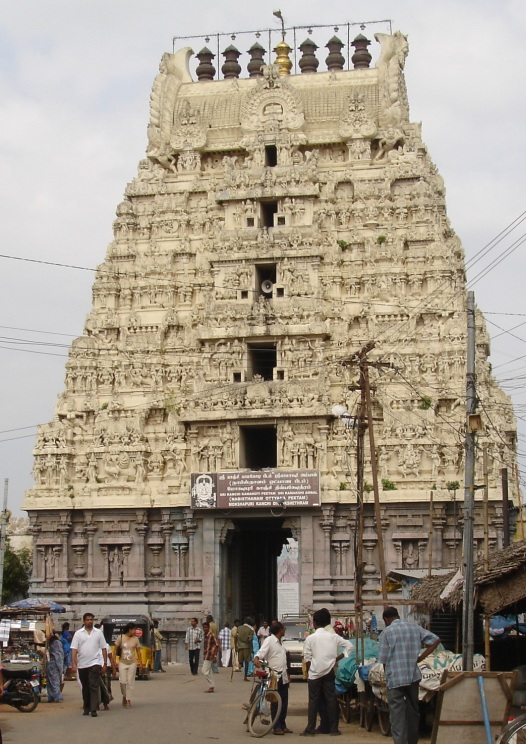
Kamakshi Amman Temple in Kanchipuram, Tamil Nadu, India (2005)

- Ratneshwari Temple, Jharkhand: this temple is dedicated to the goddess Tripura Sundari. It is believed to be one of the Shakti Peethas and has religious significance among devotees.
- Sri Rajarajeswari Temple, Karnataka: This peetham (spiritual institution) in Karnataka is dedicated to the goddess Rajarajeswari, a form of Tripura Sundari.

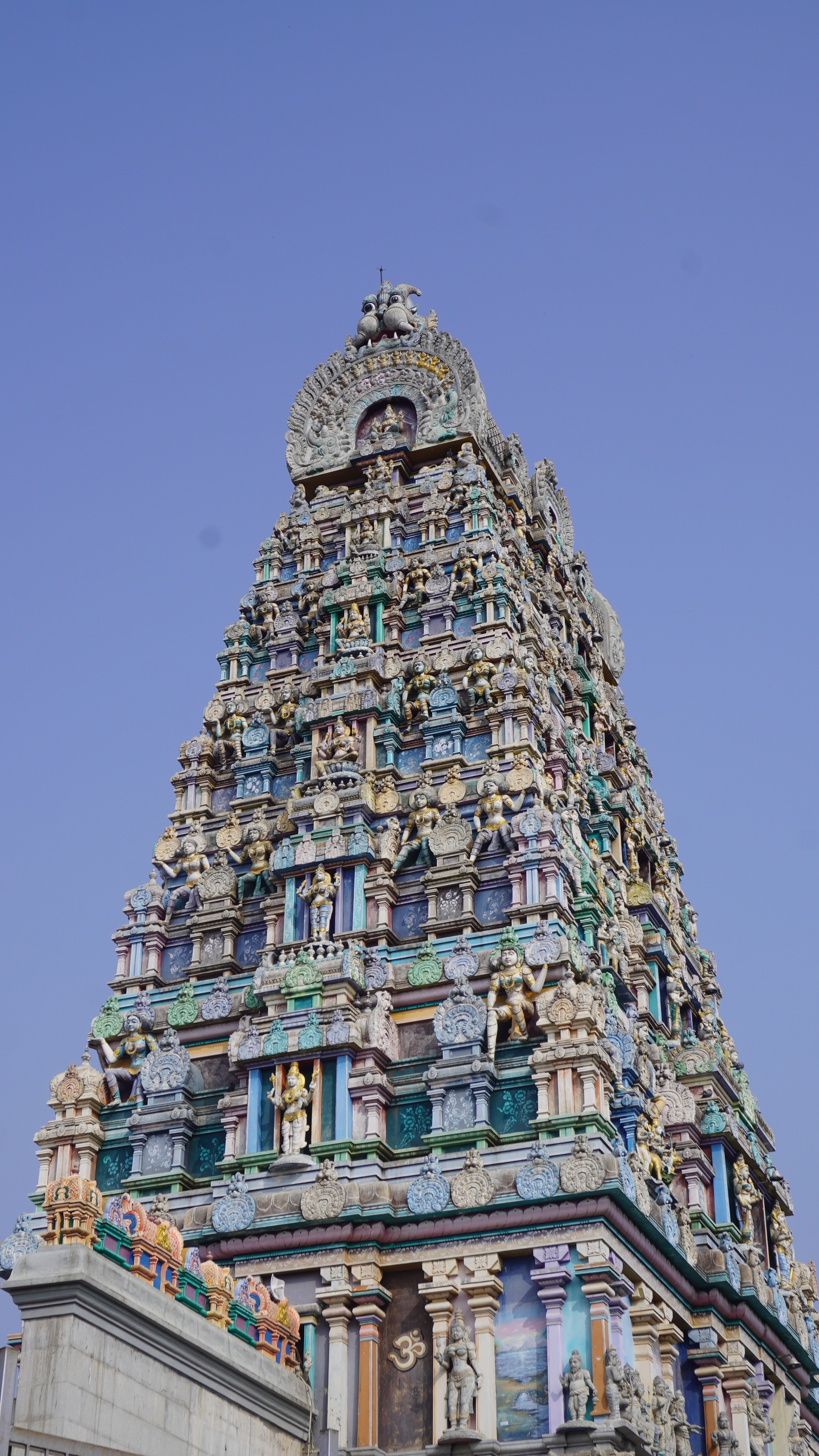
Sri Raja Rajeshwari Temple is located at Kenchenhalli, Raja Rajeshwari Nagar, Bangalore, Karnataka, India (2024)

- Tiruvakkarai Kamakshi Amman Temple, Tamil Nadu: This temple is located in Tiruvakkarai near Pondicherry, Tamil Nadu. It is an important pilgrimage site dedicated to the goddess Tripura Sundari. The temple is known for its intricate architecture and serene surroundings.
- Tripura Sundari Temple, Tripura: This temple is located in the ancient city of Udaipur in Tripura, India. It is one of the 51 Shakti Peethas, which are considered highly sacred in the Shakta tradition. The temple complex is dedicated to the goddess Tripura Sundari.

=== Germany ===
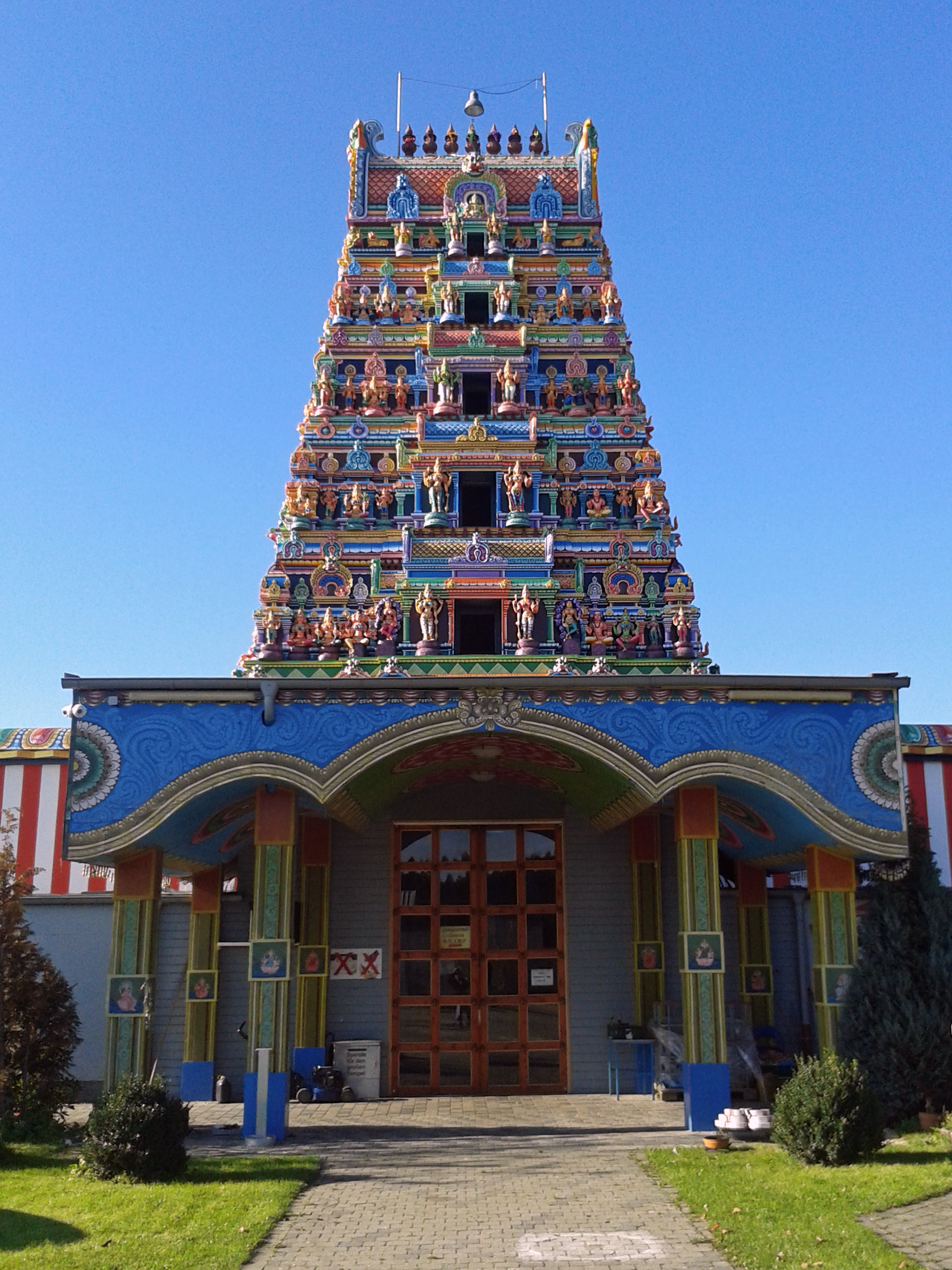
Sri Kamakshi Ambal Temple in Hamm, Germany (2014)

In Hamm in North Rhine-Westphalia, Germany, there is the Sri Kamadchi Ampal Temple, built in 2002.

== See also ==
- Kurukullā – Female deity in Tibetan Buddhism
- Triple Goddess – Three deities that are worshipped as one
