= Jagaddhatri =

Aspect of goddess Durga

Jagaddhatri / Jagadhatri / Mahadurga
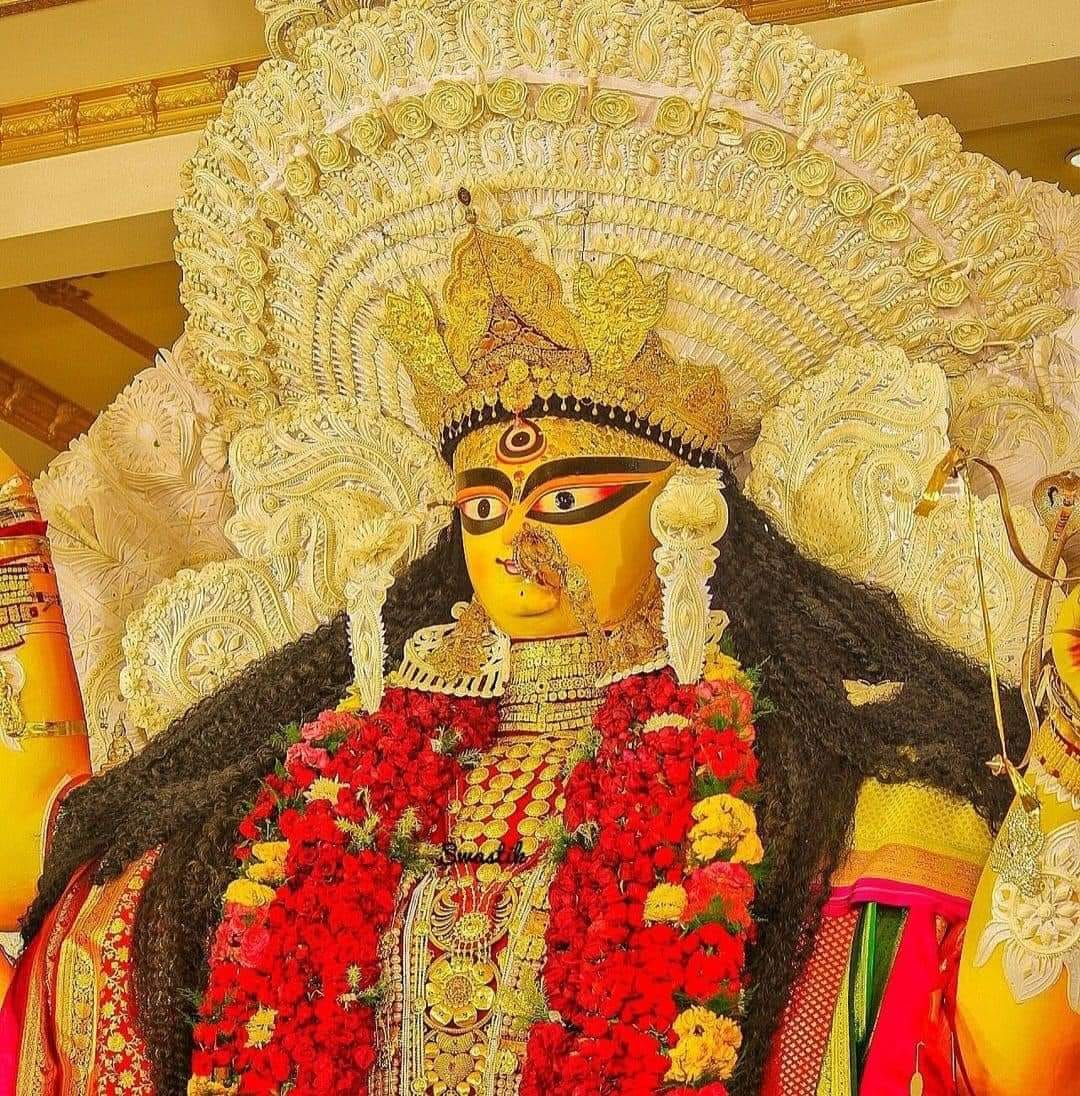
- The idol of Jagadhatri maa (Burima) in Chasapara barowari, Krishnanagar.
- Affiliation: Mahadevi, Parvati, Durga, Jagaddhatri, Mahadurga, Uma Haimavati
- Mantra: ॐ महादेव्यै बिद्महे, सिंहवाहिन्यै धीमहि, तन्नो देवी प्रचोदयात॥
- Weapon: Chakram, Bow, Arrow, conch
- Color: Red and green
- Mount: Lion
- Consort: Shiva

Jagatdhatri or Jagaddhatri or Mahadurga (Bengali pronunciation: [d͡ʒɔɡod̪ʱːat̪ɾi], lit. 'Bearer of the World') is an aspect of the Hindu goddess Durga, worshipped in the Indian state of West Bengal and other states like Odisha and Jharkhand. Maa Jagadhatri, the Goddess who is revered as the protector of the world. In Bengal, her puja is celebrated as the comeback of Devi, specifically in Krishnanagar, Chandannagar, Santipur, Rishra, Midnapore, Singur and Guptipara.

== Legends ==
The legend of Jagaddhatri is inspired from a tale in the Kena Upanishad. In the Katyayani Tantra, the following legend is told. After the goddess Durga killed Mahishasura, the gods of Svarga forgot about her powers. So, in order to test them, Parvati appeared before the gods Agni, Vayu, Varuna, and Chandra, who considered themselves invincible and were engulfed by ahamkara (ego). She asked them to move a tiny blade of grass. Vayu failed to pluck it; Agni failed to burn it. Every god failed at the task. In the end, they understood that the Goddess is the source of all power in the universe; even theirs. The goddess appeared before them as Uma, riding on a lion. The goddess is equated with Brahman in the narrative. The goddess gave the ego of the gods the form of an elephant. Jagaddhatri is depicted sitting on a lion with an elephant under them. The elephant, symbolizing ahamkara, lies under the paws of her vahana the lion, who symbolises courage, valour and the strength to overcome any challenges, including one's internal struggles with the Shada Ripus ("the six enemies"). She is named as Mahadurga in Shiva Purana. While in some other texts, as Uma Haimavati.

Her dhyana mantra describes her weapons, vahana and her iconography. She is sitting atop a lion, wearing different jewelry, in her four hands Devi holds bow, arrow, chakra and Samkha. She is reddish like the rising sun and she is wearing a snake garland. Her reddish colour and weapons are the symbols of raja guna but this is not for destruction and going to war. Rather this is to keep the world focused on Ritam & Satyam.

In her stotram (Jagadhatri Strotram), she has been invoked as Adhara bhutah, Dhritirupah, Dhurandharah, Dhruvapadah, Shaktistah, Shaktirupah, Shaktacharpriyah, Shaktivigrahe. "You must believe in the Ishwara rupa. Do you know the meaning of Jagadhatri rupa? She is carrying the world. If she stops then the world will get destroyed" is said by Sri Ramakrishna.

She sustains the universe through her Yoga shakti. Naga/Sarpa is the symbol of Yoga & Upavitam is the symbol of Bramhin. Devi is yogini. She is using the world through her maha yoga shakti. The act of rescuing the world is her lila.

It is said that she had killed the elephant demon, Karindrasura. Its mention is not found in her dhyana mantra but in her idol an elephant is seen below her mount lion, who is none other than Karindrasura. It's said that once the Airavata of Indra was cursed and therefore it took birth as Karindrasura. He became a very strong demon. Once, he saw goddess Ganga and was attracted to her beauty. Hence, he lusted for her, but Ganga rejected his proposal. Karindrasur became very furious about the rejection and forced Ganga to come with her. To save her life she prayed to goddess Mahamaya and she appeared in the form of Jagatdhatri. A vicious battle took place between the goddess and the demon, where Goddess Jagatdhatri slayed Karindrasura with the help of her chakra, Bow and arrow. From then she was known as Karindrasurnishudini. After that Airavat was free from the curse.

Another encounter mentions that Karindrasura became an important and powerful official of Durgamasura whom Goddess Durga killed by taking form of Jagaddhatri during the battle of Durga and Durgamasura.

Another story tells that when Mahishasura took form of an elephant during the battle with Goddess Katyayini, he came to be known as Karindrasura, who was slayed by Goddess in form of Jagddhatri with Chakra, bow and arrow. In this encounter Mahishasura and Karindrasura are indifferent, just with different animal forms.

== Difference between Durga and Mahadurga (Jagaddhatri) ==
Though form of the same goddess, both Durga and Mahadurga (Jagaddhatri) have difference. Durga is said to have killed demons: Durgamasura and Mahishasura. While Mahadurga or Jagaddhatri is said to have destroyed the pride of the gods or Devas and killed the demon Karindrasura. In Katyayini Tantra Jagaddhatri is named as Mahadurga. Hence, Mahadurga is another name of Jagaddhatri. She is different from MahishasurMardini Durga or Durgamdalani ShriDurga.

Another difference between both is that Mahadurga represents Sattvasguna, while Durga represents Rajaguna.

== History of worship ==
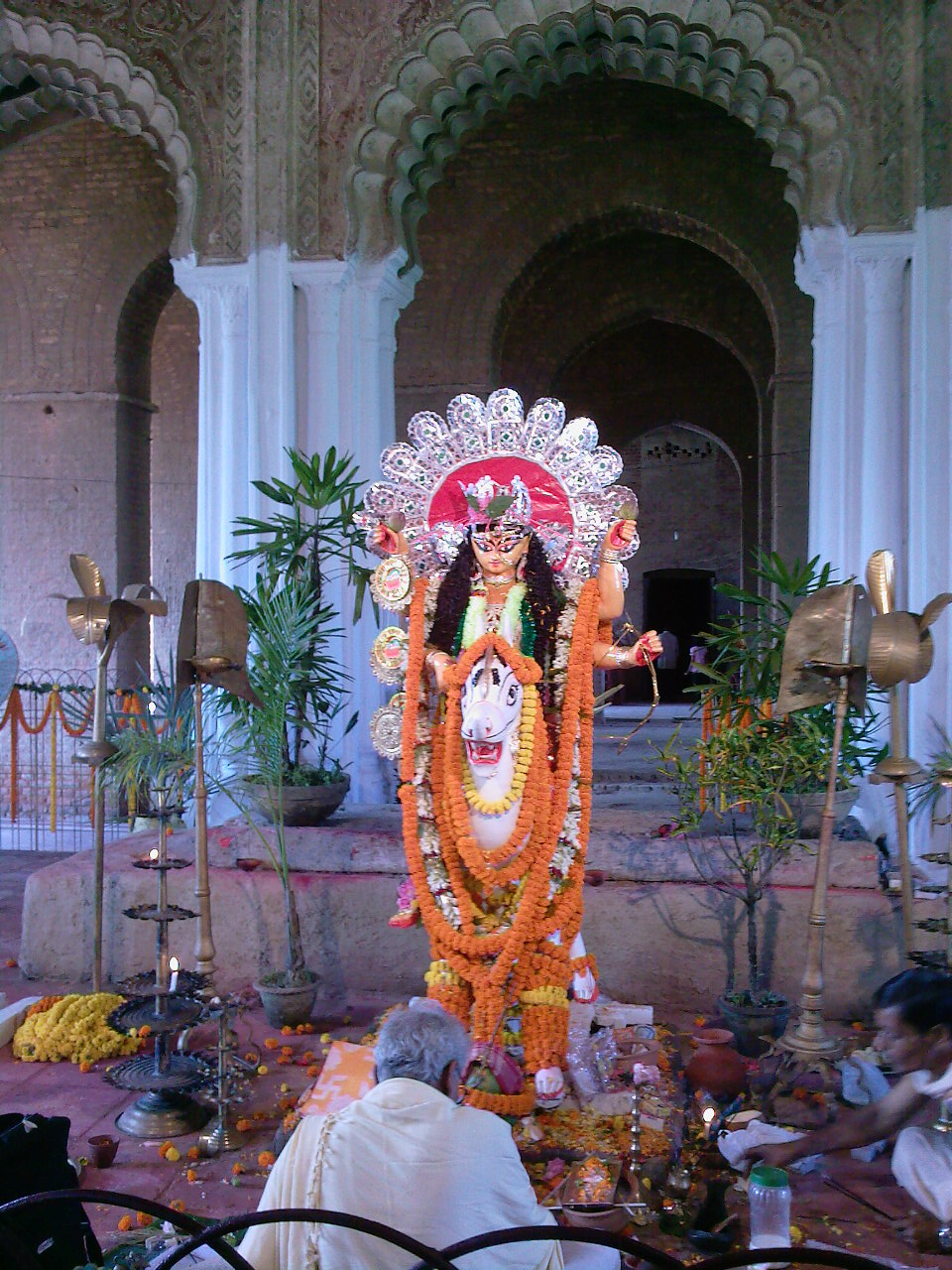
Jagatdhatri Puja at Krishnanagar Royal Palace

Popular narrative states that the worship of Jagaddhatri in Bengal was begun by Maharaja Krishnachandra of Krishnanagar, Nadia. However, as per local history, the worship of goddess Jagatdhatri was first established by Chandrachur Tarkamani of Santipur who made an idol of the goddess at the behest of Raja Girishchandra. At the time only ghat puja was conducted at Krishnanagar, Nadia in Bengal. Idol worship of the goddess was initiated in the village of Bramhasason, which is located in Haripur in Santipur, Nadia. Furthermore, the Jaleshwara temple of Shantipur (1665) and Raghaveshwara Temple (1669) have the idol of the goddess inside the sanctum sanctorum as well as carved on the temple walls. So, her worship may have been known in Nadia long before Krishna Chandra.

At Krishnanagar, Raj Rajeshwary Jagatdhatri Puja is one of the oldest in Bengal. According to local history, Maharaja Krishnachandra was imprisoned by Nawab Alivardi Khan and, after his release on Vijaya Dashami, received a vision of Goddess Jagaddhatri, inspiring him to begin her worship in his kingdom. The puja was performed by Raj Rajeshwary (Raj Mata in Bengali language), and another account mentions a Jagatdhatri Puja Maharaja established by Krishna Chandra named Maa Jaleshwari at "Malopara Barowary". The worship of the goddess was later resumed by Sarada Devi, wife of Ramakrishna.

The Jagatdhatri puja of Bose family and Chatterjee family of Palpara and Bhavanipur started in 1788 and continued by Chatterjees with all grandeur and tradition dating back centuries. The goddess is worshipped during the Shukla Paksha of the pious month of Kartika, especially the Tithi of Navami.

The oldest temple of the goddess is Mahavidya temple at Somra (Hooghly), established in 1621 CE.

== In literature ==
Goddess Jagatdhatri has been mentioned in many novels by Bengali authors, poets and novelists. Goddess Jagatdhatri figures in the historical fiction Anandamath written by Bengali novelist Bankim Chandra Chatterjee. It is the same literary work from which the national song of India Vande Mataram originates. In the novel, Kali, Durga, and Jagatdhatri are depicted as three aspects of 'Bharat Mata' (Mother India) – Jagatdhatri as the mother used to be, Kali as the mother now is, and Durga as the mother will be in future. The trio of goddesses are shown as the object of worship of a group of ascetics who form the protagonists of the story.
