= Devi Gita =

Holy scripture for Hinduism

Information
- Religion: Hinduism
- Author: Traditionally attributed to Vyasa
- Language: Sanskrit
- Chapters: 10
- Verses: 507

The Devi Gita (Sanskrit: देवीगीता, romanized: Devīgītā, lit. 'The Song by Goddess') is a Hindu philosophical text from the Devi-Bhagavata Purana, a major text of the Shakta sect devotees, in the form of dialogue between Mahadevi and king Himavan. It is also one of the sixty-four Gitas commonly referred to in Hindu scriptures

== Nomenclature ==
Gita means "song", Devi is the sanskrit word for "Goddess"; the masculine form is deva. Accordingly, Devi Gita literally means "the song of the Goddess."'

== Date ==
C Mackenzie Brown states that given the specific philosophical ideas and literary works with which the Devi Gita is familiar, "it is difficult to place the text earlier than the thirteenth century of the Common Era, and it may be as late as the sixteenth century."

== Structure ==
The Devi Gita is a text that consists of the last ten chapters of the seventh Canto of the Devi Bhagavata Purana. It has 507 verses and often circulates as its own text. It presents a magnificent vision of a universe created, pervaded and protected by an all-powerful, all-knowing and all-compassionate Divine Feminine.

== Content ==
The Devi Gita frequently explains Shakta ideas by quoting from the Bhagavad Gita.

=== Narrative ===
The Devi Gita focuses on the Goddess’s answers to Himalaya’s queries. Tarakasura, the king of demons, conquered the three worlds after receiving a boon from Lord Brahma. While the gods, who have lost their divine kingdoms to the demon Taraka, take refuge in the goddess to regain their worldly fortunes, Himalaya, the epitome of supreme devotion, seeks spiritual realization for himself. He inquires of the Goddess about her true nature and relation to the material world as well as the means of union with the Supreme Goddess, the ultimate goal of human existence. As the Universal Mother is anxious to satisfy the desires of all her children, she fulfills the desires of the King Himalaya. She first appears to the gods and the Himalayas in a blinding light representing the Absolute or Brahman, whose nature is infinite existence, pure consciousness and eternal bliss. Then, the Goddess quickly emerges from the orb of light in her non-transcendental form as Bhuvaneshwari, the beautiful and gracious, four-armed, Mother of the Universe. Later in the Devi Gita, while describing her essential oneness with the universe, the goddess manifests her most terrifying, masculine form, Virat.

=== Chapters ===
==== Chapter 1:The Appearance of the Great Goddess before the Mountain King Himalaya and the Gods ====
The first chapter of the Devi Gita provides the mythological background for the spiritual instructions of the devotees of the Great Goddess. The Devi Gita begins with Vyasa's disciple King Janamejaya questioning the manifestation of this supreme energy. Oppressed deities She is praised in hymns. This is the first of two important hymns in the Devi Gita that depict the Goddess as one power. Behind all the goddesses, the energy of all, and identifies her with Brahman. The first part of the hymn is based on the "Devi Stuti" contained in the Devi Upanishad. After the hymn, the gods called for help against the Taraka. In view of the exemplary and steadfast devotion of the king Himalaya, the Devi Bhuvaneshwari assures them of help by promising to send the energy known as Gauri as a special act of grace to the king Himalaya. Unlike the gods, Himalaya is primarily motivated by a desire for spiritual realization, and so he makes a special request of his own. He prays to the Devi to explain the true nature of the Goddess and to explain the various paths of yoga discipline, devotion and knowledge.

==== Chapter 2: The Devi as the Supreme Cause of Creation ====
Second chapter briefly outlines the first cosmological process using two overlapping models of creation, one an evolutionary unfolding of primordial elements based on the classical Samkhya school, and the other a reflective model emphasizing the transcendence and immutability of supreme reality, a model particularly favored by Advaita. According to the evolutionary model presented in the text, as Mackenzie Brown points out, the Goddess brings forth from within herself the creative, projective power known as Maya, the efficient and material cause of the universe.

I am the Lord and the Cosmic Soul;
I am myself the Cosmic Body (Virat).
I am Brahma, Vishnu, and Rudra,
as well as Gauri, Brahmi, and Vaishnavi.

— Devi Gita 03.13

==== Chapter 3: The Devi Reveals Her Cosmic Body (Virat Rupa) ====
Chapter 3 describes how the Goddess enters into her creation and thereby becomes unattached to samsara. At the same time, she expresses her identity with all cosmic and mundane manifestations in a grand cosmic vision of the universe.

==== Chapter 4: Instruction in the Yoga of Knowledge ====
In chapter 4, the Devi continues her discussion interrupted by her cosmic manifestation as the Virat of the genesis of individual souls through the power of ignorance and its karmic entanglements.

== Philosophy ==
The Goddess is described by the text as a "universal, cosmic energy" resident within each individual, weaving in the terminology of Samkhya school of Hindu philosophy. It is full of Advaita Vedanta ideas, emphasizing its ambiguity, misrepresenting all dualities, and treating the interconnected oneness of the soul of all beings with Brahman as liberating knowledge. The Bhakti concept of the Devi Gita portion of this Purana is influenced by the Bhagavad Gita, and shares similarities with the Vaishnava concepts of devotion to Krishna found in the Bhagavata Purana. A special type of devotion called para bhakti is mentioned here as the highest way of realizing the supreme goddess.

== Translations ==
There are several separate translations of Devi Gita.

- Devi Gita - The Song of The Goddess translated by C. Mackenzie Brown
- Devi Gita translated by swami Satyananda Saraswati
- Sri Devi Gita translated by Ramamurthy Natarajan
- Sri Devi Gitai (Tamil Edition) by Ramamurthy Natarajan
- Le chant de la déesse: le Devi-Gita & autres textes de la tradition sakta by Pierre Bonnasse
- El Devî Gîtâ. L´ univers de la gran deessa by Samadhi Marga
- Деви гита. Песнь Великой Богини (Devi Gita: Song of the Great Goddess)

== See also ==
- Devi Mahatmya
- Devi-Bhagavata Purana
- Bhagavad Gita
- Ishvara Gita
- Uddhava Gita
- Vedas
- Prasthanatrayi
- Vyadha Gita
