= Shakambhari =

Hindu goddess

- Goddess of Nourishment
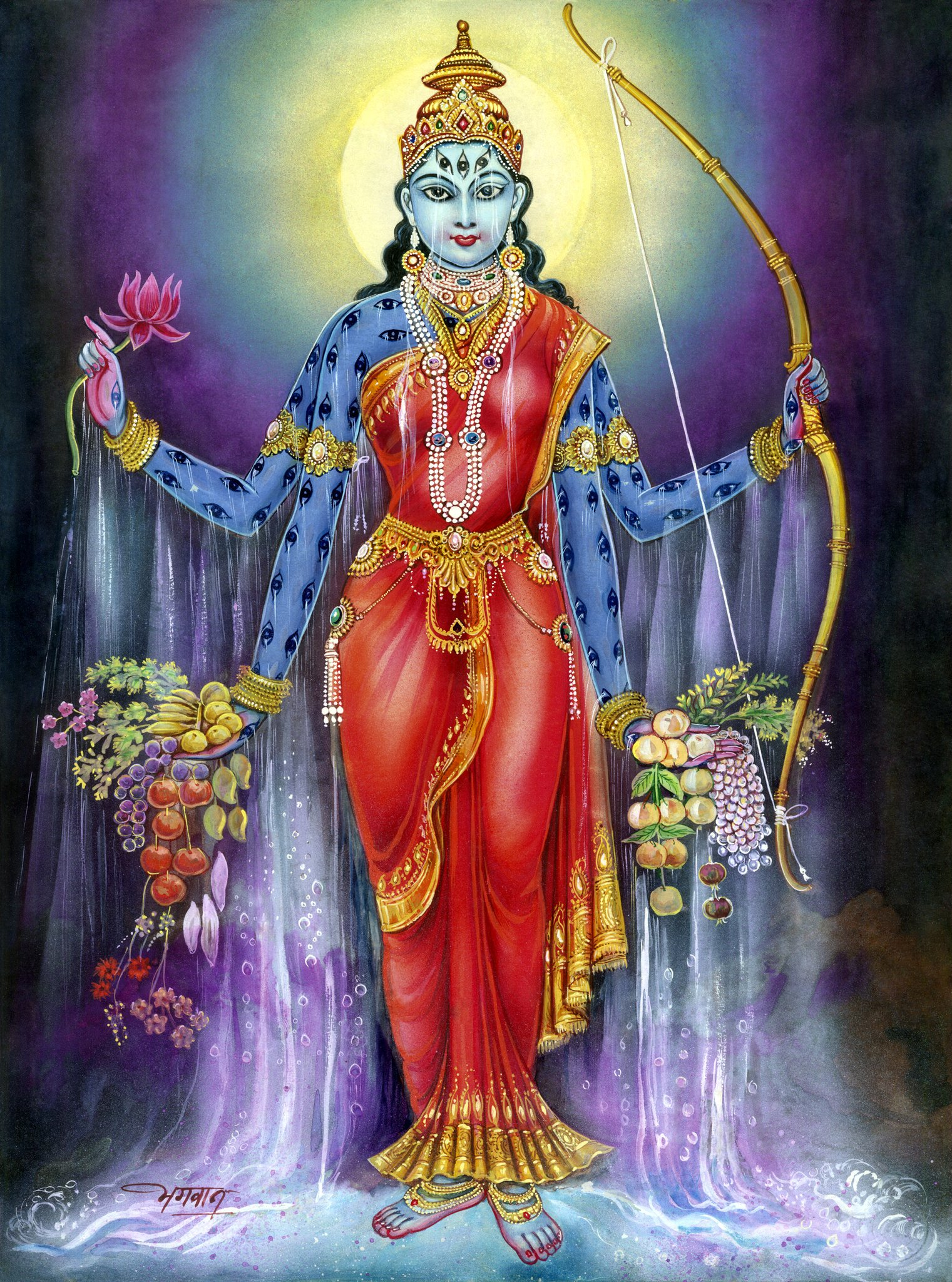
- Artistic depiction of Shakambhari
- Devanagari: शाकम्भरी
- Venerated in: Hinduism
- Affiliation: Mahadevi, Parvati
- Festivals: Navaratri, Durga Puja, Durga Ashtami

Shakambhari (Sanskrit: शाकम्भरी, IAST: Śākambharī), also referred to as Shatakshi, is the goddess of nourishment. She is regarded as a form of Mahadevi, and identified with Durga in Hinduism. After the malevolent asura Durgamasura deprived the earth of nourishment by causing the sages to forget the Vedas, the goddess appeared to offer human beings and devas sufficient fruits and vegetables to restore their strength.

== Etymology ==
The word śākaṃbharī means 'she who bears vegetables'. The word is derived from two words- śāka (Sanskrit: शाक) which means 'vegetable/vegan food' and bharī (Sanskrit: भरी) which means 'holder/bearer/wearer' which is ultimately derived from the root word bhṛ (Sanskrit: भृ) which means 'to bear/to wear/to nourish'.

== Legend ==
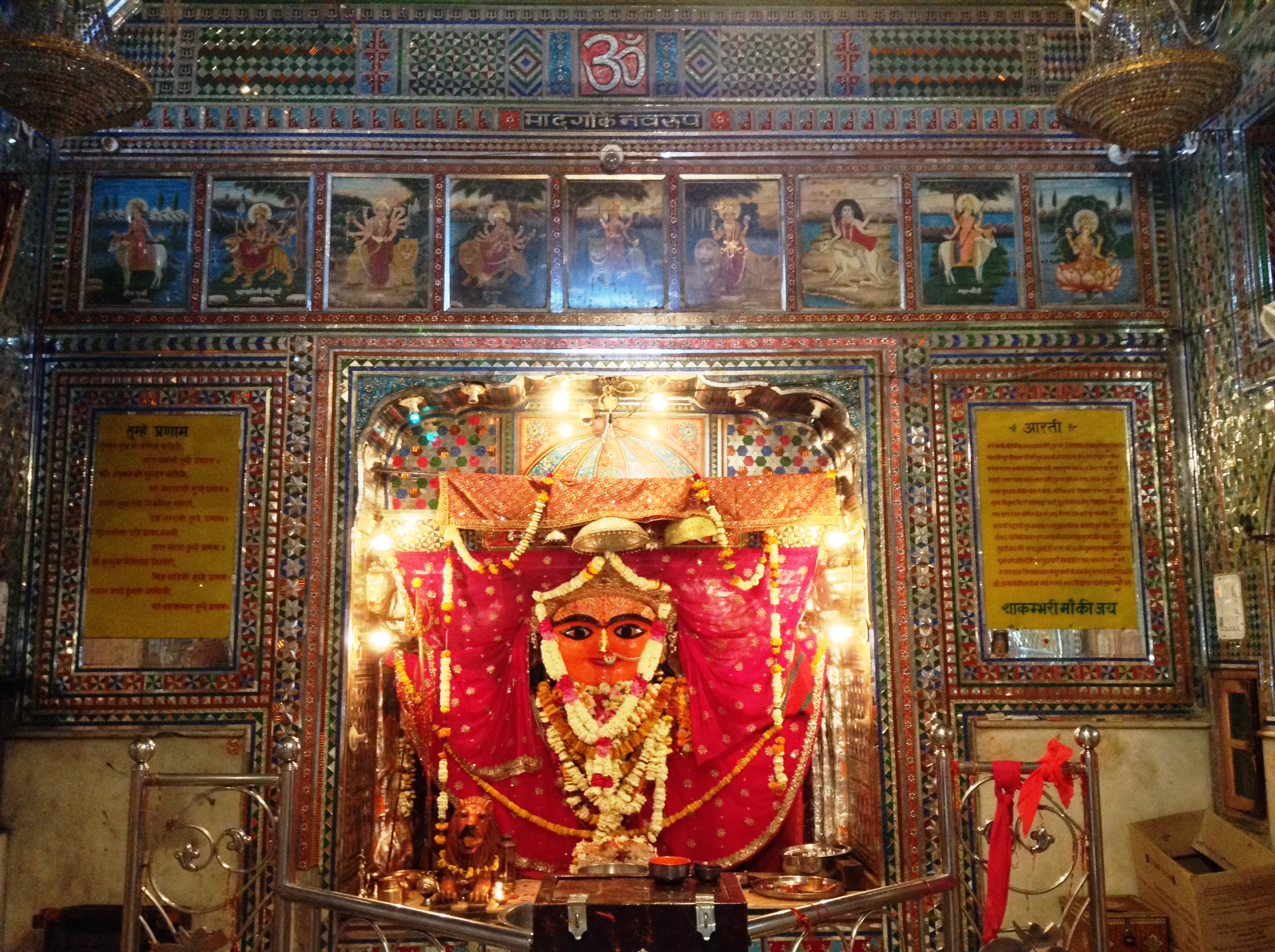
Shakambhari Mata Temple in Sambhar, Rajasthan

After the asura Durgamasura sought to plunge the earth in drought and scarcity, a century of suffering endured on earth, when the sages finally remembered the goddess Parvati after the asura had made them forget about the Vedas, she appeared upon the worlds in a dark-hued blue form, casting her hundred eyes on the sages. When the sages extolled and chanted the hymns of Ishvari, the four-handed goddess appeared bearing a lotus, arrows, a great bow, and vegetables, fruits, flower, and roots. According to the Devi Bhagavata Purana, seeing the misery of the people, she showered incessant tears from her eyes, streaming into rivers, and offering medicines.

The Uma Samhita of Shiva Purana identifies Devi Satakshi and Shakambari as manifestations of Goddess Parvati. A parallel account is also found in the Skanda Purana and Devi Bhagvatam, where Parvati is said to have slain the demon Durgamasura.

== Temple ==
There are several temples dedicated to Shakambhari. One temple is located in Saharanpur, Uttar Pradesh. Another major temple is in Rajasthan near Sambhar Lake, and a third is located in located in Badami.
