= Dyuloka =

Sanskrit term

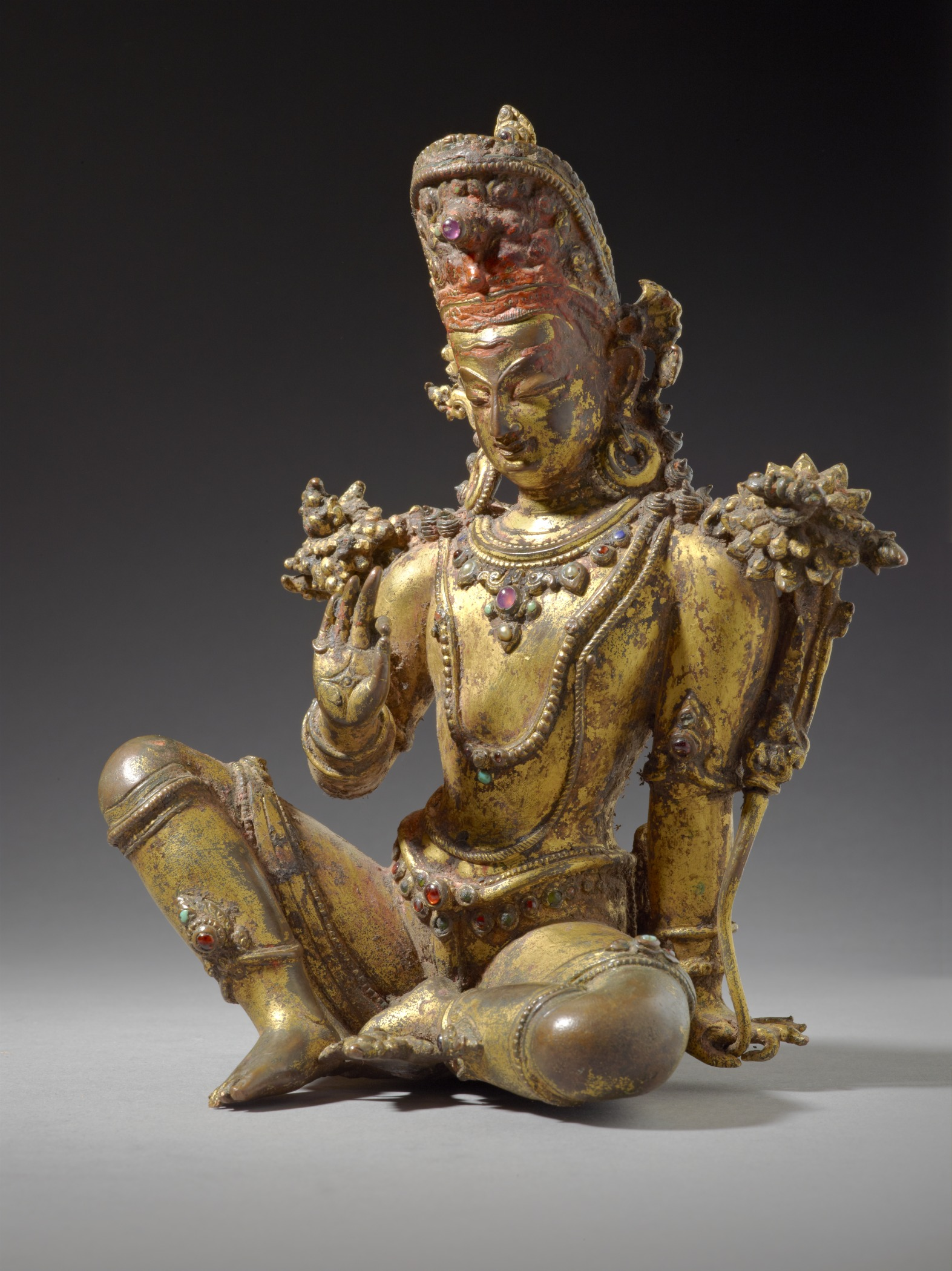
Indra, the king of Devas, who are supernatural beings residing in Dyuloka

Dyuloka is a Sanskrit term for "heavenly world". It appears in the Vedic text Shatapatha Brahmana, in verses 16.6.1.8–9 as well later texts. Its root is Dyu (द्यु) which in the Rigveda means "heaven, shining, sky".

The term appears in the Upanishads, where it connotes "sky or heaven", as in sun lighting it up. For example, in the commentary to the Yajnavalkya-Gargi dialogue of section 6.2 in the Brihadaranyaka Upanishad, Radhakrishnan translates Dyuloka as heaven.

In another context, Dyuloka is the realm of existence (samsara) where souls are reborn as gods and goddesses, to live out a life based on one's karma before they die again, according to the Devi-Bhagavata Purana.

== See also ==
- Vaikuntha
- Deva (Hinduism)
