= Mainaka =

Mountain deity in Hindu texts

- Abode: Himalayas
- Texts: Ramayana

Genealogy
- Parents: Himavan (father); Mena (mother)
- Siblings: Parvati, Ganga

Mainaka (Sanskrit: मैनाक, IAST: Maināka) or Mainaka Parvata, is a mountain deity from the Hindu epic Ramayana, the son of Himavan and Mena. He is the brother of the goddess Parvati. Mainaka is an ally of Hanuman, having helped the deity on his journey to Lanka.

== Legend ==
According to the Brahmanda Purana, in the ages of yore, the mountains had wings, and used to ascend and descend towards the earth as they liked. Due to the fears of the populace, Indra made the mountains stand in a row, and cut off their wings. Once the mountains sat down permanently, the ground—which was still shaky and floating on the ocean—became fixed. During this time, the god of the wind, Vayu, took away his friend Mainaka and granted him safety in the ocean. Mainaka and the ocean became close allies. Hanuman, who was the son of Vayu, became the friend and saviour of Mainaka. Owing to this, Mainaka gave refuge for Hanuman on his way to Lanka.
