= Himavat =

Hindu personification of the Himalayas

- Himalayas
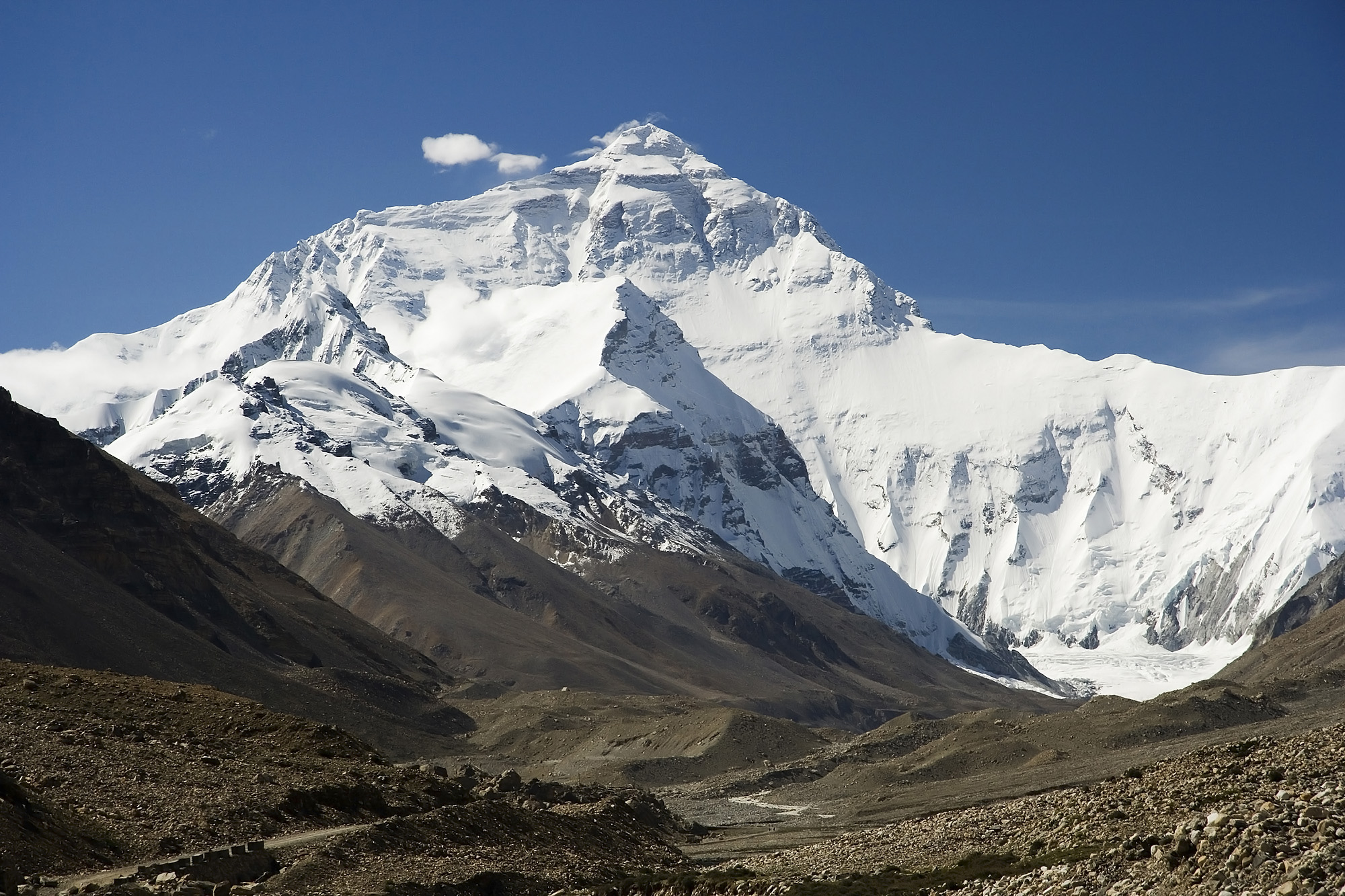
- The Himalayas mountains
- Devanagari: हिमवत्
- Affiliation: Himalayas
- Abode: Himalayas

Genealogy
- Parents: Brahma (father); Saraswati (mother)
- Siblings: Jambavan, Narada, others
- Consort: Menā
- Children: Ganga; Parvati; Mainaka; Krauñja

Himavat (Sanskrit: हिमवत्, lit. 'frosty') is the personification of the Himalayan mountains in Hinduism. He is the guardian deity of the Himalayas, and finds mention in the epic Mahabharata and other Hindu scriptures.

== Nomenclature ==
Various Hindu scriptures refer to the personification of the Himalayas by different names, and hence Himavat is also called Himavant (Sanskrit: हिमवन्त, lit. icy), Himavān (Sanskrit: हिमवान्, lit. snowy), Himaraja (Sanskrit: हिमराज, lit. king of snow), and Parvateshwara (Sanskrit: पर्वतेश्वर, lit. god of mountains).

== Legend ==
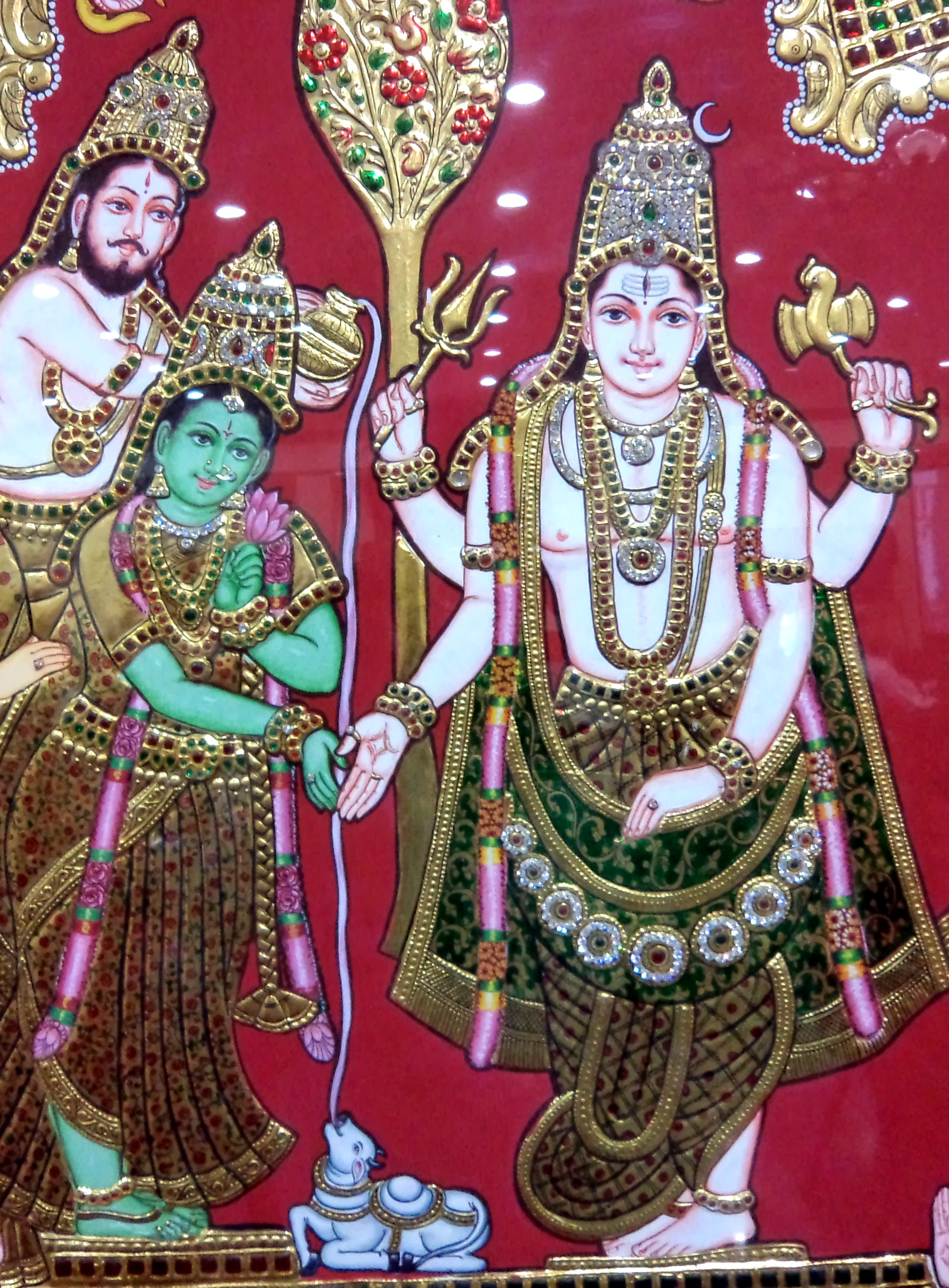
Himavat (left top) performing wedding rituals of his daughter Parvati with Shiva (right).

Himavat fathered Ganga, the river goddess, as well as Ragini, and Parvati, the second consort of Shiva. His wife and queen consort is the Vedic goddess Mainavati, the daughter of Mount Meru, according to the Ramayana, or is the daughter of Svadhā and her husband Kavi, a member of the class of Pitṛs, as per some other sources like the Vishnu Purana.

The Shiva Purana describes the wedding between Himavat and Menā.

The sacred text of Devi Gita, which is found in the last nine chapters (31-40) of the seventh skandha of Devi-Bhagavata Purana, is a dialogue between Parvati and her father Himavat. It deals with the universal form of the Devi, meditations on the major texts of Upanishads, ashtanga-yoga, the yogas of jnana, karma and bhakti, locations of the temples dedicated to the Devi and the rituals pertaining to her worship.

His story also finds mention in Brahmanda Purana and Kena Upanishad.

Krishna once performed a tapasya on the peaks of the Himalayas to appease Himavat, which led to his eldest son, Pradyumna, being born to his favourite wife, Rukmini.
