= Devi Bhagavata Purana =

Goddess-centric Hindu text

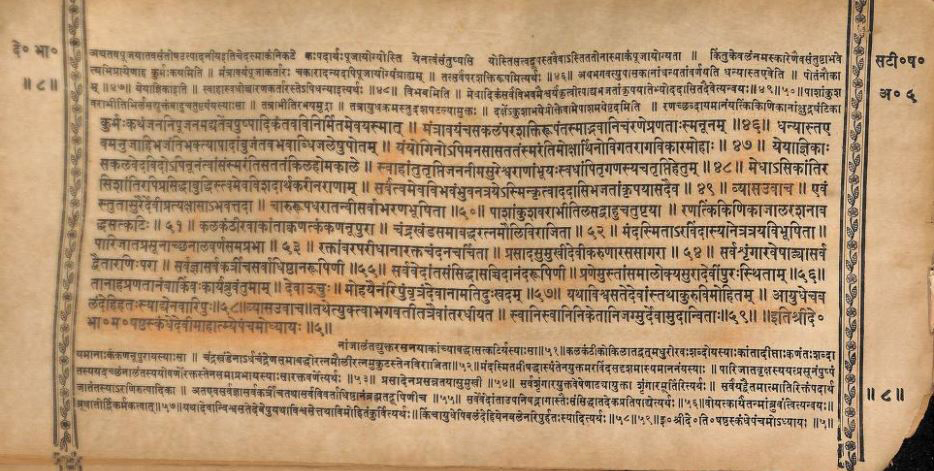
- A manuscript of Devi Bhagavata Purana

Information
- Religion: Hinduism
- Author: Vyasa
- Language: Sanskrit
- Period: 11th–12th century CE
- Chapters: 318
- Verses: 18, 000

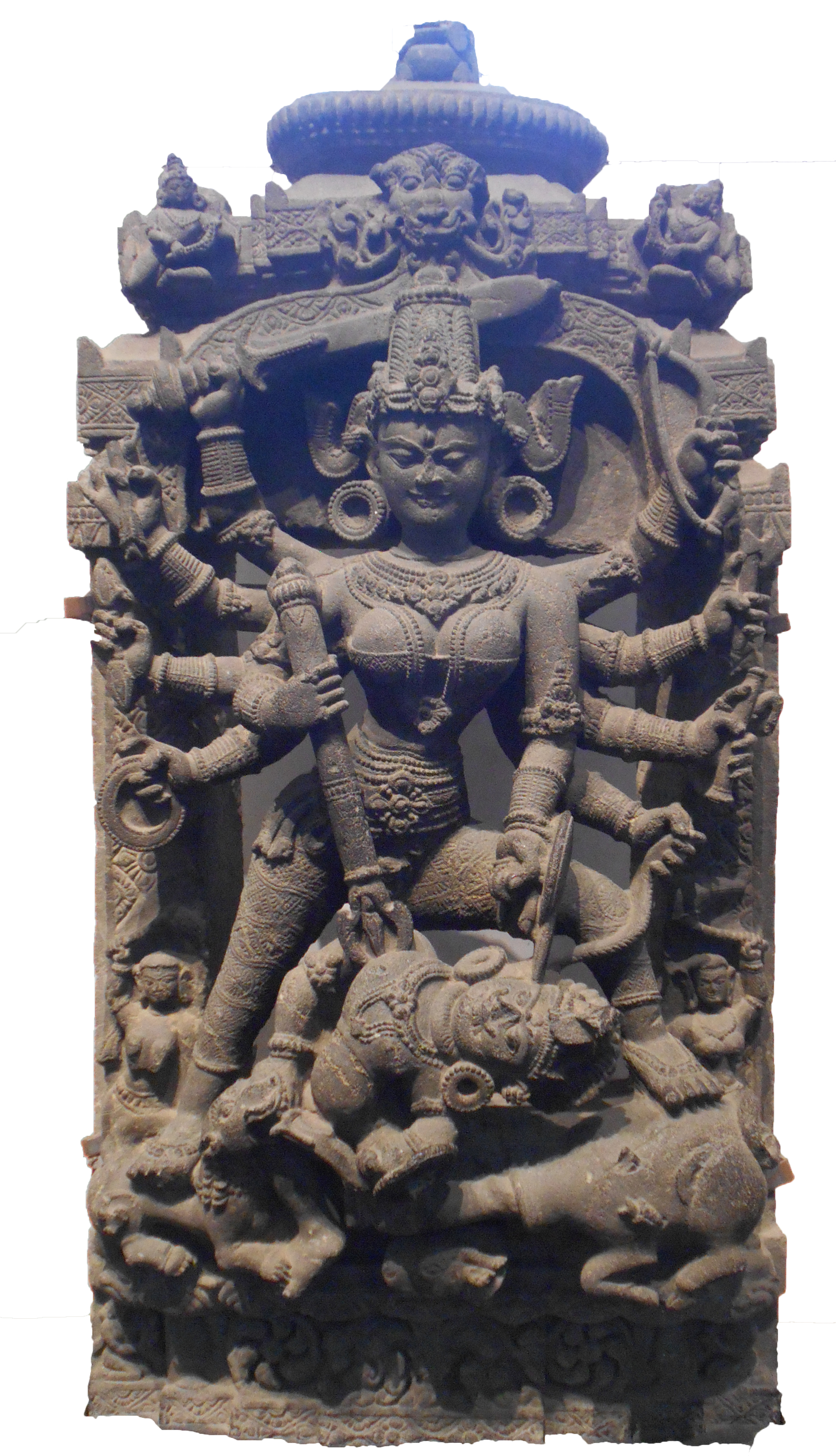
Stone sculpture of Devi Durga, Indian Museum, Kolkata

The Devi Bhagavata Purana (Sanskrit: देवी भागवतपुराणम्, devī bhāgavatapurāṇam), also known as the Devi Purana or simply Devi Bhagavatam, is one of the major Puranas of Hinduism. Composed in Sanskrit, the text is considered a Mahapurana for Devi worshippers (Shaktas), while others classify it as an Upapurana instead. It promotes bhakti (devotion) towards Mahadevi, integrating themes from the Shaktadvaitavada tradition (a syncretism of Samkhya and Advaita Vedanta). While this is generally regarded as a Shakta Purana, some scholars such as Dowson have also interpreted this Purana as a Shaiva Purana.

The Purana consists of twelve cantos with 318 chapters. Along with the Devi Mahatmya, it is one of the works in Shaktism, a tradition within Hinduism that reveres Devi or Shakti (Goddess) as the primordial creator of the universe, and as Brahman (ultimate truth and reality). It celebrates the divine feminine as the origin of all existence: as the creator, the preserver and the destroyer of everything, as well as the one who empowers spiritual liberation. While all major Puranas of Hinduism mention and revere the Goddess, this text centers around her as the primary divinity. The underlying philosophy of the text is Advaita Vedanta-style monism combined with the devotional worship of Shakti. It is believed that the text was spoken by Vyasa to King Janamejaya, the son of Parikshit.

== Nomenclature ==
The title of the text, 'Srimad Devi Bhagavata or 'Devi Purana'', is composed of two words, which together mean "devotees of the blessed Devi". Johnson states the meaning as the "ancient annals of the luminous goddess".

- Srimad (or Srimat, Sanskrit श्रीमत्) means 'radiant', 'holy', 'splendid', or 'glorious', and is an honorific religious title.
  - 'Sri'(or 'Shri' or 'Shree', Sanskrit श्री) means 'Prosperity'. Goddess Lakshmi and Tripura Sundari are referred to as 'Sri'.
- 'Devi' (Sanskrit: देवी) is the Sanskrit word for 'goddess'; the masculine form is deva. The terms Devi and Deva are Sanskrit terms found in Vedic literature of 2nd millennium BCE, wherein Devi is feminine and Deva is masculine. Monier Williams translates it as "heavenly, divine, terrestrial things of high excellence, exalted, shining ones".
- 'Bhagavata' (or Bhagavatam or Bhagavat, Sanskrit भागवत) means "devotees of the Blessed One", a general name for the earliest (before 11th century C.E.) devotees of Vishnu, particularly of Krishna-Gopala.
- 'Purana' (Sanskrit पराण) means 'ancient' or 'old' (or 'old traditional history'). It also means 'complete' and 'completing' in the sense that a Purana 'completes the Vedas'.
  - 'Maha' (Sanskrit महत) means 'great', 'large', or 'vast'.

== History ==
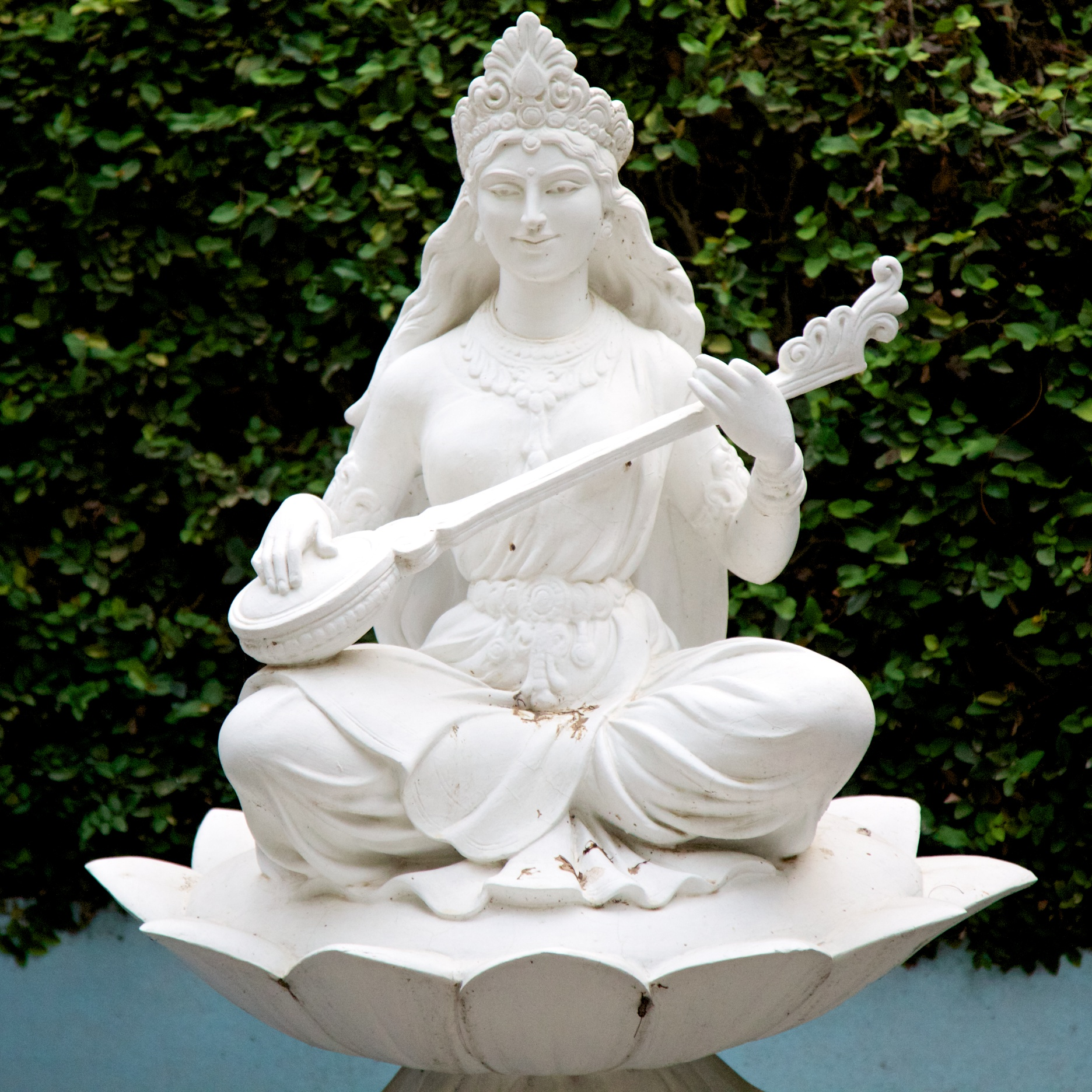
This Purana lists Saraswati (above) as the creative aspect of the supreme Goddess, the Shakti of Brahma.

The Srimad Devi Bhagavata Mahapurana has been variously dated. A few scholars suggest an early date, such as Ramachandran, who suggested that the text was composed before the 6th-century CE. However, this early date has not found wide support, and most scholars date it between the 9th and the 14th century. Rajendra Hazra suggests 11th or 12th century, while Lalye states that the text began taking form in the late centuries of the 1st millennium, was expanded over time, and its first complete version existed in the 11th century. Tracy Pintchman dates the text to between 1000 and 1200 CE.

The last ten chapters (31 to 40) of the seventh canto consist of 507 verses, a part which has often circulated as an independent volume, just like the Bhagavad Gita of the Mahabharata circulates independently. This text, from Book 7 of this Purana, is called Devi Gita. This text may have been composed with the original text, or it might be a later interpolation, according to C Mackenzie Brown. He suggests that this portion of the text was probably composed by the 13th century; it may be later, but was set down before the 16th century.

The ninth canto contains many verses that reference Mlecchas (barbarians) and Yavanas (foreigners). These words may just refer to hill tribes, but the details contained in the description of Mlecchas within these verses, according to some scholars like Hazra, suggest that the writer of these parts knew about Islam and its spread in India, leading scholars to date these parts of the ninth book to the 12th to 15th centuries, compared to the older core of the ninth book.

The Devi Bhagavata Purana is not the earliest Indian text that celebrates the divine feminine. The 6th century CE Devi Mahatmya, embedded in the Markandeya Purana, asserts the divine superiority of the Goddess. Archaeological evidence in Mathura and Bengal suggests that the concept of the divine feminine was in existence by about the 2nd century CE. Both the Devi Mahatmya and Devi Bhagavata Purana have been very influential texts within the Shakta tradition, asserting the supremacy of the female and have made the Goddess a figure of devotional (bhakti) appeal.

This text, along with all the Puranas, Vedas and the Mahabharata has traditionally been attributed by Hindus to the sage Veda Vyasa.

== Characters ==
=== Avatars of Devi ===
This table shows the notable incarnations of Devi mentioned in the Purana.

| Avatar (Incarnation) | Description | Canto |
|---|---|---|
| Bhuvaneshvari | Third Mahavidya form of Devi, queen of Manidvipa | 3 |
| Durga | Goddess of protection, strength, motherhood, destruction and wars | 5, 7, 9 |
| Parvati | Consort of Shiva, Goddess of love and fertility, who resides upon Kailasa. | -- 5,7,9 |
| Kali | Goddess of time and destruction | 5, 9 |
| Lakshmi | Consort of Vishnu, Goddess of wealth and purity | 1, 3, 9 |
| Saraswati | Consort of Brahma, Goddess of knowledge, music, art, speech, wisdom, and learning | 3, 5, 9 |
| Radha | Consort of Krishna, Goddess of love, compassion and devotion, Queen of Goloka | 9 |
| Savitri | Personified form of Gayatri Mantra and mother of Vedas | 9 |
| Shakambhari | The one who nourished mankind with fruits and vegetables. | 7 |
| Bhramari | The Goddess of bees | 10 |
| Tulasi | Personification of the Tulasi plant | 9 |
| Manasa | Goddess of Serpents | 9 |
| Mangala Chandika | A form of goddess Chandika | 9 |

=== Notable devotees ===
This table shows the devotees of the Goddess according to the Purana.

| Name | Description | Canto |
|---|---|---|
| Ila / Sadyumana | The king was named Sadyumana and later became the mother of the Budha | 1 |
| Anuha | The son of Vibhraja; He married the daughter of Shuka named Kirti. | 1 |
| Pratipa | Father of Shantanu and grandfather of Bhishma | 2 |
| Shringi | The young sage who cursed Parikshit | 2 |
| Kunti | Mother of Pandavas and wife of king Pandu | 2 |
| Suta | Son of Lomaharshana and a disciple of Vyasa | -- |
| Vasudeva | Father of Krishna, Balarama, and Subhadra; The king of the Vrishnis and a Yadava prince. | 2 |
| subahu | The king of Kashi | 3 |
| Sudarshana | The son of king Dhruvasandhi | 3 |
| Indra | The king of devas, God of weather | -- |
| Prahlada | Son of Hiranyakashipu | 4 |
| Nimi | The son of Ikshvaku | 6 |
| Sachi | Consort of Indra, Queen of devas | 6 |
| Himavan | Personification of the Himalayas, He is the guardian deity of the Himalayas, The Goddess preached the Devi Gita to him. | 7 |
| Sukanya | Daughter of King Sharyati | 7 |
| Satyavrata | A prince cursed by sage Vasishtha | 7 |
| Janamejaya | King of Kuru kingdom, Son of Parikshit, Vyasa preached the Devi Bhagavata Purana to him. | -- |
| Savarni | The eighth Manu of Hinduism | 10 |

=== Notable demons and villains ===
Many demons (villains) are mentioned throughout the Srimad Devi Bhagavatam

| Avatar (Incarnation) | Description | Canto |
|---|---|---|
| Madhu-Kaitabha | Two demons who originated from the earwax within the god Vishnu's ears. | 1 |
| Asura Hayagriva | Son of Kashyapa and Danu who Slain by Lord Hayagriva | 1 |
| Takshaka | One of the sons of Kadru, Murderer of Parikshit | 2 |
| Ravana | Multi-headed rakshasa king of the island of Lanka, | 3 |
| Mahishasura | The son of Mahisi (Buffalo) and the great-grandson of Brahmarshi Kashyapa, He was ultimately killed by goddess Durga | 5 |
| Tamra | One of minister's of Mahishasura | 5 |
| Durmukha | One of minister's of Mahishasura, killed by goddess Durga | 5 |
| Ciksura | General of Mahishasura, killed by goddess Durga | 5 |
| Shumbha and Nishumbha | Two Asura brothers, sons of Kashyapa and Danu, Goddess Kaushiki killed them both | 5 |
| Dhumralochana | The asura who was the general of the demon king Shumbha | 5 |
| Raktabija | One of minister's of the demon king Shumbha | 5 |
| Vritrasura | A great demon (asura) killed by Indra | 6 |
| Nahusha | A king of the Chandravamsha (Lunar dynasty), Nahusha was made the ruler of Svarga during Indra's absence | 6 |
| Hiranyaksha | He is slain by the Varaha (wild boar) avatar of Vishnu | 8 |
| Hiranyakashipu | Younger brother of Hiranyaksha, Slain by Narasimha | 5,10 |
| Durgamasura | A powerful demon who was killed by Goddess Durga | 9 |
| Shankachuda | Sudama who was lord Krishna's friend in his previous life | 9 |
| Arunasura | A powerful demon who was killed by the goddess Bhramari | 10 |

== Content and structure ==
The theosophy in the text, state Foulston and Abbott, is an encyclopedic mix of ancient history, metaphysics and bhakti. This history, states C Mackenzie Brown, is of the same type found in other Puranas, about the perpetual cycle of conflict between the good and the evil, the gods and the demons. These legends build upon and extend the ancient Hindu history, such as those found in the Mahabharata. However, this Purana's legends refocus the legends around the divine feminine, integrate a devotional theme to goddesses, and the Devi is asserted in this text to be the eternal truth, the eternal source of all of universe, the eternal end of everything, the nirguna (without form) and the saguna (with form), the supreme unchanging reality (Purusha), the phenomenal changing reality (Prakriti), as well as the soul within each living being.

=== Puranic characteristics ===
==== As a Mahapurana ====
There are two Bhagavatas in Hindu puranic literature, the Vishnu Bhagavata and Devi Bhagavata. There are some doubts between genuine of these two puranas, as an example in Uma Samhita of Shiva Purana Mentioned Srimad Devi Bhagavatam as fifth Mahapurana called Srimad Bhagavatam. Devi Bhagavata as it is called in itself, Bhagavata or Srimad Bhagavata confirms to the definitions of Bhagavata contained in other Puranas including Matsya Purana.

From J. L. Shastri's translation:

Where the stories of the goddess Durga are mentioned, it is said to be Bhagavata Purana as well as Devi Purana.

— Shiva Purana Uma Samhita, Chapter 44, verse 129

As mentioned in the Matsya Purana, the Bhagavata Purana is contain 18,000 slokas and begins with the Gayatri and glorifies the Sarasvata Kalpa. Vyasa mentions in Devi Bhagavatam that it was composed in Sarasvata Kalpa.

Farquhar mentions that devotees of Devi accept this Purana as the original Bhagavata Purana, the fifth among all the Puranas, and the Vishnu Bhagavata Purana is believed to have been composed by Vopadeva around A.D. 1300. He points out that Sridhara remarks on this claim in his (Vishnu) Bhagavata Purana commentary, a claim apparently common during his day, thus making it clear that Devi Bhagavata is posterior to the Bhagavata Purana and prior to Sridhara, who lived about A.D. 1400.

Winternitz mentions that there are three polemic treatises discussing whether Devi Bhagavata should instead be considered a Mahapurana.

Hazra mentions that there is a band of scholars, both European and Indian, who hold that the Devi Bhagavata is the real Bhagavata and that the Vaishnava Bhagavata is a spurious work, which he views their opinion as untenable and elaborates on eleven reasons why in his book.

Vishnulok Bihari Srivastava states that in Sanskrit literature, both Srimad Bhagavatam and Devi Bhagavatam are accepted as Mahapuranas, while the Vayu Purana, Matsya Purana and Aditya Upa Purana accept Devi Bhagavatam as a Mahapurana. Vanamali, in her book "Shakti", states that Devi Bhagavatam is classified as a Mahapurana. Puri states that in the Devi Bhagavata Purana it is entitled as the Bhagavata Mahapurana and the Vaishnava Bhagavata as an upapurana. Sanyal states that in the Saura Purana and the revakhanda of Skanda Purana, the Bhagavata Purana is mentioned as being divided into two parts. He further points out that the Vaishnava Bhagavata Purana is not so divided and that the Devi Bhagavata Purana is divided into two parts of six chapters each, so it may be the Devi Bhagavata Purana.

Wilson states that It is acceptable to include the Bhagavata among the eighteen Puranas, but it is said that it can only be the Devi Bhagavata as the circumstances apply more precisely than the Vaishnava Bhagavata.

==== Five characteristics ====
As a Sattvic Shakta Purana the Srimad Devi Bhagavatam has five characteristics.

From Swami Vijnanananda translation:

Thus, the Mahatma Veda Vyasa has divided this Bhagavata Purana into so many Skandhas and into so many chapters; and that the number of verses is eighteen thousand is already stated. That is denominated as Purana which contains the following five characteristics: (1) Sarga (creation of the universe), (2) Pratisarga (secondary creation), (3) Vamsa (dynasties), (4) Manvantaras, (5) Vamsa nuchararita (the description of Manus and other kings).

— Srimad Devi Bhagavatam First Canto, Chapter 2, Verse 17:18

=== Shlokas / Verses ===
Srimad Devi Bhagavatam consists of 12 cantos with 318 chapters. Although the number of original Sanskrit shlokas ('verses') is stated to be 18,000 by the Devi Bhagavata itself. The actual text, in different versions, is close.

Srimad Devi Bhagavatam Chapters and Verses
| | Swami Vijnanananda Translation | |
| Canto | Chapters | Verses |
|---|---|---|
| 1 | 20 | 1,185 |
| 2 | 12 | 723 |
| 3 | 30 | 1,746 |
| 4 | 25 | 1,426 |
| 5 | 35 | 2,086 |
| 6 | 31 | 1,885 |
| 7 | 40 | 2,251 |
| 8 | 24 | 793 |
| 9 | 50 | 3,563 |
| 10 | 13 | 508 |
| 11 | 24 | 1,239 |
| 12 | 14 | 964 |
| Total | 318 | 18,369 |
| Difference (Sanskrit) | | +369 |

== Cantos ==
For ease of reference, Swami Vijnanananda's complete 18-volume translation of the Srimad Devi Bhagavatam in wisdomlib is cited. It also provides original Sanskrit verses, transliterations, synonyms, and purports.

=== First Canto ===
Consisting of 20 chapters, the first book (skandha) like other major Puranas, states Rocher, presents the outline, the structure of contents, and describes how in the mythical Naimisha forest, the Devi-Bhagavata Purana was first recited among the sages. It also asserts that all of Reality was initially nirguna (without form, shape or attributes; in other words, there was nothingness except Truth). However, asserts the text, this nirguna Reality was a Bhagavati (woman), and she manifested herself as three Shaktis - Sattviki (truth, creative action), Rajasi (passion, aimless action) and Tamasi (delusion, destructive action). It also includes:

- The group of sages including Shaunaka requested Suta to recite the Bhagavata Purana, the fifth Purana among the Mahapuranas.
- Lord Vishnu assume the form of Hayagriva with the grace of Devi as a result of a curse by Vishnu's consort Lakshmi.
- The penance of Vyasa, and boon granted by Lord Shiva
- Birth of Budha from Tara by Soma; Sudyumna's change into a female named Ila and her prayers to the Goddess and the Goddess granting her a place at Her Lotus Feet
- Birth of Shukadeva and visit to Mithila to meet King Janaka
- Instructions of Bhagavati to Vishnu

In chapter fifteen chapter of the 1st canto, Devi reveals her true identity to Vishnu who is lying on a banyan leaf.

All this that is seen is I Myself; there is existent nothing other that is eternal

— Srimad Devi Bhagavatam, Canto 01, Chapter 15, Verse 52

=== Second Canto ===
Consisting of 12 chapters, this canto is short and historical. It weaves in the characters well known in the Hindu epic Mahabharata, states Rocher, and introduces in the key characters that appear in remaining books of the Devi-Bhagavata Purana. It also includes:

- Parasara union with Matsyagandha and part of Lord Vishnu, born as Vyasa.
- Union of Ganga with Shantanu and birth of eight Vasus as her sons.
- Birth of Dhritarashtra, Pandu and Vidura, Dhritarashtra marriage Gandhari and Saubali and Pandu's marriage with Kunti and Madri.
- The story of the birth Karna and five Pandavas.
- On the Kurukshetra War
- The story of Kasyapa and Takshaka meeting on the way to Parikshit's house and Takshaka entering a fruit and killing Parikshit.

=== Third Canto ===
Consisting of 30 chapters, this canto mentions the glory of Devi Bhuvaneshvari and her worship, at the beginning of the universe Brahma, Vishnu and Shiva see the Goddess reside in Manidvipa and praise her. It also weaves in legends from the Ramayana.

- Description about the secondary creation
- Trimurti going towards the heavens on the celestial car
- Devi transforms Brahma, Vishnu and Shiva into young girls, Trimurti eulogizes Devi with various hymns.
- Devi's description of her own self and the description of nirguna shakti and nirguna purusha.
- The Goddess bestows Saraswati on Brahma, Lakshmi on Vishnu and Gauri on Shiva.
- Fight between Yudhajit and Virasena
- Details about Navaratri festival and Rama's performing the Navaratri ceremony

=== Fourth Canto ===
Consisting of 25 chapters, this fourth canto presents more legends, including interactions between avatars of Hari, Krishna and Shiva and Kashyapa's birth as Vasudeva. It also introduces tantric themes and presents yoga meditation.

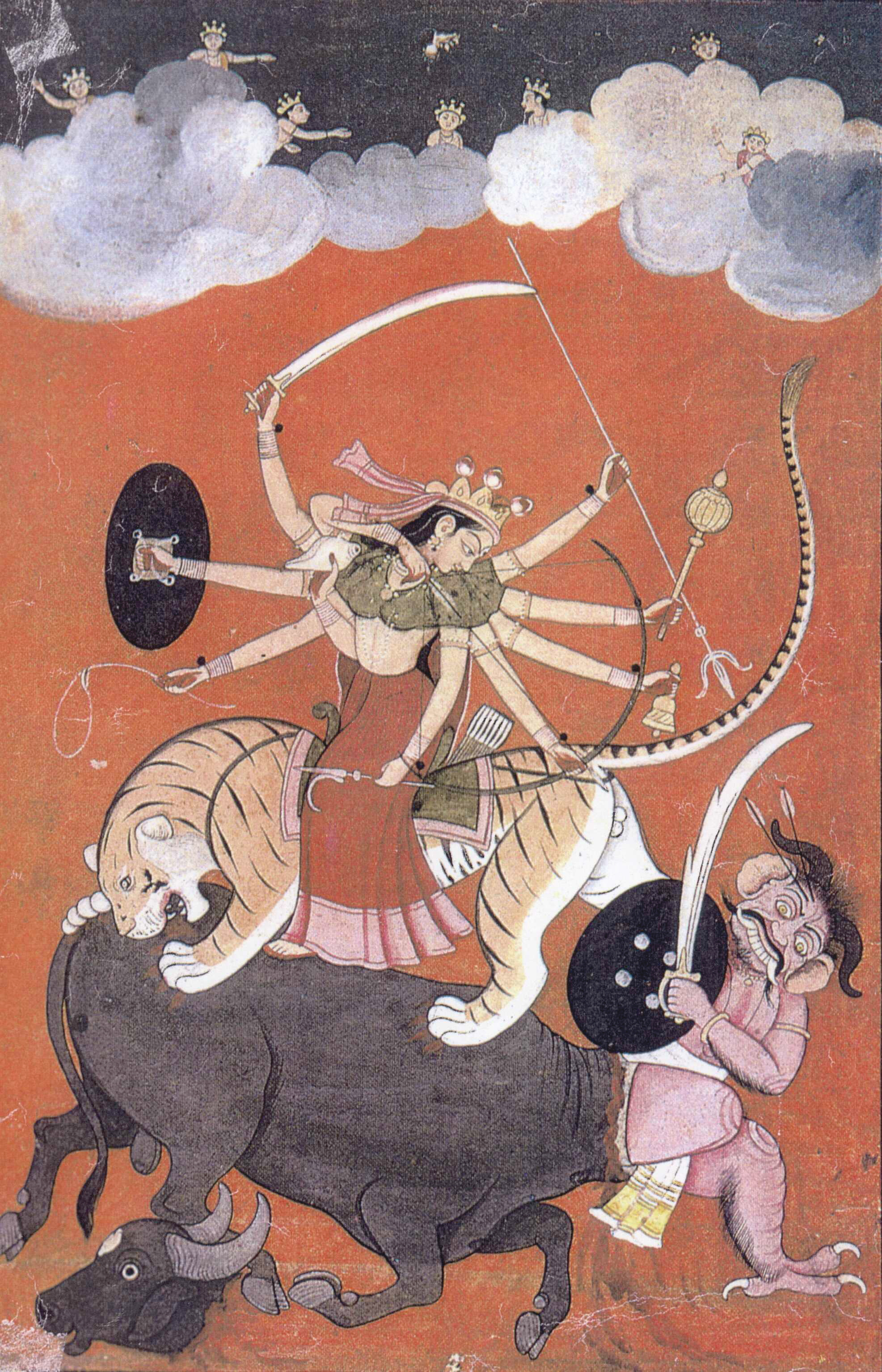
One aspect of the Goddess in the Devi Bhagavata Purana. The text describes many.

- The questions put by Janamejaya regarding Krishna's incarnation
- Details about Nara and Narayana
- The fight between the Risis and Prahlada
- Description about several avatars of Vishnu
- Explain about Devi's highest supremacy

=== Fifth Canto ===
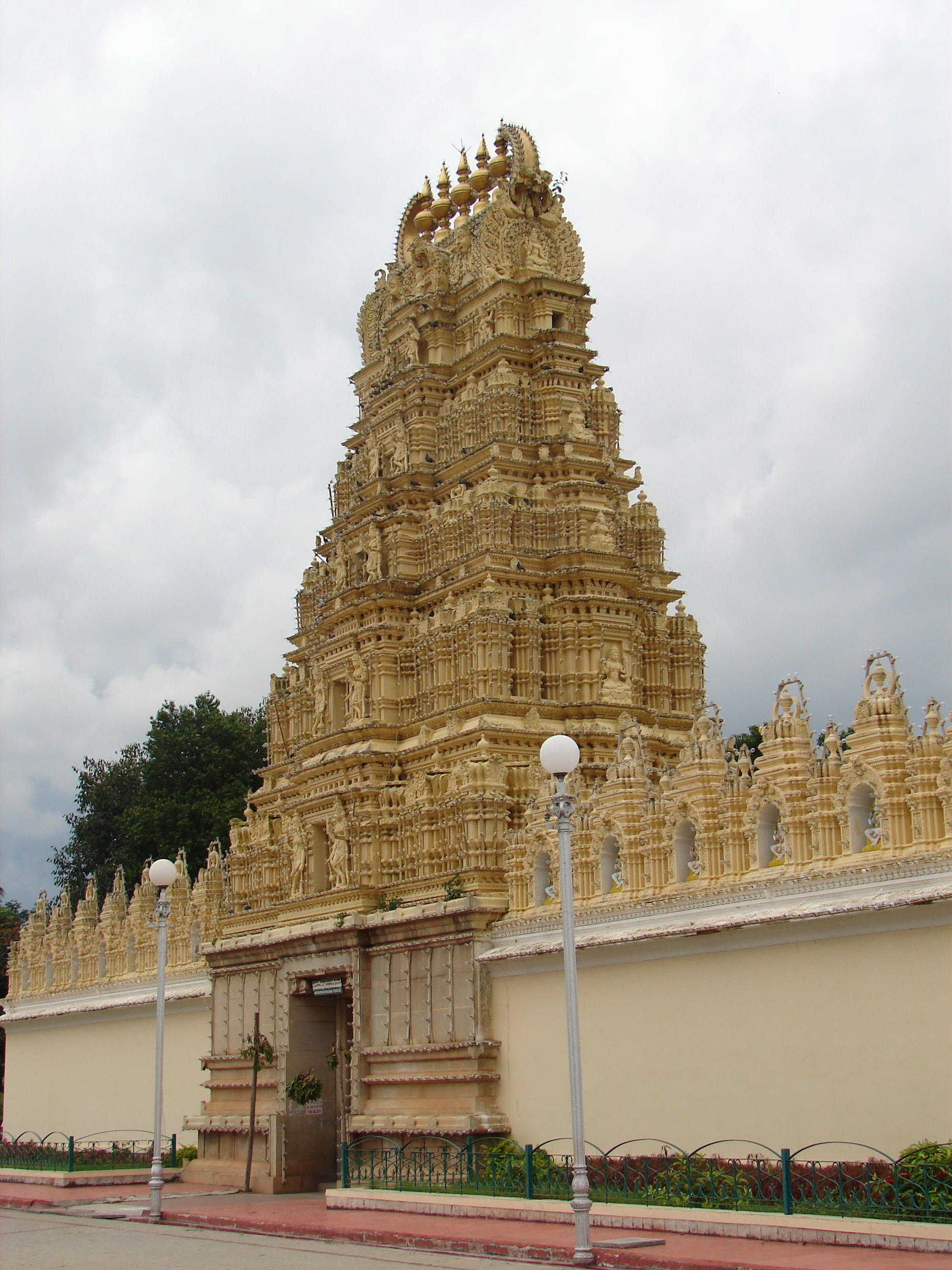
Bhuvaneshwari temple in Mysore Palace. Bhuvaneshwari is the supreme Goddess in Book 7 of this Purana.

Consisting of 35 chapters, the canto mentions the glory of Devi (Devi Mahatmya), fight between Durga and Mahishasura, killing of Sumbha and Nisumbha and other demons.

- Devi Mahatmya - Story of Mahishasura and the origin of goddess Mahalakshmi
- The conquest of the Heavens by Shumba - Nishumbha and Birth of Devi Kaushiki
- The story of King Suratha and a Vaishya who heard the Devi Mahatmyam from a sage, received the nine-syllable mantra from him and performed severe austerities and worshiped the Devi.
- The methods of Devi worship, worship of Devi either in a metal image or in a Yantra

=== Sixth Canto ===
Consisting of 31 chapters, The sixth book continue these legends, states Rocher, with half of the chapters focussed on the greatness of Goddess, how male gods are befuddled by problems, how they run to her for help, and how she solves them because she is enlightened knowledge. The text presents the feminine to whom all masculine deities are subordinate and dependent on. Its also include Indra killing of Vritra.

- Tvashtr create a son named Vishvarupa and Indra kills Visvarupa.
- Tvashtr's rage and creation of Vritra from the sacrificial fire and the slaying of Vṛitrasura
- Indra's expulsion from heaven, Sachi worship of Devi Bhuvaneshvari and Nahusha taking Indra's place.
- The birth of Mitra Varuṇa
- The origin of the Haihaya Dynasty
- Details of holy rivers, mountains, lakes and places sacred to the Goddess.
- The marriage of Narada and his face getting transformed into that of a monkey

=== Seventh Canto ===
Consisting of 40 chapters, The seventh canto of the Srimad Devi-Bhagavatam shifts towards more philosophy, asserting its version of the essence of the Vedas. This book contains the philosophical text called Devi Gita, or the "Song of the Goddess". The Goddess explains she is the Brahman that created the world, asserting the Advaita premise that spiritual liberation occurs when one fully comprehends the identity of one's soul and the Brahman. This knowledge, asserts the Goddess, comes from detaching self from the world and meditating on one's own soul. Chapter 28 of the seventh book contain the story of Durgamasur and his annihilation by goddess Sivaa (Parvati) in her form of Shakambhari.

- Description of the Solar and Lunar Kings
- The story of Satyavrata
- The birth of Devi Gauri, the seats of the Deity, and the distraction of Shiva
- Supreme goddess takes Universal Virat rupa and Self-realization, Spoken by the supreme Mother

This canto, states Rocher, also includes sections on festivals related to Devi, pilgrimage information and ways to remember her. Her relationship with Shiva and the birth of Skanda is also briefly mentioned in the 7th book. The last ten chapters (31 to 40) of the canto 7 is the famous and philosophical Devi Gita, which often circulates in the Hindu tradition as a separate text.

=== Eighth Canto ===
Consisting of 24 chapters, The eighth book of the Devi-Bhagavata Purana incorporates one of the five requirements of Puranic-genre of Hindu texts, that is a theory of the geography of the earth, planets and stars, the motion of sun and moon, as well as explanation of time and the Hindu calendar. Its include:

- In the beginning of creation Manu (Hinduism) praise Devi and Lord taking Varaha avatar
- Divisions of Bhu Mandala with Seven islands
- Various avatars of Vishnu worship in Jambudvīpa
- Description of the movement of the Moon and other planets.
- Narada worship and praises Lord Ananta
- Description about nether worlds and different hells

=== Ninth Canto ===
The largest canto is the 9th skandha Consisting of 50 chapters, which is very similar in structure and content of the Prakriti-kanda of the Brahmavaivarta Purana. Both are goddess-focused and discuss her theology, but have one difference. The Prakriti-kanda of the Brahmavaivarta Purana also includes many verses which praise Vishnu and use various names (incarnations), which re-appear in the 9th book of the Devi Bhagavata Purana, with Vishnu's names substituted with Devi's names (incarnations). It also mentioned Krishna as the male form of goddess.

- Description of five forms of Devi Prakriti
- Manifestation of Shri Krishna and description of first creation (Sarga)
- Birth of Brahma, Vishnu and Shiva
- Lakshmi, Saraswati and Ganga (goddess) mutually curse each other and descend them on Bharatavarsha.
- Description of the period of Kali Yuga.
- Story of Devi Tulsi
- Significance and attributes of Bhagavati Bhuvaneshvari
- Goddess Mahalakshmi manifests from ocean of milk
- Description of mantras and songs of praise to Devi Radha and goddess Durga.

=== Tenth Canto ===
Consisting of 13 chapters, This Canto of the Devi-Bhagavata Purana is one of the shortest, and integrates manavantaras, another structural requirement for this text to be a major Purana, but wherein the Devi is worshiped in every cosmic time cycle, because she is the greatest, she kills the evil and she nurtures the good.Chapter 13 of the tenth book describes the glory of goddess Bhramri that how in the past she killed the demon Arunasura.

- The creation Swayambhu Manu and Description of other Manus.
- Narada describes the greatness of Vindhya who tries to stop the path of Sun God.
- Method of Panchayatana Puja
- The anecdote of the King Suratha
- The story of Bhramari Devi

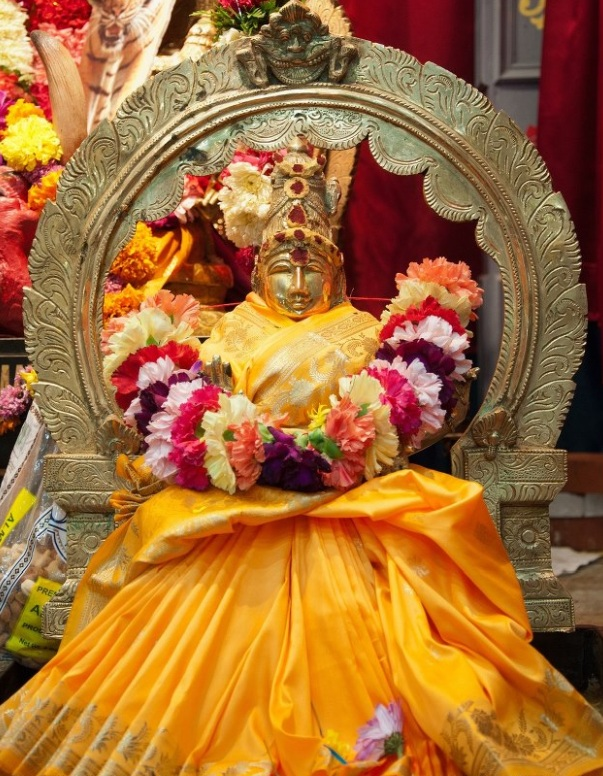
Devi Bhuvaneshwari

=== Eleventh Canto ===
Consisting of 24 chapters, This canto of the text discusses Sadachara (virtues) and Dharma to self as an individual, as belonging to a Grama (village, community) and to a Desha (country). The text praises Sruti and asserts it to be the authoritative source, adding that Smriti and Puranas are also sources for guidance. This section is notable for adding that Tantra is also a source of guidance, but only if it does not conflict with the Vedas. Verses in the 11th books also describe sources for Rudraksha as Japa beads, the value of Tripundra mark on the forehead, five styles of Sandhyas (reflection, meditation) and five types of Yajnas.

- The glories of the Rudrakṣa beads and Bhasma
- The rules of using the Tripuṇḍra and Urdhapundra marks
- Description of the Greatness of the Devi Puja
- The description of Sandhya Upasana

=== Twelfth Canto ===
The last and 12th canto of the Devi-Bhagavatam Consisting of 14 chapters, Its describes the Goddess as the mother of the Vedas, she as the Adya Shakti (primal, primordial power), and the essence of the Gayatri mantra. The verses map every syllable of the Gayatri mantra to 1008 names of reverence in the Hindu tradition. These names span a spectrum of historic sages, deities, musical meters, mudras and the glories of the goddesses. Also, from Chapter 10 to Chapter 12, a description is provided of the supreme abode of Devi called Manidvipa, which is above Vaikuntha and Goloka.

- One thousand and eight names of Gayatri
- The story of Uma Haimavati
- Effects of Gayatri upasana
- Janamejaya's Devi-yajna
- Glory of Devi Bhagavata as the essence of all the Vedas and Puranas.

=== Devi Gita ===
Main articles: Devi Gita

The Devi Gita, like the Bhagavad Gita, is a condensed philosophical treatise. It presents the divine female as a powerful and compassionate creator, pervader and protector of the universe. She is, states Brown, presented in the opening chapter of the Devi Gita as the benign and beautiful world-mother, called Bhuvaneshvari (literally, ruler of the universe, and the word is feminine). Thereafter, theological and philosophical teachings become the focus of the text, covering chapters 1 to 10 of the Devi Gita (or, chapters 31 to 40 of this Purana's Canto 7). Some of the verses of Devi Gita are almost identical to the Devi Upanishad.

The soul and the Goddess

[My sacred syllable हरीम] transcends, (Note: हरीम is pronounced as hrīm, it is a tantric mantra beej, and it identifies a "Shakti".)
the distinction of name and named,
beyond all dualities.
It is whole,
infinite being, consciousness and bliss.
One should meditate on that reality,
within the flaming light of consciousness.
Fixing the mind upon me,
as the Goddess transcending all space and time,
One quickly merges with me by realizing,
the oneness of the soul and Brahman.

— Devi Gita, Transl: Lynn Foulston, Stuart Abbott
Devibhagavata Purana, Book 7

The Devi Gita frequently explains Shakta ideas by quoting from the Bhagavad Gita. The Devi is described by the text as a "universal, cosmic energy" resident within each individual, weaving in the terminology of Samkhya school of Hindu philosophy. It is suffused with Advaita Vedanta ideas, wherein nonduality is emphasized, all dualities are declared as incorrect, and interconnected oneness of all living being's soul with Brahman is held as the liberating knowledge. However, adds Tracy Pintchman, Devi Gita incorporates Tantric ideas giving the Devi a form and motherly character rather than the gender-neutral concept of Adi Shankara's Advaita Vedanta.

The Bhakti theology of the Devi Gita part of this Purana may have been influenced by the Bhagavad Gita, and with Vaishnava concepts of loving devotion to Krishna found in the Bhagavata Purana. All these texts highlight different types of devotion in a Samkhya philosophy framework. The text asserts that Tamasic Bhakti is one where the devotee prays because he is full of anger and seeks to harm or induce pain or jealousy to others. Rajasic Bhakti is one where the devotee prays not to harm others, but to gain personal advantage, fame or wealth. Sattvic Bhakti is the type where the devotee seeks neither advantage nor harm to others but prays to purify himself, renounce any sins and surrender to the ideas embodied as Goddess to liberate himself.

== Philosophy ==
=== Vedic literature ===
Devi Bhagavatam mentioned number of Vedic mantras connected with observance. In eleventh canto describes certain rites, also Devi is identified with Yajurveda and Rudra. In the ninth canto mentioned various phase powers of Devi. Dhyana stotras of Lakshmi and Svaha are adopted from Samaveda. Use of Rudrakshas mentioned in ninth canto is supported by the Sruti.

=== Upanishad ===
Devi Bhagavatam adopted some of the passages in the Upanishad. In the seventh canto of the purana, Devi describes her own form. These verses are identical with some verses of the Devi Upanishad. Also, in the fourth canto some famous expressions of Taittiriya Upanishad are used to describe the nature of Devi.

=== Samkhya ===
Devi Bhagavatam belongs to the Shaktadvaitavada tradition (syncretism of Samkhya and Advaita Vedanta; literally, the path of nondualistic Shakti). The duality of Prakṛti and Purusha in Samkhya is also acknowledged by Devi Bhagavatam as it covers wide range of different philosophies. In the text prakriti is identified with Parashakti. She is also called Mulaprakriti (root prakriti).

=== Bhakti ===
Main articles: Bhakti and Bhakti yoga

The Devi Bhagavata Purana adds Para Bhakti (Sanskrit: दवी) in Devi Gita as the highest level of devotion, states McDaniel, where the devotee seeks neither boon nor liberation but weeps when he remembers her because he loves the Goddess, when he feels her presence everywhere and sees the Goddess in all living beings, he is intoxicated by her ideas and presence.

=== Advaita ===
Advaita Vedanta concepts can be seen throughout the Devi Bhagavata Purana. One of the main Advaita concepts found in the Purana is the concept that the individual self and the Supreme Self are one. As P. G. Lalye states that the Advaita Vedanta concept most prominent in the Devi Bhagavata Purana is the non-dual unity of the Goddess.

=== Karma ===
Lalye state that Devi Bhagavatam has described many events that directly affect karma. In purana Vyasa, Narada and Narayana are exponents of Karma theory. He further states that one's actions must be forgiven. As the action is, so is the result. In this narrative the theory of karma and the theory of destiny are mixed together in the Purana.

== Significance ==
The Devi Bhagavata Purana promotes devotion to the Goddess. As Lynn Foulston states, the text was written to satisfy Shakti devotees. He further mentions that the Devi Gita in the seventh Canto is the Shakta alternative to the Bhagavad Gita.

=== Hindu Festivals ===
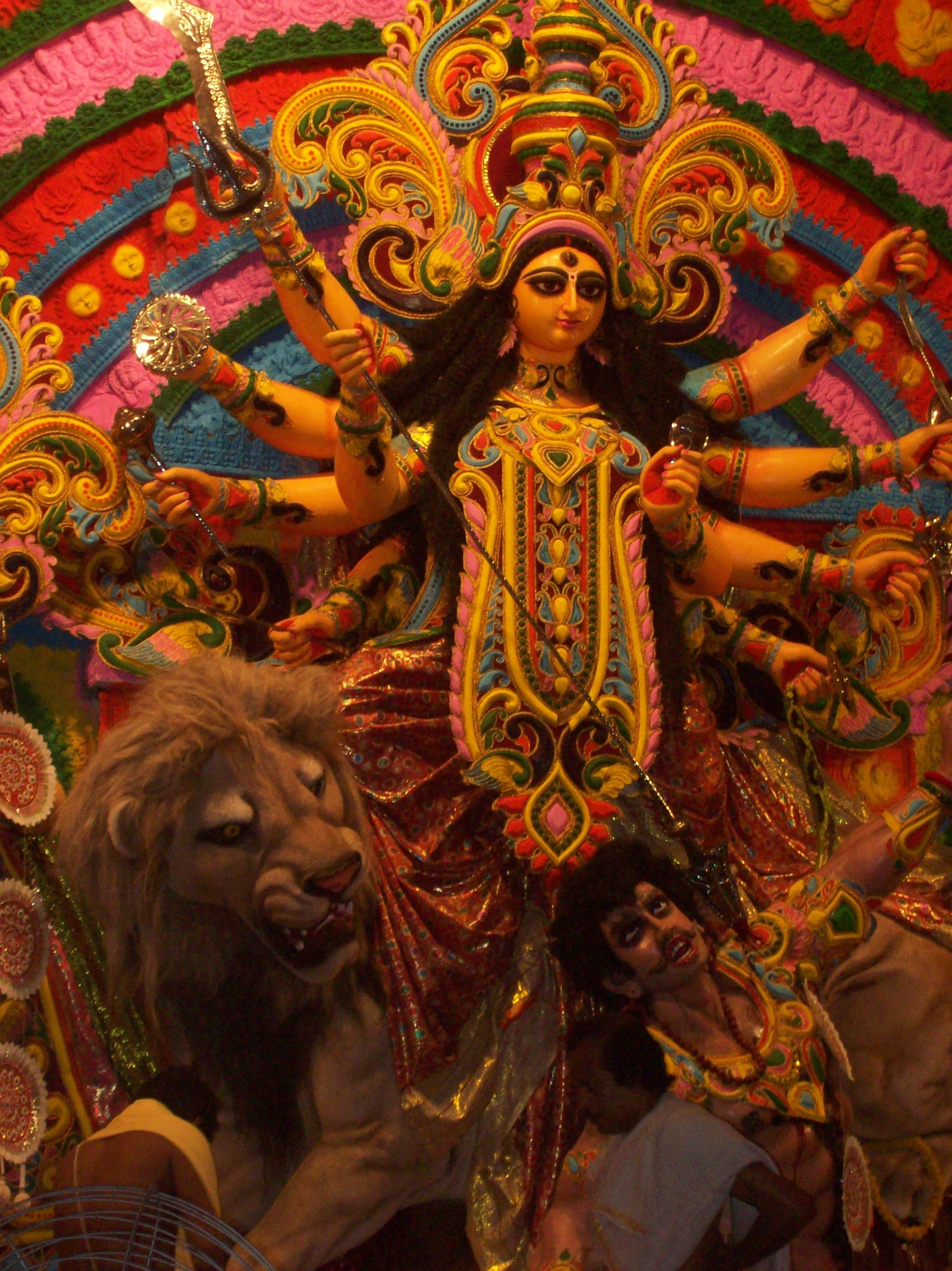
Durga Puja in Navaratri

Devi Bhagavatam also mentions the Navaratri festival which is a special festival of Goddess and the rituals to be performed on that festival and about the Navaratri Puja performed by Rama on Ashtami night.

In the thirteenth chapter of the Ninth canto mentions, the Hindu festival of Dola Purnima, celebrated during Holi.

=== shaktism ===
Divya Jyoti Jagrati Sansthan, a non-profit organization, performs the rituals of the Devi Bhagavatam and preaches its stories.

When Swami Vivekananda talks about Para bhakti, the highest form of devotion to Brahman, he gives examples and definitions from the Devi Bhagavata Purana.

Sanyal states that Devi Bhagavata Parayana is still popular in Uttar Pradesh, Rajasthan, Maharashtra etc.

== Reception ==
The verses and ideas in the Devi-Bhagavata Purana, state Foulston and Abbott, are built on the foundation of the Upanishads wherein the nonduality and oneness of Brahman and Atman (soul) are synthesized. The text makes references to the philosophy and metaphors used in the Advaita Vedanta tradition of Adi Shankara. However, those ideas are reformulated and centered around the Goddess in the Devi Bhagavata Purana, states C Mackenzie Brown, as well as other scholars. In Devi Bhagavata text, states Tracy Pintchman, the Devi is not only Brahman-Atman (soul, interconnected oneness), she is also the always-changing empirical reality (Maya).

The Goddess, in Devi Bhagavata Purana, is both the source of self-bondage through Avidya (ignorance) and the source of self-liberation through Vidya (knowledge), state Foulston and Abbott. She is identical to the Vedic metaphysical reality concept of Brahman, the supreme power, the ruler of the universe, the hero, the hidden energy, the power, the bliss innate in everything, according to the text. The Devi, states Kinsley, is identified by this Purana to be all matter, mother earth, the cosmos, all of nature including the primordial. The Goddess is presented, states Brown, as "the womb of the universe", who observes the actions of her children, nurtures them to discover and realize their true nature, forgive when they make mistakes, be fearsomely terrible to the wicked that threaten her children, and be friend of all souls.

Cynthia Humes compares the depiction of Goddess in the 6th-century Hindu text Devi Mahatmya, with that in this later Devi-Bhagavata Purana text. Both revere the feminine, states Humes, but there are some important differences. Nowhere does the Devi Mahatmya state anything negative about women, and it is explicit in asserting that "all women are portions of the Goddess". By contrast, states Humes, the portrayal of women in Devi-Bhagavata Purana is more complex. It includes verses critical of the feminine, with the text stating that behavior of woman can be "reckless, foolish, cruel, deceitful" and the like. The Devi Bhagavata also praises women and describes their behavior can be "heroic, gentle, tenacious, strong" and the like.

As Hazra points out, in some parts of the Devi Bhagavata Purana, Vishnu is shown as the supreme deity, and in some parts Shiva is shown superior to Vishnu and Krishna. In the ninth canto, Krishna is shown as Para-Brahman. He further shows that the author of this Purana has composed it in such a way as to be consistent with all the Hindu sects, without contradicting the views of any sect.

The Devi-Bhagavata Purana is an important and historic Shakta Bhakti text, states June McDaniel.

== Commentaries and translations ==
=== Commentaries ===
- Studies in Devi Bhagavata - P.G. Layle
- Srimad Devi Bhagavatam with the Tika of Nilakantha
- Discourses on the Devi Bhagavatam - Pt Vidur Prasad Dahal
- The Triumph of the Goddess : The Canonical Models and Theological Visions of the Devi-Bhagavata Purana

=== Translations ===
The Devi Bhagavata Purana has been translated into different languages.

==== Telugu ====
- Mulugu Papayaradhya, an 18th-century Telugu poet, is regarded as the first poet to translate the Devi Bhagavata Purana into Telugu.
- Tirupati Venkata Kavulu also translated this purana into Telugu language in 1896 entitled Devi Bhagavatamu. They have divided the purana into 6 skandas and themselves published it in 1920.
- Dasu Sriramulu (1846 -1908) a scholar, composer, poet, Avadhani, orator, proficient in astrology and dramaturgy, translator, founder of a music school, nationalist and social reformer and author of kavyalu, Satakas, plays, musical and dance compositions in Telugu. He translated many satakams and plays from Sanskrit into Telugu. He translated Sri Devi Bhagavatham, which was first published in 1907.
- Sri Devi Bhagavatham by Acharya Bethavolu Ramabrahmam in 2005
- Sri Devi Bhagavatam translated by Smt. S Rukminamma

==== Kannada ====
- Edatore Chandrashekhara Sastry has translated the entire Devi Bhagavatam to Kannada with Sanskrit Text. This was published in 11 volumes at Mysore. (Jayachamarajendra Grantha Ratna Mala - 5)
- Sri Devi Bhagavata by Pavana Sutha

==== Malayalam ====
- Srimad Devi Bhagavatam translated by Varavoor Shamu Menon and Dr. N. P Unni
- Shrimad Devi Bhagavata published by Aarshasri Publications Co

==== Hindi ====
- Devi Bhagavatam published by Gita Press
- Shri Mad Devi Bhagwat Mahapuran by Laxmi prakashan
- Shrimad Devi Bhagavata Purana in Simple Hindi Language by Gita Press
- A Synopsis of Devi Bhagawat by Gita Press
- Srimad Devi Bhagawat Mahapurana by Shivjeet Singh

==== Gujarati ====
- શરીમદ દવી ભાગવત: Shrimad Devi Bhagavata Purana by Harendra Shukla

==== Bengali ====
- Devi Bhagavatam by Navabharat Publishers, Kolkata

==== Nepali ====
- Srimad Devi Bhagawat Mahapuran (Nepali) translated by Gaurishankar Vasistha (SRI DURGA SAHITYA BHANDAR, VARANASI)

==== Tamil ====
- Devi Bhagavatam - Karthikeyan by Giri Trading Agency private limited
- Sri Devi Bhagavatha 3 parts translated by Durgadoss S.K.Swami and Prema Pirasuram
- Shrimad Devi Bhagavata Purana in Tamil (Set of 2 Volumes) by Vidya Venkataraman
- Sri Devi Bhagavatham by Acharya Bethavolu Ramabrahmam - V.G.S Publishers

==== English ====
- Swami Vijnanananda translated the Devi Bhagavatam to English with Sanskrit Text.
- Srimad Devi Bhagavatam (2 Volumes) by C. P. Balachandran Nair
- Ramesh Menon translated condensed English version of The Devi Bhagavatam in 2010
- Srimad Devibhagavata Puranam (Sanskrit Text with English Translation in Two Volumes) by Bahadur Sris Chandra
- Sampoorna Devi Bhagavatham by Sadguru Vaddiparti Padmakar
- Srimad Devi Bhagavatam (2 Volumes): English Version Prose by C. P. Balachandran Nair

==== German ====
- Shrīmad Devī Bhāgavatam: Mutter Natur in Aktion by Michael Stibane

==== Russian ====
- Девибхагавата-Пурана. В 6 томах (Devi Bhagavata Purana) - Клуб Касталия (Kastalia Club)

== See also ==
- Mahadevi
- Shaktism
- Puranas
