= Bhuvaneshvari =

Hindu goddess

- One of the Highest Forms of Mahadevi and Para Brahman in Shaktism
- Member of The Ten Mahavidyas
- Devanagari: भुवनेश्वरी
- Sanskrit transliteration: Bhuvaneśvarī
- Affiliation: Brahman; Shakti; Mahadevi; Parvati; Bhavani; Durga
- Abode: Manidvipa
- Weapon: Noose, goad
- Mount: Lion
- Texts: Devi Bhagavata Purana
- Festivals: Navaratri, Bhuvaneshwari Jayanti, Adi-Puram
- Consort: Shiva as Bhuvneshwarā

Bhuvaneshvari (Sanskrit: भुवनेश्वरी, IAST: Bhuvaneśvarī) is a Hindu goddess. She is the fourth amongst the ten Mahavidya goddesses in Shaktism, and one of the highest aspects of Mahadevi. She is identified as form of Adi Parashakti in the Devi Bhagavata Purana.

== Etymology ==
The word Bhuvaneshvari is a compound of the words Bhuvana Ishwari, meaning "Goddess of the world" or "Queen of the universe", where the worlds are the tri-bhuvana or three regions of bhooḥ (Earth), bhoovaḥ (atmosphere) and svaḥ (Heavens).

== Legends ==
According to David Kinsley, there is an origin myth from a contemporary Hindi-language source that states that Surya created the three worlds after being offered Soma by Rishis and being empowered by Tripura Sundari, the main Shakti of that time. After having empowered Surya to create the worlds, the goddess "assumed an appropriate form and pervaded and directed the triple world". This form of her became known as Bhuvaneshwari, meaning goddess of the world". This myth emphasises that Bhuvaneshwari is a form of Tripura Sundari.

== See also ==
- Devi
- Lingaraja Temple
