= Ishvara Gita =

Ancient philosophical text

The Ishvara Gita is a Shavite philosophical text from Kurma Purana. It follows the earliest Shaiva doctrine of the Vedic mahapashupata school with its scripture Atharvashiras Upanishad and predates the reformed Lakulish pashupata that appeared around 3000 BCE according to the chronology in Vayu Purana. This is not to be confused with Shiva Gita which is a similar text from the Padma Purana.

Pashupata means "the way to Pashupati" whereas Pashupati is defined as "Lord Protector of Animals". It is one of the names of God Shiva.

The text deals with topics such as Shiva Advaita (Shaiva nondualism) metaphysics, relations Shiva-brahman-Linga, yoga, recitations of om and of the hymn Shatarudriya from Yajurveda, and others

== Structure ==
The Ishvara Gita consists of 11 chapters with over 768 verses which deals with topics such as worship of the Siva Lingam, Shiva Advaita metaphysics, Omni-Potence of the Śiva-Liṅga, Bhakti, Significance of OM, Theophany of Śiva (śiva-prādurbhāva-ākhya), forms of Shiva (Aṣṭa Mūrtis) and others

== Contents ==
The Ishvara Gita contains many new themes that are not found in The Bhagavad Gita, such as worship of the Shiva Lingam and the idea of Śiva as the ultimate God. It also equalizes Shiva with brahman (absolute) as well as brahman with the linga. Shiva is in the form of a Linga which means a "mark" of the presence of God. Its philosophy is rooted in the Vedic Puranic tradition and does not have tantric connotations.

The Īśvara Gītā teaches the highest 8-fold yoga of brahman which bears a resemblance to the later 8-fold (ashtanga) yoga of Patanjali, and by itself is a textbook of the pashupata school of Shaivism. Several commentaries on this text are available in manuscript form, including one by Vijñānabhikṣu, a 16th-century Hindu polymath.

The Īśvara Gītā has been translated into English, French and Italian in stand-alone form, and into English as part of a complete translation of The Kurma Purana.

== Primary sources: Sanskrit editions and translations ==
- Dumont, P.-E. (ed. and tr.) (1934). L’Īśvaragītā: Le Chant de Śiva. Baltimore: Johns Hopkins Press.
- Gupta, Anand Swarup (ed.) (1971). The Kūrma Purāṇa. Varanasi: All-India Kashiraj Trust.
- Nicholson, Andrew J. (tr.) (2014). Lord Siva's Song: The Isvara Gita. New York: SUNY Press.
- Piantelli, Mario (ed. and tr.) (1980). Īśvaragītā, o, Poema del Signore. Parma: L. Battei.
- Tagare, G.V. (tr.) (1982). The Kūrma Purāṇa, Part II. Delhi: Motilal Banarsidass.
- Cornerotte Hervé (2022). Ishwara Gita - Le chant du Seigneur Shiva. Allemagne: BOD-Books on Demand
