= Mahadevi =

Supreme goddess in Hinduism

- The Supreme Mother Goddess; Goddess of Power; Primordial Goddess; Para Brahman (the Ultimate Reality) in Shaktism
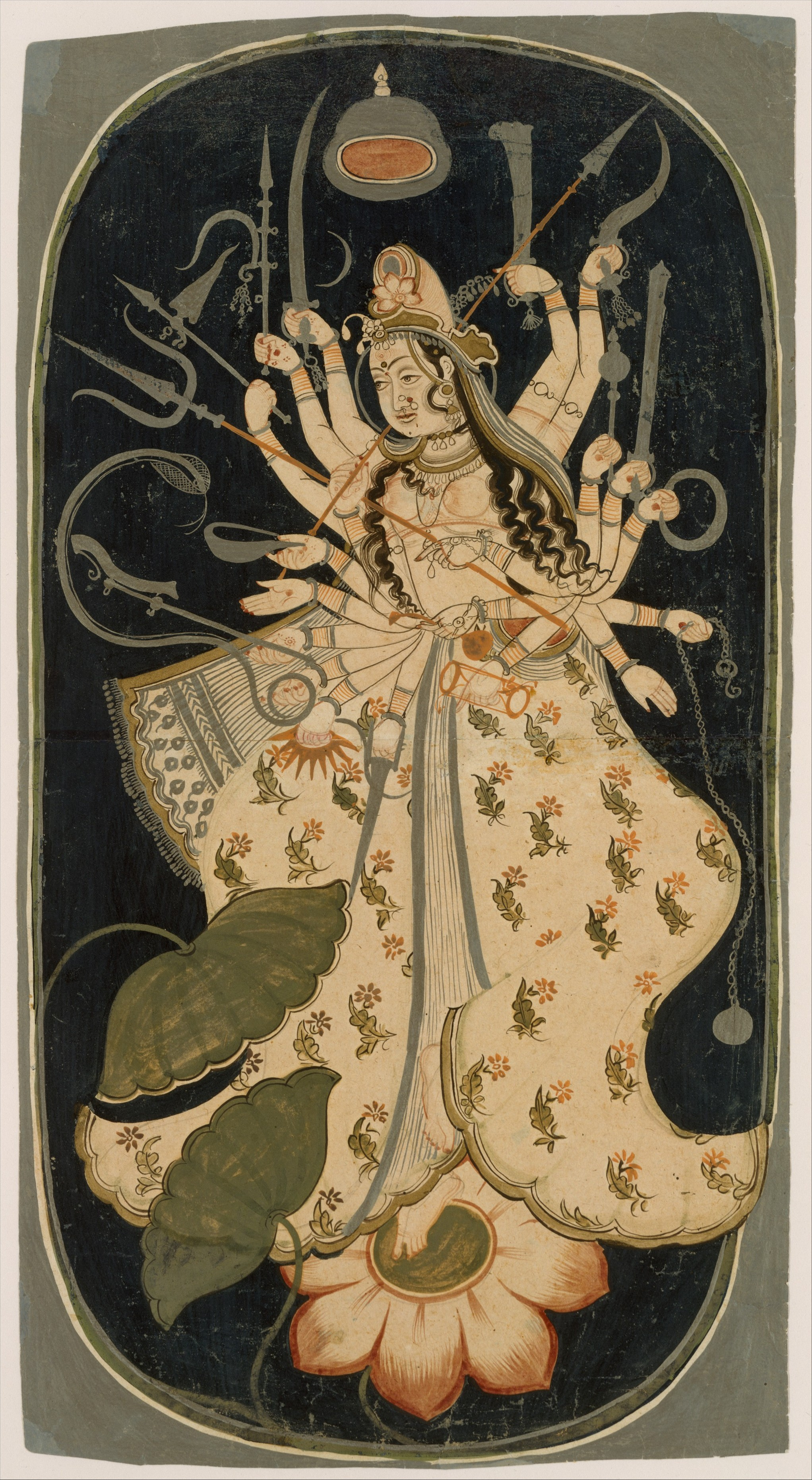
- An 18th-century painting of Mahadevi from Bikaner, Rajasthan
- Other names: Adi Parashakti; Mahamaya
- Devanagari: महादेवी
- Sanskrit transliteration: Mahādevī
- Affiliation: Durga; Lakshmi; Parvati; Saraswati; Gayatri; Radha; Tripura Sundari
- Abode: Manidvipa
- Mantra: Ōm āim hrīm śrīm klīm
- Weapon: Devi Chakra, Pasha, Ankusha, Trishula (trident)
- Symbol: Hreem, Om, Sri Yantra
- Mount: Lion
- Texts: Devi Mahatmya, Devi-Bhagavata Purana, Markandeya Purana, Brahmanda Purana, Kalika Purana, Lakshmi Tantra, Lalita Sahasranama, Soundarya Lahari, Shiva Purana, Shakta Upanishads such as the Devi Upanishad
- Festivals: Navaratri, Durga Puja, Vasanta Panchami, Lakshmi Puja, Kali Puja, Durga Ashtami, Lalita Jayanti, Adi-Puram

Mahadevi (Sanskrit: महादेवी, IAST: Mahādevī), also referred to as Mahamaya and Adi Parashakti, is the supreme goddess in Hinduism. According to the goddess-centric sect Shaktism, all Hindu gods and goddesses are manifestations of this great goddess, considered the ultimate reality or Para Brahman. In Shakta texts, Mahadevi is mentioned as Mulaprakriti (Primordial Goddess), having five primary forms—Parvati, Lakshmi, Sarasvati, Gayatri and Radha, collectively known as Panchaprakriti. Besides these, the goddesses Tripura Sundari and Durga are also identified with Mahadevi.

== Epithets and attributes ==
Mahadevi is known by many names in Hindu texts. These include Mulaprakrti ('she who is primordial matter') and Mahamaya ('she who is beyond maya').

The Devi Bhagavata Purana and Lalita Sahasranama describe Mahadevi's numerous epithets. These names include her divine and destructive characteristics. In the Devi Bhagavata Purana she is described as 'the mother of all', 'the life force in all beings', and 'she who is supreme knowledge'. The Lalita Sahasranama also describes her as Visvadhika ('she who transcends the universe'), Sarvaga ('she who is omnipresent'), Vishvadharini ('she who supports the universe'), Raksasaghni ('she who slays demons'), Bhairavi ('the terrible one'), and Samharini ('she who destroys'). Mahadevi's destructive features are further described in a hymn called the Aryastava, calling her Kalaratri ('night of death') and Nistha ('she who is death').

In the first episode of the Devi Mahatmya, Mahadevi is referred as Mahamaya, meaning the one who controls maya.

== Scriptural representation ==
=== Vedas ===
The Vedas name numerous forms of goddess such as Devi (power), Prithvi (earth), Aditi (cosmic moral order), Vāc (sound), Nirṛti (destruction), Ratri (night) and Aranyani (forest). Bounty goddesses such as Dinsana, Raka, Puramdhi, Parendi, Bharati, and Mahi are among others are mentioned in the Rigveda.

The Devīsūkta of the Rigveda (10.125.1 to 10.125.8) is among the most studied hymns, declaring that the ultimate reality is a goddess.

I have created all worlds at my will without being urged by any higher Being, and dwell within them. I permeate the earth and heaven, and all created entities with my greatness and dwell in them as eternal and infinite consciousness.

— Devi Sukta, Rigveda 10.125.8, Translated by June McDaniel

=== Upanishads ===
Shakta Upanishads are a group of minor Upanishads of Hinduism related to the Shaktism theology. There are eight Shakta Upanishads in the Muktika anthology of 108 Upanishads. The Shakta Upanishads are notable for declaring and revering the feminine as the Supreme, the primal cause and the metaphysical concepts in Hinduism called Brahman and Atman (soul).

=== Shakta Puranas ===
According to the Devi Bhagavata Purana Mahadevi is described in her form of Bhuvaneshvari. The text states that Shiva worshipped and meditated on the goddess for thousands of years using the bīja mantra "hrīm". The goddess is described as possessing both the aspects of Para Brahman: nirguna (without form) and saguna (with form). In her saguna form, she is extolled as the mother of the universe, residing upon the highest abode named Manidvipa. All other gods and goddesses are described as her various forms. In the Devi Mahatmya, the Trimurti and the demigods praise the goddess.

In the third canto of the Srimad Devi Bhagavatam, the Devi addresses the Trimurti, stating that there is no difference between herself and Purusha(the Supreme self), and that the perception of duality is an error.

In the Devi Gita of Devi Bhagavatam, it is suggested that before incarnating as Parvati, she appeared to King Himalaya and revealed divine, eternal knowledge to him. She explained herself, in the words of the Vedas, as having neither beginning nor end. She is the only, eternal truth. The whole universe is her creation. She is the only victor and the manifestation of victory itself. She is a manifested, un-manifested, and transcendent divinity. She then displayed her scarcely seen form to him: Satyaloka was located in her forehead; the created universe were her hairs; the sun and moon were her eyes; in her ears were the four directions; the Vedas were her words; death, affection and emotion were her teeth; Maya was manifested by her smile. The goddess Parvati, as Kushmanda, gives birth to the universe in the form of a cosmic egg which manifests as the universe. Ultimately, Adi Shakti herself is the energy which exists even after the destruction of the universe and before its creation.

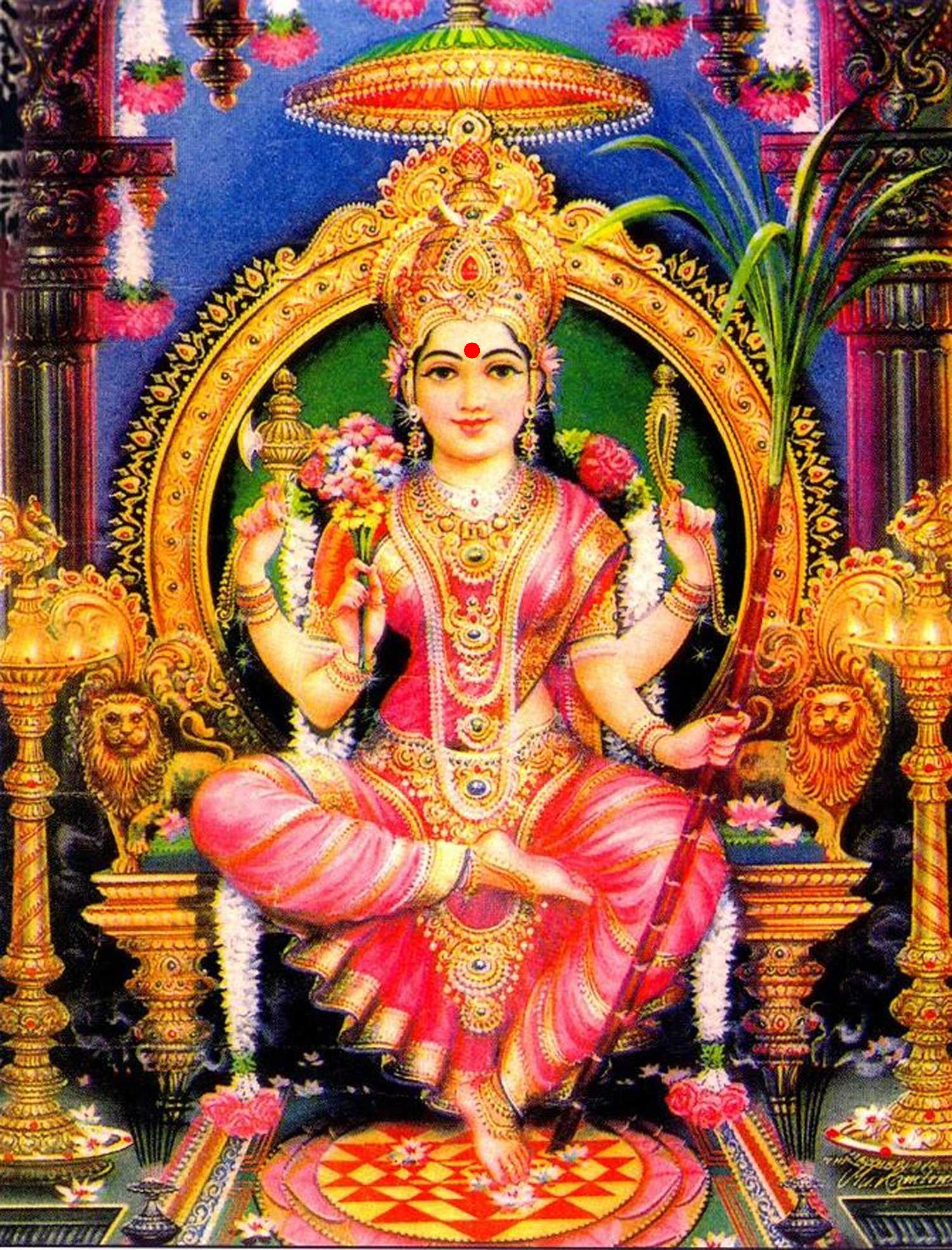
As Tripura Sundari, she is the complete supreme form.

According to the Tripura Rahasya, only Mahadevi was existed in her form of Tripura Sundari before the beginning of the universe. She is supposed to have created the Trimurti, and began the creation of the universe.

=== Shaiva Puranas ===
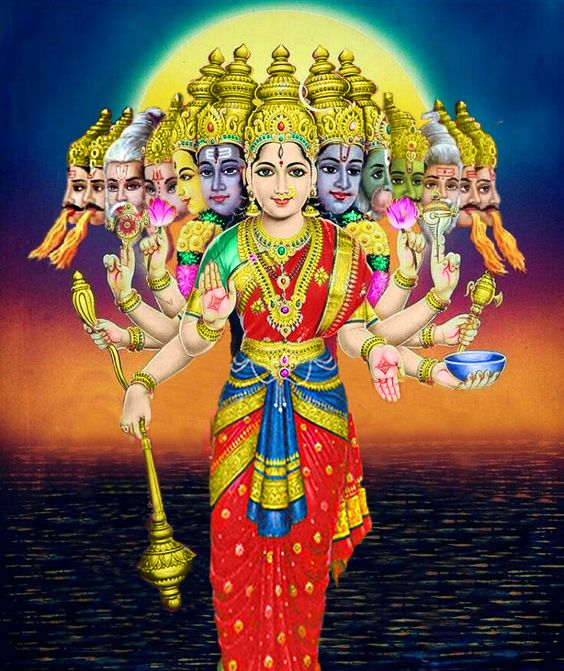
Adi Parashakti, the formless one who manifests all forms

The Shiva Purana says Adi Parashakti incarnated in materialistic form as Parama Prakriti from the left half of Shiva (Parabrahman) during the beginning of the universe. The Linga Purana states that Adi Shakti brings forth the evolution of life in every universe through the union of every Shiva and Parvati in all of the Universes.

That alone, Paramesvari of three attributes, creates the universe; she alone sustains it and she alone destroys it at the proper time.

— J.L.Shastri, Shiva Purana (Umasamhita), Chapter 45, Verse 49

I bow to the great Maya, the Yogic slumber, Uma, Sati, Kalaratri, Maharatri, Moharatri, greater than the greatest, the mother of the three deities, the eternal, the bestower of the fruits of the cherished desires of the devotees, the protectress of the gods and the ocean of mercy.

— J.L.Shastri, Shiva Purana (Umasamhita), Chapter 45, Verses 58-59

=== Vaishnava Puranas ===
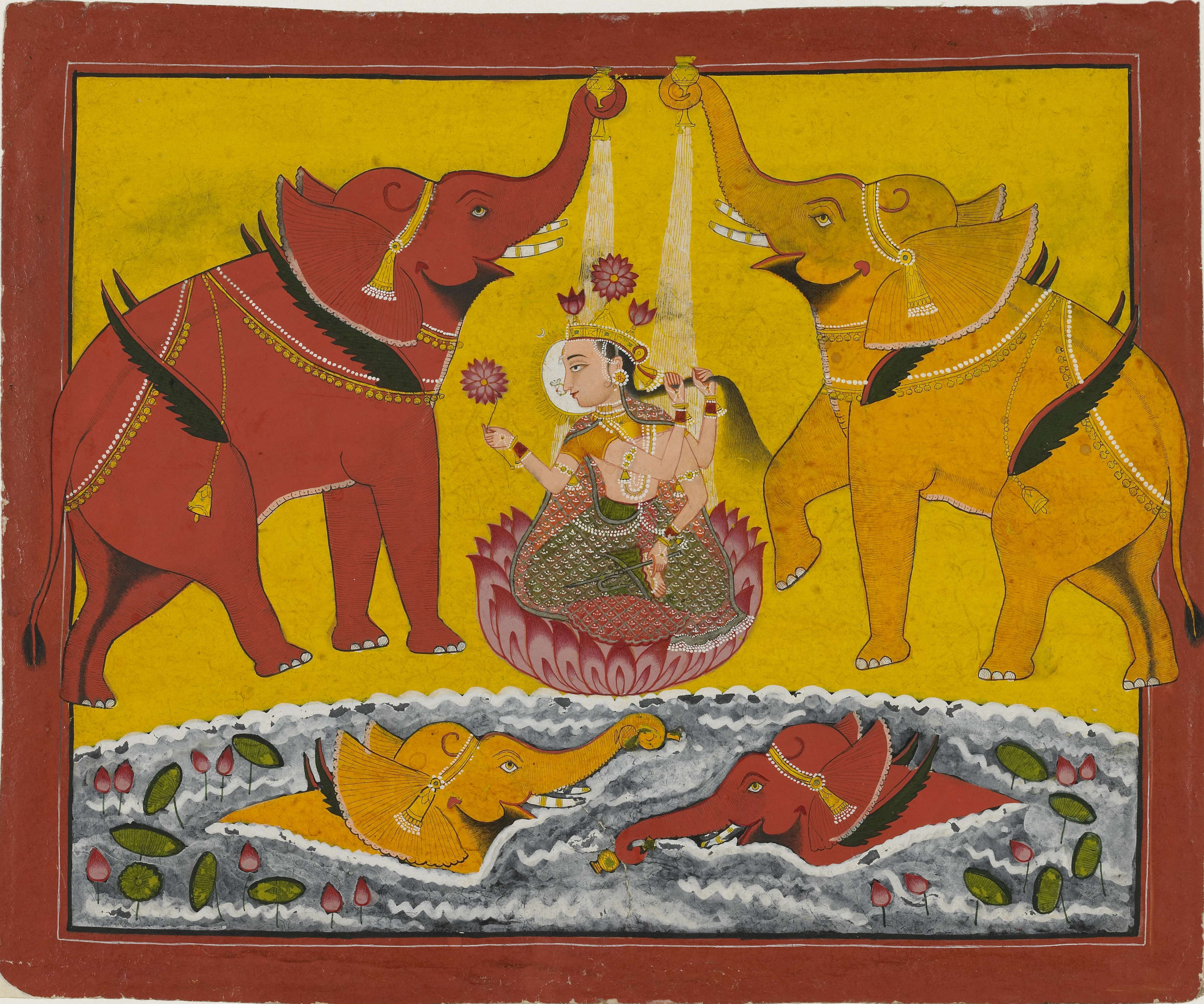
A painting of Lakshmi surrounded by two elephants

The goddess Lakshmi is revered as manifestation of Mahadevi in the Vaishnavite tradition, extolled to possess a thousand names and qualities. Various texts like the Garuda Purana, Bhagavata Purana, and Lakshmi Tantra refer to Lakshmi as form of Mahadevi. According to Devdutt Pattanaik, "Lakshmi is worshipped as maya, the delightful delusion, the dream-like expression of divinity that makes life comprehensible, hence worth living. She is true shakti, energy, boundless and bountiful".

=== Amsharupa ===
The Devi Bhagavata Purana also describes Amsharupas, which are partial manifestations of the Devī, distinct from her five complete forms. The text lists six Amsharupas, each associated with specific cosmic functions: Ganga, who flows as water and cleanses sins; Tulasi, a devotee of Vishnu who purifies and promotes well-being; Manasa, the daughter of Kashyapa associated with learning and mantras; Devasena (also known as Shasthi Devi), who grants offspring and protects children; Mangalachandika, who grants favorable outcomes, wealth, and welfare; and Bhumi, the earth goddess who embodies compassion, supports all plant life, and serves as the repository of gems.

== Iconography ==
Adi Parashakti is generally seen as an abstract goddess but her appearance is described in the Devi Bhagavata Purana, Kalika Purana, Markandeya Purana-Devi Mahatmya, Brahmanda Purana-Lalita Sahasranama, and the Tripura Rahasya. According to the Devi Bhagavata Purana, the goddess once invited the Trimurti to Manidvipa. According to the text, the Trimurti saw the goddess Bhuvaneshvari sitting on a jeweled throne. Her face radiated the light of millions of stars, and her celestial beauty was so great that the Trimurti could not look upon her. She carries the Abhaya and Varada Mudra, Pasha, and Ankusha.

According to Shakta traditions, Mahadevi is the ultimate goddess while Brahma, Vishnu, and Shiva are her subordinates who cannot function without her power. According to this belief, any deity worshipped is ultimately an expression of Mahadevi. According to the Srikula tradition in Shaktism, Tripura Sundari is the fore-most of the Mahavidyas, the highest aspect of Mahadevi and also the primary goddess of Sri Vidya. The Tripura Upanishad places her as the ultimate Shakti (energy, power) of the universe. In Vaishnavism, Lakshmi is traditionally worshipped as secondary to her consort Vishnu, and represents the bliss of a settled and domestic life. In Shaivism, the goddess Parvati is the complete incarnation of Mahadevi.

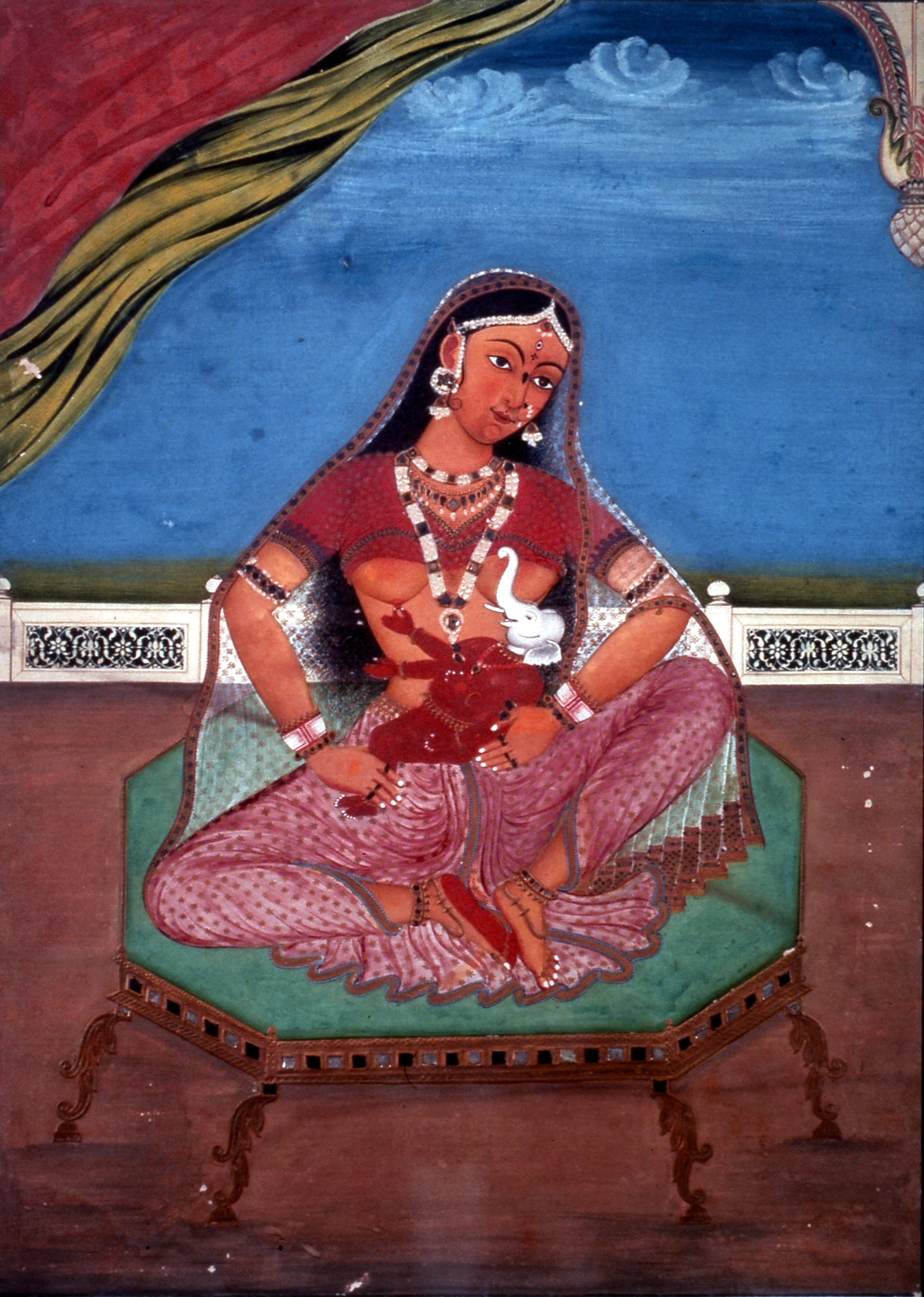
As Parvati, she is kind and tender and represents motherhood

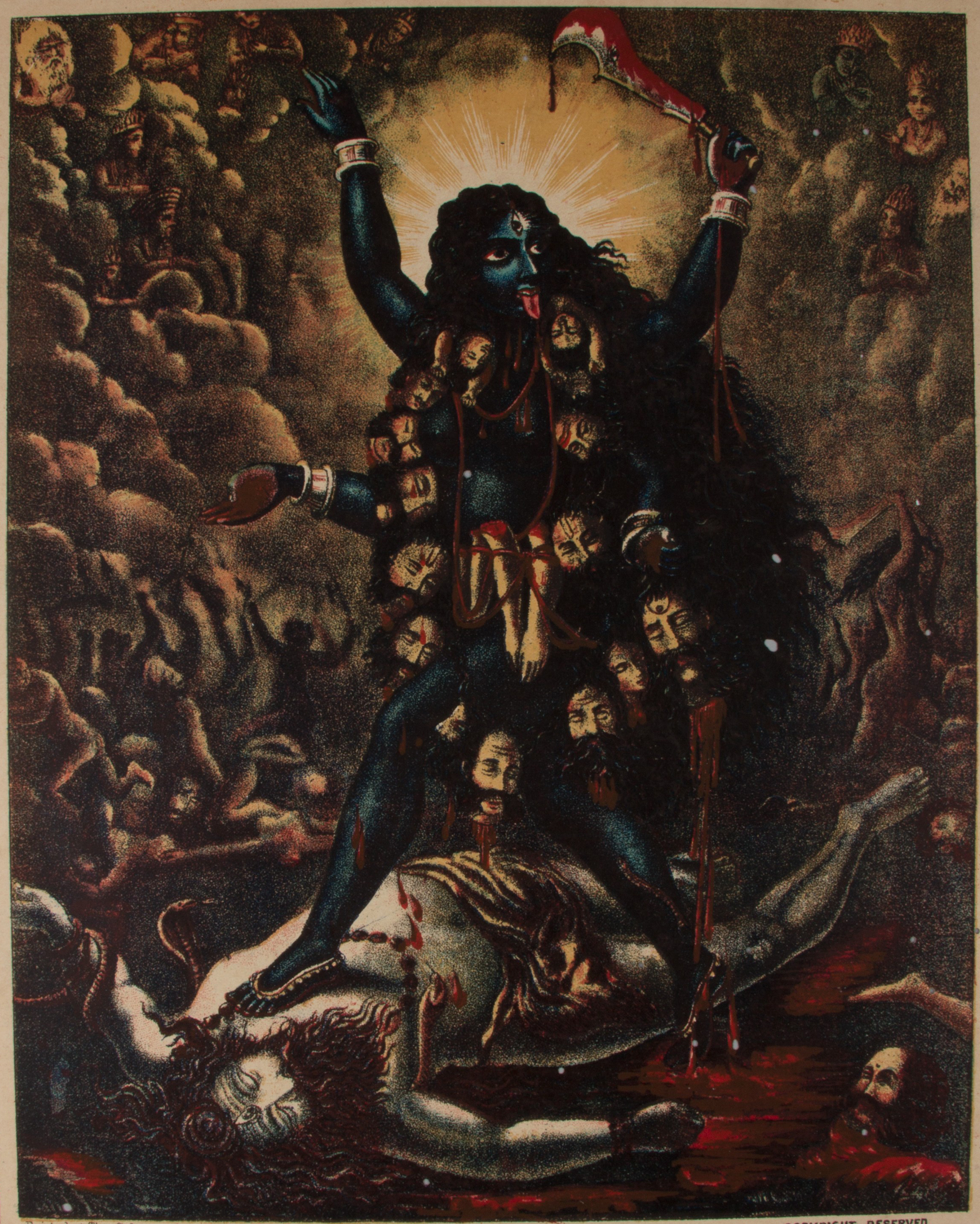
As Kali, she is ferocious and wrathful

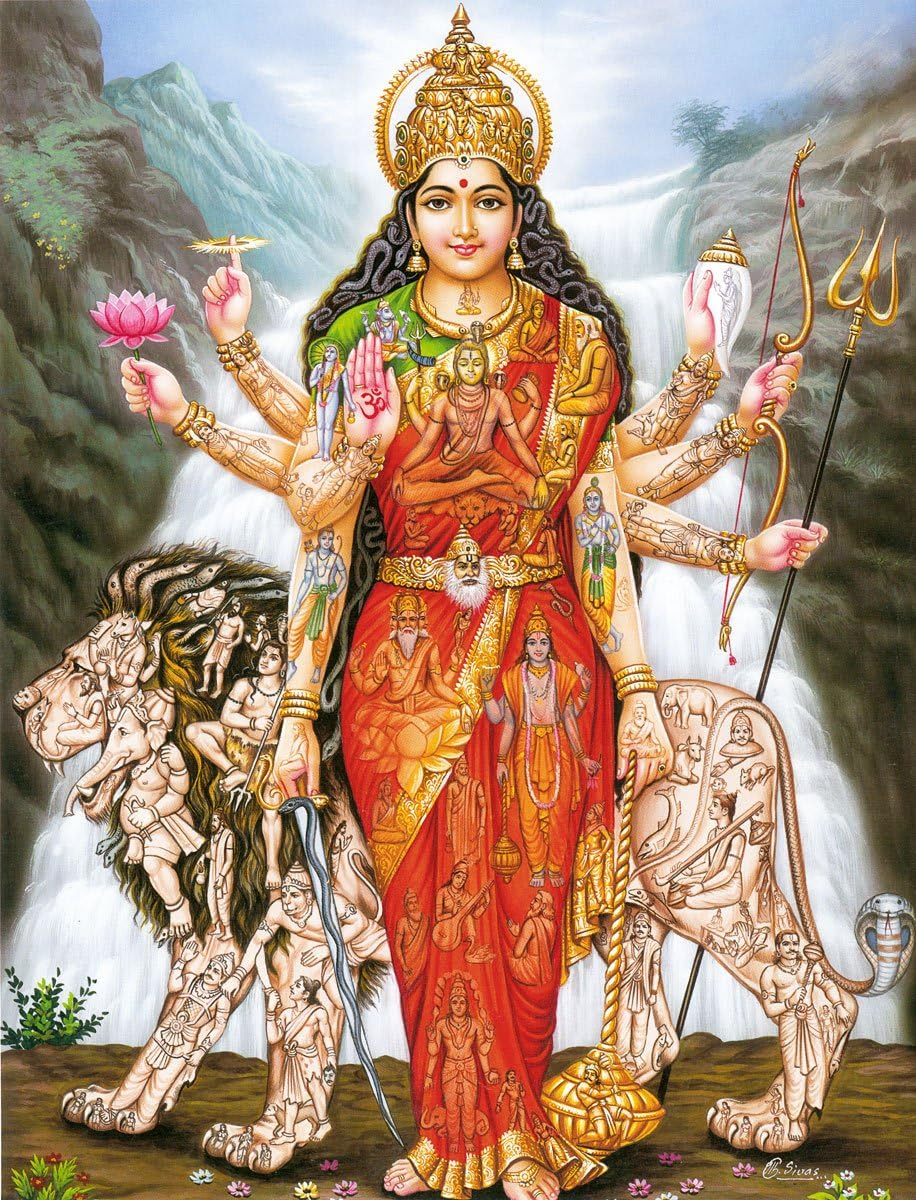
Durga's cosmic form, Adi Parashakti or Mahadevi as the Supreme Goddess encompassing all divinities.

=== Pancha Prakritis ===
According to the Devi Bhagavata Purana, Mahadevi is worshipped in five distinct forms: Durga (Parvati), Lakshmi, Sarasvati, Savitri (Gayatri), and Radha. These are collectively referred to as the Panchadevis or Panchaprakritis and are regarded as forms of Mahadevi.

In the same text, Durga(or Parvati), is described as the mother both Ganesha and Kartikeya and consort of Shiva. Devotees revere her as a force that upholds dharma, grants happiness, and the removes sorrows.

Lakshmi, is described as embodying wealth, beauty, compassion, and goodness. According to the Purana, she serves Vishnu in Vaikuntha, and manifesting prosperity in households.

Sarasvati, is presented as the deity of learning. bestowing intellect, poetic skill, reason, and logic upon devotees. She is described as the source of the fine arts and every branches of knowledge.

Savitri (or Gayatri) is identified as the mother of the four Vedas. The text describes her as representing the truth, existence, bliss, granting salvation and purifying the world.

Radha, the fifth of the Panchaprakritis, is said to preside over the five pranas. She is described as exceptionally beautiful and the consort of Krishna.

=== The ten Mahavidyas ===
The Mahavidyas are ten Tantric goddesses, or aspects, of Mahadevi that demonstrate her nature and ability to manifest in different forms. The word Mahavidya means 'Great Knowledge' and the epithet 'Dasamahavidyas' (the ten great mantras) is also used to refer to them. The Mahavidyas have been identified as a group since the tenth century CE and typically include, in order, Kali, Tara, Tripura Sundari, Bhuvaneshvari, Chinnamasta, Bhairavi, Dhumavati, Bagalamukhi, Matangi, and Kamala. Texts such as Guhydtiguhya-tantra, Todala-tantra, and Mundamala-tantra compare the ten Mahavidyas to the ten avatars of Vishnu. According to scholar David Kinsley, although the Mahavidyas serve less cosmic roles than the avatars of Vishnu, their purpose is to show that through her various forms, Mahadevi pervades all aspects of reality.

== See also ==
- Sophia - the transcendental wisdom as a feminine principle
- Tao - East Asian philosophy concept that represents the Ultimate Reality.
- Ultimate reality - the highest truth in different cultures and belief systems
