= Durgamasura =

Asura king in Hinduism

Durgama (Sanskrit: दुर्गम, romanized: Durgamā, lit. 'impervious'), also called Durgamasura (Sanskrit: दुर्गमसुर), is an asura king in Hindu mythology. His legend is associated with the origin of the goddess Shakambhari.

== Legend ==
=== Devi Bhagavata Purana ===
An asura belonging to the line of Hiranyaksha and the daitya clan, Durgama performed a penance to propitiate Brahma, the creator deity. After many years, Brahma appeared to grant him a boon of his choice. Departing from his ancestors' conventional wish for immortality, Durgama wished to be the sole owner of the texts and the knowledge of the Vedas. After gaining this ownership, he locked them in Patala, the netherworld, making them inaccessible to priests and sages on earth, who needed them to perform yajnas. This led to the extinction of this practice, which in turn led to the devas losing their power. The worlds descended into famine and thirst. Durgama seized the opportunity to usurp the throne of Svarga from Indra, enslaving all the devas. Since Durgama's father had received a boon of protection for his entire family, the Trimurti were unable to intercede in this conflict. Hence, they summoned Jagadambika, the supreme goddess, to restore order. The goddess descended upon earth and shed tears of woe upon witnessing the state of humans, which led to the flow of rivers, and she also nourished the people with vegetables and herbs. Durgama attacked the goddess with his army. Dhāriṇī, Bālā, Tripurā, Bhairavī and Kālī emerged from Jagadambika's form, as manifestations of her shakti. After Durgama's army was obliterated, a single combat ensued between the king and the goddess. The asura king was slain by the arrows of the goddess. The Vedas were liberated, and order was restored.

== See also ==
- Sumbha and Nisumbha
- Hiranyaksha
- Mahishasura
