= Tukreswari Temple =

- টুক্ৰেশ্বৰী দেৱালয়
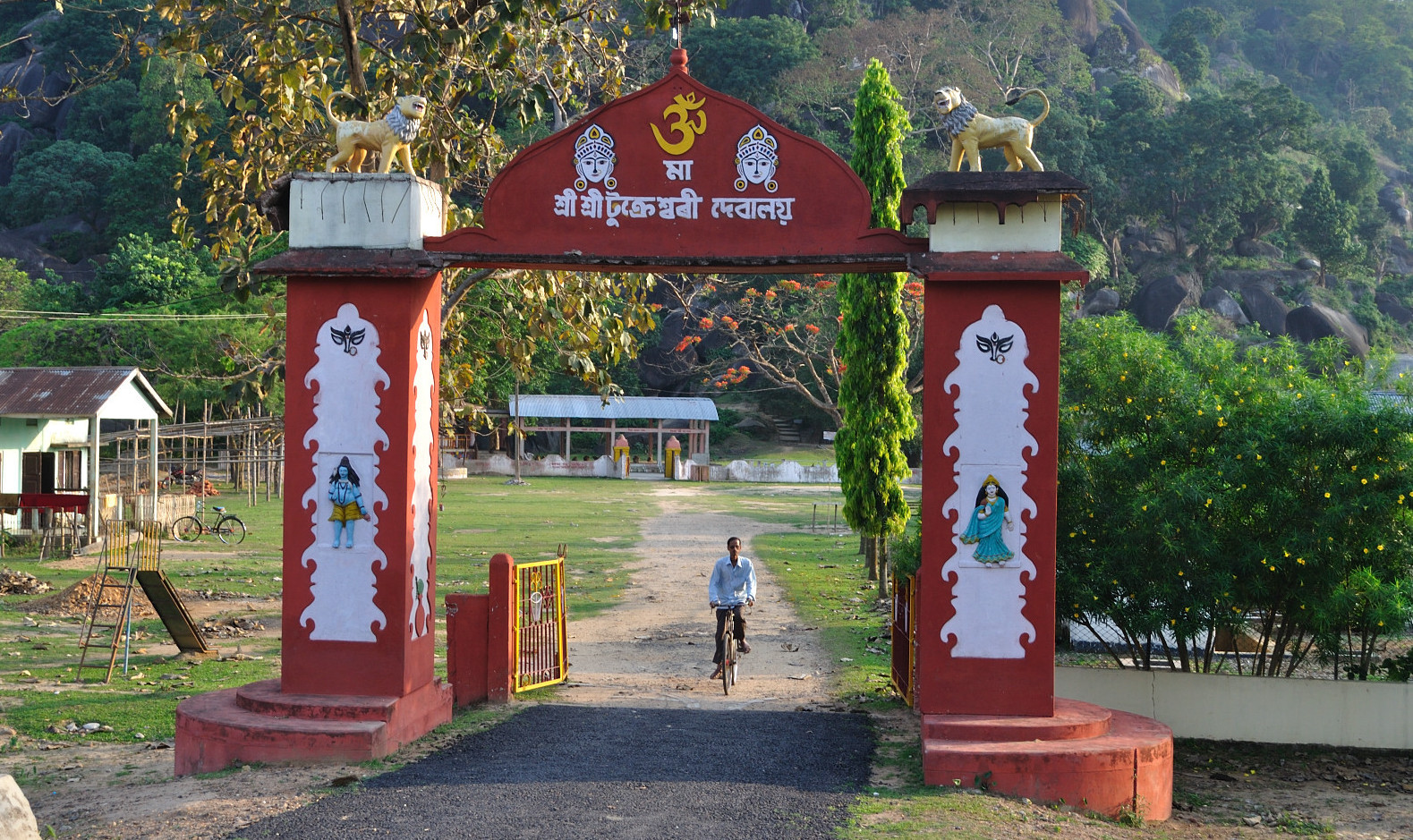
- Entry gate of Tukreswari Temple

- Location in Goalpara

Religion
- Affiliation: Hinduism
- District: Goalpara district
- Deity: Sati

Location
- Location: Goalpara district, Assam
- State: Assam
- Country: India
- Interactive map of Tukreswari Temple
- Coordinates: 26°02′58.4″N 90°37′55.9″E

Architecture
- Type: Hindu temple architecture
- Creator: Not specified. The temple's origins are linked to the mythological event of Goddess Sati's body part falling at this location during Shiva's tandava, making it a Shakta pitha.

Specifications
- Temple: 1 primary temple dedicated to Goddess Sati.
- Monuments: 2 (includes the main shrine for Sati and a secondary shrine dedicated to Lord Shiva).

Tukreswari Temple (also known as Tukreswari Devalaya) in Goalpara district, Assam is an ancient Hindu temple and is dedicated to Sati as Shakta pitha. Shakta pithas are shrines or divine places of Sati, believed to have enshrined with the presence of Shakti due to the falling of body parts of the corpse of Sati. It is believed that an enraged Shiva performed the Tandava dance with Sati's charred body, which led her body came apart and the pieces fell at different places on earth. As per religious faith a portion of Goddess Sati's body part fell in this place and therefore this temple is known as Tukreswari (Tukreswari is derived from the Assamese word Tukura which means fragment or piece).
