= Manibandh Shaktipeeth =

Shaktipeeth in Rajasthan

Religion
- Affiliation: Hinduism
- District: Ajmer
- Deity: Gaytri
- Festivals: Navaratri, Pushkar Fair

Location
- Location: Pushkar
- State: Rajasthan
- Country: India
- Interactive map of Manibandh Shaktipeeth
- Coordinates: 26.473558°N 74.551362°E

Website
- https://manibandh.com/

Manibandh Shaktipeeth, also known as Manivedika Shaktipeeth or Rajarajeshwari Puruhuta Manivedic Shaktipeeth, is one of the 51 sacred Shaktipeeths in Hinduism. It is located in Pushkar, Rajasthan, near Ajmer, India. The temple is believed to mark the site where the Goddess Sati's wrists (Manibandh) fell, as described in Hindu mythology. The temple is also known locally as the Chamunda Mata Mandir and holds significant religious importance.

== Location ==
Manibandh Shaktipeeth is situated at the base of Gayatri Mountain (Puruhuta Hill), approximately 11 km northwest of Ajmer and 5–7 km from the Brahma Temple in Pushkar. Modern roads have improved the accessibility of the temple, although it remained hidden for centuries due to the hill's remoteness. The site has gained greater recognition through recent infrastructure improvements, making it a growing pilgrimage destination. Public and private transport is available from Ajmer and Pushkar by road. The nearest railway station is Pushkar Station, which connects the temple to major cities. The closest airport is Jaipur International Airport, approximately 150 km from Pushkar.

== Religious significance ==
The formation of the Shaktipeeths is rooted in Hindu mythology, which narrates the story of Goddess Sati and Lord Shiva. According to Hindu mythology, Shaktipeeths are sites where body parts of Goddess Sati, the wife of Lord Shiva, are believed to have fallen after her body was divided by Lord Vishnu's Sudarshan Chakra. This act was performed to stop Lord Shiva's destructive Tandava, which he began out of grief after Sati immolated herself during a yagna organised by her father, King Daksha. After Sati's immolation, Shiva wandered across the universe carrying her body. To prevent the universe from being destroyed by his grief and anger, Lord Vishnu dismembered Sati's body, scattering her remains across the Indian subcontinent. Each site where a part of her body or one of her ornaments fell became a Shaktipeeth. At Manibandh Shaktipeeth, Sati's wrists are believed to have fallen, giving the site its name. As a result, the site is closely connected to themes of action and spirituality, with worship centred around Goddess Gayatri and Lord Shiva as Sarvanand Bhairava.

For centuries, the Manibandh Shaktipeeth remained a relatively unknown pilgrimage site due to its secluded location. Local traditions hold that the temple was discovered after devotees' prayers drew the goddess from the mountain. Despite its significance, the temple received fewer visitors until recent efforts improved road access and increased awareness. Since the early 21st century, infrastructure development and increased awareness have led to a steady increase in the number of pilgrims. Local priests and devotees have been instrumental in preserving and developing the temple.

=== Cultural and religious practices ===
The temple is a focal point of devotion for local communities and pilgrims alike. Daily prayers and rituals are performed, with increased activity during significant Hindu festivals. Major celebrations include Navaratri and Durga Puja, which attract pilgrims from across the region. The temple is also linked to the Pushkar Mela, a cultural and spiritual fair held annually on the banks of Pushkar Lake during the month of Kartik (October–November).

=== Festivals and celebrations ===
The temple sees large gatherings of worshippers during Sharadiya Navratri (September–October) and Chaitra Navratri (March–April). Rituals performed during these festivals involve special prayers, offerings, and community participation. In addition to these festivals, the annual Pushkar Fair, or Pushkar Mela, is a major event in the area, featuring camel races, cultural exhibitions, and spiritual gatherings that draw visitors from across India and abroad.

== Bibliography ==
Sharma, Madan Lal (2022). 108 सिद्ध शक्तिपीठ एवं राजस्थान में अवस्थित सिद्ध शक्तिपीठ. Jodhpur: JCB Publishing House. ISBN 9788192990088.
