= Sugandha Shakta pitha =

Hindu temple in Bangladesh

- সুগন্ধা শক্তিপীঠ
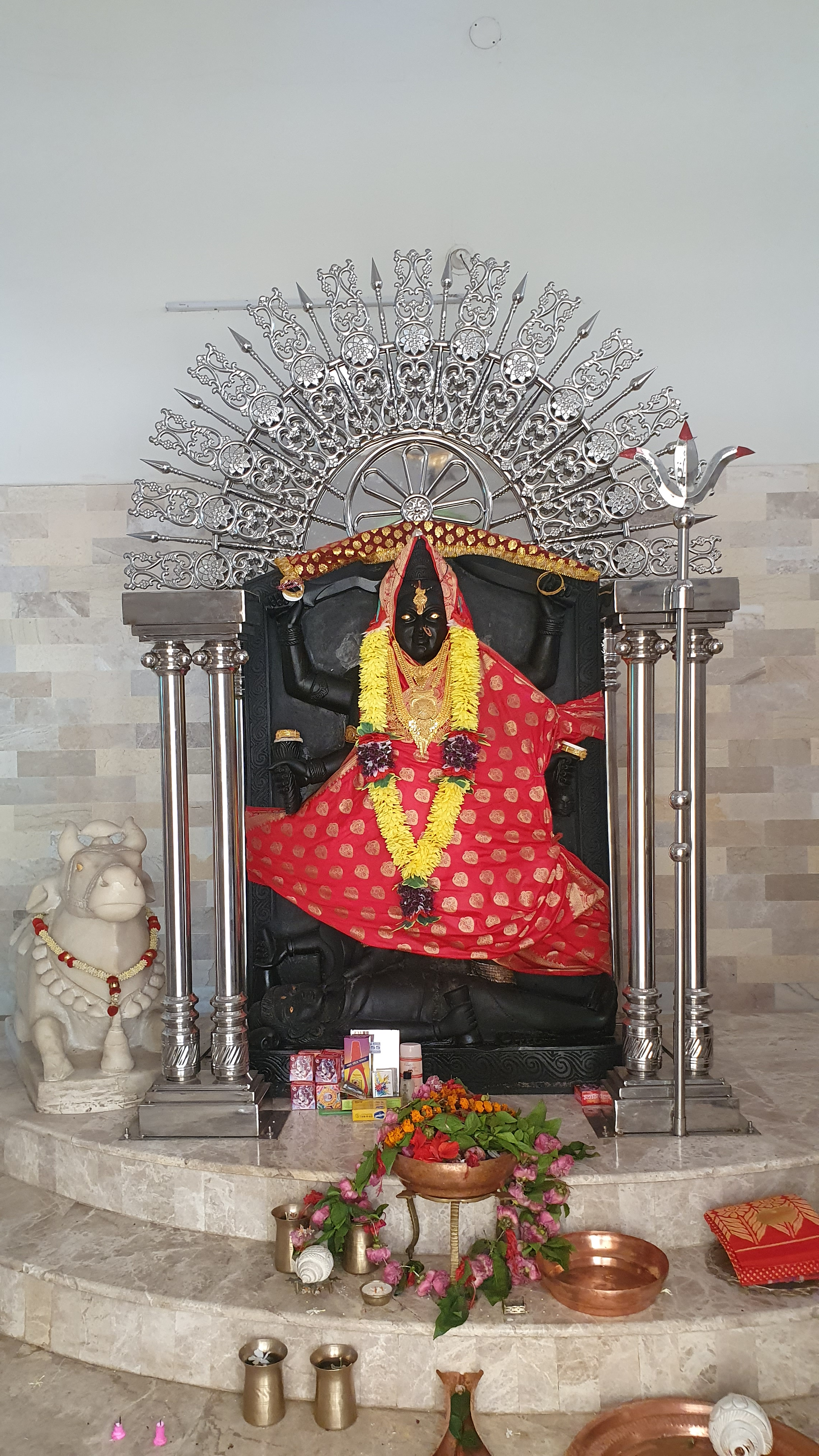
- Goddess of Shugandha Shakta pitha Temple

- Location within Bangladesh

Religion
- Affiliation: Hinduism
- Festival: Shiva-Chaturdashi

Location
- Location: Shikarpur, Barisal
- Country: Bangladesh
- Interactive map of Sugandha Shakta pitha
- Coordinates: 22°50′36.3″N 90°15′33.4″E

Sugandha Shakta pitha (Bengali: সুগন্ধা শক্তিপীঠ), a temple of the Goddess Sunanda, is located in the village of Shikarpur, 10 miles north of Barisal, in Bangladesh. This Hindu temple is one of the Shakta pithas.

== The Temple as a Shakta pitha ==
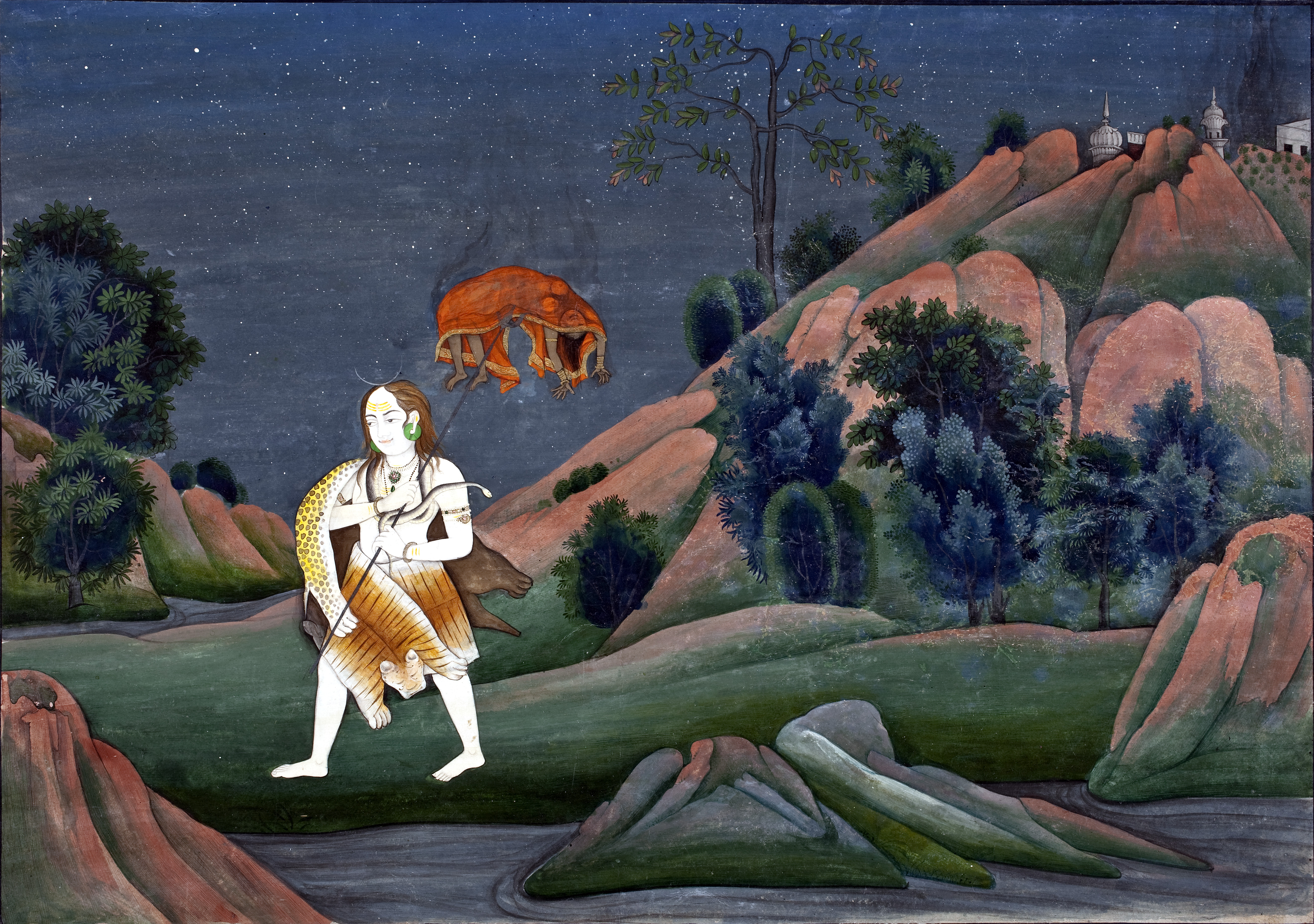
Shiva carrying the corpse of Sati Devi

The mythology of Daksha Yaga and Sati's self-immolation had immense significance in shaping the ancient Sanskrit literature and even had an impact on the culture of India. It led to the development of the concept of Shakta pithas and there by strengthening Shaktism. Enormous mythological stories in the Puranas took the Daksha Yaga as the reason for their origin. It is an important incident in Shaivism resulting in the emergence of Shree Parvati in the place of Sati Devi and making Shiva a grihastashrami (householder), leading to the origin of Ganapathy and Subrahmanya.

Shakta pithas are shrines or divine places of the Mother Goddess. These are places that are believed to have been enshrined with the presence of Shakti due to the falling of body parts of the corpse of Sati Devi when Lord Shiva carried it and wandered throughout Aryavartha in sorrow. There are 51 Shakta pithas linking to the 51 alphabets in Sanskrit. Each temple has shrines for Shakti and Kalabhairava and mostly each temple associates different names with Shakti and Kalabhairava in that temple.

== Legend ==
Sati was the first wife of Shiva as the first incarnation of Parvati. She was the daughter of King Daksha and Queen (the daughter of Brahma). She committed self-immolation at the sacrificial fire of a yagna performed by her father, Daksha, as she felt seriously distraught by her father's insult of her husband and also to her by not inviting both of them for the yagna. Shiva was so grieved after hearing of the death of his wife that he danced around the world in a Tandav Nritya ("devastating penance" or dance of destruction), carrying Sati's dead body over his shoulders. Perturbed by this situation and in order to bring Shiv to a state of normalcy, it was then Vishnu who decided to use his Sudarshan Chakra (the rotating knife carried on his fingertip). He dismembered Sati's body with the chakra into several pieces, and wherever her body fell on the earth, the place was consecrated as a divine shrine, or Shakta pitha, with deities of Sati (Parvati) and Shiva. At temple Sugandha, Goddess Sati's Nose had fallen. Sugandha is also a Hindi/Sanskrit name as a reference to the nose. Such places have become famous pilgrimage places as pithas or Shakta pithas and are found scattered all over the subcontinent, including Pakistan, Bangladesh, Sri Lanka, and Nepal, apart from India. Sati is also known as Devi or Shakti, and with the blessings of Vishnu, she was reborn as the daughter of Himavat or the Himalayas, and hence named Parvati (daughter of mountains). She was born on the 14th day of the bright half of the month of Mrigashīrsha, which marks the Shivarathri (Shiva's night) festival.
