= Attahas, Katwa =

Shakta pitha in West Bengal

Attahas Temple
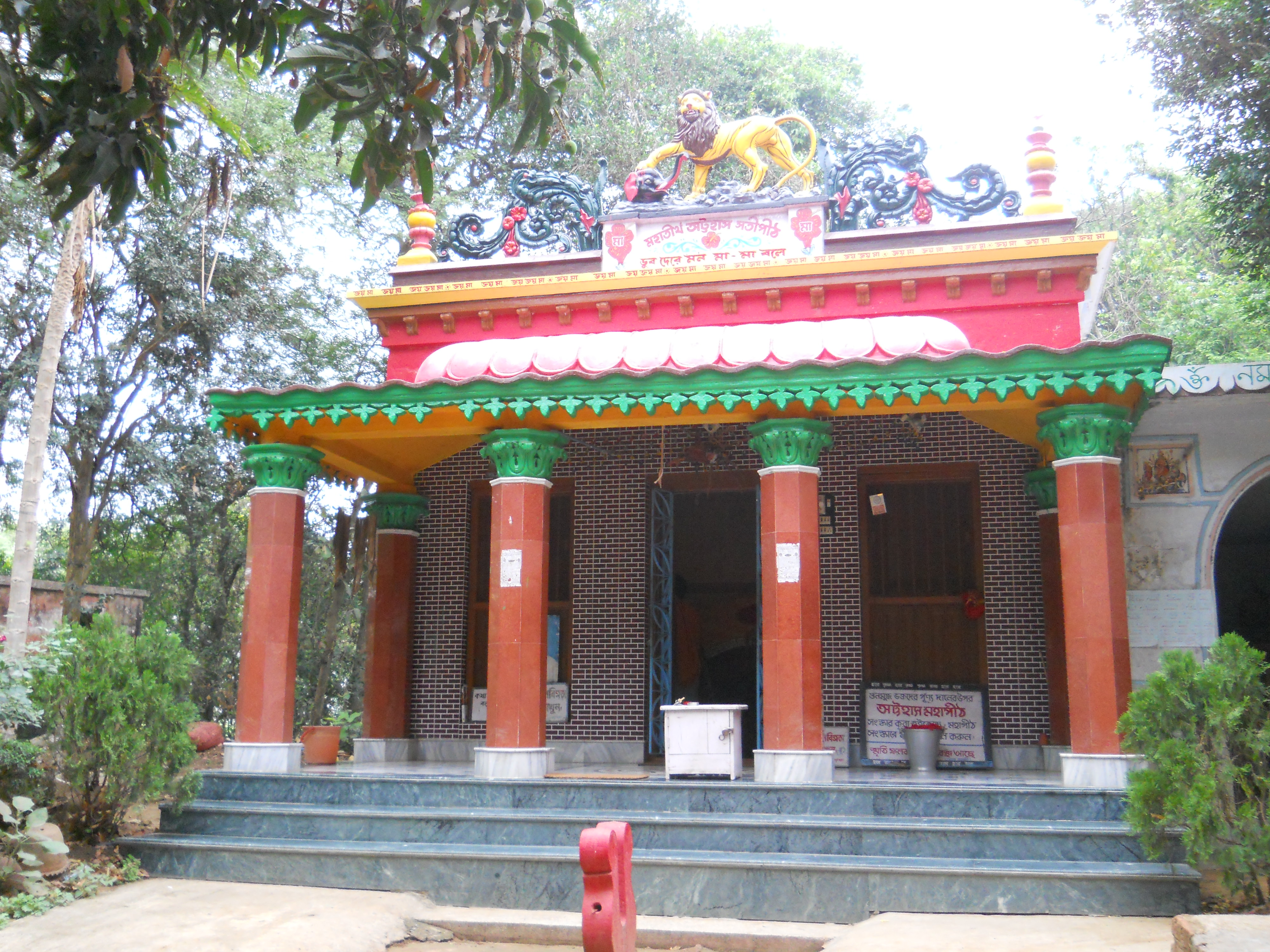
- Attahas temple

- Location in West Bengal Attahas, Katwa (India)

Religion
- Affiliation: Hinduism
- District: Birbhum
- Deity: Sati

Location
- Location: Dakhsindihi, Ketugram II CD block
- State: West Bengal
- Country: India
- Coordinates: 23.693508°N 88.022303°E

Attahas is a temple in Labhpur in Birbhum district, West Bengal, India. It is one of the 51 Shakta pithas at which it is believed the body parts and jewelry of the Hindu goddess Shakti fell to Earth.
