= Batuka =

Batuka may refer to:

== Music ==
- "Batuka", by American rock band Santana from Santana (1971 album)
- "Batuka", Zumba type workout by Kike Santander
- "Batuka", song by Madonna from Madame X (album)
- Batuque (music and dance), credited by Madonna in her 2019 "Batuka" song

== See also ==
- Batuka Bhairava group of gods who are worshipped before the commencement of the worship of Lord Shiva.
