= Kankalitala =

- Temple town/ village
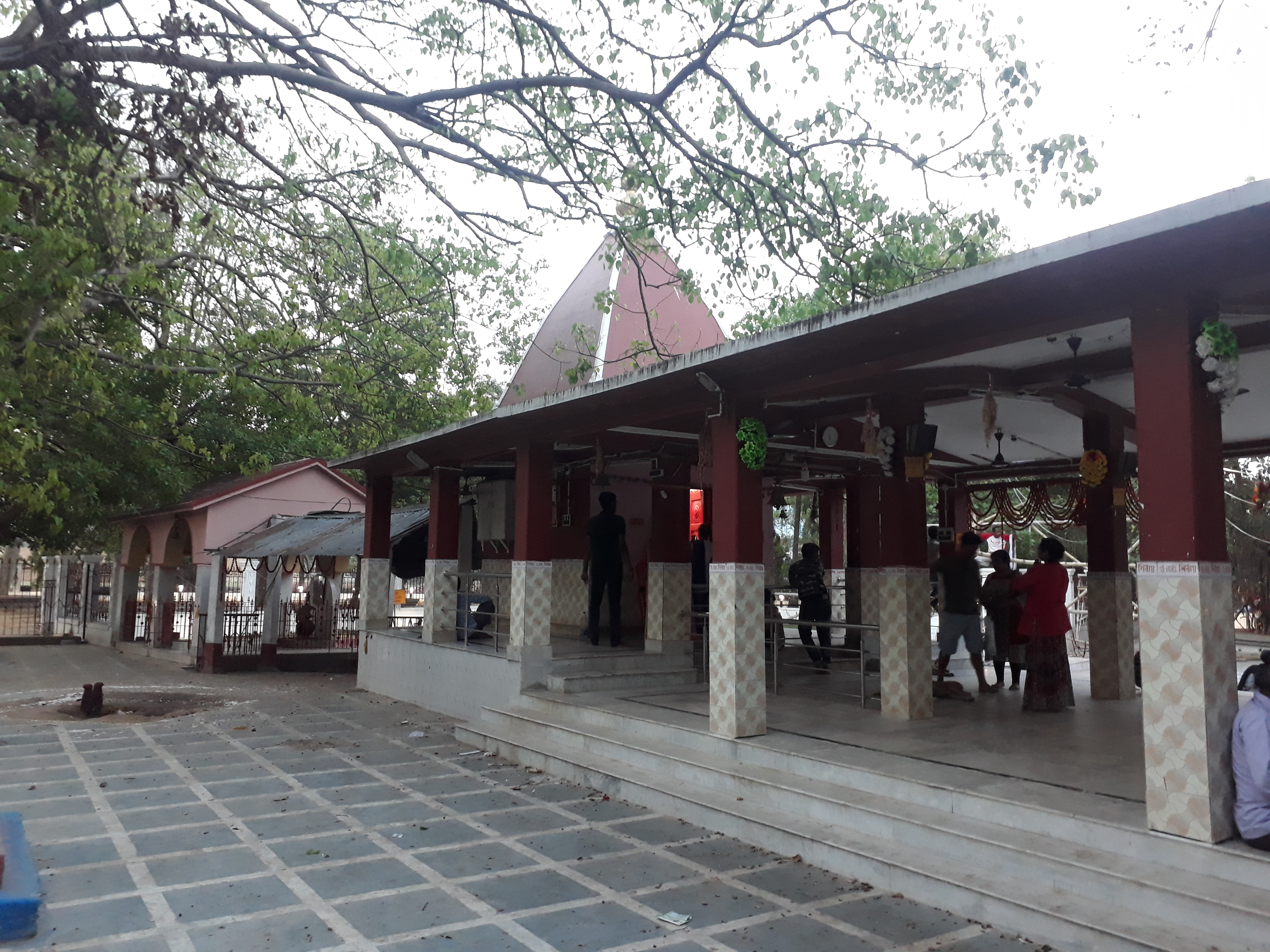
- Kankalitala Temple

- Location in West Bengal, India
- Coordinates: 23.714688°N 87.722815°E
- Country: India
- State: West Bengal
- District: Birbhum

Languages
  - Official: Bengali, English
- Time zone: UTC+5:30 (IST)
- ISO 3166 code: IN-WB
- Lok Sabha constituency: Bolpur
- Vidhan Sabha constituency: Nanoor
- Website: birbhum.gov.in

Kankalitala is a temple town in Bolpur Sriniketan CD block in Bolpur subdivision of Birbhum district in the Indian state of West Bengal.

== Geography ==
Cities and towns in Bolpur subdivision of Birbhum district
M: municipal city/ town, CT: census town, R: rural/ urban centre, U: University.
Owing to space constraints in the small map, the actual locations in a larger map may vary slightly

=== Location ===
It is located about 9 kilometres (5.6 mi) from Bolpur on the Bolpur–Labhpur road. It is situated on the bank of the Kopai River.

Note: The map alongside presents some of the notable locations in the area. All places marked in the map are linked in the larger full screen map.

Earlier, Kankalitala was marked as a gram panchayat under Bolpur-Sriniketan block. However, in the 2011 census, it was not identified as a separate place, as per Google map and map of Bolpur-Sriniketan on page 718 of District Census Handbook Birbhum (Part A), it appears to be a part of Bengutia village.

== Politics ==
As per orders of the Delimitation Commission, Kankalitala, Kasba, Sarpalehana Albandha, Sian Muluk and Singhee gram panchayats of Bolpur–Sriniketan CD Block will form part of Nanoor (Vidhan Sabha constituency) and Bolpur (Lok Sabha constituency).

== Culture ==
It is one of the Shakta pithas where the waist (or kankal in Bengali) of sati fell. There are several temples in the town. This is also a popular Hindu pilgrimage site of West Bengal. There is another temple in Kankalitala, Kanchishwar Temple in the Kankalitala Temple complex.

== The Kankalitala Temple as a Shakta pitha ==
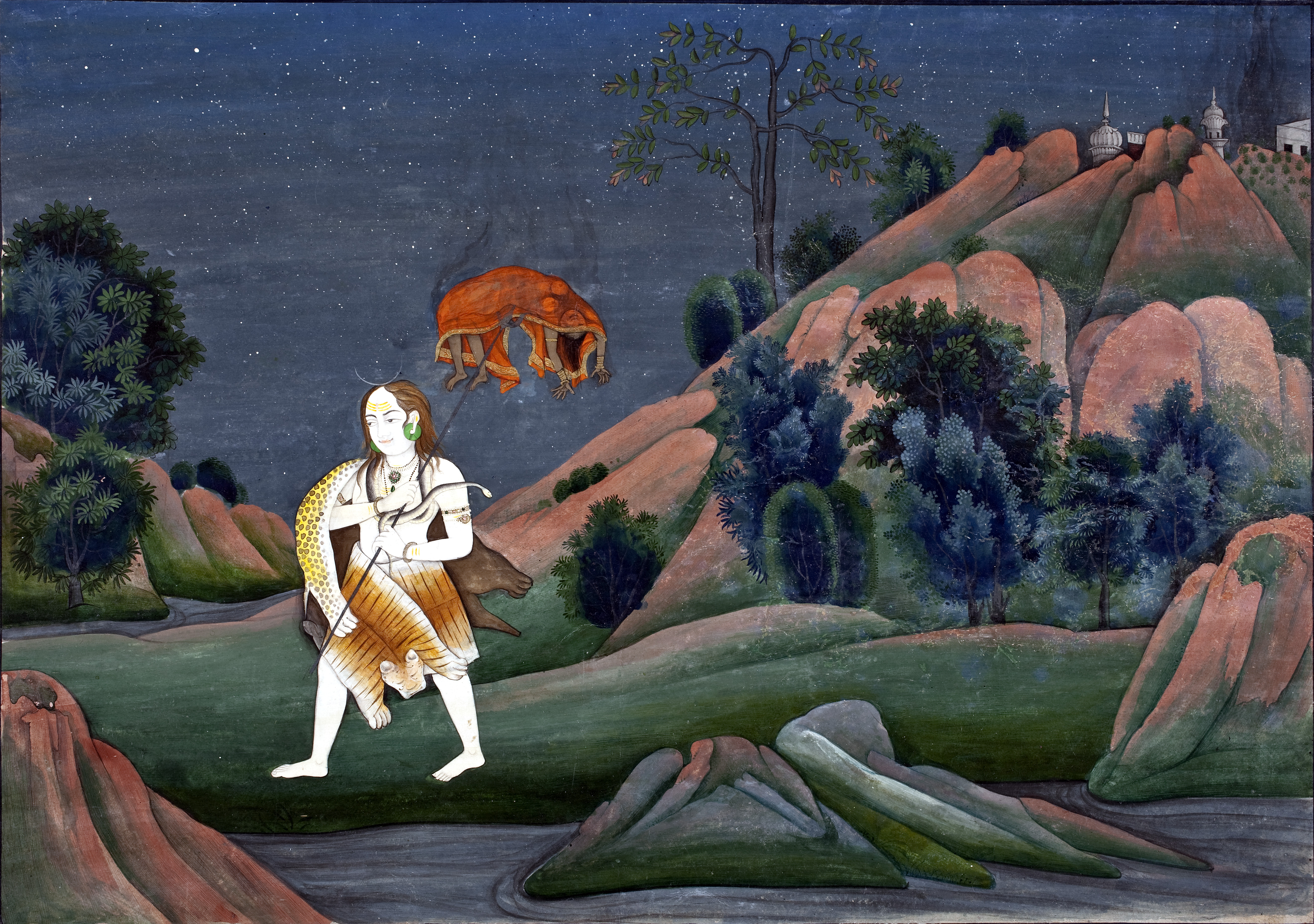
Shiva carrying the corpse of Sati Devi

The mythology of Daksha yaga and Sati's self immolation is the story of origin behind Shakta pithas. Shakta pithas are holy abodes of Devi formed due to the falling of body parts of the corpse of Sati Devi, when Shiva carried it and wandered through. There are 51 Shakta pithas linking to the 51 alphabets in Sanskrit. Each temple has shrines for Shakti and Kalabhairava. The Shakti of the temple is addressed as "Devgarbha" and the Bhairava as "Ruru". It is believed that Sati Devi's bones have fallen here.
