= Shri Shail =

Shakti pitha in Sylhet, Bangladesh

Coordinates: 24.8650°N 91.8756°E

Shri Shri Mahalakshmi Bhairabi Griba Maha Peetha is one of the Shakta pithas, at Joinpur village, Dakshin Surma, near Gotatikar, 3 km south-east of Sylhet town, Bangladesh. The Hindu Goddess Sati's neck fell here. The Goddess is worshipped as Mahalakshmi and the Bhairav form is Sambaranand.

== Legend ==
Sati, was the first wife of Shiva as the first incarnation of Parvati. She was the daughter of King Daksha and Queen (the daughter of Brahma). She committed self-immolation at the sacrificial fire of a yagna performed by her father Daksha as she felt seriously distraught by her father's insult of her husband and also to her by not inviting both of them for the yagna. Shiva was so grieved after hearing of the death of his wife that he danced around the world in a Tandav Nritya ("devastating penance" or dance of destruction) carrying Sati's dead body over his shoulders. Perturbed by this situation and in order to bring Shiv to a state of normalcy, it was then Vishnu who decided to use his Sudarshan Chakra (the rotating knife s carried on his finger tip). He dismembered Sati's body with the chakra into several pieces and wherever her body fell on the earth, the place was consecrated as a divine shrine oo Shakthi Peeth with deities of Sati (Parvati) and Shiva. These locations have become famous pilgrimage places as Pithas or Shakthi Pithas, and are found scattered all over the subcontinent including Pakistan, Bangladesh, Sri Lanka and Nepal, apart from India. Sati is also known as Devi or Shakthi, and with blessings of Vishnu she was reborn as the daughter of Himavat or Himalayas and hence named as Parvati (daughter of mountains). She was born on the 14th day of the bright half of the month of Mrigashīrsha, which marks the Shivarathri (Shiva's night) festival.

== The Mahalakshmi temple as a Shakta pitha - Daksha Yaga and Sati's self-immolation ==
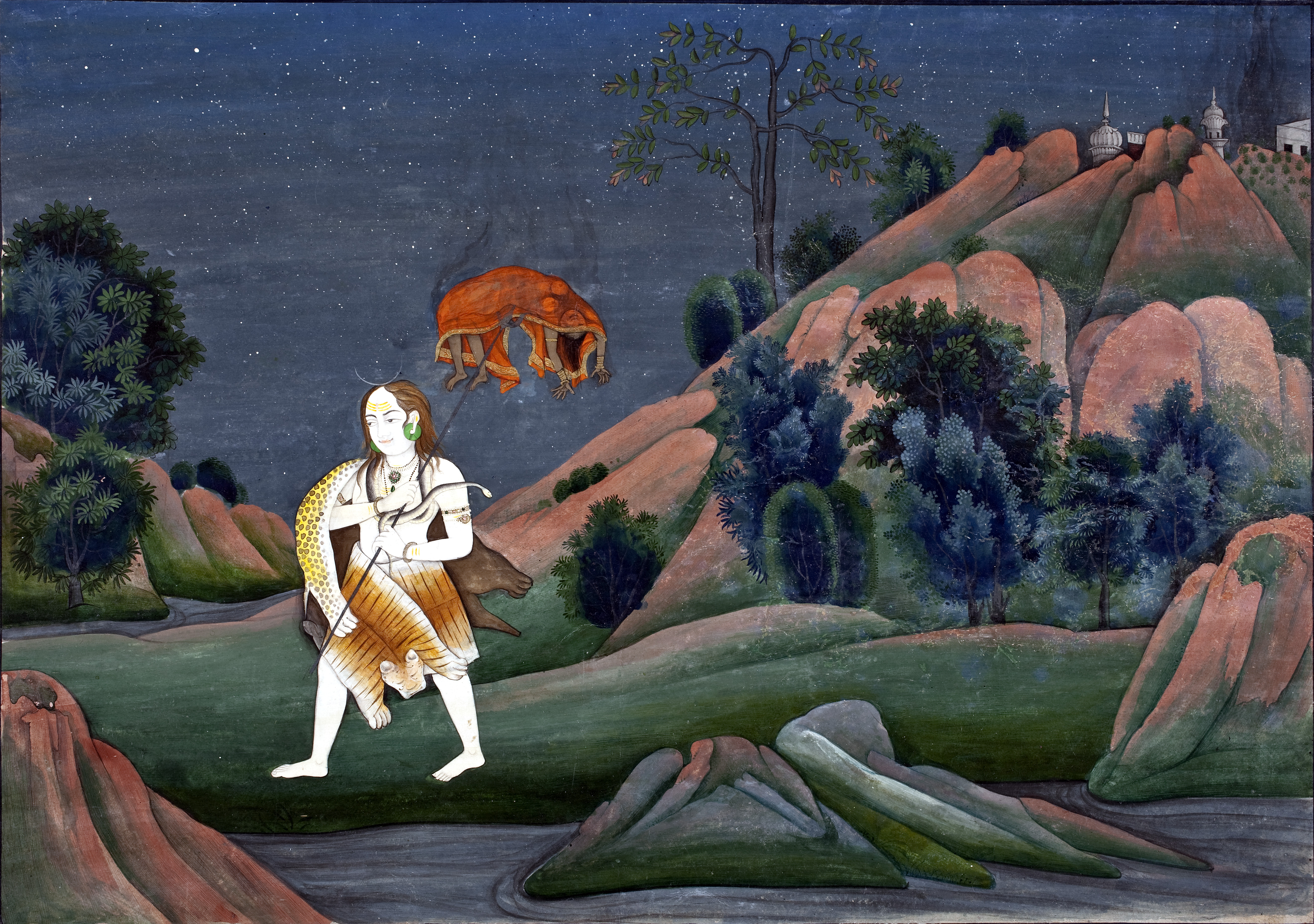
Shiva carrying the corpse of Sati Devi

The aforesaid mythology of Daksha yaga and Sati's self immolation is the mythology of origin behind the Shakta pithas.

Shakta pithas are believed to have enshrined with the presence of Shakti due to the falling of body parts of the corpse of Sati Devi, when Lord Shiva carried it and wandered throughout the land in sorrow. There are 51 Shakta pithas linking to the 51 alphabets in Sanskrit. Each temple have shrines for Shakti and Kalabhairava.
It is believed that the Neck of Sati Devi has fallen in Srihatta and the Shakti here is addressed as Mahalakshmi and the Kalabhairava as Sambaranand.
