= Mahabhagavata Purana =

Hindu goddess-centric text

The Mahabhagavata Purana (Sanskrit: महाभागवतपुराणम्, romanized: mahābhāgavatapurāṇam), also called the Devi Purana, is an upapurana (minor Purana) traditionally attributed to the sage Vyasa. Written between the tenth and eleventh centuries CE in Bengal, the work belongs to the Shakta tradition. It primarily describes the legends of the supreme goddess of Hinduism, Mahadevi, and her manifestation as the goddesses Sati, Parvati, Kali, and Ganga. The work is regarded to have been strongly influenced by the Tantra tradition, including descriptions of the Tantric forms of goddess-worship such as the mahavidyas, and integrating them with the Vedanta school of thought.

== Contents ==
The Mahabhagavata Purana begins with the manifestation of Mahadevi as Sati, her marriage to Shiva, and her conflict with her father, Daksha. The second narrative, called the Ganga Upakhyana, describes the manifestation of the goddess as Ganga. The third narrative, called the Shiva Upakhyana, relays the manifestation of the goddess as Parvati, as well as including the Bhagavati Gita, a dialogue between Parvati and her father Himavan on the significance of bhakti, as well as the thousand names of the goddess, termed the Mahakalisahasranamastotra. The latter half of the text comprise the Shakta version of the Ramayana, the legend of Krishna, where he is depicted as an embodiment of Mahadevi, and the defeat of Vritra at the hands of Indra. It describes the Shakti Pithas as the sites where a grieving Shiva meditated after the death of Sati at the Daksha Yajna, the deity proclaiming blessings upon the devotees who worshipped at them. Kamarupa is described to be the greatest of the Shakti Pithas, offering moksha (liberation) to all adherents who worship at the site.

== Translations and Commentaries ==
- Devi Mahabhagavata Purana (Sanskrit Text with English Translation) - Shanti Lal Nagar
- A Critical Study of The Mahabhagavadpuranam - Hansa B. Bhatt
