= Kukkuteswara Temple =

Hindu temple

- Kukkuṭēśvara Dēvālayaṁ
- Location in Andhra Pradesh

Religion
- Affiliation: Hinduism
- District: Kakinada
- Deity: Kukkuteswara (Shiva); Rajarajeswari Devi; Puruhutika Devi
- Festivals: Maha Shivaratri, Navaratri

Location
- Location: Pithapuram
- State: Andhra Pradesh
- Country: India
- Coordinates: 17°06′24.46″N 82°14′36″E

The Kukkuteswara Temple or Sri Kukkuteswara Swami Temple is a Hindu temple in Pitapuram town of Kakinada district, Andhra Pradesh, India. The temple is prominent in both Saivite and Shakta Hindu traditions. It is one of the eighteen Maha Shakta pithas considered the most significant pilgrimage destinations in Shaktism. The presiding deity of the temple is Lord Kukkuteswara, a form of Lord Siva as a rooster and his consort Rajarajeswari Devi.

The temple of Puruhutika Devi, one of the Maha Shakta pithas is on the premises of Kukkuteswara Temple. Pithapuram is referred to in the Skanda Purana and in Srinatha's Bheemeswara Puranamu (c. 15th century) and also in Samudragupta's Prayaga stone pillar inscription (c. 350 CE).

== Location ==
It is located at a distance of 16 km (9.9 mi) from Kakinada, 45 km (28 mi) from Tuni, 65 km (40 mi) from Rajahmundry and 138 km (86 mi) from Visakhapatnam.

== Temple ==
Kukuteswara Swamy is a Swayambhu with Spatika Lingam. The temple is also famous for its single-stone Nandi (Eka Sila Nandi in Telugu).

== Festivals ==
Maha Sivaratri, Navaratri, and Karthika Masam are the main festivals celebrated at the temple. An annual festival is celebrated at the temple for Kukkuteswara called Maghabahula Ekadasi.
