= Shakta pithas =

Shrines in Shaktism, goddess-focused Hinduism

The Shakta pithas, also called Shakti pithas or Sati pithas (Sanskrit: शाक्त पीठ, Śakti Pīṭha, seats of Devi Sati), are significant shrines and pilgrimage destinations in Shaktism, the mother goddess denomination in Hinduism. The shrines are dedicated to various forms of Adi Shakti. (Note: Also known as Durga) Various Puranas such as Srimad Devi Bhagavatam state the existence of a varying number of 51, 52, 64 and 108 Shakta pithas of which 18 are named as Astadasha Maha (major) and 4 are named as Chatasrah Aadi (Sanskrit: चतस्रः आदि, first four) in medieval Hindu texts.

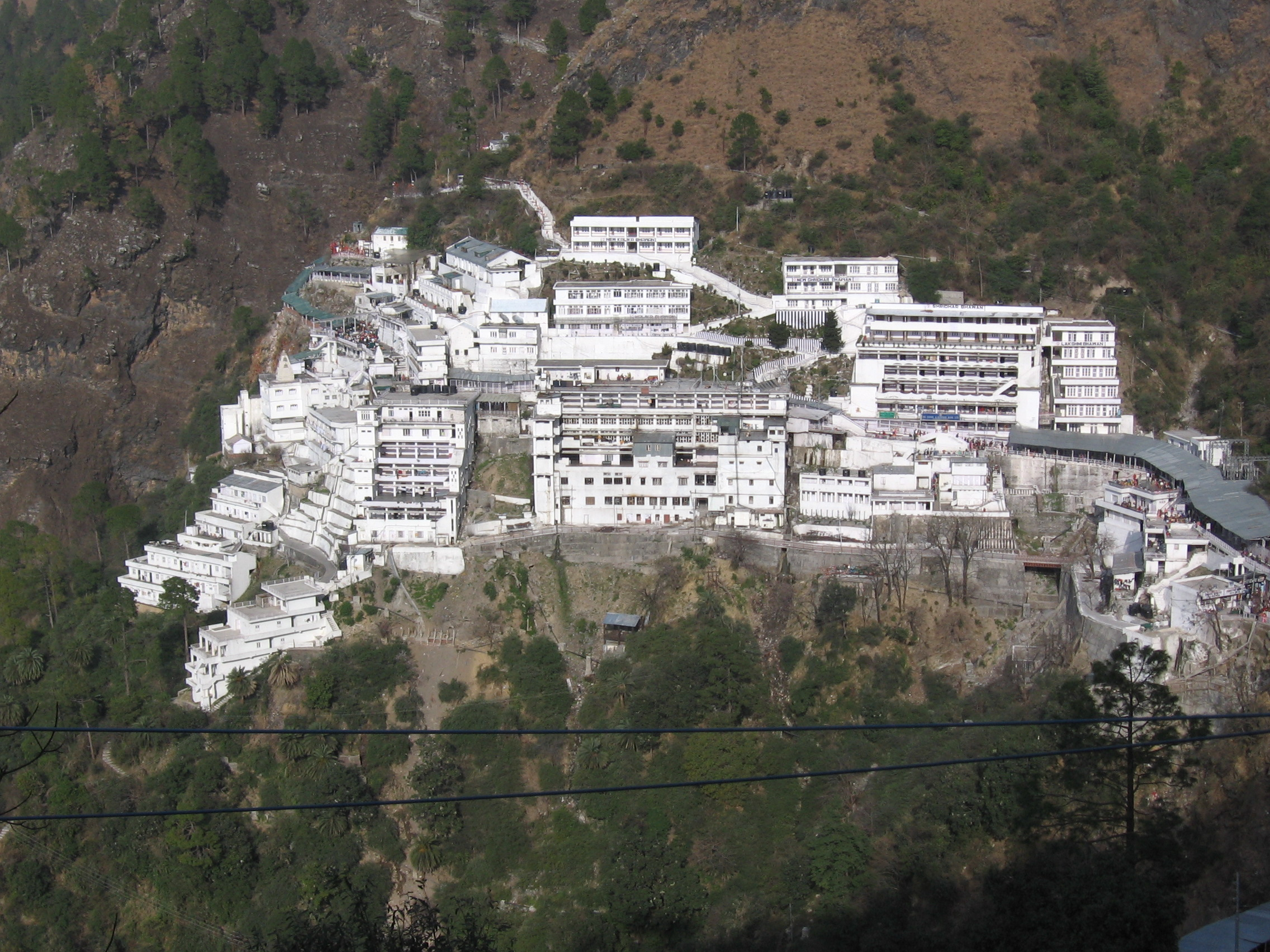
Shri Mata Vaishno Devi Temple is one of the 64 and 108 Maha (Major) Shakta pithas and is also the most visited among all. It attracts more than 15 million people annually.

Legends abound about how the Shakta pithas came into existence. The most popular is based on the story of the death of Sati, a deity according to Hinduism. Shiva carried Sati's body, reminiscing about their moments as a couple, and roamed around the universe with it. Vishnu cut her body into 108 body parts, using his Sudarshana Chakra, which fell on earth to become sacred sites where all the people can pay homage to the goddess. To complete this task, Shiva took the form of Bhairava.

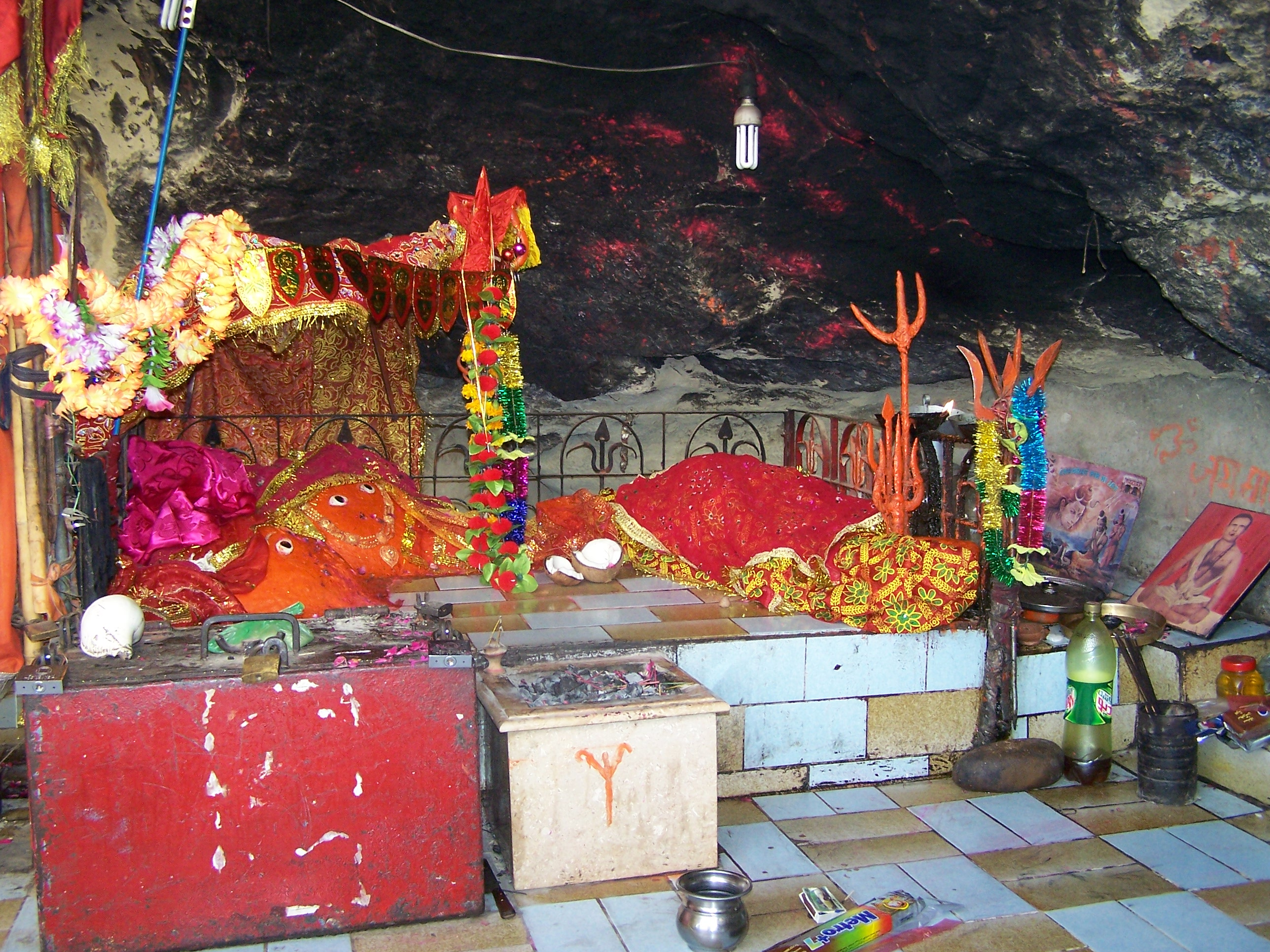
Shri Hinglaj Mata temple Shakta pitha is the largest Hindu pilgrimage centre in Pakistan. The annual Hinglaj Yatra is attended by more than 250,000 people.

Most of these historic places of goddess worship are in India, but there are some in Nepal, seven in Bangladesh, two in Pakistan, and one each in Tibet, Sri Lanka and Bhutan.

== Hinduism ==
=== Hindu literature ===
The Brahmanda Purana, one of the major eighteen Puranas mentions 64 Shakta pithas of the goddess Parvati. The Kalika Purana gives a list of seven pithas. A later Tantric text, the Kularṇava Tantra, lists the 18 pithas, and the Kubjika Tantra lists 42 pithas. The Pithanirnaya, also called the Mahapithanirupana describes 51 pithas, each associated with a form of the Goddess and a corresponding Bhairava. Sicar notes that a tradition of 52 pithas existed in parts of Bengal due to confusion in the transmission of pitha lists. The growth of the list has been linked to the expansion of Sakta sacred geography in early medieval period.

=== Daksha yajna ===
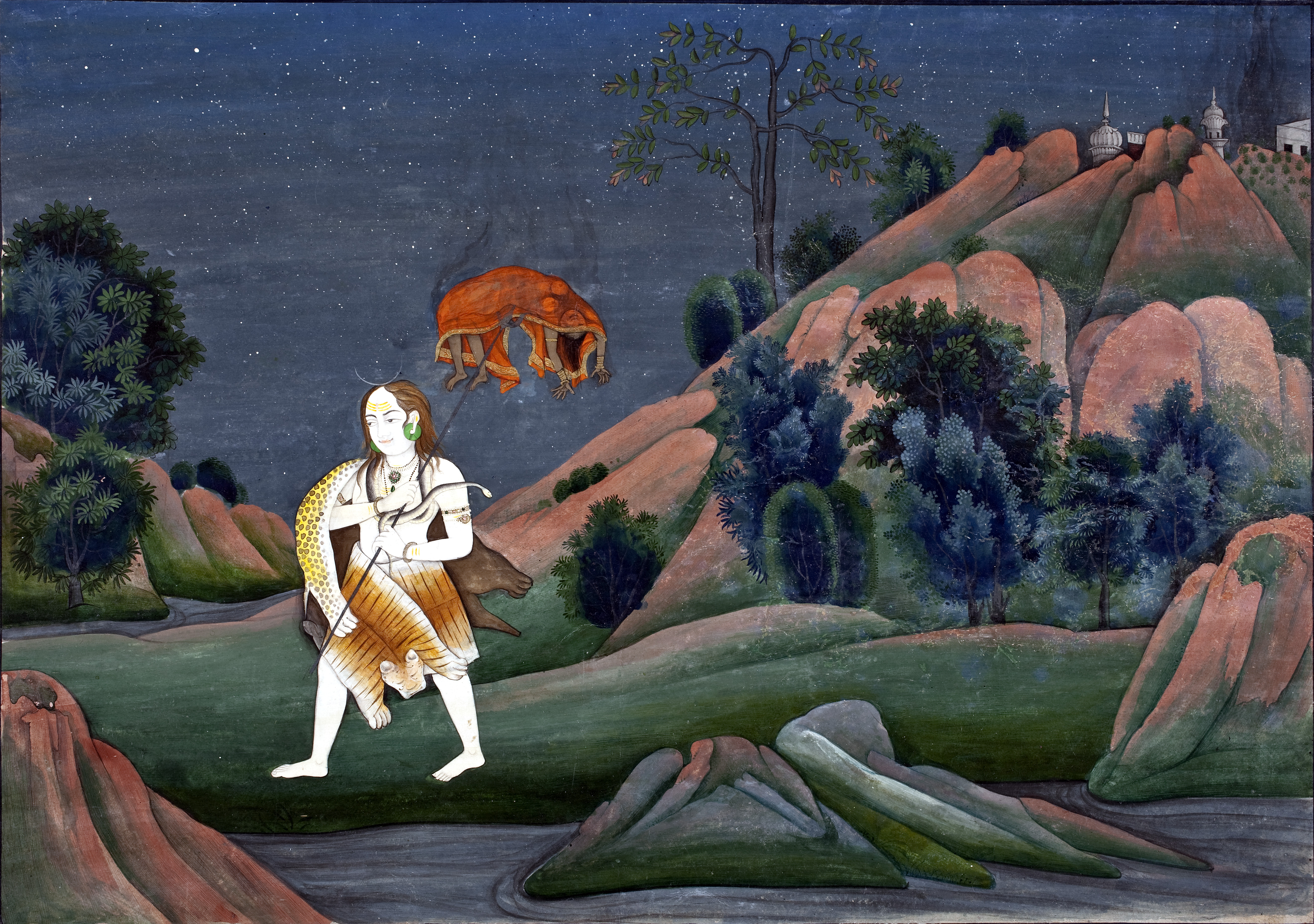
Shiva carrying the corpse of Dakshayani

Prajapati Daksha organized a yajna but did not invite his daughter, Sati, or her husband, Shiva.Dakṣa said that Shiva is a kapālin, the king of goblins, and an inauspicious entity unworthy of receiving sacrificial shares. Despite Shiva's warnings that attending uninvited would lead to severe insult, Satī proceeded to her father's sacrificial enclosure. Upon arrival, Sati was subjected to further insults from Daksha regarding her husband. Unable to tolerate the disrespect, she resolved to abandon her physical body. Scriptural accounts vary on her method of death: some texts state she threw herself into the sacrificial fire, while others describe her using yogic concentration to release her life force. The Mahabhagavata Purana provides a specific variation, stating that Sati created a shadow-form to enter the flames and disrupt the ritual.

Upon learning of Sati's death, an enraged Shiva created Virabhadra, who was accompanied by Bhadrakali and Pramathas. Under Shiva's orders, Virabhadra destroyed the sacrificial grounds and decapitated Daksha. Later, after being pacified by Brahma and the other deities, Shiva revived Daksha by replacing his severed head with that of a goat.

Overwhelmed by grief, Lord Shiva placed the burnt corpse of Satī upon his shoulder and wandered through the cosmos. As he traversed the earth, the limbs and ornaments of the Goddess's body fell in various locations, transforming those sites into sacred Siddhapīṭhas or Śakti Pīṭhas. While the Mahabhagavata Purana enumerates 51 such sites, highlighting Kamakhya in Kamarupa as the prominent location where her yoni fell other scriptures, such as the Devi Bhagavata Purana, list 108 sacred Pithas.

== Shakti pithas ==
Each temple has shrines for Shakti and Kalabhairava, and most Shakti and Kalabhairava in different Shakta pithas have different names.

=== Map of India's Shakti pithas ===
Shakti names at locations of Shakta pithas
Blue: Adi Shakta pithas; Red: Ashtadasha Maha Shakta pithas; Yellow: Daksha yagna site; Green: Maha Shakta pithas

=== List of 4 Adi Shakta Pithas ===
The scriptures, which include the Devi Bhagvatam Purana and Kalika Purana, recognize four Shakta pithas as sites where most of the energy is. The first pitha is Kamakhya (Assam, Yoni Khaṇḍa - genitals), Vimala (Puri, Pada Khaṇḍa - feet/lower limbs), Kalighat (West Bengal, Dakṣiṇa Padāṅguli - toes of right foot) and Tara Tarini (Berhampur, Stana Khaṇḍa - breasts).

Apart from these 4 there are 48 other famous pithas recognized by religious texts. According to the Pithanirnaya Tantra the 51 pithas are in the present day countries of India, Sri Lanka, Bangladesh, Nepal, Tibet, Bhutan and Pakistan. The Shivacharita besides listing 51 maha-pithas, speaks about 26 more upa-pithas. The Bengali almanac, Vishuddha Siddhanta Panjika too describes the 51 pithas including the present modified addresses. A few of the several accepted listings are given below. (Note: In South India, Srisailam in Andhra Pradesh became the site for a 2nd-century temple.)

Sr. No.	Temple	Place	State in India/Country	Part of the body fallen	Shakti
1	Vimala Temple(Inside Jagannath Temple)	Puri	Odisha	Feet	Goddess Vimala Devi
2	Kamakhya	Guwahati	Assam	Genitals	Goddess Kamakhya
3	Kalighat Temple	Kolkata	West Bengal	Toes	Goddess kali
4	Tara Tarini Temple	Brahmapur	Odisha	Breast	Goddess Tara Tarini

=== List of 18 Maha Shakta pithas ===
There are believed to be 64 locations. Adi Shankara's Ashtadasha Shakta pitha stotram mentions 18 locations known as the Maha Shakta pithas. Among these, the Shakta pithas at Guwahati, Gaya and Ujjain are regarded as the most sacred as they symbolize the three most important duties of the Mother Goddess viz. Creation (Kamakhya Devi), Nourishment (Sarvamangala Devi), and Annihilation (Mahakali Devi).

Sr. No.	Temple	Place	State in India/Country	Appellation	Part of the body fallen	Shakti	Image
1	Historically unknown Recent claims : Koneswaram Temple (no Devi shrine)	Lanka; Historically undetermined Recent claims : Trincomalee (Thirukonamalai)	Sri Lanka	Shankari Pitham	Groin	Goddess Shankari	
2	Kamakshi Amman Temple	Kanchipuram	Tamil Nadu	Kamakoti Pitham	Part of Abdomen	Goddess Kamakshi	
3	Shrinkala Temple	Pradmunyee(Pandua)	West Bengal	Bhavatārini Pitham	Part of stomach	Goddess Shrinkhala	
4	Chamundeshwari Temple	Mysuru	Karnataka	Krouncha Pitham	Hair	Goddess Chamundeshwari	
5	Jogulamba Devi	Alampuram	Telangana	Yogini Pitham	Teeth	Goddess Jogulamba (Yogamba Thalli)	
6	Bhramaramba Mallikarjuna Temple	Srisailam	Andhra Pradesh	Srisaila Pitham	Neck	Goddess Bhramarambika	
7	Mahalakshmi Temple	Kolhapur	Maharashtra	Shri Pitham	eye	Goddess Mahalakshmi (Aai Ambabai Devi)	
8	Renuka	Mahur	Maharashtra	Moola Pitham	Left hand	Goddess Renuka	
9	Mahakaleswar Temple	Ujjain	Madhya Pradesh	Ujjaini Pitham	Upper lip	Goddess Mahakali	
10	Kukkuteswara Swamy Temple	Pithapuram	Andhra Pradesh	Pushkarini Pitham	Back	Goddess Puruhutika	
11	Biraja Temple	Jajpur	Odisha	Oddyana Pitham	Navel	Goddess Biraja	
12	Bhimeshvara Temple	Draksharamam	Andhra Pradesh	Daksharama Pitham	Left cheek	Goddess Manikyamba	
13	Kamakhya Temple	Guwahati	Assam	Kamarupa Pitham	Genitals	Goddess Kamakhya	
14	Alopi Devi Mandir	Prayagraj	Uttar Pradesh	Prayaga Pitham	Fingers	Goddess Madhaveshwari	
15	Jwalamukhi Temple	Jwalamukhi	Himachal Pradesh	Jwalamukhi Pitham	Tongue	Goddess Jwala	
16	Mangla Gauri Temple	Gaya	Bihar	Gaya Pitham	Breast	Goddess Sarvamangala	
17	Vishalakshi Temple	Varanasi	Uttar Pradesh	Varanasi Pitham	Earrings	Goddess Vishalakshi	
18	Sharada Peeth	Sharda	Pakistan Occupied Kashmir	Sharada Pitham	Right hand	Goddess Sharada	

Sharada Peeth is currently in a ruined state. Only ruins are found in these places. Its ruins are near the Line of Control (LOC) between the Indian and Pakistani-controlled portions of the former princely state of Kashmir and Jammu. Instead, Sringeri Sharada pitham, Sringeri in Karnataka even though not a Shakta pithas, (Note: Currently, a new Sharada pitha temple has been inaugurated and consecrated by the Indian Government and the Sringeri Sharada Peetham in 2023, in Kupwara district, Jammu and Kashmir, on the other side of the LOC and much farther from the original temple. The Indian Government is planning an international corridor between the old Sharada pitha and India.) is this aspect of the goddess. It is believed that Goddess Sharada moved from her ruined temple in Kashmir to live in the new temple in Sringeri. Requests have been made by the Hindu community in Pakistan to the Pakistani government to renovate the temple, the issue being raised by former Indian Home minister L. K. Advani to the Pakistan authorities by increasing the people-to-people cross-border interaction.

==== In Skanda Purana ====
As per the Sankara Samhita of Skanda Purana,

1. Sri Sankari Pitham (Sri Lanka)
2. Sri Simhika Pitham (Simhala)
3. Sri Manika Pitham (Draksharamam, Dakshavati)
4. Sri Shadkala Pitham (Peethapuram)
5. Sri Bhramaramba Pitham (Srisailam)
6. Sri Vijaya Pitham (Vijayapura)
7. Sri Mahalakshmi Pitham (Kolhapur)
8. Sri padmakshi renuka Pitham (Mahurgad)
9. Sri Kamakoti Pitham (Kanchipuram)
10. Sri Kuchananda Pitham (Salagrama)
11. Sri Biraja Pitham (Jajpur)
12. Sri Bhadreshwari Pitham (Harmyagiri)
13. Sri Mahakali Pitham (Ujjain)
14. Sri Vindhyavasini Pitham (Vindhya mountains)
15. Sri Mahayogi Pitham (Ahicchatra)
16. Sri Kanyaka Pitham (Kanyakumari)
17. Sri Vishalakshi Pitham (Varanasi)
18. Sri Saraswati Pitham (Kashmir)
19. Sri Ugratara Shakta pitha (Saharsa)
20. Sri Abhirami Pitham (Padmagiri, Dindigul)

=== List of all Shakti Pith ===
"Shakti" refers to the Goddess worshipped at each location, all being manifestations of Goddess Sati; later known as Parvati or Durga. "Bhairava" refers to the corresponding consort, each a manifestation of Shiva. "Body Part or Ornament" refers to the body part or piece of jewellery that fell to earth, at the location on which the respective temple is built.

Different texts and temple traditions sometimes identify the same pitha differently, or associate a site with different body parts, goddess names, or Bhairava forms. Some traditions list 51 pithas, while others, such as Matsya Purana list 108. Many local goddess shrines are understood as manifestations or parts of Shakti. One such list is available in the text 'Tantrachūḍamanī' where Parvati tells these details to her son Skanda. Vindhyavasini Devi Temple at Vindhyachal is considered a Shakta pitha, though no body parts of Sati is linked with the site. Vindhyavasini is considered the combined form of all 108 Shakta pithas as mentioned in the Devi Bhagavata Purana text. In the Krishna birth legend, Vindhyavasini took birth in Gokula to Nanda and Yashoda as per the instruction of Lord Vishnu. Vasudeva replaced his son Krishna with this girl child of Yashoda. When Kamsa tried to kill the girl, she slipped from his hands, assumed her true form and warned Kamsa that his killer (Krishna) still lived on. She left Mathura and the goddess chose the Vindhya Mountains as her abode to live on the earth. The following list includes pithas identified in different textual and local traditions.

Sr. No.	Place	State in India/Country	Body part or ornament	Shakti	Bhairava	Image
1	A. Amarnath Temple, from Srinagar through Pahalgam; B. Shri Parvat in Ladakh	Jammu and Kashmir	A. Throat; B. Anklet	Mahamaya Devi	Trisandhyeshwar (Amarnath)	
2	Attahas Temple, Birbhum	West Bengal	Lips	Phullara Devi	Vishweshwar	
3	Bahula Temple, Purba Bardhaman	West Bengal	Left arm	Goddess Bahuladevi	Bhirukeshwar	
4	Bakreshwar Temple Birbhum	West Bengal	Portion between the eyebrows	Mahishamardini devi	Vakranatheshwar	
5	Vimala Temple, (Inside Jagannath Temple), Puri, (Only place where both Shakta pitha and a dham exists together)	Odisha	Foot	Vimala Devi	Jagannatheshwar	
6	Bhabanipur Temple, Bogura	Bangladesh	Left anklet (ornament)	Aparna Devi	Vamaneshwar	
7	Biraja Temple, Jajpur	Odisha	Navel	Biraja Devi	Varaheshwar (Varaha)	
8	Mithila, near Janakpur (This place is worshipped as the birthplace of Goddess Sita)	Nepal	Left shoulder	Uma Devi	Mahodareshwar	
9	Mahamaya Temple, Kathmandu.	Nepal	Both knees	Mahamaya Devi	Kapali	
10	Guhyeshwari Temple (Note: The Guhyeshwari temple should not be confused with the Shakta pitha mentioned in the Peethanirnaya from Tantra Chudamani, where Sati's both knees are said to have fallen in Nepal and the presiding deity is Mahamaya. According to the Nepal Mahatmya 11.107 and 1.38, Sati's both knees fell near the confluence of the Vishnumati and Bagmati rivers, where the presiding deity is Mahamaya, while the Anus fell near the Bagmati river close to the Mrigasthali of the Pashupati temple, and the deity is Guhyeshwari or Guhyakali.), near the bank of the Bagmati river, east of the Pashupatinath temple.	Nepal	Anus	Guhyakali Devi	Pashupati	
11	Muktinath Temple (This temple is also worshipped by Vaishnavites).	Nepal	Head	Gandaki Chandi Devi (also as goddesses Lakshmi)	Chakrapani Bhairava (also worshipped as Lord Vishnu)	
12	Saptashrungi Temple, Nashik	Maharashtra	Chin (2 parts)	Bhadrakali Saptashrungi Devi	Vikritaksheshwar	
13	Hinglaj Mata Temple, Balochistan	Pakistan	Brahmarandhra (soft back part of the head)	Hinglaj Devi	Bhimalochaneshwar	
14	Kalipeeth Temple, Kalighat, Kolkata	West Bengal	Right toes	Kali Devi	Nakuleshwar	
15	Kamakhya Temple, Guwahati	Assam	Yoni (genitals)	Kamakhya Devi	Umanandeshwar or Bhayanandeshwar	
16	Kankalitala Temple, Birbhum	West Bengal	Waist	Devgarbha Devi	Rurunatheshwar	
17	Kanya Kumari Temple, Kanyakumari	Tamil Nadu	Back	Kanyakumari Devi	Nimisheshwar	
18	Bajreshwari Mata Temple, Kangra	Himachal Pradesh	Left Breast	Jayadurga Devi	Abhirunatheshwar	
19	Kiriteswari Temple, Murshidabad	West Bengal	Crown	Kiriteshwari Devi	Sanvarteshwar	
20	Ratnavali Temple, Hooghly (locally known as Anandamayee Tala)	West Bengal	Right Shoulder	Kumari Devi	Ghanteshwar	
21	Bhramari Devi Temple, Jalpaiguri	West Bengal	Left leg	Bhramari Devi	Ambareshwar	
22	Holy stone shrine near Mansarovar Lake, Mount Kailash, Tibet	China	Right hand	Dakshayani Devi	Kailashnath	
23	Ugratara Asthan Temple	Bihar	Left Eye	Goddess Tara	Saharsa	
24	Manibandh Temple, Pushkar	Rajasthan	Wrists	Gayatri Devi	Sarvanandeshwar	
25	Indrakshi Temple, Nainativu	Sri Lanka	Silambu (Anklets)	Indrakshi Devi (Nagapooshani / Bhuvaneshvari)	Rakshaseshwar (Nayanair)	
26	Jayanti Durga Temple, Nartiang Jaintia Hills district.	Meghalaya	Left thigh	Jayanti Devi	Kramadishwar	
27	Jeshoreshwari Kali Temple	Bangladesh	Palms of hands and soles of the feet	Jeshoreshwari Devi	Chandeshwar	
28	Jwalamukhi Temple, Kangra	Himachal Pradesh	Tongue	Jwalamukhi Devi (Ambika)	Unmatta Bhairaveshwar	
29	Panchsagar Temple, Champawat	Uttarakhand	Lower teeth/ Navel	Varahi Devi	Maharudra	
30	Near Somnath temple, Veraval, Gir Somnath district. It is nearby Triveni Sangam.	Gujarat	Stomach	Chandrabhaga Devi	Vakratundeshwar	
31	Alopi Devi Mandir near Sangam at Prayagraj	Uttar Pradesh	Finger	Alopi Devi	Bhaveshwar	
32	Bhadrakali Temple, either in Kurukshetra or Thanesar	Haryana	Ankle bone	Bhadrakali Devi	Sthanu	
33	Maa Sharda Mandir, Maihar	Madhya Pradesh	Necklace	Sharada Devi	Chandeshwar	
34	Nandikeshwari Temple, Sainthia city	West Bengal	Necklace	Nandini Devi	Nandikeshwar	
35	Manikyamba Temple, Draksharamam, Kakinada	Andhra Pradesh	Navel	Manikyamba	Bheemeshwar	
36	Naina Devi Temple	Himachal Pradesh	Right eye	Mahishamardini Devi	Krodhishwar	
37	Narmada temple, at the source point of Narmada River in Amarkantak	Madhya Pradesh	Right buttock	Narmada Devi	Bhadraseneshwar	
38	Bhramaramba Temple, Srisailam	Andhra Pradesh, India	Neck	Bhramarambika Devi	Mallikarjuna	
39	Narayani Temple, Suchindram	Tamil Nadu	Upper teeth	Narayani Devi	Sihareshwar	
40	Sugandha Temple, situated in Shikarpur, Gournadi, about 20 km from Barisal town	Bangladesh	Nose	Sugandha Devi	Trayambakeshwar	
41	Tripura Sundari temple, Udaipur	Tripura	Right leg	Tripura Sundari (Third mahavidya) (main form of Parvati)	Kameshwar	
42	Ujaani, Purba Bardhaman district	West Bengal	Right wrist	Mangal Chandika	Kapilambareshwar	
43	Vishalakshi Temple, Varanasi	Uttar Pradesh	Earring	Vishalakshi Devi	Kala Bhairaveshwar	
44	Vibhash Shakta pitha, Purba Medinipur	West Bengal	Left ankle	Kapalini Devi (Bhimarupa) also known as Bargabhima Devi	Sarvanandeshwar	
45	Ambika Shakta pitha, Bharatpur, India	Rajasthan	Fingers of Left Leg	Ambika Devi	Amritaksheshwar	
46	Katyayini Shakta pitha, Vrindavan	Uttar Pradesh	Ringlets of hair	Katyayini Devi	Bhuteshwar	
47	Devi Talab Mandir, Jalandhar	Punjab	Left Breast	Tripuramalini Devi	Bhishaneshwar	
48	Baidyanath Dham, Deoghar	Jharkhand	Heart	Jayadurga Devi	Vaidyanath	
49	Adi Kamakshi Amman Temple (behind Kamakshi Amman Temple), Kanchipuram	Tamil Nadu	Odyanam (Navel)	Kamakshi Devi (Saumya Kali)	Ekambareshwar	
50	Jogadya, Burdwan district	West Bengal	Big Toe	Jogadya Devi	Ksheerkantakeshwar	
51	Puruhutika Temple, Kakinada, Pithapuram	Andhra Pradesh	Hip part	Puruhutika	Durvaseshwar	
52	Arasuri Ambaji Shakta pitha at Gabbar Hill (Golden Temple of Gujarat)	Gujarat	Heart	Amba	Batuka Bhairava	
53	Danteshwari Temple, Dantewada	Chhattisgarh	Tooth	Danteshwari Devi	Kapala Bhairava	
54	Tara Tarini, Brhamapur, Ganjam	Odisha	Breast	Tara Tarini Devi	Tumbeshwar	
55	Nalhateswari, Nalhati	West Bengal	Stomach/Nauli	Kalika Devi	Jogeshwar	
56	Avanti Temple, Ujjain	Madhya Pradesh	Elbow	Avanti Devi	Lambkarneshwar	
57	Shankari Temple, originally located in an unknown place. This shrine is now identified with Koneswaram Temple in Trincomalee.	Sri Lanka	Groin	Shankari Devi	Trikoneshwar	
58	Mahalakshmi Temple, Shri Shail, Sylhet	Bangladesh	Neck	Mahalakshmi	Sambaranandeshwar	
59	Dhakeshwari Temple (now relocated at Dhakeswari Mata Temple), (Note: The main idol of the Dhakeshwari Shakta pitha in Bangladesh is currently located to the Kumartuli Dhakeshwari Temple in Kolkata, West Bengal. The temple priest fled to India with the main idol during the partition via a specially chartered train. While in the original shrine, a replica is placed. The original holy gem of Goddess Sati was lost long before (the factual date is unknown). So for the actual idol, visit the Kumartoli shrine.) Kumartoli	Dhaka, Bangladesh Currently in West Bengal, India	Gem of Sati's Crown	Dhakeshwari Devi (a form of Durga)	Shiva	
60	Tarapith Rampurhat	West Bengal	Third eye	Tara Devi (second mahavidya)	Chandrachuda Bhairava	
61	Chinnamastika Temple, Chintpurni	Himachal Pradesh	Foot	Chhinnamastika Devi	Rudra Mahadeva	
62	Kaali Mandir,Pavagadh Archaeological Park.	Gujarat	Right leg toe	Mahakali Devi	Batuka Bhairava	
63	Aranya Devi Temple, Arrah	Bihar	Right thigh	Aranyani	Bhuma Bhairava	
64	Tuljabhavani Temple, Tuljapur	Maharashtra		Tuljabhavani Devi	Bhairava	
65	Vaishno Devi Temple, Katra	Jammu and Kashmir	Skull/Right arm	Vaishno Devi	Bhairava	
66	Tripura Sundari Temple, Banswara	Rajasthan	Unknown	Goddess Tripura Sundari	Aanand Bhairava	
67	Chattal Bhavani Temple, Chittagong	Bangladesh	Upper teeth	Chattal Bhawani Devi	Chandrashekhar	
68	Harsiddhi Devi Mandir, Rangir, Rangir	Madhya Pradesh	Thigh (Raan)	Harsiddhi Devi Harsiddhi Devi	Bhairav	[[]]
69	Jnanakshi Rajarajeshwari Temple, Bengaluru	Karnataka	Ear	Goddess Tripura Sundari as Rajarajeshwari	Abiru Bhairava	

== See also ==
- Hindu pilgrimage (yatra)
- Hindu pilgrimage sites
- List of Hindu temples
- List of Mansa Devi temples
- Tarapith Temple
