= Bahula Temple =

Hindu temple in West Bengal, India

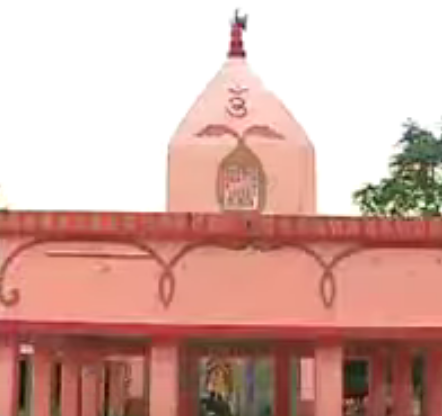
- Bahula Temple

- Location within West Bengal Location within India

Religion
- Affiliation: Hinduism
- Deity: Bahula

Location
- Location: Ketugram, Purba Bardhaman district
- State: West Bengal
- Country: India
- Interactive map of Bahula Temple
- Coordinates: 23°42′01″N 88°02′30″E

Bahula Temple, or Shri Bahula Shaktipeeth, is a Hindu temple situated in the Ketugram at Katwa Subdivision in the Purba Bardhaman district of West Bengal, India. It is one of the 51 Shakti Pithas. The temple is dedicated to Goddess Bahula a form of Devi Parvati.
