= Devi Kanya Kumari =

Hindu goddess

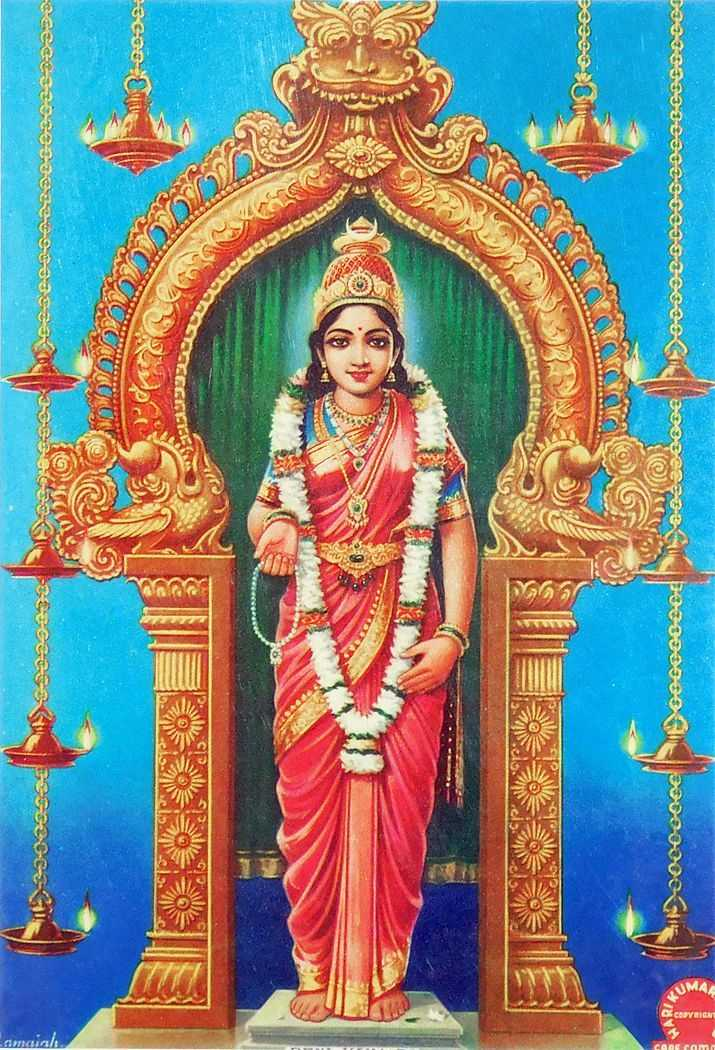
- Poster of the deity
- Tamil: கன்னியாகுமாரி transl. The maiden goddess
- Affiliation: Shaktism, Shaivism, Vaishnavism
- Abode: Kanyakumari
- Mantra: kātyayanāya vidmahe kanyakumāri dhīmahi tanno durgiḥ pracodayāt
- Weapon: Rosary
- Mount: Tiger or Lion

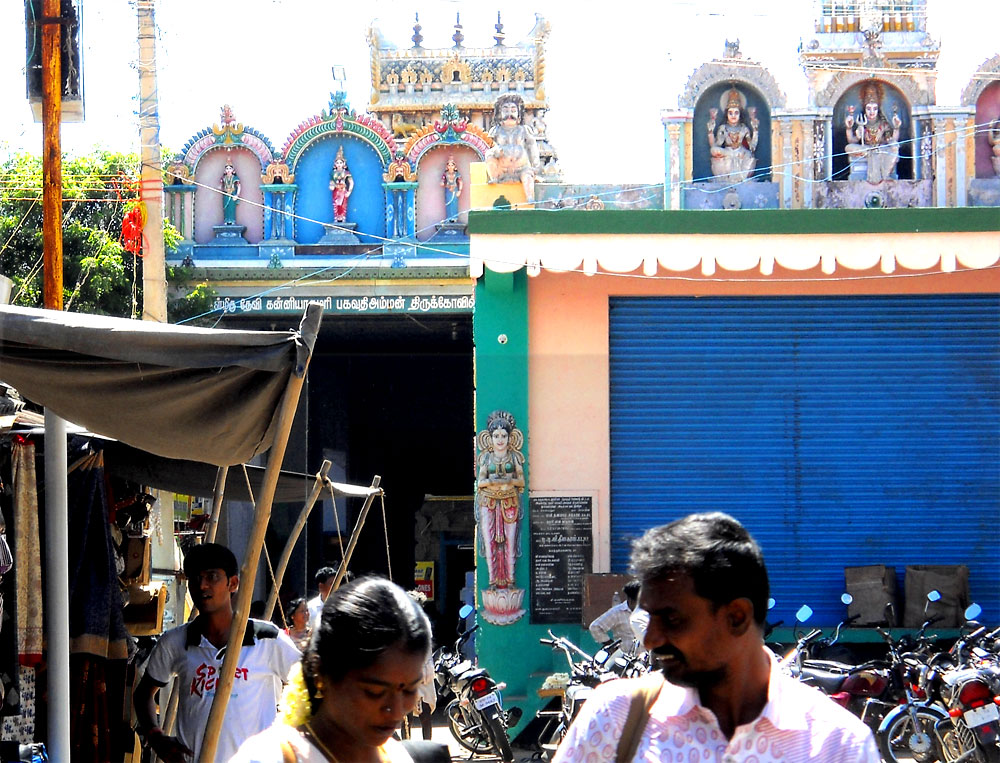
Entrance to the Bhagavati Kumari Amman Temple, Kanyakumari.

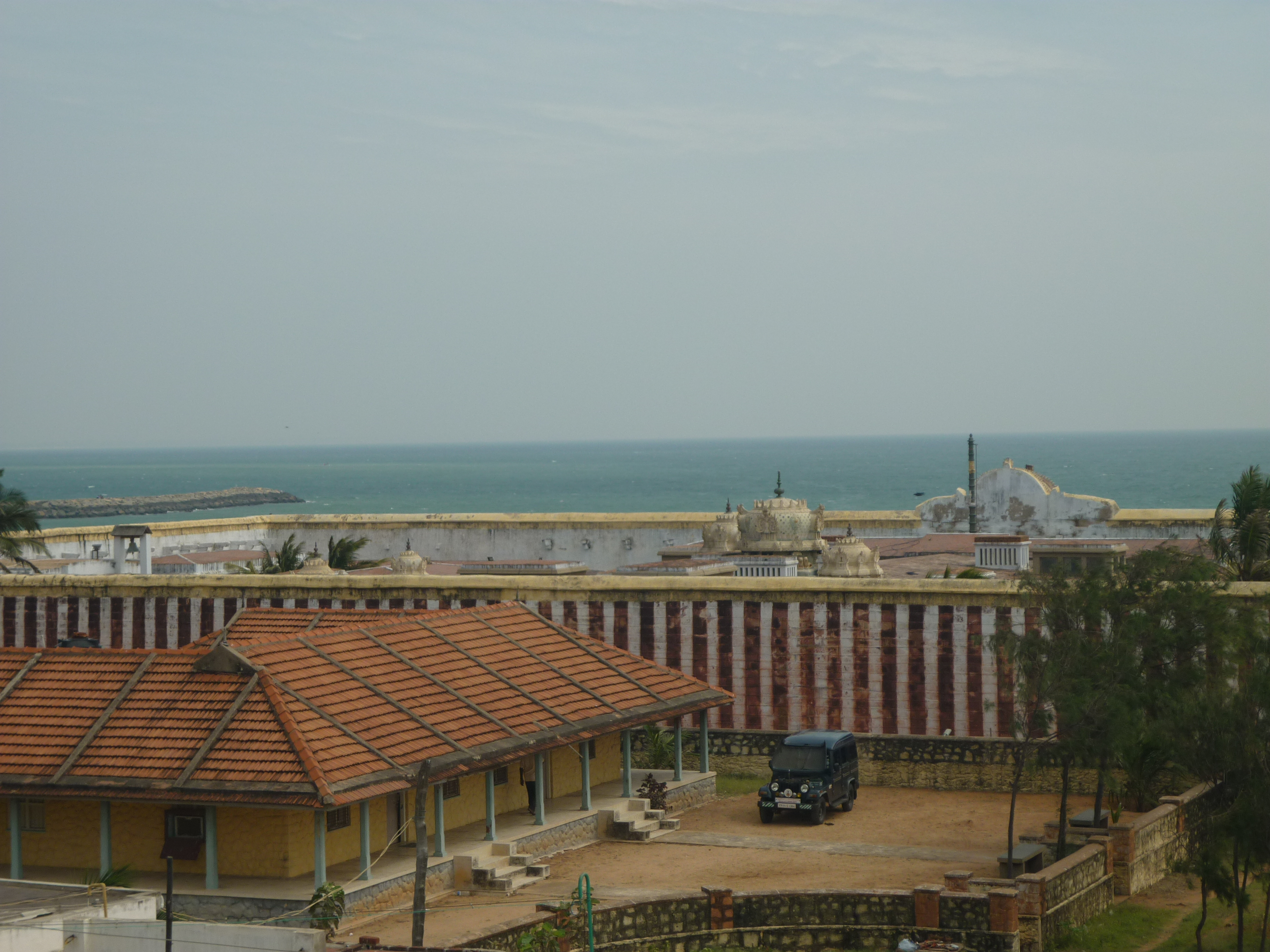
A view from atop the temple towards the Indian Ocean

Devi Kanya Kumari (Tamil: கன்னியாகுமரி) (Sanskrit: देवी कन्या कुमारि, romanized: Dēvi Kanyā Kumāri) is a manifestation of the Hindu goddess Mahadevi in the form of an adolescent girl. She is variously described by various traditions of Hinduism to be a form of Parvati. She is also worshipped as an incarnation of the goddess Bhadrakali by Shaktas, and is known by several names such as Shrī Bāla Bhadra, Shrī Bāla, Kanya Devi, and Devi Kumari.

== Origin ==
The goddess is inextricably tied to the eponymous town of Kanyakumari, situated at the southernmost tip of Tamil Nadu. The worship of Devi Kanya Kumari is also associated with the Kumari Kandam, a mythical lost continent. Kanya Kumari is regarded to be the goddess who killed the demon Banasura, who performed a continuous penance with utmost austerities. The Vaishnava Saint Vadiraja Tirtha, in his Tirtha Prabhanda, describes Kanya Kumari as Lakshmi, who descended upon the earth to slay Banasura.

Devi Kanya Kumari has been mentioned in Ramayana, Mahabharata, and the Sangam works Manimekalai, Purananuru and the Nārāyaṇa (Mahānārāyaṇa) Upanishad, a Vaishnava Upanishad in the Taittiriya Samhita of Krishna Yajur Veda.

The author of Periplus of the Erythraean Sea (60-80 CE) has written about the prevalence of the propitiation of the deity Kanyakumari in the extreme southern part of India; "There is another place called Comori and a harbour, hither come those men who wish to consecrate themselves for the rest of their lives, and bath and dwell in celibacy and women also do the same; for it is told that a goddess once dwelt here and bathed." Kanyakumari was under the rule of the Chera Dynasty followed by the rulers and kings of Travancore under the overall suzerainty of the British until 1947, when India became independent. Travancore joined the independent India in 1947. Later in the state partition, Kanyakumari became part of Tamil Nadu.

The feminine aspects of Adi Parashakti (in its manifested and un-manifested forms) are called as Prakriti, and the male aspects are called as Purusha. The Prakriti is addressed in different names by different Hindu communities as Adi-parashakti, Bhadra, Shakti, Devi, Bhagavati, Amman, Rajarajeshwari, Shodashi; in different locations. All the material manifested aspects the Nature is classified as feminine and is the Prakriti or Mother Goddess and also the un-manifested forms Knowledge, Prosperity and Power are considered as feminine Prakriti, and it is source of energy for Creation, Sustain and Control, which is the male aspect (Purusha) of Prabrahma.

In Tantra, the worship of Prakriti is done in different methods: Dakshinachara (Right-Hand Path) (Sātvika rites), Vamachara (Left-Hand Path) (Rajas rites) and Madhyama (Mixed) (Tamasa rites) in different temples. The name of Devi in temples during Sātvika or Dakshina rites is 'Shrī Bhagavati' and Vaama (left method) rites is called 'Maha Devi' similar to Maha Vidya.

=== Legend ===
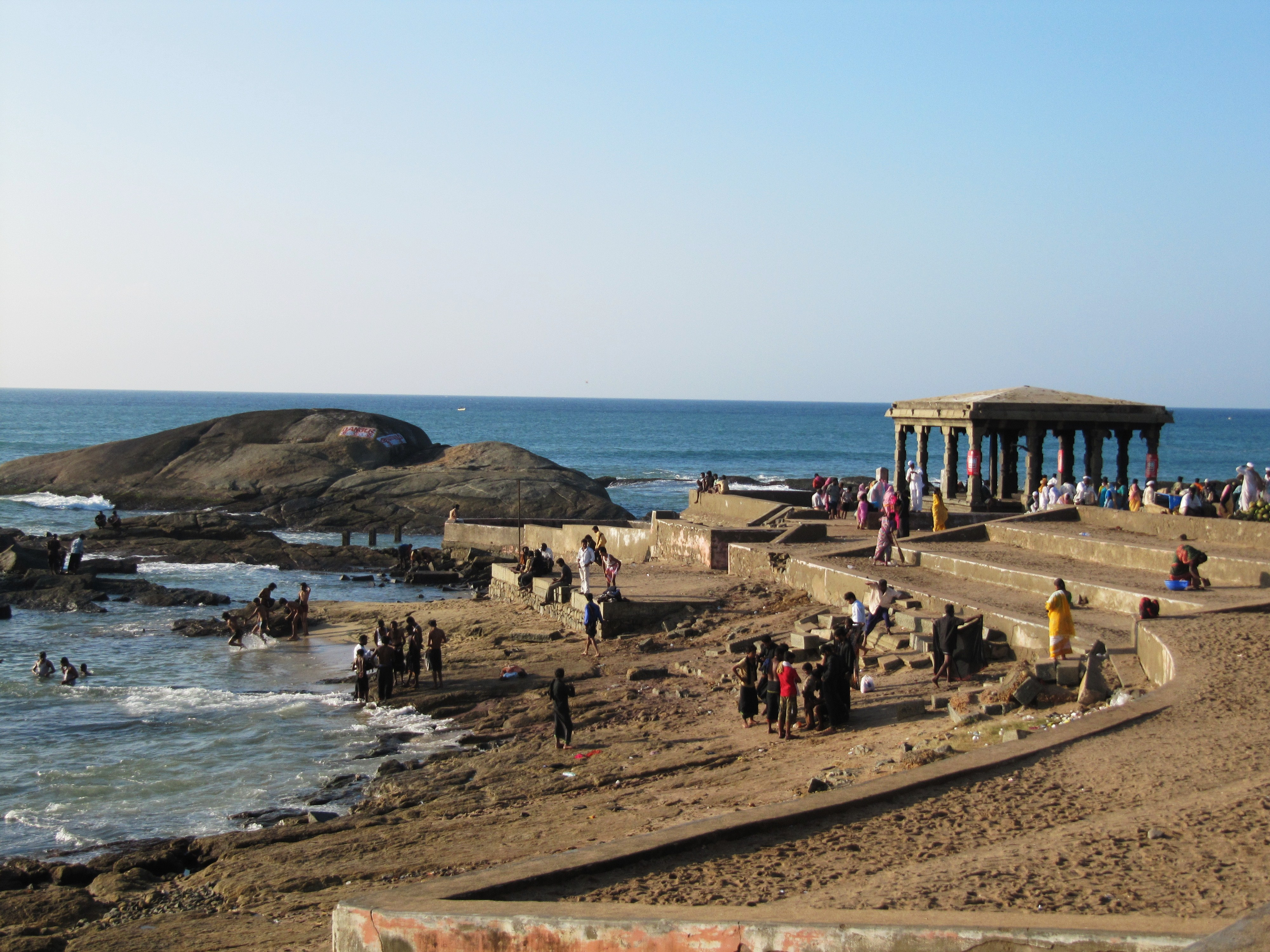
The confluence of the Arabian Sea, Bay of Bengal and the Indian Ocean at the temple

Banasura, a demon by birth, was the ruler of the land of Kanyakumari. He was a very powerful king. He practiced tapasya and obtained a boon from Brahma that his death could only be caused by an adolescent girl.

With this powerful boon, he became fearless and wreaked havoc on the entire world. He went on to conquer and oust Indra from his throne. He banished all the devas from their abode. The devas, who were the personification of the basic natural elements, Agni (fire), Varuna (water), Vayu (air) became uncoordinated, and havoc spread in the universe, because Indra (ether) was not able to administer and coordinate the Pancha Bhoota.

According to local folklore, It was believed that only Bhagavati would be able to restore order. Bhagavati manifested herself in the southern tip of the subcontinent as Kumari, to kill Banasura and restore the balance of nature. As an adolescent girl, she had immense devotion towards the deity Shiva. Shiva decided to marry her. All arrangements were made for the wedding. Shiva started the journey from Shuchindram. The wedding muhurtam, or auspicious time, was during the Brahma muhurtam, which was pre-morning. The sage Narada, observing that only a virgin goddess would be able to slay Banasura, caused a rooster to crow, indicating that the auspicious time for the wedding had passed. Thus, he was able to interrupt Shiva's marriage to Kanya Kumari. Kumari waited for Shiva, and finally, she assumed that she had been snubbed. With unbearable insult, pain, grief, and anger, she destroyed everything she saw. She threw away all the food and broke her bangles. The food particles she scattered around are said to be the source of the colourful sands of Kanyakumari. When she finally gained her composure, she undertook continuous penance. Ages later, Banasura tried to lure and approach Kumari, without realising who she was. The infuriated Kumari slaughtered Banasura at once. Moments before his death, Banasura realised that the one before him was Adi Parashakti, the Goddess herself. He prayed her to absolve him of his sins. After killing Banasura, Kumari assumed her original form of Parvati, and reunited with her husband, Shiva. Kumari maintained her divine presence in the place, in the Bhagavati Kumari Amman Temple.

According to Vaishnavism, the saint Vadiraja Tirtha states in his Tirtha Prabandha that Devi Kanya Kumari is a form of the goddess Lakshmi herself, who descended upon the earth to kill the demon Banasura, who was a devotee of Shiva.

Sri Yantra in diagrammatic form

== Worship ==
The Bhagavati Kumari Amman Temple is one of the 52 Shakta pithas. It is believed that the back spine area of Sati's corpse fell here creating the presence of Kundalini Shakti in the region.

The shrine is accessed through the Western door. The eastern door is opened only on certain days of a year, as on the new moon days in the months of Thai, Aadi (Karkidaka) July, during Navaratri and in the month of Kaartikai. For the purpose of rites and rituals in the temple of Kumari is imagined as (Sankalpam) as Bālambika, the child goddess. The goddess is considered as Katyayani, one of the Navadurgas here. She is also considered as Bhadrakali by the devotees while worshipping her.

Devi Kanya Kumari is the goddess of virginity and penance. It is a practice that people choose to receive the Diksha of Sanyasa from here in olden times. The rites and rituals of the temple are organized and classified according to Sankaracharya's treatise.

The other attractions inside the temple are the Pathala Ganga Tirtha, Kalabhairava Shrine. Kalabhairava is a ferocious form of Shiva who annihilates kala, or time itself. Each of the 51 Shakta pitha has a Kalabhairava shrine within the temple meant for the protection of the temple. The name of the Kalabhairava in Kanyakumari temple is 'Nimish' and the Shakti is 'Sarvani' and in the Shakta pitha of Shuchindram the Kalabhairava is 'Samhāra' and the Shakti is 'Narayani'. These are two Shakta pithas out of the 51 Shakta pithas all over South Asia. There are also shrines to Vijayasundari and Balasundari, friends and playmates of the Goddess in her youthful form.

Navarathri Mandapam is a hall where devotees can display their artistic ability in music as a dedication to the goddess, Shri Pāda Pāra is a rock in the shape of Kumari's feet. This is now famous as Vivekananda Paara, where Swami Vivekananda got enlightenment to dedicate his life as an active Sanyasi rather than the usual practice of being passive.

The presiding image is sported in standing posture with an Akshamala in her hands. There is an image of a lion in her pedestal indicating that she is the form of Adi Parashakti. There is a four-pillar hall in the temple, each of which gives out sounds of Veena (a string instrument), Mridangam (a percussion instrument), flute and Jalatarang (porcelain instrument).

The Gayatri mantra of Devi Kanyakumari is: "kātyayanāya vidmahe kanyakumāri dhīmahi tanno durgiḥ prachodayāt"

Red Sarees and Ghee wick lamps are offered to the goddess by devotees. Reciting Lalita Sahasranama while approaching and circumambulating the temple is considered auspicious.

== Significance ==
The Bhagavati Kumari Amman Temple in Kanyakumari, Tamil Nadu is dedicated to her. It is located at the southern tip of main land India, on the confluence of the Bay of Bengal, the Arabian Sea, and the Indian Ocean. Legend attributes Sage Parashurama for performing the consecration of the temple. The goddess is said to remove rigidity of the mind; devotees usually feel the tears in their eyes or even inside their mind when they pray to the goddess in devotion and contemplation.

== Temple festivals ==
- Chitra Pournima Festival: on the Full moon day in May
- Navaratri festival: 9 day festival in (September–October). The music artists get an opportunity to offer their artistic skill to the goddess by performing in the Navarathri Mandapam.
- Vaisakha festival: 10-day festival in May–June culminating by a Thoni Ezhunellathu in May–June. During this festival Devi will be taken in procession both in the morning and evening, during Aaraatu the eastern door is opened. On the ninth day, the Thoni Ezhunellathu takes place. Devi will be taken round the water on the western part in a boat.
- Kalabham festival: The idol is smeared in Sandal paste in the last Friday of the month of Karkidaka or Aadi, in July–August.

== Administration and worship schedule ==
The temple is opened for darshan from 6.00 a.m. to 11.00 a.m. and 4.00 p.m. to 8.00 p.m. The temple is maintained and administered by the Hindu Religious and Charitable Endowments Department of the Government of Tamil Nadu.

== See also ==
- Kaumari
- Kumari (goddess)
- Kanwari
- Matrikas
- Suchindram Temple, Kanyakumari
- Nagaraja Temple, Nagercoil, Nagarcoil
- Sree Padmanabha Swamy Temple, Trivandrum
- Attukal Temple, Trivandrum
- Kottiyoor Vysakha Mahotsavam, Kannur
- Kodungallur Bhagavathy Temple, Thrissur
- Kamakshi Amman Temple, Kanchipuram
- Meenakshi Amman Temple, Madurai
- Mookambika Devi Temple, Mangalore
