= Batuka Bhairava =

Form of Shiva

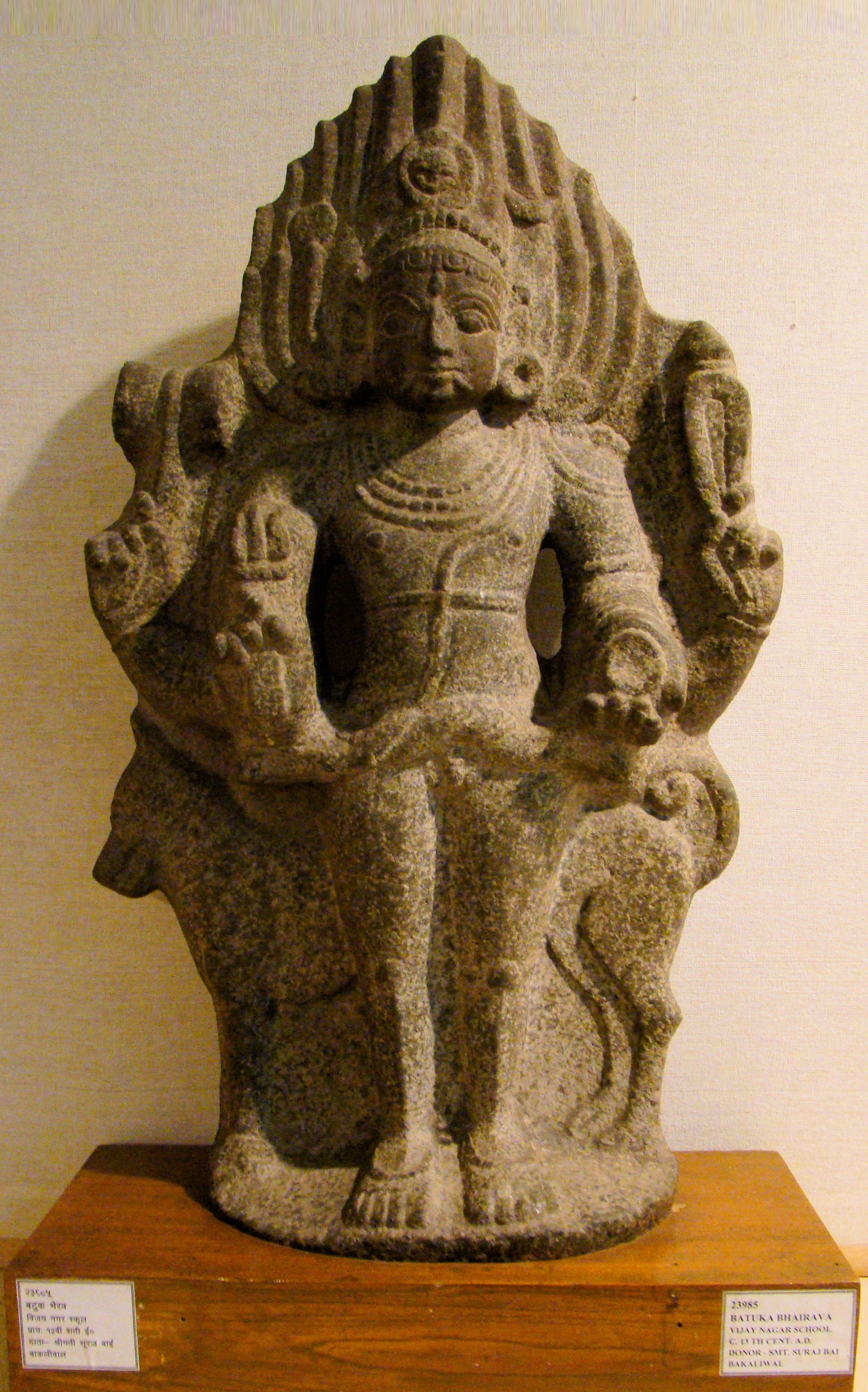
Batuka Bhairava, Vijay Nagar School, 13th century CE, Benaras Hindu University Museum.

Batuka Bhairava (Sanskrit: बटुकभैरव, romanized: Baṭukabhairava) is a fierce form of Shiva in Hindu iconography, associated with his manifestation of Bhairava. This form of Shiva is depicted as a fierce, nude youth, usually accompanied with a dog in the Tantric tradition.

== Iconography ==
In the Rupamandana, Batuka Bhairava is prescribed to be depicted with eight arms, in which six hold the khatvanga (club), the pasha (whip), the shula (spear), the damaru (drum), the kapala (skullcup), and a snake, with the other two carrying a piece of flesh and expressing the abhaya mudra. A dog is stated to be depicted nearby, the same shade as the deity.

The Sharadatilaka Tantra text prescribes various depictions of the deity according to their sattva, rajas, and tamas gunas.
