= Sati (Hindu goddess) =

First consort of the Hindu god Shiva

- Marital Felicity and Longevity
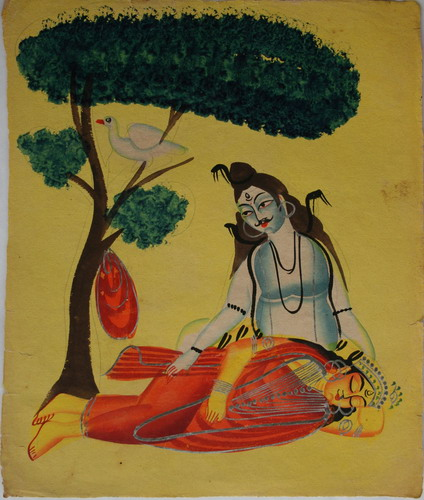
- Shiva mourns Sati, 19th-century Kalighat painting
- Other names: Dakshayani, Dakshakanya
- Devanagari: सती
- Sanskrit transliteration: Satī
- Affiliation: Devi
- Abode: Kailasha
- Texts: Puranas, Kumarasambhavam, Tantra

Genealogy
- Parents: Daksha (father); Prasuti (mother)
- Consort: Shiva

Sati (/ˈsʌtiː/, Sanskrit: सती, IAST: Satī, lit. 'truthful' or 'virtuous'), also known as Dakshayani (Sanskrit: दाक्षायणी, IAST: Dākṣāyaṇī, lit. 'daughter of Daksha'), is the Hindu goddess of marital felicity and longevity, and is worshipped as an aspect of the mother goddess Shakti. Sati was the first wife of Shiva, the other being Parvati, who was Sati's reincarnation after her death.

The earliest mentions of Sati are found in the time of the Ramayana and the Mahabharata, but details of her story appear in the Puranas. Legends describe Sati as the favourite child of Daksha, who marries Shiva against her father's wishes. Later, when Daksha organises a yajna (fire-sacrifice) in which he doesn't invite her and her husband, Sati goes to attend it, only to be humiliated by her father. She then immolates herself to protest against him. In Hinduism, both Sati and Parvati, successively play the role of bringing Shiva away from ascetic isolation into creative participation with the world.

Sati's story plays an important part in shaping the traditions of two of the most prominent sects of Hinduism — Shaivism and Shaktism. After Sati's death, Shiva carried her body around the world and started performing Tandava, the celestial dance of destruction. As he did so, the other deities requested Vishnu to stop this and he did so by using his Sudarshana Chakra which divided Sati's body parts falling on the ground at 51 different places. These places are now known as Shakti pithas, and they are sacred to Hindus.

== Etymology ==
The name "Satī" means "truthful", "virtuous" or "noble" in Sanskrit. The word is derived from the "sat" which means "truth".

She is known by various patronymics, though these names can be used for any of the daughters of Daksha. Some of these names include Dakshayani, Dakshakanya and Dakshaja.

== History and textual background ==
According to scholars William J. Winkins and David R. Kinsley, the Vedic scriptures (2nd millennium BCE) do not mention Sati-Parvati but hint to two goddesses associated with Rudra — Rudrani and Ambika. (Note: Rudrani is described as Rudra's wife. Ambika, on the other hand, is described as his sister in the earlier verses, but later verses suggest that she was his wife.) In the Kena Upanishad, a goddess called Uma-Hemavati appears as a mediator between the gods and the Supreme Brahman. (Note: Both Winkins and Kinsley note that later commentaries on Kena Upanishad confirm that Uma was Parvati, leaving no doubt about her relationship with Shiva.) Both the archeological and the textual sources indicate that the first major appearances of Sati-Parvati were during the period of the Ramayana and the Mahabharata (1st millennium BCE).

The Mahabharata mentions the destruction of Daksha yajna, the birth of Kartikeya, the defeat and death the Asura Tarakasura as well as some plays between Shiva and Uma (Parvati). Scholars believe that by the time of the Puranas (c. 4th - 13th century), legends of Sati and Parvati rose to prominence and these were adapted by Kalidasa in his epic poem Kumarasambhava (c. 5th - 6th century). Some of the Puranas which narrate Sati's story are the Vayu Purana, the Skanda Purana, the Bhagavata Purana, the Kurma Purana, the Padma Purana, the Linga Purana, the Shiva Purana, and the Matsya Purana.

== Legends ==
=== Birth and early life ===
Sati was the daughter of Daksha—A Prajapati (agent of creation) and the son of the creator god Brahma—and Prasuti—the daughter of Swayambhuva Manu. In some alternate accounts found in the Shiva Purana, Matsya Purana and Kalika Purana, her mother is mention to be Asikni. Sati is often mentioned as the youngest and the most beloved daughter of Daksha. According to the Shakta (goddess-oriented) texts including Devi Bhagavata and the Mahabhagavata Purana, before her birth, Brahma advised Daksha to meditate upon the Great goddess and convince her to take an avatar as their daughter (Sati). The goddess agreed but warned that if he mistreated her, she would abandon her body.

Even as a child, Sati adored the tales of Shiva and grew up an ardent devotee. As she grew to womanhood, the idea of marrying anyone else, as intended by her father, became unfair to her. It is believed that Brahma intended to get Sati married to Shiva and bring him into worldly affairs.

=== Marriage ===
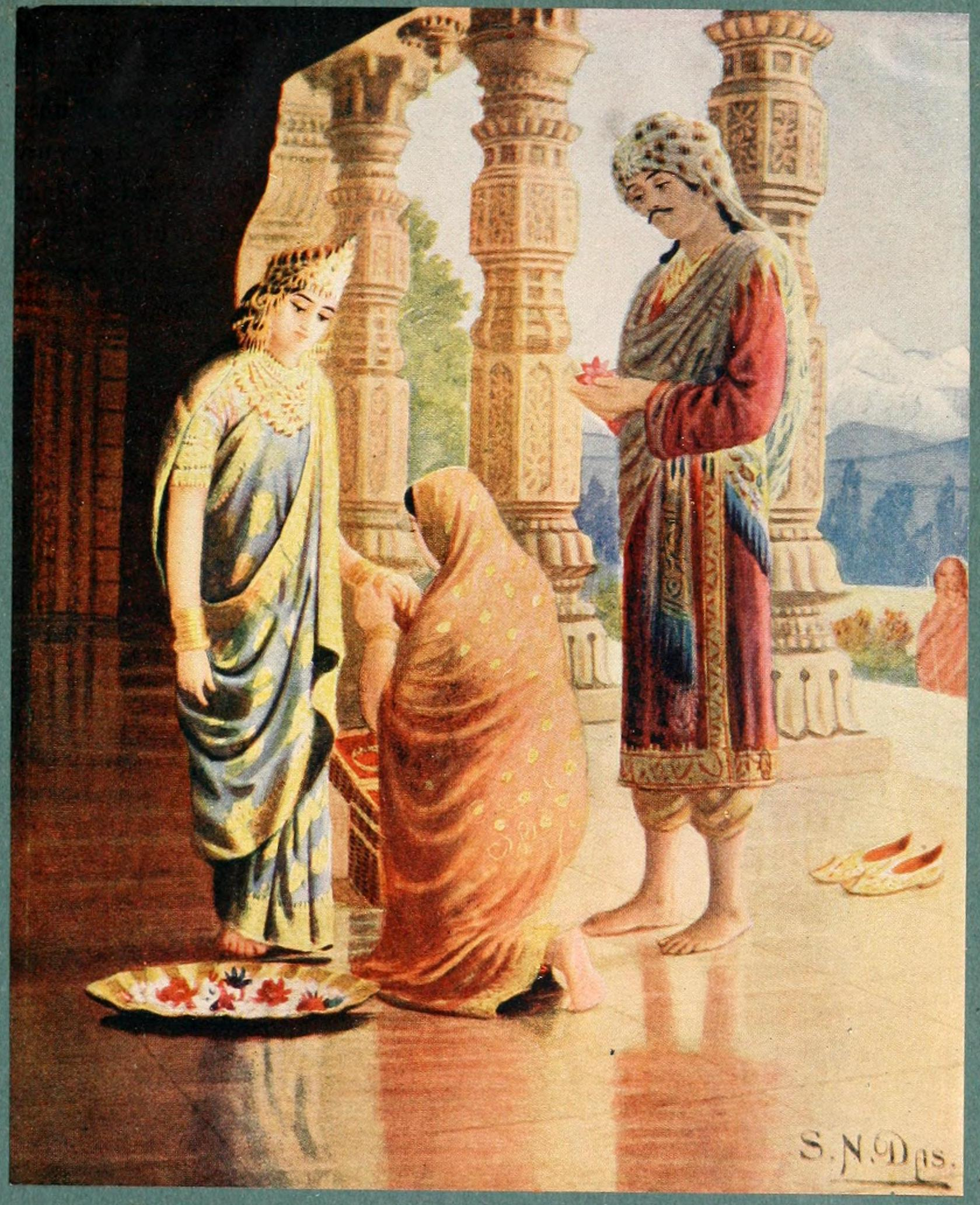
In Hinduism, Sati is considered as an ideal lady. The painting depicts her receiving gifts before her wedding from Kubera and his wife.

Sati is described to be very beautiful but the legends emphasize her penance and devotion, which won the heart of the ascetic Shiva. According to the legend, Sati left the luxuries of her father's palace and retired to a forest to devote herself to austerities of a hermetic life and the worship of Shiva. She was often tested by him or his attendants. Finally, Shiva acceded to her wishes and consented to marry. Despite Daksha's unwillingness, the wedding was held in due to Brahma. Sati moved with Shiva in Kailasha. Tension between Shiva and Daksha further arises when Daksha starts to hate Shiva because of Shiva's odd appearance and behaviour.

According to the Bhagavata Purana, Daksha arranged Sati's svayamvara (self-choice ceremony), where all except Shiva were invited. When Sati did not find Shiva, she threw a garland in the air to choose her husband. Shiva manifested there and it fell on him, thus they were married. In the 18th century Svathani Katha, when Shiva asked Sati's hand in marriage, Daksha refused, claiming him unsuitable. Vishnu aided Shiva by disguising him as a sannyasi and had him marry her. (Note: Further details: Vishnu advised Shiva to disguise as a sanyasi and ask for alms from Daksha. When Daksha promised to give anything, Shiva asked for Sati. During the marriage, Vishnu used his maya (illusion) to deceive Sati's parents.) While many versions of the tale mention Daksha's objections to the marriage, the Shiva Purana does not mention any harsh opposition, though he starts to develop a deep hatred after the wedding.

=== Testing Rama's divinity ===
In a legend from the Shiva Purana, Sati and Shiva were once wandering the earth. They passed through the Dandaka forest, where they came across Rama, accompanied by Lakshmana, searching for his wife Sita after her abduction by Ravana. Observing Rama's lament, Shiva bowed before him, following which he blessed the former with victory and revealed himself before him. Overcome by maya, Sati asked her consort to whom he had bowed. Shiva informed her that Rama was a full incarnation of Vishnu. Seeing that she was unconvinced, Shiva encouraged her to test Rama's divinity for herself. Sati did so by assuming the guise of Sita and appearing before him. Rama laughed, seeing through the goddess's disguise, wondering why she had assumed his wife's form. Her doubts fading, Sati asked Rama how he was worthy of being saluted by Shiva. Rama explained to her his true identity and circumstance and spoke to her of his devotion to Shiva, after which she praised him and returned to her consort.

=== Daksha yajna and self-immolation ===
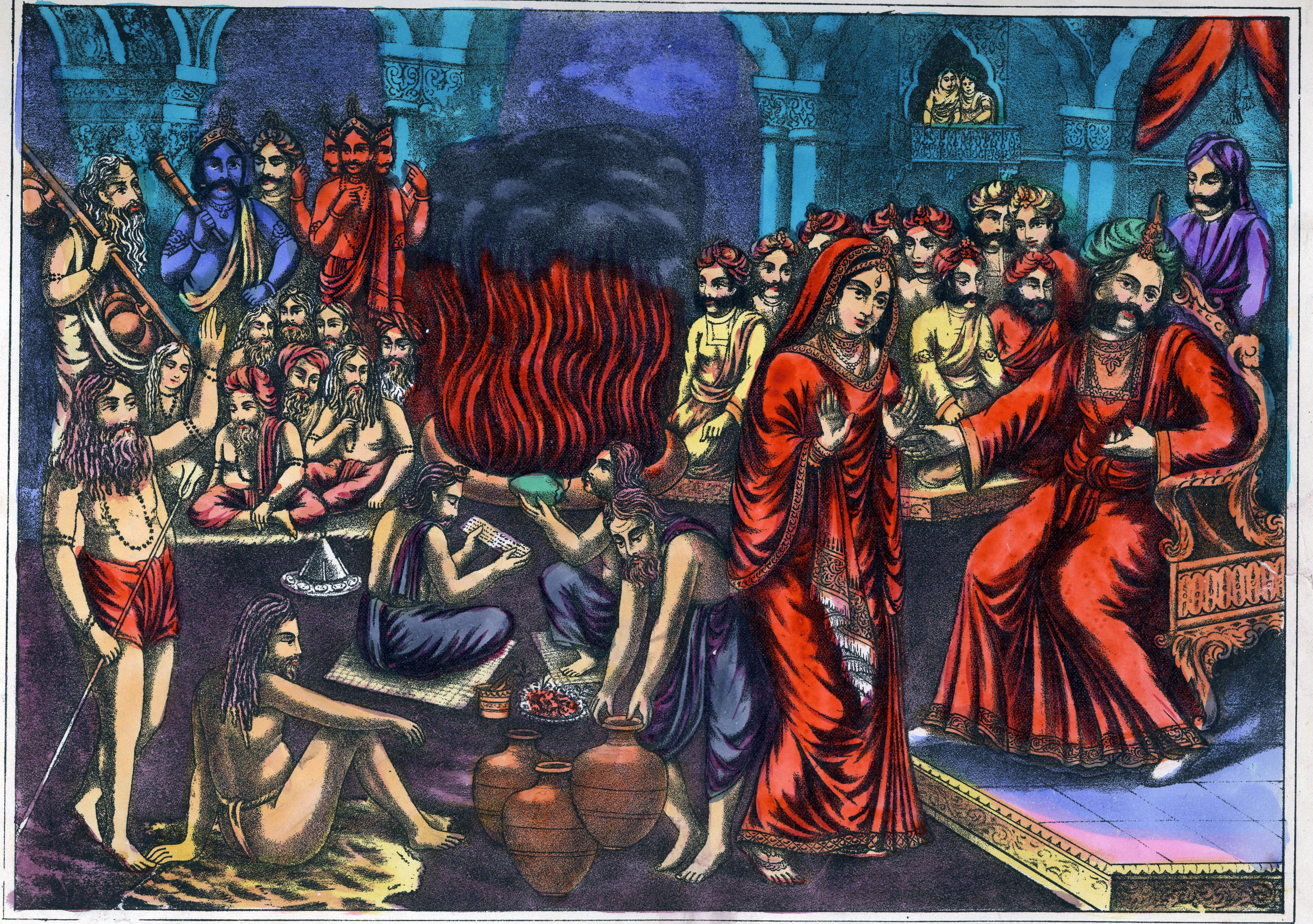
Sati confronts Daksha.

The most prominent legend associated with Sati is her self-immolation to protest against her father. The first text to mention Daksha Yajna is the Taittiriya Samhita and it later appears in the Ramayana and the Mahabharata. The narrative of Sati's self-immolation appears in the Puranas, Tantra literature, and in Kalidasa's lyrical Kumarasambhava.

According to the most popular narrative, Daksha organized a yajna (sacrifice) to which all the deities, except Sati and Shiva, were invited. Wanting to visit her relatives, Sati sought to rationalize this omission and reasoned that as family, such formality was unnecessary. Shiva tried to stop her as he knew that Daksha would humiliate her, but when she insisted on going, he sent her with his gana attendants. Sati was received by her mother and her sisters, but Daksha was furious by her uninvited arrival and humiliated her and mocked Shiva. Wanting to break all ties with her father and uphold the honour of her husband, Sati immolated herself.

Deeply hurt by the death of his wife, Shiva performed the destructive Tandava dance. He created two ferocious deities — Virabhadra and Bhadrakali, who wreaked mayhem at the sacrificial place. Nearly all those present were felled overnight; Daksha was decapitated by Virabhadra. After that night, Shiva, who is considered the all-forgiving, restored the slain to life and granted them his blessings. Daksha was restored both to life and to kingship. His severed head was substituted with that of a goat.

There are varying accounts of this event. The Devi-Bhagavata Purana adds the reason behind Daksha's harsh behaviour. Shortly after Sati's marriage, Daksha polluted a sacred flower garland and as a result, he was cursed to hate his beloved daughter. At the sacrificial place, after Daksha discarded Sati's gifts and humiliated her, she used her cosmic powers and burnt her body. Some texts suggest that before Sati's death, Shakti promised that she will be reborn to a father who merits her respect and remarry Shiva. The Mahabhagavata Purana presents Sati as a fierce warrior. When Shiva prevented Sati from visiting the event, she transformed into the ten fearsome Mahavidya goddesses led by Kali, and surrounded him from the ten cardinal directions. Seeing his wife's powers, Shiva allowed her. Sati, transformed as Kali, went to the sacrifice and split herself into two entities — one real but invisible and another just Chhaya (shadow or clone). Chhaya Sati destroyed the sacred event by jumping into the sacrificial fire, while the "real" Sati is reborn as Parvati. The Brihaddharma Purana (c. 13th century) narrates the creation of the Mahavidyas but there is no mention of Sati splitting into two. She retains her calming nature after Shiva allowed her. The most drastic change in this text is the absence of the self-immolation of Sati. Instead, the text mentions that she cursed her father and quit her body in a Himalayan cave. The Kalika Purana does not mention Sati going to the event, instead it is found that Sati left her body using a yogic process, after her niece, Vijaya informed her about the yajna.

=== Formation of the Shakti pithas ===
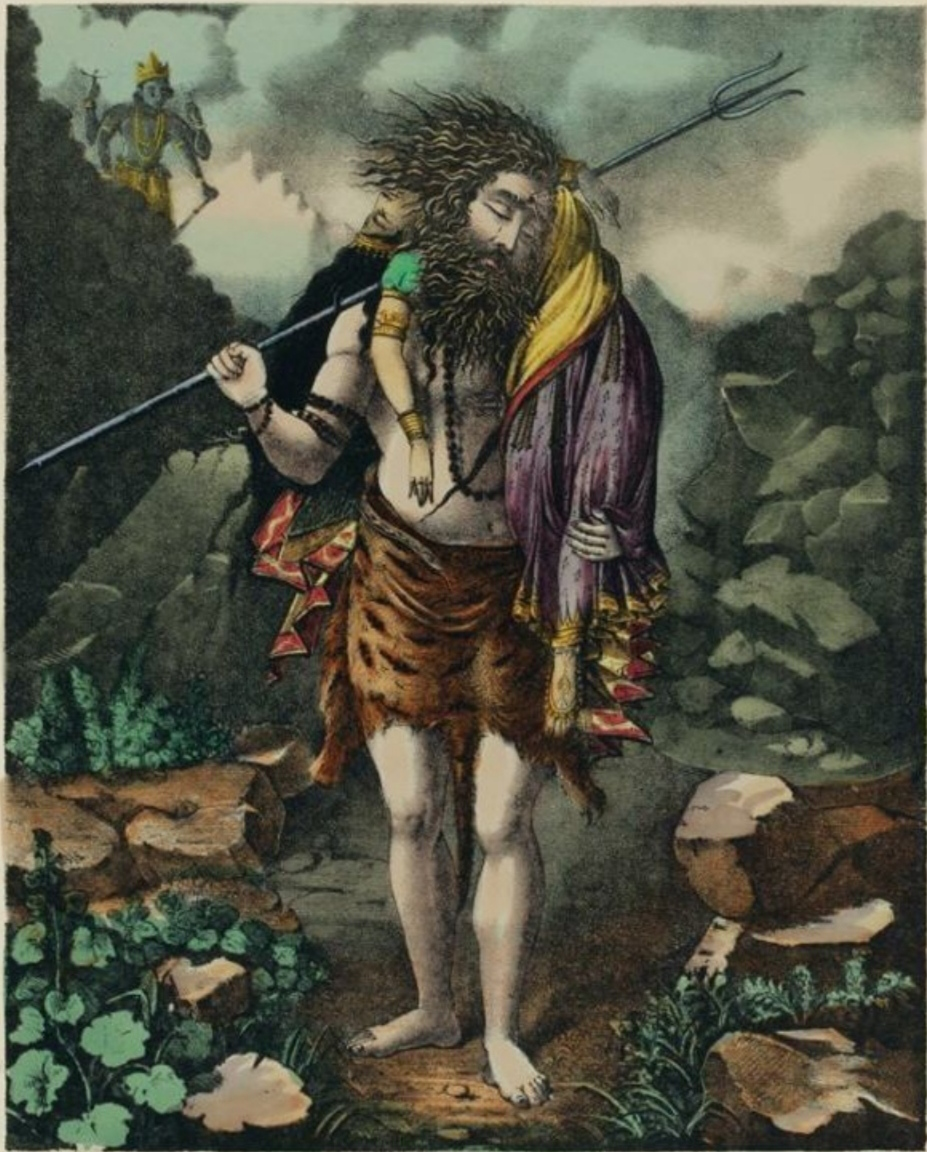
Shiva carrying Sati's corpse, followed by Vishnu's Sudharshana Chakra, 19th-century lithograph.

Another important legend associated with Sati is the formation of the Shakta pithas. Shakta pithas are shrines of the Mother Goddess, believed to have enshrined with the presence of Shakti due to the falling of body parts of the corpse of Sati. It is believed that an enraged Shiva performed the Tandava dance with Sati's charred body, which led her body to come apart and the pieces fell at different places on earth. In a more detailed narration found in some texts, Shiva, crazed with grief, roamed with Sati's corpse throughout the universe, causing universal imbalance. The divinities called upon the god Vishnu to restore Shiva to normalcy and calm. Vishnu used his Sudarshana Chakra (discus weapon) to dismember Sati's cadaver, following which Shiva regained his equanimity.

The legend ends with Sati's body being dismembered into many pieces which fell on earth at various places. Several different listings of these holy places, known as Shakta pithas, are available; some of these places have become major centres of pilgrimage as they are held by the Goddess-oriented Shakta sect to be particularly holy. Besides main Shakta pithas, some small peethas like Bindudham came into existence which are due to Sati's fallen blood drops.

=== Rebirth ===
A depressed Shiva returned to his ascetic world while Sati was reborn as Parvati the daughter of Himavat, king of the mountains and personification of the Himalayas, and his wife, Mena. Himavan respected Shiva ardently. Consequently, Parvati like Sati, won Shiva over by her penance and married him.

== Legacy and worship ==
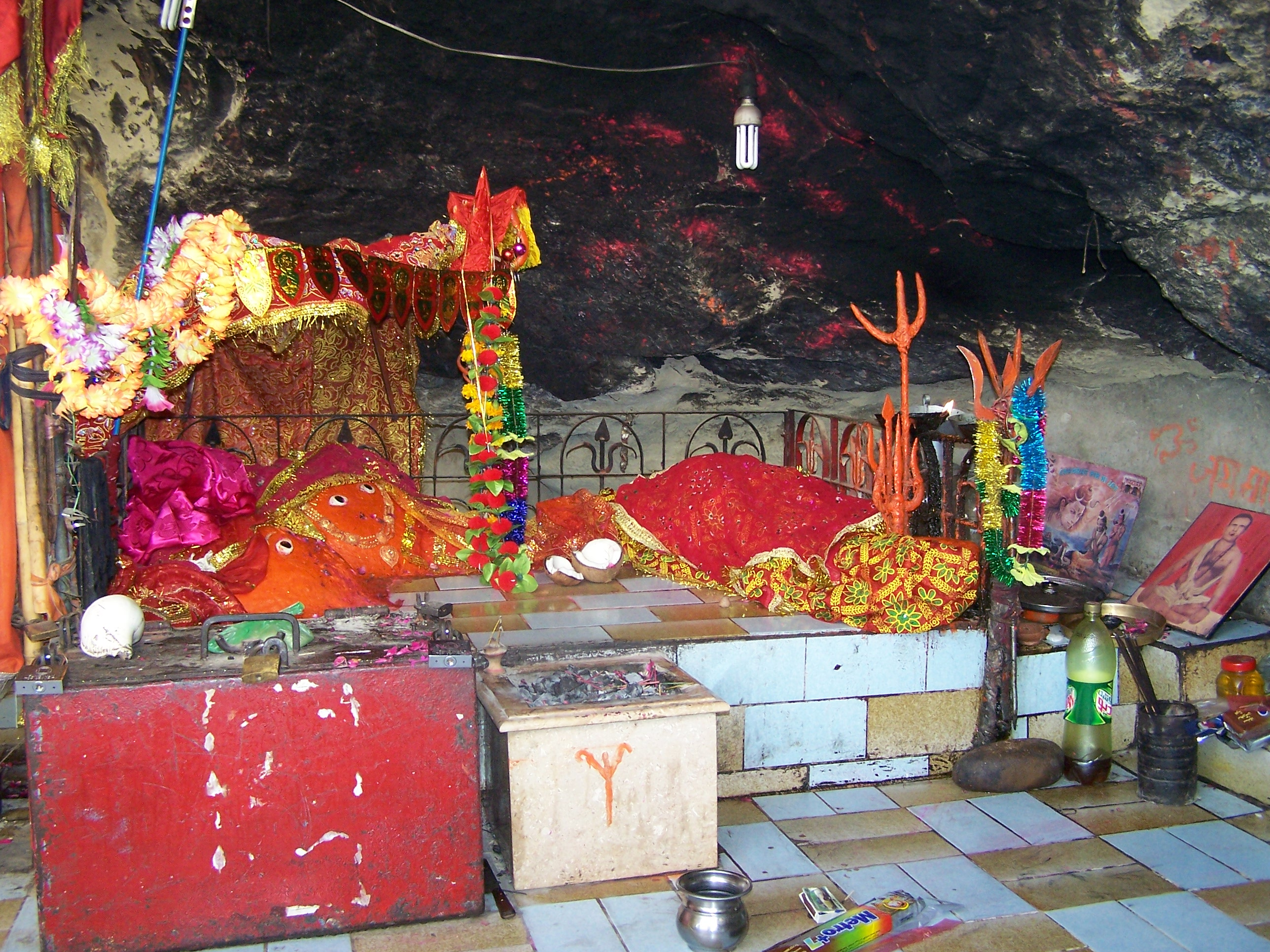
Hinglaj Mata Temple is the largest Hindu pilgrimage centre in Pakistan. The annual Hinglaj Yatra is attended by more than 250,000 people.

The legend of Daksha Yajna and Sati's self-immolation had immense significance in shaping the ancient Sanskrit literature and even had impact on the culture of India. It led to the development of the concept of Shakta pithas and there by strengthening Shaktism. Many stories in Puranas took the Daksha yajna as the reason for its origin. It is an important incident in Shaivism resulting in the emergence of goddess Parvati in the place of Sati and making Shiva a grihastashrami (house holder) leading to the origin of Ganesha and Kartikeya.

There are very few shrines in India dedicated to Sati Devi, and Kottiyoor is one of them. The ancient Kottiyoor temple in Kottiyoor, Kannur, Kerala, is one of the only places in India where Goddess Sati is worshiped as she is. Next to temple's Svayambhu Linga is the Ammarakallu(അമ്മാറക്കല്ല്), a raised platform with a natural rock structure surrounded by a circular stone boundary, with a brass lamp placed under a traditional palm leaf umbrella. It is believed to be where the goddess immolated herself during the Daksha Yajna. During the sri bali (a temple ritual consisting of "offering food to the members of the [deity's] retinue"), the goddess's thidambu (the decorated replica of the deity in a temple that is usually taken outside for the purposes like festivals and poojas) is taken to the Ammarakallu in a procession. The Goddess is also venerated during the famed Kottiyooor Vyshaka Mahotsavam. The Ammarakallu has also come to be associated with the Goddess Parvati, thereby representing both incarnations of the Goddess.

== See also ==
- Sati Savitri: And Other Feminist Stories They Don't Tell You

== Bibliography ==
- Kinsley, David (1998). Hindu Goddesses: Visions of the Divine Feminine in the Hindu Religious Tradition. Motilal Banarsidass Publ. ISBN 978-81-208-0394-7.
- Mittal, Sushil; Thursby, Gene (2009-01-19). Studying Hinduism: Key Concepts and Methods. Routledge. ISBN 978-1-134-41829-9.
- Mani, Vettam (1975). Puranic encyclopaedia : a comprehensive dictionary with special reference to the epic and Puranic literature. Robarts - University of Toronto. Delhi : Motilal Banarsidass. p. 576. ISBN 978-0-8426-0822-0.
- Dalal, Roshen (2014-04-18). Hinduism: An Alphabetical Guide. Penguin UK. ISBN 978-81-8475-277-9.
- Wilkins, William J. (1913). "Uma – Parvati". Hindu Mythology – Vedic and Puranic. Thacker Spink London.
- Klostermaier, Klaus K. (2014-10-01). Hinduism: A Short History. Simon and Schuster. ISBN 978-1-78074-680-7.
- Bose, Mandakranta (2018-05-30). The Oxford History of Hinduism: The Goddess. Oxford University Press. ISBN 978-0-19-107969-6.
- McDermott, Rachel Fell; Kripal, Jeffrey J. (2003-05-05). Encountering Kali: In the Margins, at the Center, in the West. University of California Press. ISBN 978-0-520-23240-2.
- Hiltebeitel, Alf (2011-07-27). When the Goddess was a Woman: Mahābhārata Ethnographies - Essays by Alf Hiltebeitel. BRILL. ISBN 978-90-04-19380-2.
- Gandhi, Maneka (1993). The Penguin Book of Hindu Names. Penguin Books India. ISBN 978-0-14-012841-3.
- Birkenholtz, Jessica Vantine (2018). Reciting the Goddess: Narratives of Place and the Making of Hinduism in Nepal. Oxford University Press. ISBN 978-0-19-934116-0.
- Monier-Williams, Monier (1872). A Sanskrit-English Dictionary. Clarendon.
- Gámez-Fernández, Cristina M. (2020-05-15). India in the World. Cambridge Scholars Publishing. ISBN 978-1-5275-5118-3.
- Balfour, Edward (1885). The Cyclopædia of India and of Eastern and Southern Asia: Commercial, Industrial and Scientific, Products of the Mineral, Vegetable, and Animal Kingdoms, Useful Arts and Manufactures. B. Quaritch.
- Sinha, Purnendu Narayana (2020-09-28). A Study of the Bhagavata Purana: Or, Esoteric Hinduism. Library of Alexandria. ISBN 978-1-4655-2506-2.
- Shin, Jae-Eun (2018-05-30). Change, Continuity and Complexity: The Mahāvidyās in East Indian Śākta Traditions. Routledge. ISBN 978-0-429-83102-7.
- Hawley, John Stratton; Wulff, Donna Marie (1998). Devī: Goddesses of India. Motilal Banarsidass Publ. ISBN 978-81-208-1491-2.
- Monaghan, Patricia (2010-12-31). Goddesses in World Culture. ABC-CLIO. ISBN 978-0-313-35465-6.
- Coulter, Charles Russell; Turner, Patricia (2013-07-04). Encyclopedia of Ancient Deities. Routledge. ISBN 978-1-135-96390-3.
- Shastri, J. L. (2000-01-01). Ancient Indian Tradition and Mythology Volume 1: The Siva Purana Part 1. Motilal Banarsidass. ISBN 978-81-208-3868-0.
- Sunity Devee, Maharanee (1919). Nine ideal Indian women. University of California Libraries. Calcutta : Thacker, Spink & Co.
- Mukhopadhyay, Anway (2018-04-20). The Goddess in Hindu-Tantric Traditions: Devi as Corpse. Routledge. ISBN 978-1-351-06352-4.
- Shimkhada, Deepak; Herman, Phyllis K. (2009-03-26). The Constant and Changing Faces of the Goddess: Goddess Traditions of Asia. Cambridge Scholars Publishing. ISBN 978-1-4438-0702-9.
- Kramrisch, Stella (1988). The Presence of Siva. Motilal Banarsidass Publ. ISBN 978-81-208-0491-3.
- Dehejia, Harsha V. (1999). Parvati: Goddess of Love. Mapin Publishing Pvt Ltd. ISBN 978-81-85822-59-4.
- Pintchman, Tracy (2015-04-08). Rise of the Goddess in the Hindu Tradition, The. State University of New York Press. ISBN 978-1-4384-1618-2.
- Michaels, Axel (2004). Hinduism: Past and Present. Princeton University Press. ISBN 978-0-691-08952-2.
- Ph.D, James G. Lochtefeld (2001-12-15). The Illustrated Encyclopedia of Hinduism, Volume 2. The Rosen Publishing Group, Inc. ISBN 978-0-8239-3180-4.
- Jones, Constance; Ryan, James D. (2006). Encyclopedia of Hinduism. Infobase Publishing. ISBN 978-0-8160-7564-5.
