= Outline of Tripura =

Overview of and topical guide to Tripura

Location of Tripura

The following outline is provided as an overview of and topical guide to Tripura:

Tripura – state in Northeast India. The third-smallest state in the country, it covers 10,491 km2 (4,051 sq mi) and is bordered by Bangladesh (East Bengal) to the north, south, and west, and the Indian states of Assam and Mizoram to the east. The Bengali Hindu people form the ethno-linguistic majority in Tripura.

Seal of Tripura

== General reference ==
=== Names ===
- Common English name: Tripura
  - Pronunciation: /ˈtrɪpuːrɑː/
- Official English name(s): Tripura
- Nickname(s):
- Adjectival(s)
  - Tripuri
  - Tripuran
- Demonym(s)
  - Tripuris
  - Tripurans

=== Rankings (amongst India's states) ===
- by population: 22nd
- by area (2011 census): 27th
- by crime rate (2015): 25th
- by gross domestic product (GDP) (2014): 23rd
- by Human Development Index (HDI):
- by life expectancy at birth:
- by literacy rate:

== Geography of Tripura ==
Geography of Tripura

- Tripura is: an Indian state, and one of the Seven Sister States
- Population of Tripura: 3,671,032 (2011)
- Area of Tripura: 10,491.69 km^{2} (4,050.86 sq mi)
- Atlas of Tripura

=== Location of Tripura ===
- Tripura is situated within the following regions:
  - Northern Hemisphere
  - Eastern Hemisphere
    - Eurasia
      - Asia
        - South Asia
          - India
            - Northeastern India
              - Seven Sister States
- Time zone: Indian Standard Time (UTC+05:30)

=== Environment of Tripura ===
==== Natural geographic features of Tripura ====
- Highest point: Betlingchhip

=== Regions of Tripura ===
==== Administrative divisions of Tripura ====
===== Districts of Tripura =====
Districts of Tripura

- Dhalai district
- Gomati district
- Khowai district
- North Tripura district
- Sepahijala district
- South Tripura district
- Unakoti district
- West Tripura district

===== Municipalities of Tripura =====
- Cities of Tripura
  - Capital of Tripura: Agartala
  - Amarpur, Tripura
  - Dhalai
  - Khowai
  - Teliamura
  - Unakoti

=== Demography of Tripura ===
Demographics of Tripura

== Government and politics of Tripura ==
Politics of Tripura

- Form of government: Indian state government (parliamentary system of representative democracy)
- Capital of Tripura: Agartala
- Elections in Tripura
- Tripura Tribal Areas Autonomous District Council (TTAADC)

=== Union government in Tripura ===
- Rajya Sabha members from Tripura
- Tripura Pradesh Congress Committee
- Indian general election, 2009 (Tripura)
- Indian general election, 2014 (Tripura)

=== Branches of the government of Tripura ===
Government of Tripura

==== Executive branch of the government of Tripura ====
- Head of state: Governor of Tripura,
- Head of government: Chief Minister of Tripura,

==== Legislative branch of the government of Tripura ====
Tripura Legislative Assembly

=== Law and order in Tripura ===
- Law enforcement in Tripura
  - Tripura Police

== History of Tripura ==
History of Tripura

=== History of Tripura, by period ===
- Twipra Kingdom
- Tripura (princely state)
- Manikya Dynasty
- Tripuri Kings

== Culture of Tripura ==
Culture of Tripura

- Architecture of Tripura
- Cuisine of Tripura
  - Tripuri cuisine
- Tripuri dress
- Languages of Tripura
  - Kokborok language
  - Kokborok literature
- Monuments in Tripura
  - Monuments of National Importance in Tripura
  - State Protected Monuments in Tripura
- World Heritage Sites in Tripura

=== Art in Tripura ===
- Tripuri dances
- Music of Tripura
  - Musical instruments of Tripura

=== People of Tripura ===
- People from Tripura

=== Religion in Tripura ===
Religion in Tripura

- Christianity in Tripura

=== Sports in Tripura ===
Sports in Tripura

- Cricket in Tripura
  - Tripura Cricket Association
  - Tripura cricket team
- Football in Tripura
  - Tripura Football Association
  - Tripura football team

=== Symbols of Tripura ===
Symbols of Tripura

- State animal:
- State bird:
- State flower:
- State seal: Seal of Tripura
- State tree:

== Economy and infrastructure of Tripura ==
- Tourism in Tripura

== Education in Tripura ==
Education in Tripura

- Institutions of higher education in Tripura

== Health in Tripura ==
Health in Tripura

- Healthcare

== See also ==
- Outline of India
