= Tourism in Tripura =

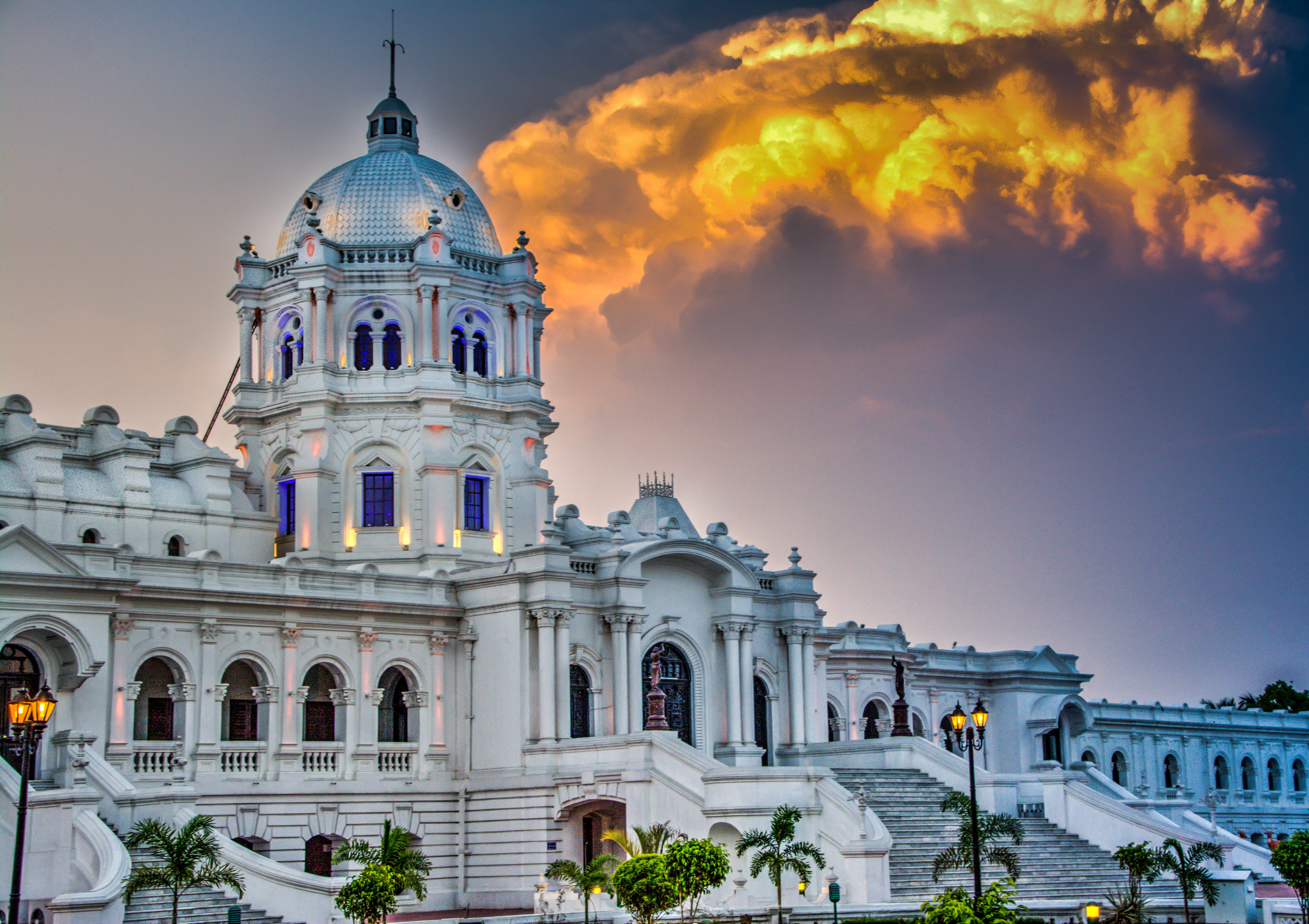
Ujjayanta Palace former royal palace of Twipra Kingdom

Tripura is a state located in North-East India and the third smallest state in India by size. Tripura is widely regarded as a beautiful destination, appreciated for its picturesque landscape and delightful climate. The tourism in Tripura is maintained by TTDCL, a state government owned enterprise.

Tripura shares its border with Assam and Mizoram. It also a border with Bangladesh.

Currently Sourav Ganguly former captain of the Indian Cricket Team serves as the brand ambassador of Tripura Tourism.

== Ancient Hindu sites ==
- Chabimura, 15th-16th century Hindu rock carvings
- Unakoti, 7th-9th century Hindu rock carvings

== Major attractions by place ==
=== Agartala ===
Agartala is the capital and the largest city of the Indian state of Tripura, Located on the banks of the Haora River.

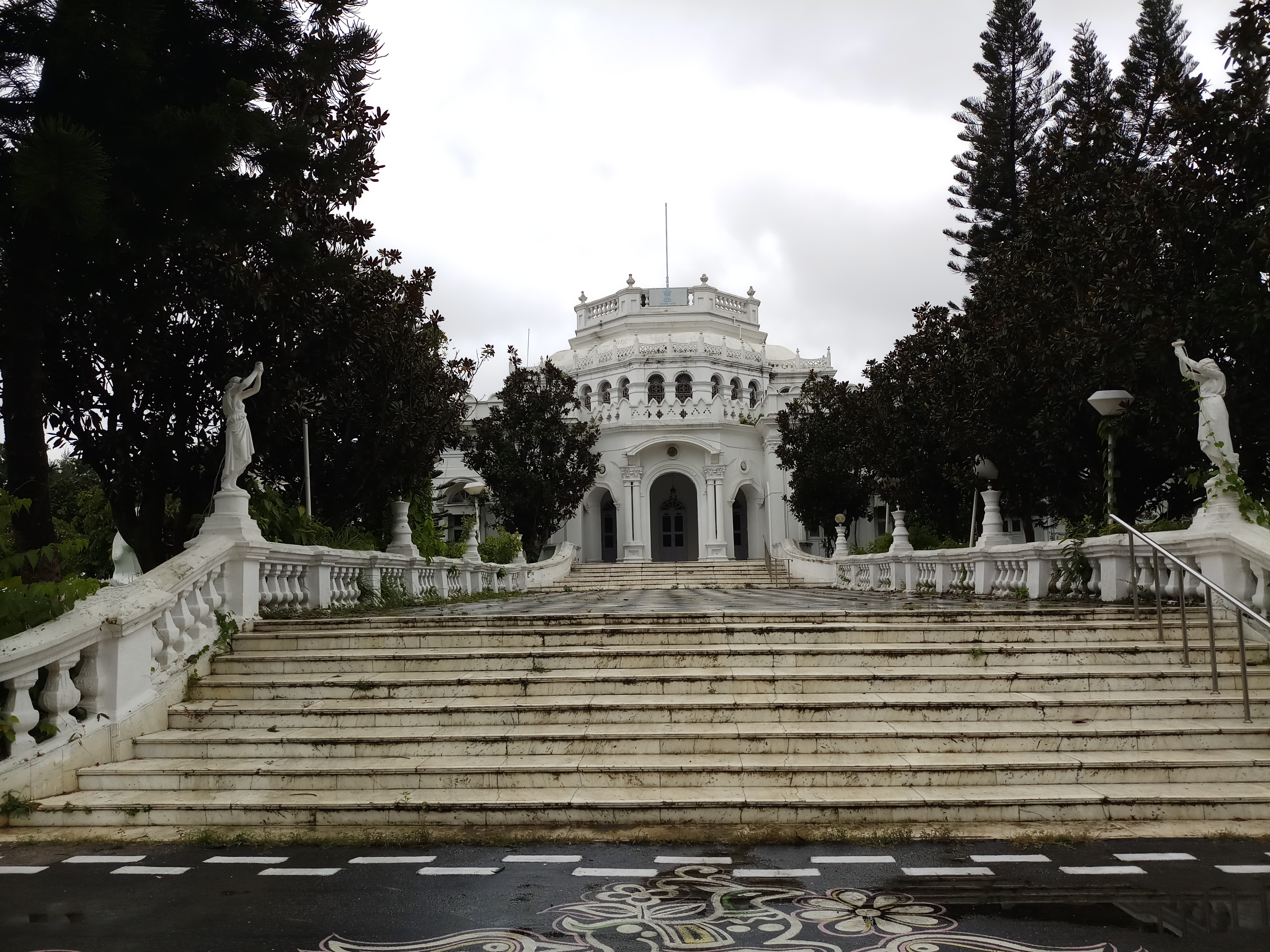
Pushpabanta Palace

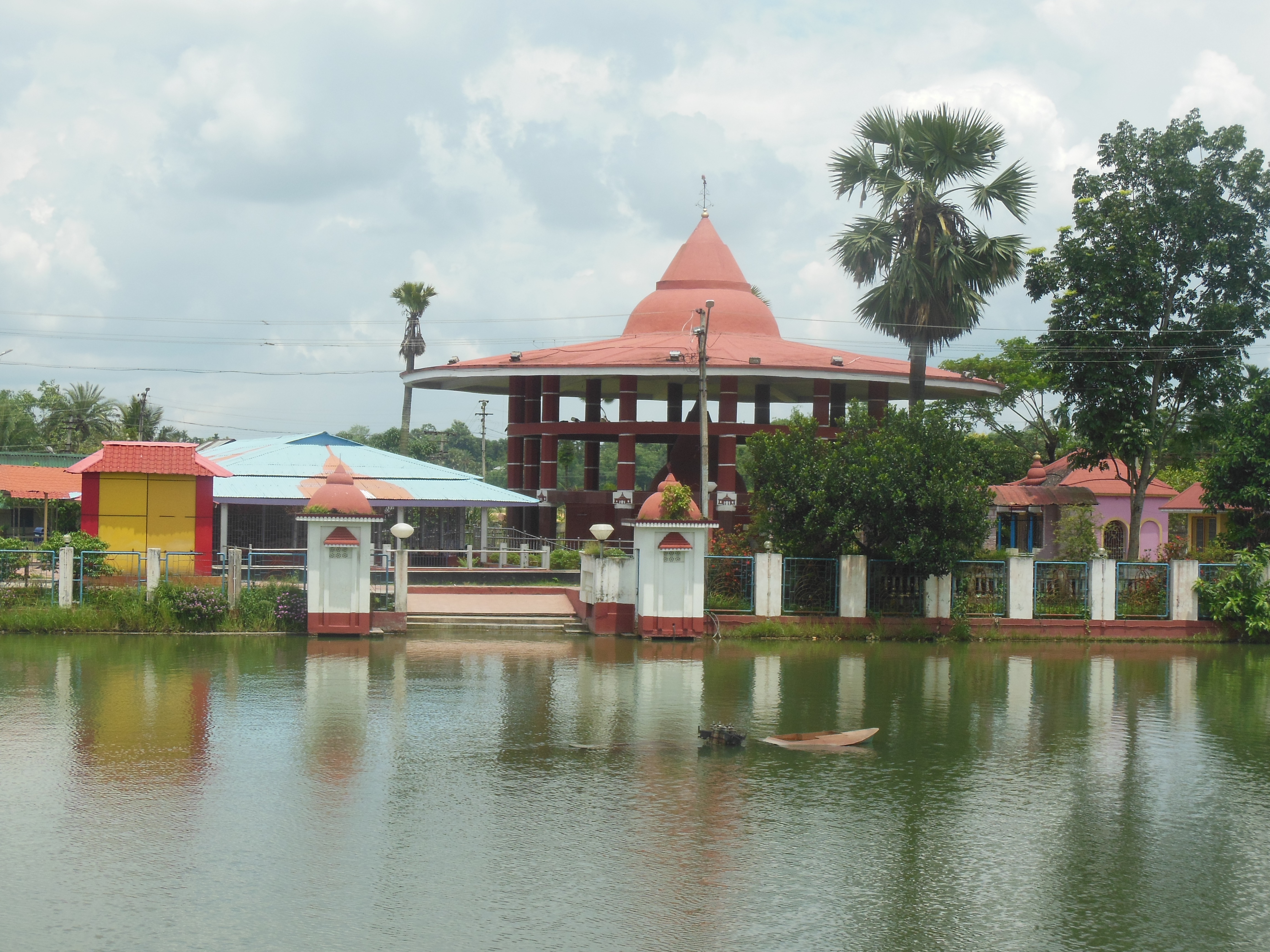
Chaturdasha Temple

Surroundings important locations are:

- Ujjayanta Palace: Former royal palace of the Tripura kings, was converted to state legislative assembly and now into a museum, situated in the area of Palace Compound is one of the eye catching attraction in the state. Built by Maharaja Radha Kishore Manikya.
- Pushbanta Palace: One of former royal palace of Tripura, it was the Raj Bhavan of Tripura till 2018 and later converted as national level cultural museum. Built by Maharaja Birendra Kishore Manikya in 1917.
- Unakoti Rock Cut Temple: Dedicated to Lord shiva, has 99,99,999 rock cut idols.
- Albert Ekka Park: The park is named after Albert Ekka, the Indian Army soldier who saved Agartala in 1971 when Pakistani forces targeted the Indian state capital. Single-handedly, he silenced two enemy machine guns, securing the freedom of the city.
- Jagannath Mandir: A Hindu temple dedicated to Hindu God Jagannath, Balabhadra and Subhadra.
- Agartala Durga Bari: A Hindu temple dedicated to Durga.
- Lakshmi Narayan Temple: A Hindu temple dedicated to lord Lakshmi Narayana and Vishnu.
- Chaturdasha Temple: This temple was built in honour of fourteen deities, together called the Chaturdasha Devata, situated in Old Agartala.
- Ramakrishna Mission, Agartala
- Heritage Park
- Rabindra Kanan
- Durgabari Tea Garden: It is located in close proximity to the capital city Agartala and spans across an extensive area. This garden serves as a thriving symbol of the state's rich tea heritage.

=== Khumulwng ===
Khumulwng is the head-quarter and the largest city of Tripura Tribal Areas Autonomous District Council. It is located around 18 km from Agartala.

- Khumulwng Eco Park: This park has been established amidst the embrace of nature, spanning across a 14.5-hectare expanse of land.
- Khumulwng Museum and Heritage Centre: It serves as a repository for the indigenous Tiprasa culture and folk art, featuring collections of rare costumes and ornaments of 19 (nineteen) tribal community of Tripura, crafts, instruments, and paintings.

=== Teliamura ===
There are two notable destination in Teliamura Sub-division.

- Montang Valley: It is known for its floating clouds and scenic beauty.
- Baramura Eco Park: It is renowned for its rich biodiversity and preservation of oriented pied hornbills. The park is located in the lap of Baramura.

=== Sepahijala ===
- Neermahal: A largest water palace in India. It is a former royal palace of Twipra Kingdom, built by Maharaja Bir Bikram Kishore Manikya in 1930. The palace is located amidst the scenic surroundings of Rudrasagar Lake.
- Sepahijala Wildlife Sanctuary: It is considered one of the finest wildlife sanctuaries in Tripura, spanning approximately 18.53 square kilometers in area.
- Kasbeswari Kali Temple: A hindu temple dedicated to Goddess Kali. This temple was built by Maharaja Dhanya Manikya It is located beside the international border of Bangladesh. The Kamalasagar Lake is in front of this temple.
- Buddhist Stupa: This site is situated in Boxanagar.

=== Gomati ===
- Tripura Sundari Temple: It is a Hindu temple of the Goddess Tripura Sundari. This temple situated in ancient city of Udaipur. The temple built by Maharaja Dhanya Manikya.
- Bhubaneswari Temple: Located about 55 km from Agartala on the bank of Gomati river. This hindu temple dedicated to Goddess Bhuvanesvari. This temple was built by Maharaja Govinda Manikya.
- Chabimura: Chabimura is famous for its panels of rock carvings on the steep mountain wall on the bank of Gomati. There are huge carved images of Shiva, Vishnu, Kartika, Mahisasura Mardini Durga and other Gods and Goddesses.

=== South Tripura ===
- Pilak: 12th century Hindu-Buddhist archaeological site preserved by Archaeological Survey of India.
- Trishna Wildlife Sanctuary: Indian gaur (bison) is an attraction of the sanctuary.
- Bharat-Bangladesh Maitri Udyan: Memorial park of 1971 Bangladesh Liberation War developed by Government of Tripura.
- Dhananjoy Tripura Smriti Park: The park was constructed in the memorial of Dhananjay Tripura, who was the martyr of Kokborok language movement.
- Maitri Setu: Bridge on Feni River which connects India with Bangladesh.

== Transportation ==
Arriving by Air: The Maharaja Bir Bikram International Airport is well-connected to major cities in India. Taxi services, including Uber, and auto-rickshaws are available at airports for transfers to the city.

Arriving by Train: Tripura is connected through the North East Frontier Railway, with only one route linking it to nodal stations in other parts of the country. Agartala railway station is the largest railway station of Tripura, is served by direct trains to New Delhi, Kolkata, Mumbai, Bengaluru.

Road: The Tripura Road Transport Corporation alongside various private companies, there are bus and taxi services that operate, connecting Agartala with Guwahati, Shillong, and Aizawl. Agartala is linked by regular bus services with Bangladesh, making it more convenient for foreign nationals to enter Tripura via Bangladesh.

== See also ==
- Tourism in India
