= Basudev Than =

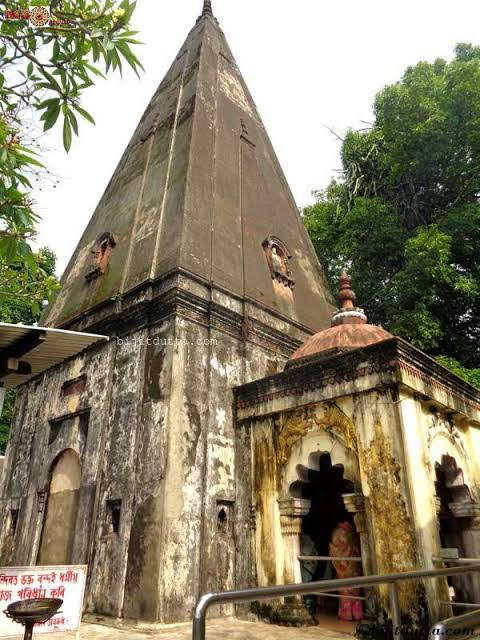
- Basudev Than

Religion
- Affiliation: Hinduism
- District: Lakhimpur district
- Deity: Vishnu
- Festivals: Palnaam, Doul Utsav, Raas Mahotsav

Location
- Location: Dhakuakhana
- State: Assam
- Country: India
- Interactive map of Basudev Than
- Coordinates: 27°21′42″N 94°33′48″E

Architecture
- Creator: King Satyanarayan
- Established: 1392 CE

Website
- Sri Sri Basudev Than

Basudev Than (pronounced as [baxudew tʱan]) or Narua Satra is a satra located in Dhakuakhana, Lakhimpur, Assam. It was first established in the 14th century by the Chutia king Satyanarayan. Originally known as Laumura Satra, this satra is well known in Assam and other parts of India.

== Etymology ==
The plot of the Basudev Than which was originally donated by Chutia king Satyanarayan was transferred to many people many times. Damodar Ata restablished the Than as a Satra in the 17th century and named it Laumura Satra. The plot, which was donated by Ahom king Jayadhaj Singha, was transferred to many other people over time. This led to the name Na-rua. Na means "Not", "rua" means "to stay" which translates to Not-to-Stay.

== Legends ==
According to the legend constructed in the 16th-century poem Rukmimi-harana by Srimanta Sankardev, Rukmini made the statue of Basudev/Krishna for her desire to marry him.

== History ==
Although the original temple was built in the 14th-15th century during the rule of Chutia kings Lakshminarayan and Satyanarayan, it was shifted to the present location in the mid-17th century by the grandson of Sankardeva, Damodar Ata, as Laumura Satra, during the rule of Ahom king Jayadhwaj Singha. There is controversy whether Damodar Ata came from Bijani or from Upper Assam.

The land of the Satra (where it was originally located) was donated by the Chutia king of Sadhayapura (Sadiya), Satyanarayana, in 1392 CE to a Brahmin named "Narayan Dwij" for Vishnu Puja. Later, a Brahmin family took possession of the land, and finally, a member of that family, 'Bahude', gave it to Damodar Ata in the 17th century. According to others, in 1401 CE, Sadhayapuriya/Sadiya Chutia king Lakshminarayan devoted the land to Ravidev Dwij for Vishnu Puja. Over time, the temple was handed over to a priest named Ravidhar Vanaspati, whose descendant, Bahude, finally gave the site to the Vaishnavite saint Damodardev Ata to establish the Satra in the 17th century. There is an old Bihu geet regarding the Than,

Ujai Norua Bhatiyay Bardua
Majote Basudevar Than
Lagoni Birikh oi Lagiboloi napale
Musukai bhangile daal

This shows that the Narua Satra and Basudev Than were distinct places of worship at that period. After Damodar Ata's death, Ramakanta Ata took the place of the Adhikar. However, having to look after two other Satras as well, Basudev Than, due to neglect, almost turned into a forest. In 1683, Ramdev Ata took the place of the Adhikar after the death of Ramakanta Ata. From then on, the temple and the satra merged, and it was known as Narua Satra. During this time, the temple was finally transferred to the present-day location. By that time, the Ahom kings started to pay respect to the Satradhikars. In 1707, Ahom king Gourinath Singha decided to visit this satra. However, he had to return from a place now called Uvata Sampara (Uvata meaning 'to return'). Knowing this, Satradhikar felt sorry, left this satra and went to live in Barpeta. Later on, when the king came to know of this, he regretted it and sent Mahidhar Dangariya there and bestowed a Bor-Kah. Gradually, this place became deserted. This remained so till the arrival of Rangain Aldhara. Later on, Achyut Ata, with the help of Aldhara, established a temple there. The Basudev Mandir was established on 'Maghi Purnima'. And thus, people have been organising Pal Nam every year on Maghi Purnima to date. His brother, Mahesh Ata, built a big Namghar there. Over the years, priests like Rupendra Dev Goswami and Bhupendra Dev Goswami have taken charge of the temple. According to the copper plate inscriptions found in Dhakuakhana, the statues of the former temple included Basudev, Amba and Ganesha. During the days of Damodardev, another statue of Basudev carved out of black stone is said to have been transferred from Kundil in Sadiya, which was the capital of the Chutia kingdom. According to the manuscript Thakur Charita, a statue carved out of black stone was transferred from Sadiya during the rule of the Ahom king Jayadhwaj Singha and established in the Noruwa Satra. The statue is about 4 feet in length. The Thakur Charita says,

Kundil nagar hitu ati anupom
Bohu bhumi britti dibu tahar logot”

Meaning: There is a beautiful idol of Vasudev in Kundil Nagar. The king installed this idol and donated lands and property along with the idol. This indicates that the Satra and the temple merged during the 17th century to form the Basudev Narua Satra. The other statues and artefacts found in the temple date back to 1392 when it was established by the Chutia kings.

== Access ==
The Lakhimpur railway station is the nearest railway station, and Lilabari Airport is the nearest airport. It is 10 km away from Dhakuakhana town.

== See also ==
- Hindu pilgrimage sites
  - Chabimura, 15th-16th century Hindu rock carvings
  - Unakoti, 7th-9th century Hindu rock carvings
- Shaktipeetha: there are 3 Shaktipeetha in Northeast
  - Assam's Kamakhya Temple Shaktipeetha in Guwahati
  - Meghalaya's Nartiang Durga Temple Shaktipeetha and 600-year-old temple
  - Tripura's Tripura Sundari Temple Shaktipeetha
- Tourism in Northeast India
