= Devtamura =

Hill in Tripura

Devtamura (or Debtamura) is a hill range in South Tripura district of Tripura, India. It is known for an archaeological site of rock sculptures, a panel of carved images of Hindu deities of Durga, Ganesha and Kartikeya on the bank of Gomati River. The stone images are estimated to have curved during the 15/16th century.

== Geography ==
Devtamura is 85 kilometres (53 mi) in length and is situated at an altitude of 229 metres (751 ft) above sea level. It is situated in between Udaipur and Amarpur. Damburu Falls commences at the top of Devtamura, continuing through a series of terraces.

The approach to the site is only by boat a three-hour journey from Amarpur to Udaipur to the forest area of the site; the total distance of travel from Agartala is 75 km

== Archaeological site ==
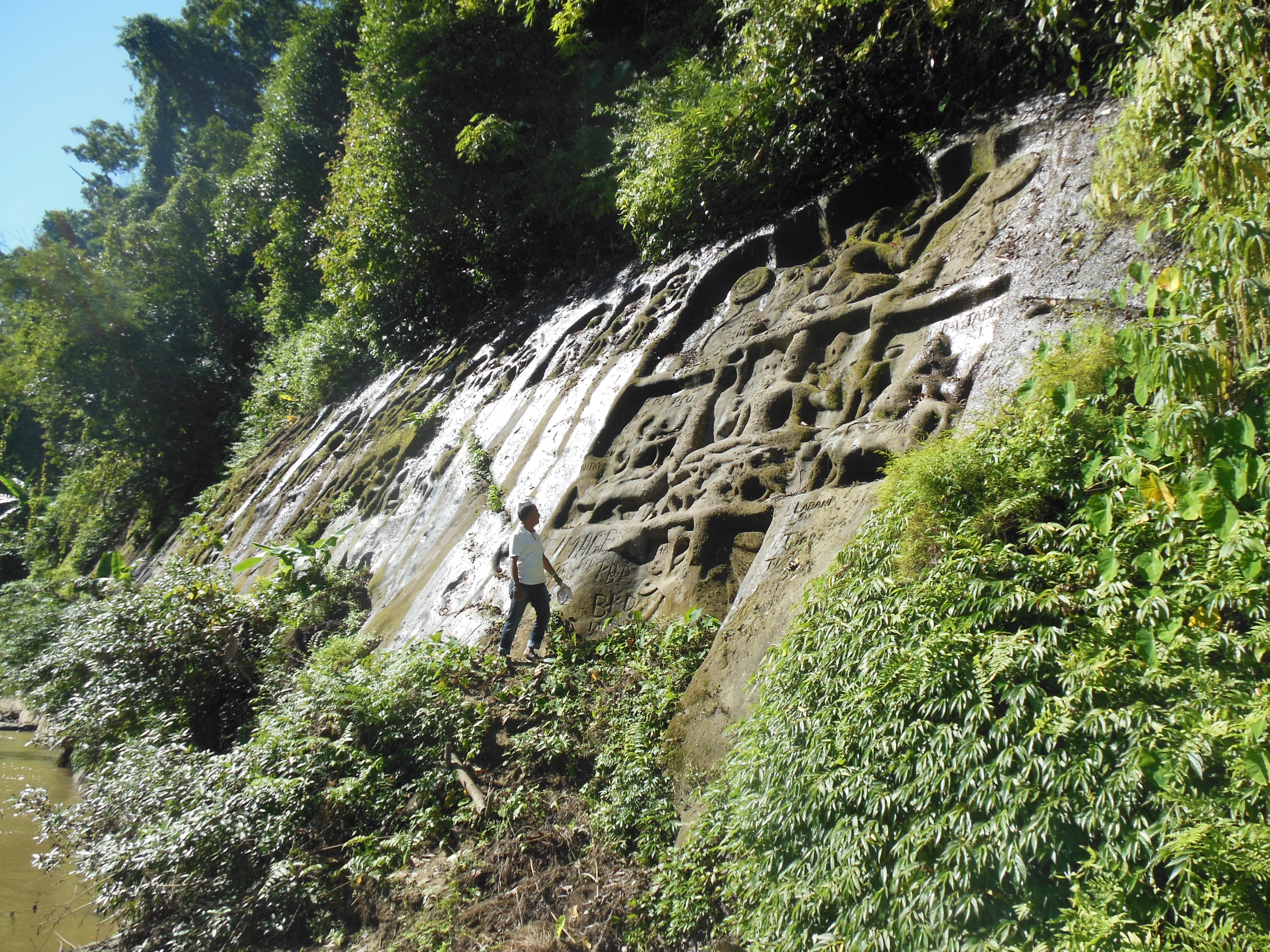
A carving at Chabimura

Chabimura, the archaeological site at Devtamura, dates to the fifteenth or sixteenth centuries. The site includes colossal carvings of the image of Devi Chakrakma. The purpose of the carvings, and the artists who carved them are unknown. The statues are carved on the steep sloping rock exposures of the Kalajhari Hills which drains into the Gomti River. There are in all 37 rock cut images which also include images of Ganesha, Kartikeya, Mahishasuramardini, Durga and many others.

Each year in mid-January, a fair occurs at the third terrace from the top of the falls, at a time when local tribal members take a holy bath in Gomati River.
