= Bijoy Sagar =

Lake in India

Bijoy sagar
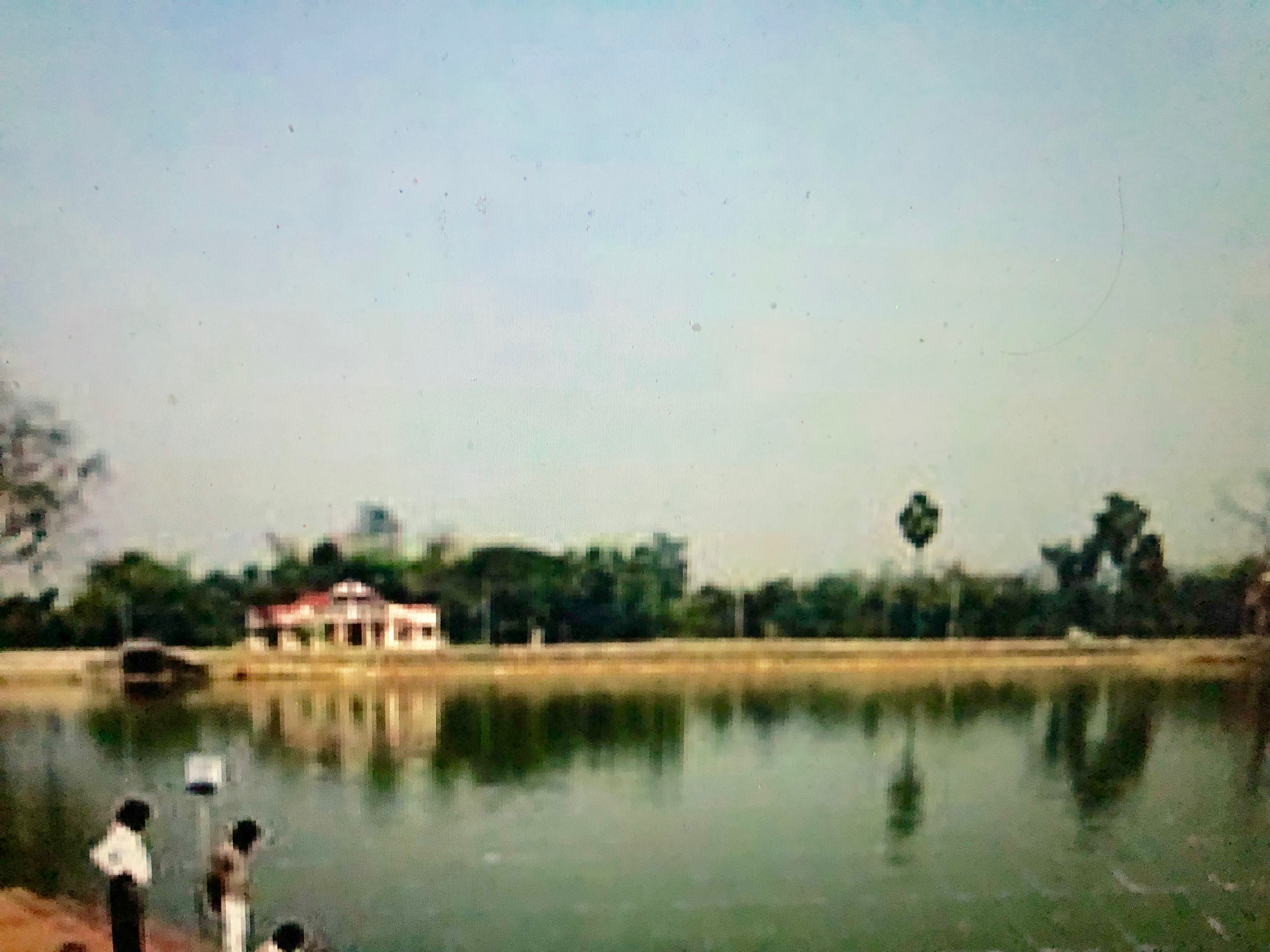
- Bijoy Sagar

- Location of Bijoy Sagar Bijoy sagar (India)
- Location: Tripura, India
- Coordinates: 23.538°N 91.499°E
- Type: Lake

Bijoy Sagar is a lake in Udaipur in North-East India. It is also called Mahadeb Dighi. It is one of the largest lakes in Udaipur in Tripura. The lake is 750 feet in length and 450 feet in breadth. The area around the lake is densely settled. The lake is contaminated with domestic sewage and waste water through one drain located on the north-eastern side. The population depends on Bijoy Sagar for bathing, washing, fishery etc. Also solid waste by the surrounding households area also vacated into the Mahadev Dighi. It is also alternatively spelt as Bejoy Sagar.

== History ==
The lake was dug during the intermediary period between Dhanya Manikya and Govinda Manikya's reign. The lake was measured during the reign of Bir Bikram Kishore Manikya.

King Jhujaroofa of Tripura defeated the Mog dynasty and captured Rangamati and established his new capital at Udaipur in the middle of year 590 AD. His descendants changed their name to Manikya and constructed several temples in Udaipur such as Tripurasundari temple, Bhubaneswari temple, Gunabati Mandir, Shiva temple, Jagannath temple, Gopinath temple, Badarsahed Bari, and Dutia Mandir. During this phase several lakes like Amarsagar, Jagannath Dighi, Dhanisagar (Dhanya Sagar) and Bijoy Sagar (Mahadeb Dighi) were dug to add beauty to the city of lakes and temples. Udaipur also previously known as Rangmati ceased to be the capital of Tripura in the 19th century.

== Important Institutions ==
Netaji Subhash Mahavidyalaya which is the first college of Tripura is situated on the banks of Bijoy Sagar. The college began its journey in 1964 and in 1977 the Government of Tripura allotted a plot of land by the banks of the lake to permanently house the college.

Temple of Tripureswar is also located on the banks of Bijoy Sagar/Mahadeb Dighi.

There are rock cut images of two lions installed in front of Mahadev temple north of Bijoy Sagar built into the soil.

== See also ==
- Tripura
- Udaipur, Tripura
