= TRTC =

TRTC may refer to:

- Taipei Rapid Transit Corporation, which operates the Taipei Metro
- Tenant right to counsel
- Transnistrian Radio and Television Center
- Tripura Road Transport Corporation
- Turkish Radio and Television Corporation
