= Nartiang Durga Temple =

Hindu temple in India

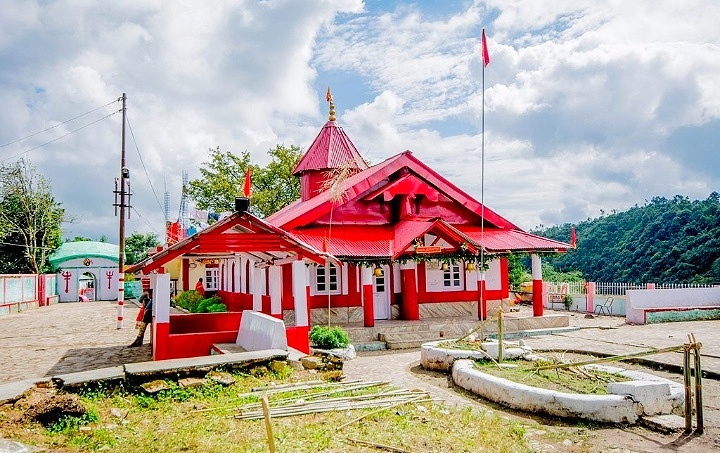
- Exterior view of the temple

- Location within Meghalaya Location within India

Religion
- Affiliation: Hinduism
- District: West Jaintia Hills district
- Deity: Durga

Location
- Location: West Jaintia Hills district
- State: Meghalaya
- Country: India
- Coordinates: 25.567°N 92.209°E

Website
- mandironline.org/ind-793150-100001/

Nartiang Durga Temple is a Hindu temple located in the West Jaintia Hills district of Meghalaya in northeastern India. It is one of the 51 Shakta pithas and is one of the holiest sites for devotees of the Shaktism sect of Hinduism. It is 600 years old. The Hindus in the Jaintia Hills believe that this temple is the permanent abode of Goddess Durga. The temple draws a large number of pilgrims from all over the country for the occasion of Durga Puja. The Shakti of Nartiang Devi shrine is worshipped as Jayanti and the Bhairava as Kamadishwar.

Close by, within walking distance, is the Shiva temple where one can see the remains of ancient cannons from the past inside the temple. At present there lies a Hindu temple in this vicinity and the priests who practice there are direct descendants of the original priests that came from Jaintiapur.

== Significance ==
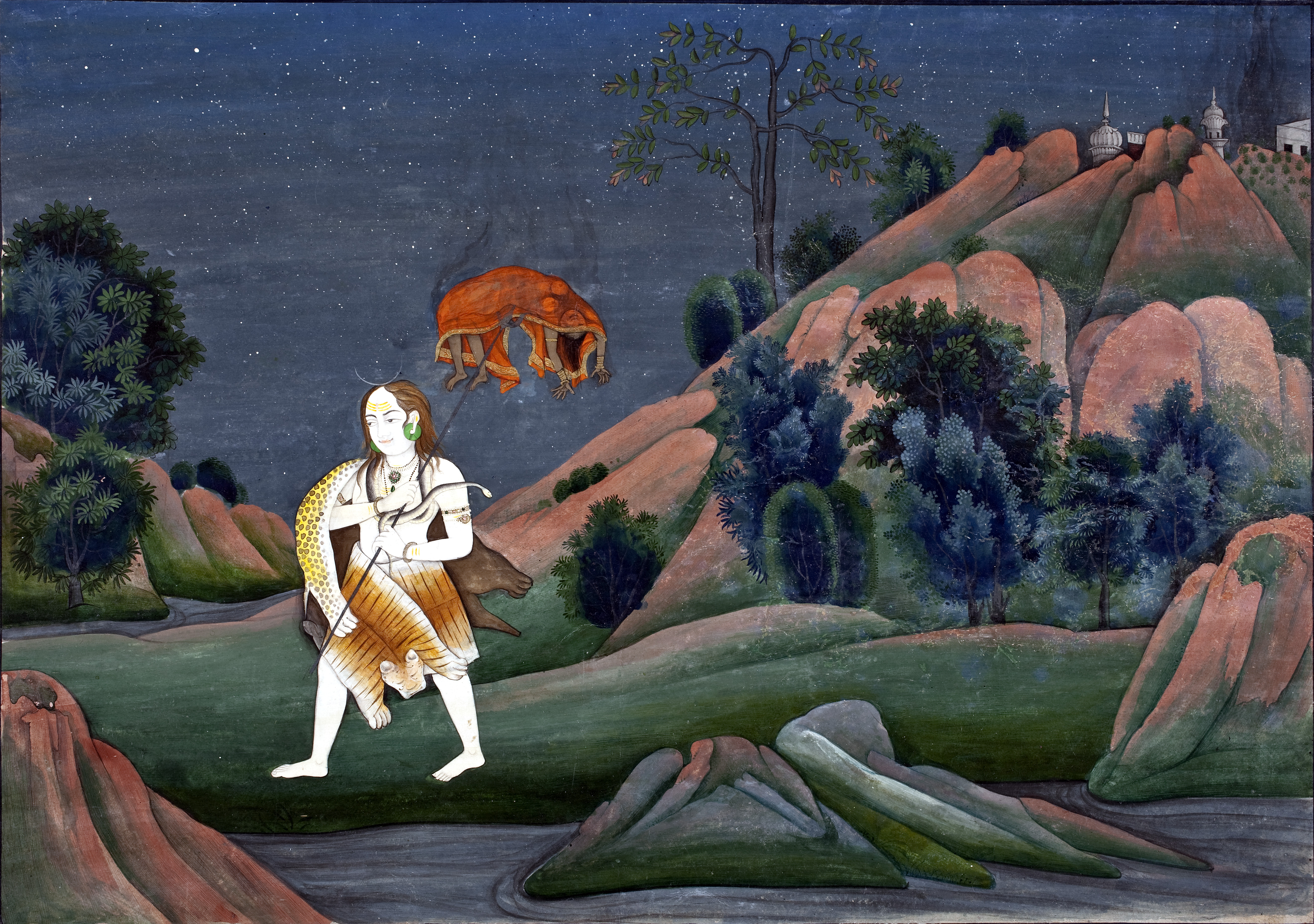
Shiva carrying the corpse of Sati Devi

The Nartiang Devi Temple is believed to be a Shakta pitha, one of the most revered shrines of Shaktism as Shakta pithas are Holy abodes of Parashakti. The Shakta pithas have originated from the mythology of Daksha yagna and Sati's self immolation Shiva carried the corpse of Sati Devi and 51 body parts of the corpse fell in the path He had wandered. Each temple has shrines for both Shakti as well as the corresponding male energy counterpart Kalabhairava. The "Shakti" of Nartiang Devi shrine is addressed as 'Jayanti' and the "Kalabhairava" as 'Kamadishwar'. It is believed that Sati Devi's left thigh had fallen there. Devi's left thigh is believed to have fallen at Nartiang in the Jaintia Hills. Hence the Goddess is known as Jainteshwari.

== History ==
Jaintia king King Dhan Manik (1596–1612) had made Nartiang the summer capital of the Jaintia Kingdom about 600 years ago. The Jaintia king Jaso Manik (1606–1641) married Lakshmi Narayana, the daughter of the Hindu Koch king Nara Narayana. It is believed that it was his wife Lakshmi Narayana who have influenced the Jaintia Royalty King Jaso Manik and his tribe to embrace Shakti sect of Hinduism as she herself was an ardent devotee of Goddess Durga.

As per a legend, one night, the goddess appeared to Jaso Manik in a dream and informed him of the significance of the place and asked him to build a temple in Her honour. Following this, the Jainteshwari temple in Nartiang was established. The strategic location of the temple and presence of weapons like cannons suggests that the temple must have been part of a fort of the Jaintia Kings.

== Worship ==
The rites at the temple are not performed the conventional way as in the plains, but in a unique way, a blend of Hindu and ancient Khasi traditions. In conformity of the Khasi custom of not using figurine images of Gods and Goddesses, the image of Durga is represented by a plantain trunk decked with marigold flowers. The local chieftain or Syiem is considered the chief patron of the temple.

Durga Puja is the most important festival of this temple. During Durga Puja, a banana plant is dressed up and worshipped as the Goddess. At the end of the four-day festivities, the plant is ceremoniously immersed in the Myntdu River. A gun salute is also given to the Goddess on the occasion. Even today, during Durga Puja, the Syiem sacrifices goats.

== At present ==
The Central Puja Committee, the official representative of the Hindu community in Meghalaya, is the caretaker of the temple. It finances a major part of the daily expenses incurred by the temple and carries out development activities in the temple premises. It is also responsible for the popularisation of the Durga Puja conducted in this ancient temple. Durga puja is done every autumn in a unique way with the fusion of the culture of Bengal and that of the Khasi-Jaintia Hills.

In 2017, the union minister Kiren Rijiju said that the temple will be declared as a heritage site.

== See also ==
- Hindu pilgrimage sites
  - Chabimura, 15th-16th century Hindu rock carvings
  - Unakoti, 7th-9th century Hindu rock carvings
- Shaktipeetha: there are 3 Shaktipeetha in Northeast
  - Assam's Kamakhya Temple Shaktipeetha in Guwahati
  - Meghalaya's Nartiang Durga Temple Shaktipeetha and 600-year-old temple
  - Tripura's Tripura Sundari Temple Shaktipeetha
- Basudev Than
- Tourism in Northeast India
