= Politics of Tripura =

Indian state politics

The politics of Tripura, a state in Northeast India, has been dominated by the Bharatiya Janata Party, the Communist Party of India (Marxist), the Indian National Congress, the Tipra Motha Party, the Indigenous People's Front of Tripura and the Trinamool Congress. As of 2020, the Bharatiya Janata Party is the ruling party in the states's legislative assembly and also won the two parliamentary constituencies in 2024 Indian general election.

== Tripura Territorial Council ==
The Tripura Territorial Council Act of 1956 opened up for direct elections to a council with the same name (TTC). The TTC had 30 directly elected members and two members nominated by the governor. The first TTC election was held in 1957, followed by fresh polls in 1959. The third council elected in February 1962 had 20 members.

== Constituencies ==
Tripura sends two representatives to the Lok Sabha (the lower house of the parliament of India) and one representative to the Rajya Sabha (parliament's upper house). Panchayats (local self-governments) elected by local body elections are present in many villages for self-governance. Tripura also has a unique tribal self-governance body, the Tripura Tribal Areas Autonomous District Council. This council is responsible for some aspects of local governance in 527 villages with high density of the scheduled tribes. The state has 60 assembly constituencies, as of 2018.

== Election result ==
The main political parties are the Bharatiya Janata Party (BJP), the Left Front, the Indian National Congress, the All India Trinamool Congress and the Tipra Motha Party along with regional parties like TMP and IPFT. Until 1977, the state was governed by the Indian National Congress. The Left Front was in power from 1978 to 1988, and then again from 1993 to 2018. During 1988–1993, the Congress and Tripura Upajati Juba Samiti were in a ruling coalition. In the 2013 Tripura Legislative Assembly election, the Left Front won 50 out of 60 seats in the Assembly. In 2014 Indian general election, both parliament seats in Tripura were won by the Communist Party of India (Marxist). The 2018 assembly election resulted in loss for the Left Front. The Bharatiya Janata Party won an overall majority in the state, resulting in the end of the Communist Party's uninterrupted twenty-five year rule. BJP won 44 out of 60 seats in the Assembly by coalition with IPFT. Communist Party of India (Marxist) only got 16 seats and Indian National Congress lost by huge margins in all constituencies. The 2023 assembly election resulted in re-election of the BJP government which won an absolute majority.
