= Chaturdasha Temple =

Hindu temple in Tripura, India

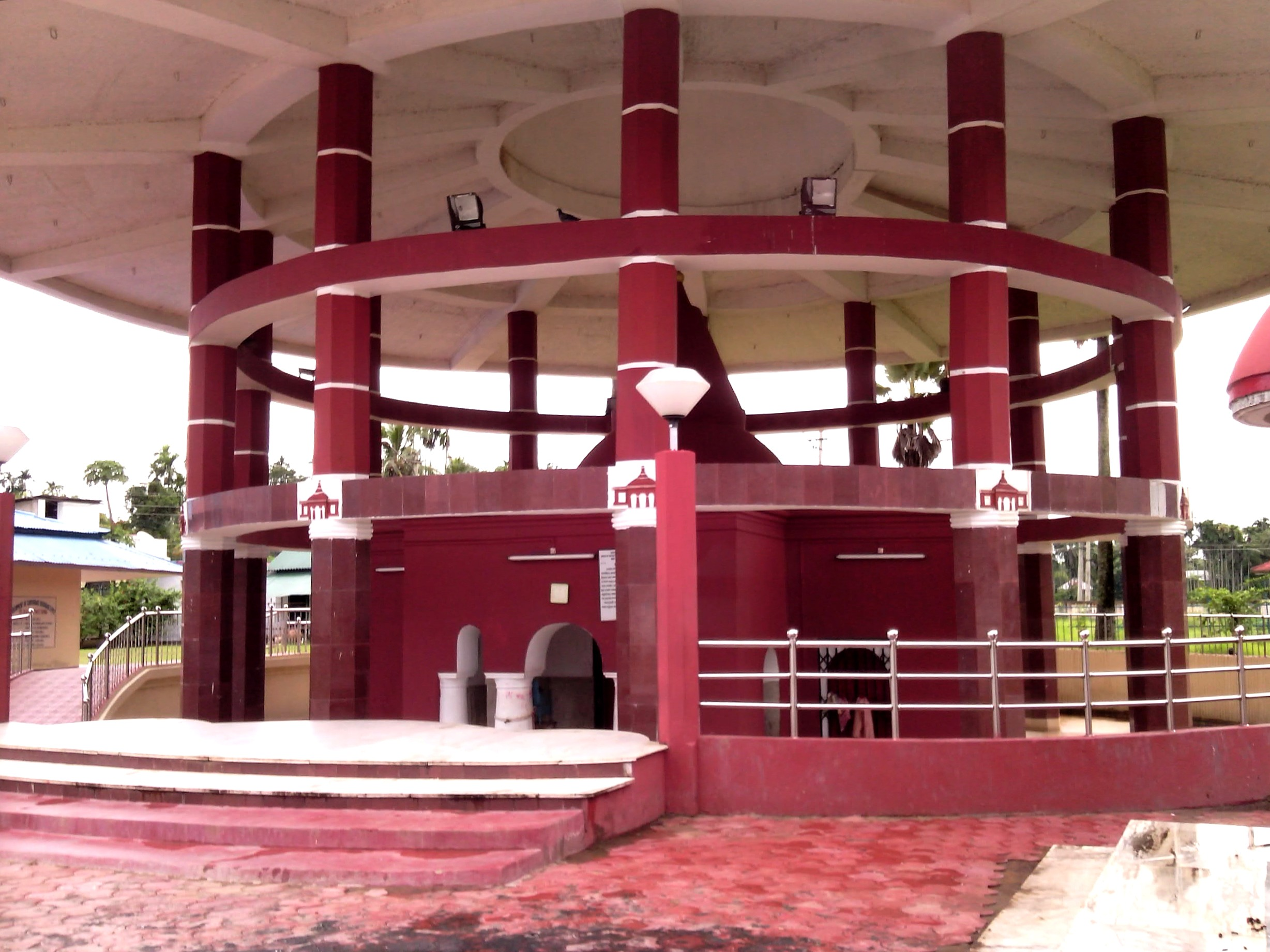

- Location in Tripura Chaturdasha Temple (India)

Religion
- Affiliation: Hinduism
- District: West Tripura
- Festival: Kharchi puja

Location
- Location: Agartala
- State: Tripura
- Country: India
- Interactive map of Chaturdasha Temple
- Coordinates: 23.8413872°N 91.3451919°E

Architecture
- Creator: Krishna Manikya
- Completed: 1761

Chaturdasha Temple is a Hindu temple in Agartala, Tripura, India, and features the Tripuri dome patterned after the roofs of village huts in Tripura. The dome is surmounted by a stupa-like structure which reveals traces of Buddhist influence. This temple was built in honour of fourteen deities, together called the Chaturdasha Devata. Devotees visit the temple for the kharchi festival.

It was built by King Krishna Manikya of Tripura in 1760, when Agartala became the capital city.

In May 2023, the Tripura government began refurbishing the temple and capital complex.

== See also ==
- Hinduism
- Tripura Sundari Temple
- List of Hindu temples in India
