= Tripura Sundari Temple =

Hindu temple in Tripura, India

- ত্রিপুরেশ্বরী মন্দির
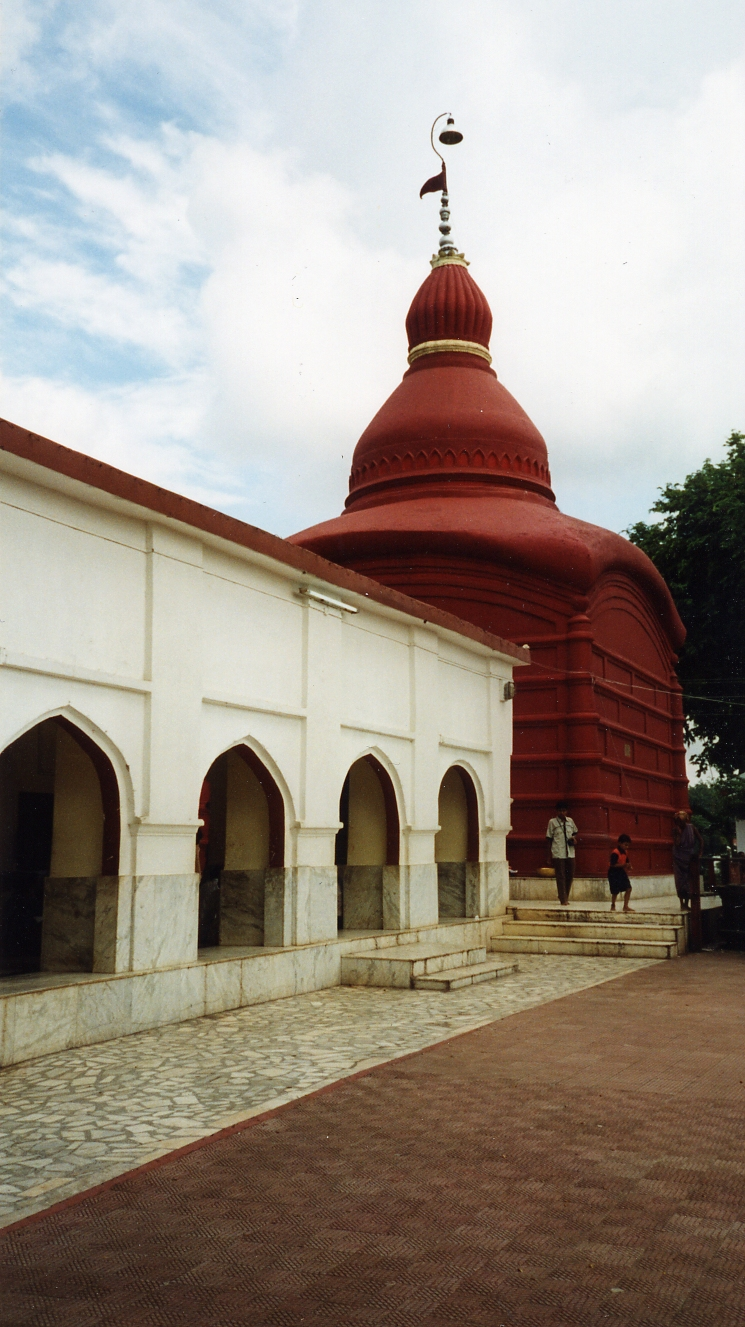
- Tripura Sundari Temple

Religion
- Affiliation: Hinduism
- District: Gomati
- Deity: Lalita Tripura Sundari
- Festivals: Lalita Jayanti on Magha Purnima, Lalita Panchami, Navaratri

Location
- Location: Matabari, Udaipur
- State: Tripura
- Country: India
- Interactive map of Tripura Sundari Temple

Architecture
- Style: Bengali (Ek-ratna style)
- Founder: Maharaja Dhanya Manikya
- Established: 1501 CE

Tripura Sundari Temple is a Hindu temple of the Goddess Tripura Sundari, better known locally as Devi Tripureshwari the third mahavidya and main form of Parvati. The temple is situated in the ancient city of Udaipur, about 55 km from Agartala, Tripura and can be reached by train and road from Agartala. It is believed to be one of the holiest Hindu shrines in this part of the country and witnesses the highest number of visitors for a temple in North-East India, after Kamakhya Temple in Assam. The state of Tripura is named after this temple. Popularly known as Matabari, the shrine is set upon a small hillock that resembles the hump of a tortoise (Kurma). This shape called Kurmapṛṣṭhākṛti is considered the holiest possible site for a Shakti temple, hence also bestowing the name of Kurma Pīṭha. The Goddess is served by traditional Brahmin priests.

The temple is one of the 51 Shakta pithas; legend says that a part of the right foot (Dakshin Charan) of Sati including the big toe fell here. Here, Shakti is worshipped as Tripurasundarī and the accompanying Bhairava is Tripuresh. The main shrine, a cubical edifice with a three-tier roof with a finial, erected by Maharaja of Tripura Dhanya Manikya in 1501 CE, is constructed in the Bengali Ek-ratna style.

There are two similar but different sized black stone idols of the Goddess in the sanctum sanctorum of the temple. The larger and more prominent idol of 5 feet height is of Goddess Tripura Sundari and the smaller one, adorably called Chhoto-Ma (literally, Little Mother), is 2 feet tall and is an idol of Goddess Chandi. The smaller idol was said to have been carried by the kings of Tripura to the battlefield as well as to hunting expeditions. Every year on the occasion of Diwali, a famous Mela takes place near the temple which is visited by more than 0.2 million pilgrims.

== History ==
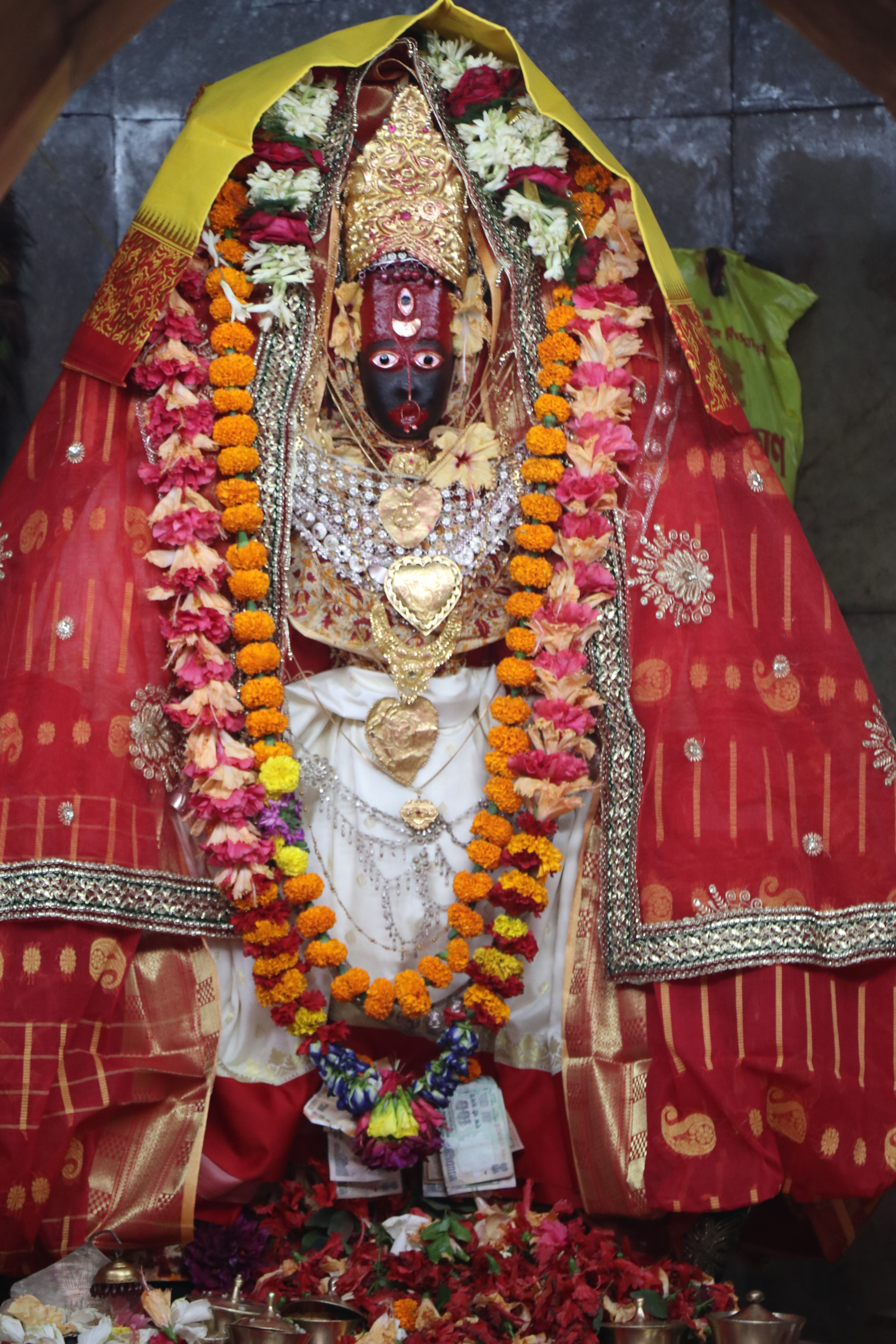
Goddess Tripura Sundari

Legend has it that King Dhanya Manikya, who ruled over Tripura in the closing years of the 15th century, had a revelation one night in a dream in which Goddess Tripura Sundari instructed him to initiate her worship on the hilltop near the town of Udaipur, the contemporary capital of the kingdom. The king found out that a temple on the hillock was already dedicated to Lord Vishnu. He was in a dilemma, unable to decide how a temple dedicated to Vishnu could have an idol of Shakti. The following night, the divine vision was repeated. The king understood that Vishnu and Shakti were different forms of the same Supreme Deity (Brahman). Thus, the temple of Tripura Sundari came into being around the year 1501 CE.

== Attraction of tourist ==
In Udaipur, the Goddess is worshipped as Tripura Sundari. Local variants of the name of the goddess are Tripureśwarī or Ṣoḍaśī. The temple is a small cubical edifice, measuring 24 square feet at the base with a height of 75 feet. The shrine is situated on a small hillock which resembles in shape the hump of a tortoise, which gives it the name of Kurma Pīṭha. As in other typical Hindu temples, stalls along the road to the temple sell flowers and baskets of offerings that visitors can buy and offer to the goddess as Prasādam. The common Prasādam offered here is the Peda. The red hibiscus flower (রক্তজবা) is also prized as an offering to the goddess.

== As a Shakta pitha ==
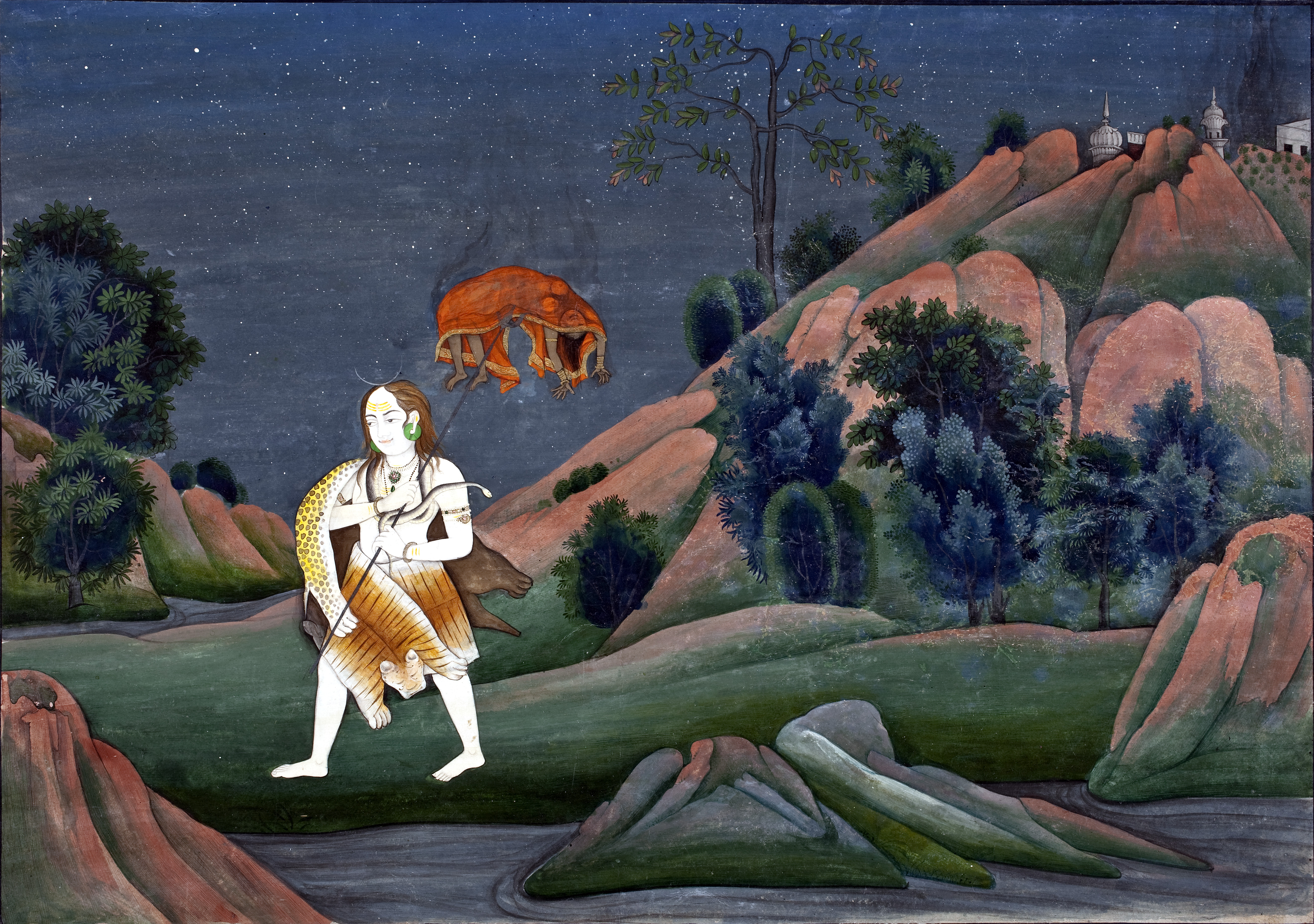
Shiva carrying the corpse of Sati Devi

The real incident of Daksha yaga and Sati's self-immolation had immense significance in shaping the ancient Sanskrit literature and even had impact on the culture of India. It led to the development of the concept of Shakta pithas and there by strengthening Shaktism. Enormous mythological stories in puranas took the Daksha yaga as the reason for its origin. It is an important incident in Shaivism resulting in the emergence of Shree Parvati in the place of Sati Devi and making Shiva a grihastashrami (house holder) leading to the origin of Ganapathy and Subrahmanya.

Shakta pithas are shrines or divine places of the Mother Goddess. These are places that are believes to have enshrined with the presence of Shakti due to the falling of body parts of the corpse of Sati Devi, when Lord Shiva carried it and wandered throughout Aryavartha in sorrow. There are 51 Shakta pithas linking to the 51 alphabets in Sanskrit. Each temple has shrines for Shakti and Kalabhairava and mostly each temple associates different names to Shakti and Kalabhairava in that temple.

== Animal sacrifice ==
Animal sacrifices are a popular custom in the temple. They were banned in October 2019, but were resumed from December 2019, after a 57-day ban.

== Kalyan Sagar ==
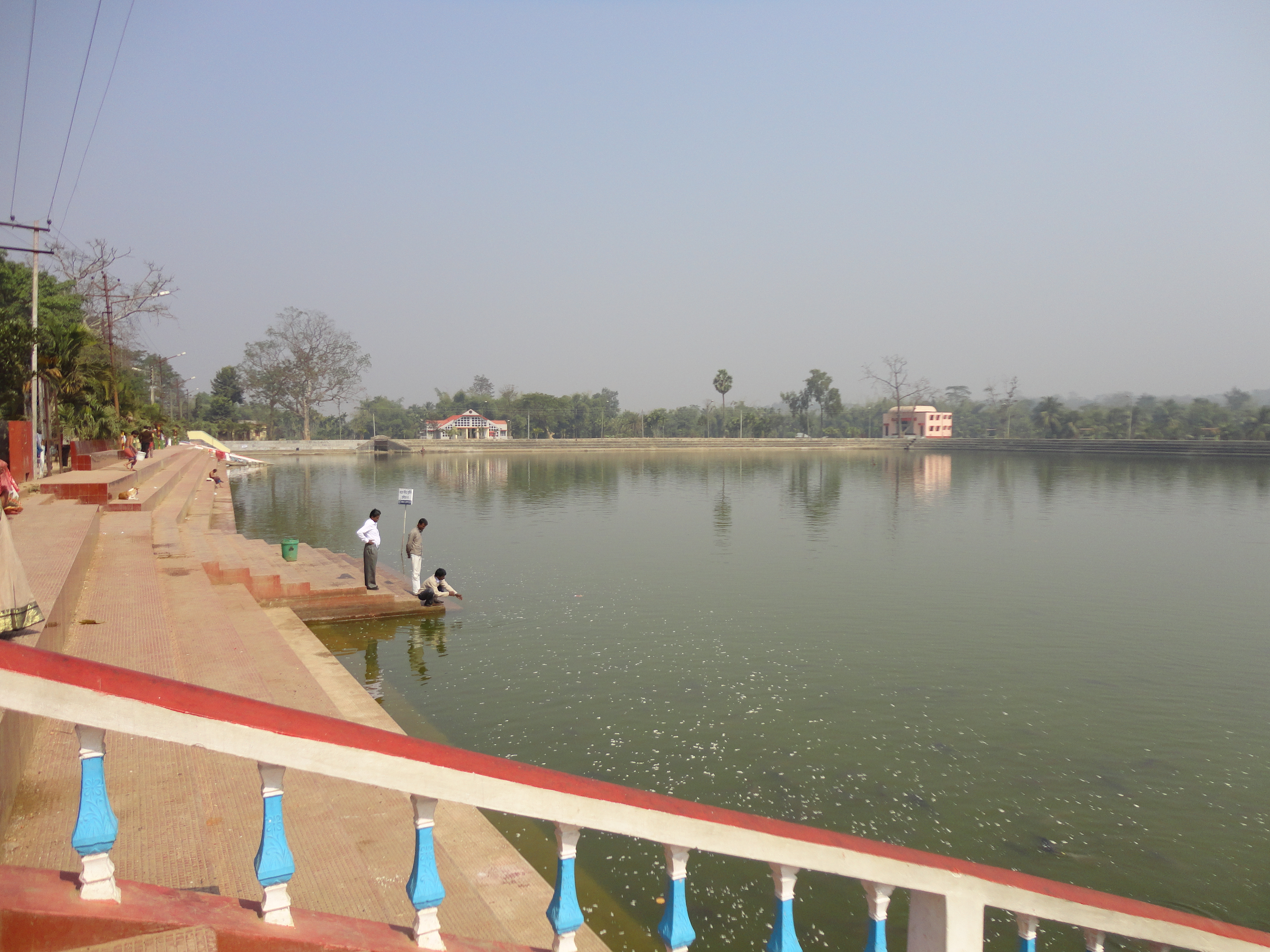
Kalyan Sagar

Kalyan Sagar lies in the eastern side of the temple. Spreading over 6.4 acres, with a length of 224 yards and width of 160 yards this large expanse of water adds a dimension of great beauty to the temple precincts, with hills rising picturesquely in the background. The water is full of rare bostami turtles (considered extinct in the wild), some of them quite large, that come up to the shore looking for crumbs of food that visitors buy at the nearby stalls and feed to these reptiles, as part of the rituals. Devotees feed them with "muri" (puffed rice) and biscuits. Different types of fishes are also found in this pond, however fishing is not permitted here. This natural pond has varieties of aquatic species. The area of the Kalyan Sagar is 2.752 acres. The lake is considered sacred, and devotees worship the fishes and bostami turtles present here. The Matabari Temple Committee is cementing the banks of Kalyan Sagar Lake for the last 2–3 years. The water of the lake became acidic due to destruction of the ecosystem around the lake. This has resulted in death of turtles, as the cemented embankments spoiled the natural habitat as well as places for laying eggs for these turtles. As an amphibian it is extremely essential for the turtles to have sandy exposure, which is not available in the lake after the construction of walls around the water body. Death of at least seven turtles has been reported in the last 6 months. Carrying of plastic polythene bags are banned in and around Matarbari Temple area since 1998, even before the banning order issued by Tripura State Pollution Control Board (TSPCB) for the entire State of Tripura on 21 January 2002. But visitors, tourists, pilgrims and devotees are throwing plastic carry bags every day into the lake. As a result, the bed of the lake is now full of polythene bags. To assess the situation and the state of the natural habitat of the tortoise, a team of TSPCB consisting of scientists and engineers visited the pond and interacted with the local people on 22 March 2003. To check the water quality of the lake, TSPCB collected water samples from four locations of the lake and analyzed the different parameters of the water quality. The results of the study show that the water quality of the lake is very good and even drinkable. According to the experts, it is only the construction of the embankments that increased the mortality of the turtles.

Now due to increasing awareness in the people about conservation of ecosystem, the Kalyan Sagar pond has been revived, and there is a thriving population of the rare bostami turtles living in the lake. The turtles are considered sacred too as Mata Tripura Sundari temple is a kurmapith as the temple premises resemble kurma (a turtle). Also, previously, it was a Vishnu temple and since Kurma is an avatar of Vishnu, these bostami turtles (bostami comes from Bengali word bostam meaning "Vaishnavite Brahmins" or "monks who worship Vishnu") are considered sacred by the devotees visiting the temple.

== See also ==
- Hindu pilgrimage sites
  - Chabimura, 15th-16th century Hindu rock carvings
  - Unakoti, 7th-9th century Hindu rock carvings
- Shakta pithas: there are 3 Shakta pithas in Northeast
  - Assam's Kamakhya Temple Shakta pitha in Guwahati
  - Meghalaya's Nartiang Durga Temple Shakta pitha and 600-year-old temple
  - Tripura's Tripura Sundari Temple Shakta pitha
- Basudev Than
- Tourism in Tripura
- Tourism in Northeast India
