= Montang Valley =

Tourist Place in Tripura

- Location within Tripura Location within India

Highest point
- Coordinates: 23°49′N 91°49′E

Geography
- Location: Teliamura, Khowai district, Tripura
- Parent range: Atharamura Hills

Montang Valley also known as Mountain of Peace is a village and tourist attraction in the Atharamura Hills under Teliamura sub-division in the Khowai district of the Indian state of Tripura. It is located around 80 kilometres (50 mi) from the capital city Agartala, 30 kilometres (19 mi) from National Highway 8 (India) near Teliamura and is known for its floating clouds and scenic beauty.

== History ==
In 2016, the valley was explored by a journalist and filmmaker turned politician Kamal Kalai. He devised innovative plans to tap into the tourism potential of the area.

In 2021, Kalai became and Executive Member of TTAADC. With a strategic approach, he successfully secured funds from the Pradhan Mantri Gram Sadak Yojana (PMGSY) to facilitate the construction of connecting roads from National Highway 8 to Montang and built a 'Tong ghar' there(a traditional tribal house). Following Kalai's sharing of images of the location on social media, they quickly went viral. Subsequently, the place experienced an unexpected surge in popularity, transforming into a bustling tourist attraction and emerging as a new destination for tourists and nature enthusiasts.
