= Emblem of Tripura =

Official seal of Indian state of Tripura

Seal of Tripura
- Armiger: The Government of Tripura
- Adopted: 2025
- Shield: National emblem of India; Map of Tripura
- Motto: "सत्यमेव जयते" (Satyameva Jayate, Sanskrit for "Truth Alone Triumphs")
- Other elements: Government of Tripura

The Seal of Tripura is the official seal of the government of the Indian state of Tripura. It was initially proposed in October 2024 and approved on 7 January 2025. Previously the state used the national emblem of India for official purposes.

== Design ==
The emblem depicts the national emblem superimposed over a map of the state within an orange roundel.

== Historic emblems ==
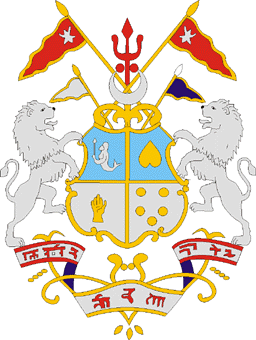
Coat of arms of the Kingdom of Tripura

Emblem of Tripura used prior to January 2025

== Emblems of autonomous district councils in Tripura ==
The Tripura Tribal Areas Autonomous District Council adopted a distinct emblem in 2024.

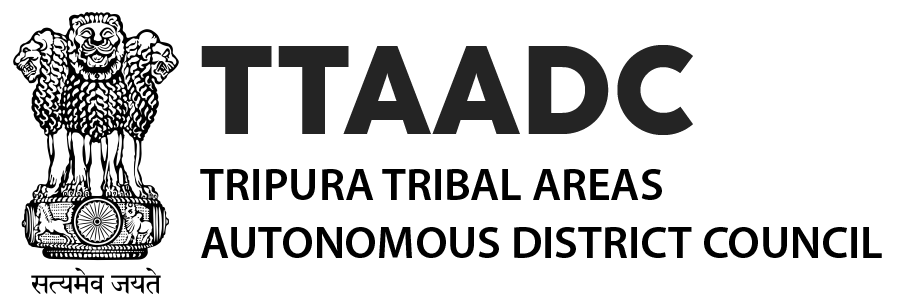
Emblem of the TTAADC before 2024

Emblem of the TTAADC since 2024

== See also ==
- National Emblem of India
- List of Indian state emblems
