= Chabimura =

Place in Tripura, India

Chabimura/Chakwrakma
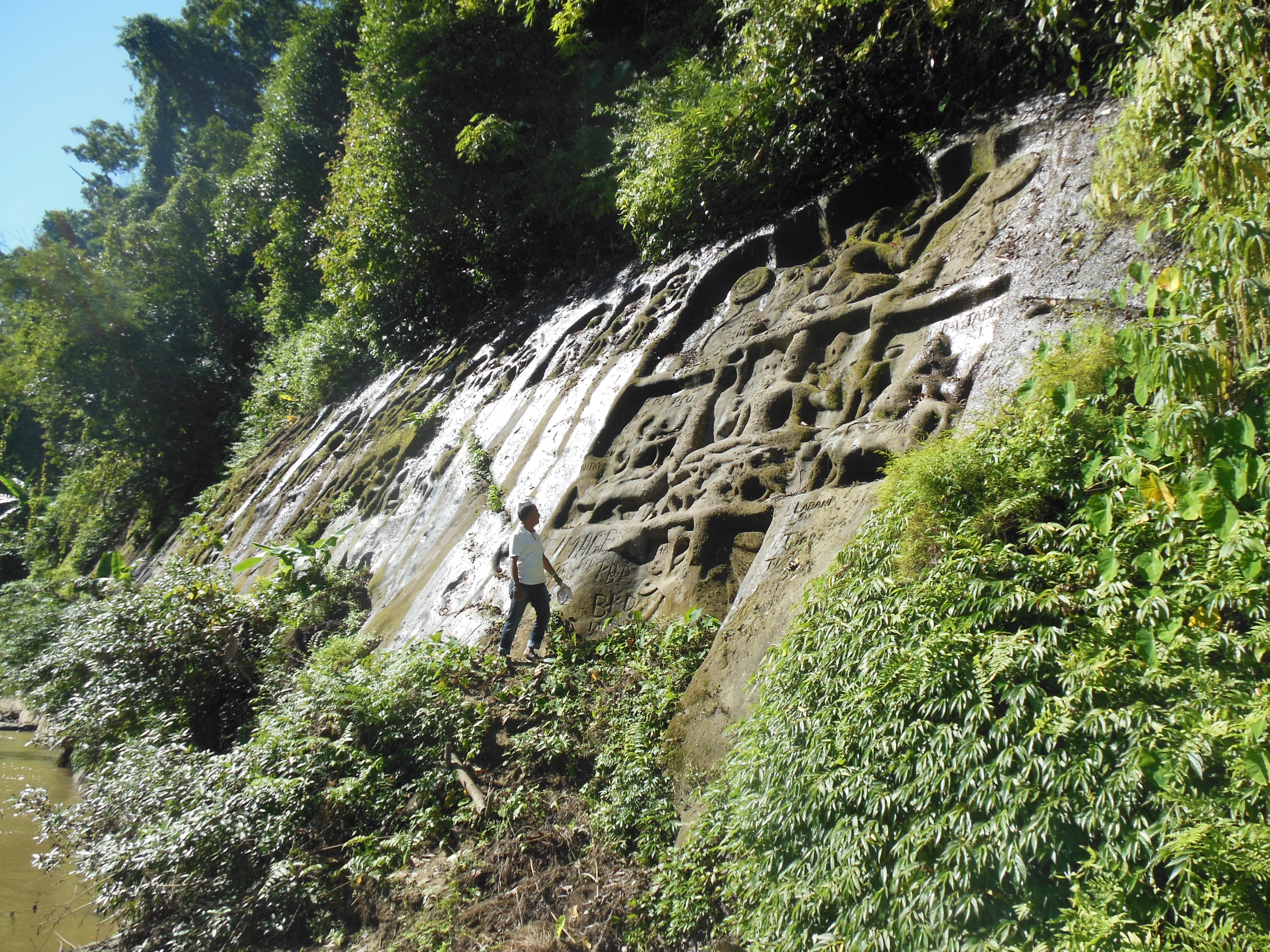
- Rock cravings of Durga in Chabimura
- Artist: Unknown
- Year: 15th to 16th century
- Medium: Sand rock
- Subject: God and Goddess in Rock carving
- Location: Gomati district, Tripura, India
- Owner: Govt. of Tripura
- Website: http://tripuratourism.gov.in/chabimura

Chabimura also known as Chakwrakma or Chakrakma is famous for its panels of rock carving on steep mountain wall on the bank of Gomati river in Indian state Tripura. There are huge carved images of Shiva, Vishnu, Kartika, Mahisasura Mardini Durga and other Gods and Goddesses.

It is situated on the bank of Gomati river at Haakwchak or Haakchak, Amarpur subdivision under Gomati district, 82 km away from main city and capital Agartala, Tripura, India, 30 km away from Udaipur and 7.5 km away from Amarpur.

== Durga in Chabimura ==
The biggest idol of Maa Durga in rock carvings is about 20 feet high. The carvings images date back to 15-16th centuries.

Images are curved on the rocky faces of Devtamura which is steep at 90 degrees. The hill ranges are covered with thick jungles and one can reach this abode of gods only after trekking through these jungles.

== See also ==
- Hindu pilgrimage sites
  - Unakoti, 7th-9th century Hindu rock carvings
- Shaktipeetha: there are 3 Shaktipeetha in Northeast
  - Assam's Kamakhya Temple Shaktipeetha in Guwahati
  - Meghalaya's Nartiang Durga Temple Shaktipeetha and 600-year-old temple
  - Tripura's Tripura Sundari Temple Shaktipeetha
- National Geological Monuments of India
- List of Hindu temples
- Tourism in India
- Yatra
