= Languages of Tripura =

State in North East India

Languages of Tripura, a state in the Northeast India, include Bengali and Kokborok as official languages, and many other minority languages. As in the rest of India, English is used for official purpose. Bengali is the most spoken language, due to the predominance of Bengali people in the state. Kokborok is spoken by the Tripuri people.

Languages of Tripura (2011)
1. Bengali (63.4%)
2. Tripuri (25.9%)
3. Chakma (2.29%)
4. Mogh (Marma) (0.97%)
5. Meitei (Manipuri) (0.64%)
6. Halam (0.62%)
7. Bishnupriya Manipuri (0.60%)
8. Others (5.53%)

In the state of Tripura, most of the languages of India are used. Major languages in terms of the number of speakers per 2011 census of India are as follows:

Language	Population	Percentage
Bengali	2,330,452	63.43
Tripuri	950,875	25.88
Chakma	84,269	2.29
Hindi	56,696	1.54
Mogh (Marma)	35,722	0.97
Meitei (Manipuri)	23,779	0.64
Halam	23,089	0.62
Bishnupriya Manipuri	22,112	0.60
Garo	21,019	0.57
Mongsen	19,278	0.52
Others	106,626	2.90%
Total	3,673,917	100.00

A report in Times of India said that the state is home to three dozen languages including some that are nearly extinct, including Saimar which was spoken by only 4 people in 2012.

== See also ==
- Meitei language in Tripura
