= Healthcare in Tripura =

Healthcare in Tripura features a universal health care system run by the state government. The Constitution of India charges every state with "raising of the level of nutrition and the standard of living of its people and the improvement of public health as among its primary duties". Ministry of Health & Family Welfare of the Government of Tripura is responsible for healthcare administration in the state.

The health care infrastructure is divided into three tiers — the primary health care network, a secondary care system comprising district and sub-divisional hospitals and tertiary hospitals providing specialty and super specialty care.

== Healthcare indices ==
Following table illustrates some health care indicators of the state, compared to the national indicator, as of 2010. These data are based on the Sample Registration System of the Office of the Registrar General and Census Commissioner, India.

Indicator	Tripura	India
Birth rate	14.9	22.1
Death rate	5.0	7.2
Infant mortality rate	27	47
Total fertility rate	2.2	2.7
Natural growth rate	9.9	14.9

== Statistics ==
As of 2010–11, there are 17 hospitals, 11 rural hospitals and community health centres, 79 primary health centres, 635 sub-centres/dispensaries, 7 blood banks and 7 blood storage centres in the state. Homeopathic and Ayurvedic styles of medicine are also popular in the state. The number of beds in the four district of the state available for patients are as follows:

Item	West Tripura	North Tripura	South Tripura	Dhalai	Total
Number of beds	2235	445	601	270	3548
In Hospitals	1937	200	325	200	2662
In PHCs/RHs	298	242	276	70	886

Although the state government is trying to promote family welfare and birth control, the target achievement in birth control measures has remained limited; none of the birth control methods achieved 50% of the target in 2010–11. Immunisation programs have been more successful, most immunisation programs achieved nearly 70% of the target.

== Public and private sectors ==
National Family Health Survey-3 revealed that 20% of the residents of Tripura do not generally use government health facilities, and prefers private medical sector. This is overwhelmingly less compare VERY VERY poor quality of care as the most frequent reason for non-reliance over public health sector. Other reasons include distance of the public sector facility, long waiting time, and inconvenient hours of operation.
