= 2014 Indian general election in Tripura =

Election

Indian general election in Tripura, 2014
- 7 April − 12 April 2014

2 seats
- Turnout: 84.92% (▲0.37%)
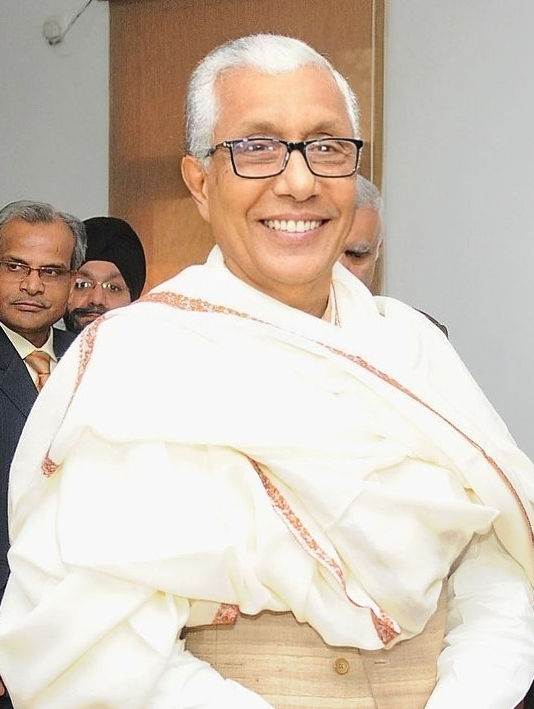
	First party
Leader	Manik Sarkar
Party	CPI(M)
Last election	2
Seats won	2
Seat change	Steady
Percentage	64%
Swing	▲2.31%
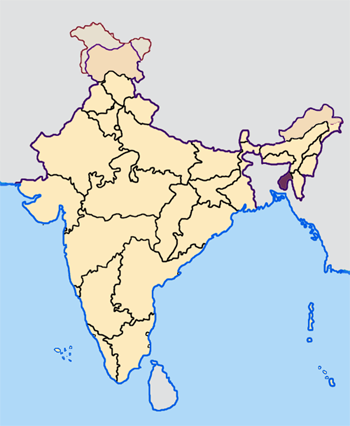
- Tripura
Prime Minister before election
Manmohan Singh
INC
Prime Minister after election
Narendra Modi
BJP

The 2014 Indian general election polls in Tripura for 2 Lok Sabha seats was held in two phases on 7 and 12 April 2014. As of 7 February 2014, the total voter strength of Tripura is 2,379,541.

The main political parties in Tripura are Communist Party of India (Marxist) (CPI(M)) and Indian National Congress (INC).

== Election schedule ==
Constituency wise Election schedule are given below-

Polling Day	Phase	Date	Constituencies
1	1	7 April	Tripura West
2	4	12 April	Tripura East

== Parties and alliances ==
Party	Flag	Symbol	Leader	Seats contested
Communist Party of India (Marxist)			Manik Sarkar	2
Indian National Congress			Diba Chandra Hrangkhawl	2
Bharatiya Janata Party			Narendra Modi	2
All India Trinamool Congress			Mamata Banerjee	2

== Opinion poll ==
Conducted in Month(s)	Ref	Polling Organisation/Agency			
Conducted in Month(s)	Ref	Polling Organisation/Agency	INC	BJP	CPI(M)
Aug–Oct 2013		Times Now-India TV-CVoter	0	0	2
Jan–Feb 2014		Times Now-India TV-CVoter	0	0	2

== Results ==
The results of the elections were declared on 16 May 2014.

2
CPI(M)

=== Detailed Results ===
Party Name	Popular vote			Seats		
Party Name	Votes	%	±pp	Contested	Won	+/−
CPI(M)	12,95,436	64.01	▲2.32	2	2	Steady
INC	3,07,592	15.20	▼15.55	2	0	Steady
AITC	1,94,755	9.62	Steady	2	0	Steady
BJP	1,15,319	5.70	▲2.32	2	0	Steady
Others	69,180	3.42	Steady	13	0	Steady
IND	17,764	0.88	▼1.15	4	0	Steady
NOTA	23,783	1.18	Steady			
Total	20,23,829	100%	-	25	2	-

=== Party Wise ===
Constituency		Winner				Runner-up				Margin	
Constituency		Candidate	Party	Votes	%	Candidate	Party	Votes	%	Votes	%
1	Tripura West	Sankar Prasad Datta	CPI(M)	671,665	62.43	Arunoday Saha	INC	168,179	15.63	503,486	46.80
2	Tripura East	Jitendra Chaudhury	CPI(M)	623,771	65.47	Sachitra Debbarma	INC	139,413	14.63	484,358	50.84

== Assembly Segment wise lead ==
Party	Assembly segments	Position in Assembly (as of 2013 election)
Communist Party of India (Marxist)	60	49
Indian National Congress	0	10
Others	0	1
Total	60	
