= Tripura Road Transport Corporation =

Government agency in Tripura, India

- Parent: Department of Transport, Tripura
- Founded: 1948
- Headquarters: Agartala and Tripura
- Service type: Local, Commuter, Contract, All-India
- Operator: Department of Transport, Govt. of Tripura
- Website: Tripura Road Transport Corporation

Tripura Road Transport Corporation (TRTC), is the government agency overlooking public road transport in Tripura, India.

The transport department of Tripura, a public undertaking, is considered eligible under the provisions of the 2005 Right to Information Act. It is the only government body responsible for all transport-related issues and manages numerous areas. The headquarters is located in the western districts of Tripura, housing the office of the joint transport commissioner, with additional offices situated in the northern, southern, and Dhalai regions. The main branch office is in Dharmanagar. Another unit is at Churaibari Gate, primarily responsible for inspecting all vehicles passing through that road for toll tax.

== Administration ==
TRTC is governed by the transport minister of Tripura. The departmental commissioner, respective secretary, and other officers of that particular section head the jurisdiction and operations fully. As the government, higher authorities control every function and they form the regulations. They have also formed different acts for the better running the transport system, which are: State Transport and regional Authority of transport, Motor vehicle, Transport Corporation.

Apart from making decisions as to the movement of the vehicle, they also handle development issues, which include building roads, installing street lights, and handling all management functions.

== Hiring of buses ==
TRTC also hires buses and taxis at varying rates.
