= Unakoti =

Heritage site in Tripura, India

- Subrai Khung
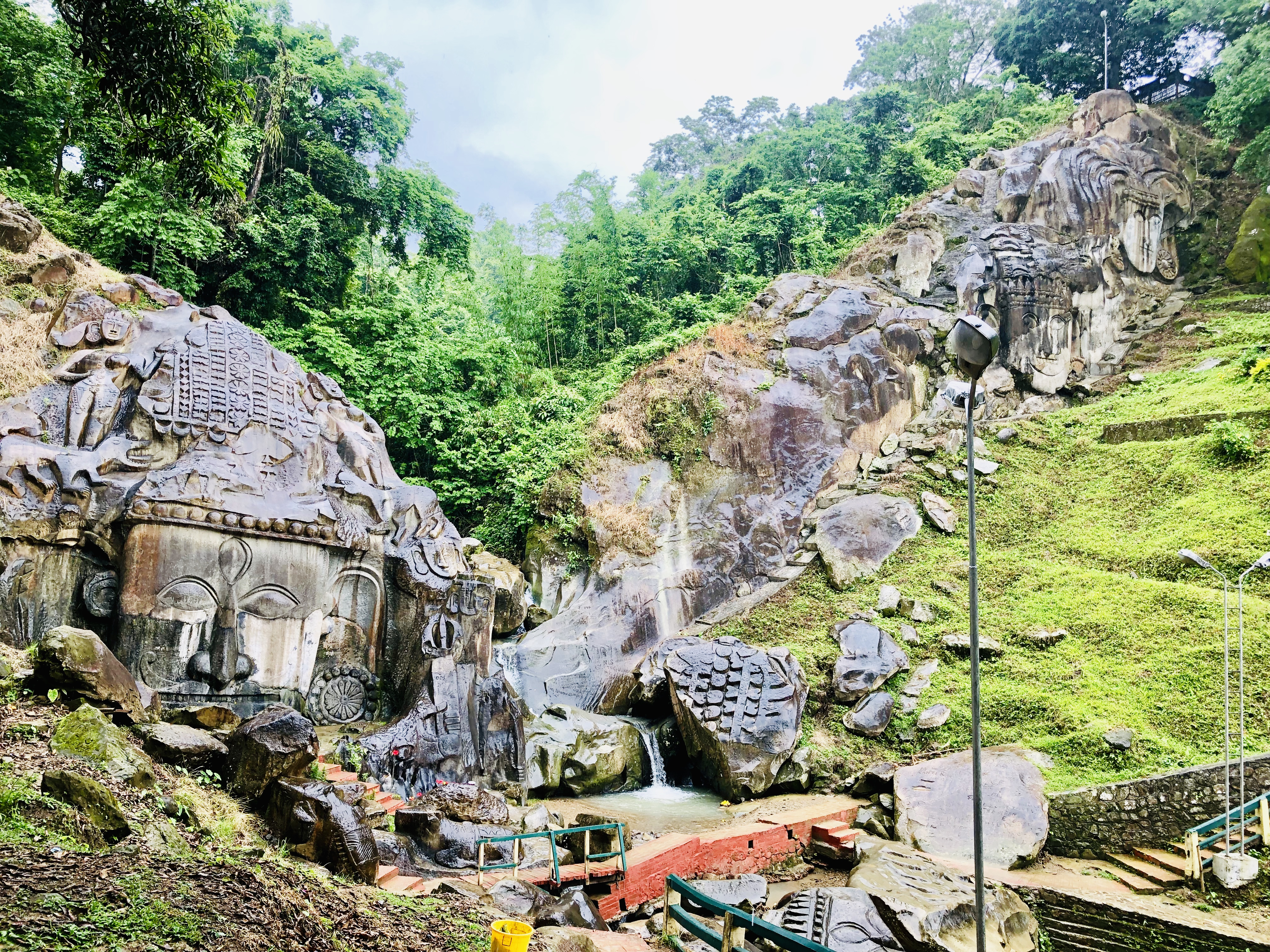
- The rock wall

- Location in Tripura Unakoti (India)

Religion
- Affiliation: Hinduism
- District: Unakoti
- Festival: Asokastami Festival

Location
- Location: Kailasahar
- State: Tripura
- Country: India
- Coordinates: 24°19′N 92°4′E

Architecture
- Type: sculptural emblem
- Completed: 600–850 CE

Unakoti or Subrai Khung is a sculptural emblem and ancient Shaivite place that hosts rock carvings, figures and images of gods and goddesses. The bas relief sculptures at Unakoti are on stylistic grounds ascribed to 7th–9th century CE, to the period of Pre-Manikya rule. The rock art was patronised by Deva Dynasty of Sribhumi in Samatata. The only inscription at Unakoti is on the other Chaturmukhalinga image, consisting of a couple of records in Bengali Characters of the 11th to 12th century CE, which mentions one Sri Jayadeva, probably a pilgrim.

Unakoti literally means "one less than one crore/koti" in Hindi and Bengali. In the local Kokborok language, it is called Subrai Khung. It was put on the UNESCO world heritage site tentative list in 2022. It is the prime tourist spot of Unakoti District, in the Kailashahar Subdivision of the North-eastern Indian state of Tripura.

== Description ==
The images found at Unakoti are of two types: namely rock-carved figures and stone images. Among the rock-cut carvings, the central Shiva head and gigantic Ganesha figures deserve special mention. The central Shiva head known as Unakotiswara Kal Bhairava is about 30 feet high including an embroidered head-dress which itself is 10 feet high. On each side of the head-dress of the central Shiva, there are two full-size female figures - one of Durga standing on a lion and another female figure on the other side. In addition, three enormous images of Nandi Bull are found half-buried in the ground. There are various other stone as well as rock-cut images at Unakoti.

== Legend ==
According to Hindu scriptures, Lord Shiva once spent a night here en route to Kashi. 99,99,999 gods and goddesses followed him. He had asked his followers to wake up before sunrise and make their way towards Kashi. Unfortunately, none awoke, except Lord Shiva himself. Before he set out for Kashi alone, he put a curse on the others, turning them to stone and that is how the site got its name.

Local tribals believe that the maker of these idols was Kallu Gurjar. He was a devotee of Parvati and wanted to accompany Shiva–Parvati to their abode on Mount Kailash. On Parvati's insistence, Shiva reluctantly agreed to take Kallu to Kailash, on the condition that he would have to make one crore idols of Shiva in one night. Kallu got involved in this work like a man of his tune. But when dawn broke, the idols turned out to be one less than one crore (or unakoti). Adamant on getting rid of Kallu, Shiva left him with his idols in Unakoti, making this his excuse, and kept on walking.

The existence of 99,99,999 idols in Unakoti (according to the legend) is the apparent reason for the derivation of the village's name.

== Festival ==
Every year a big fair popularly known as Ashokastami Mela is held in the month of April. The festival is visited by thousands of pilgrims. Another smaller festival takes place in January.

== Location ==
Unakoti lies 178 km to the northeast from Agartala which has the closest airport, 8 km to the east from Kailashahar, district headquarters of Unakoti district, 148 km to the south-east from Silchar. The nearest railway station is 19.6 km away at Dharmanagar railway station on the Lumding–Sabroom section. From Dharmanagar railway station it takes about 30–40 minutes by car. Travelling from capital town Agartala has become much easier nowadays. The morning train from Agartala reaches Dharmanagar before 10 am. The afternoon train from Dharmanagar reaches Agartala by 8 PM.

== Preservation ==
The site has suffered centuries of neglect causing degradation and loss of considerable scale to the rock art. Since its adoption by the ASI (Archaeological Survey of India) as a heritage site, the situation has slightly improved, though a lot of work including substantial excavation remains to be undertaken. The Centre has recently granted Rs 12 crore to the state for developing the area, 178 km from here, as a major tourist destination.

The site was added to the tentative list of the UNESCO World Heritage Site in December 2022.

== Iconography ==
Sculptures of Unakoti hills, stone cut images of gods and goddesses and rock carvings

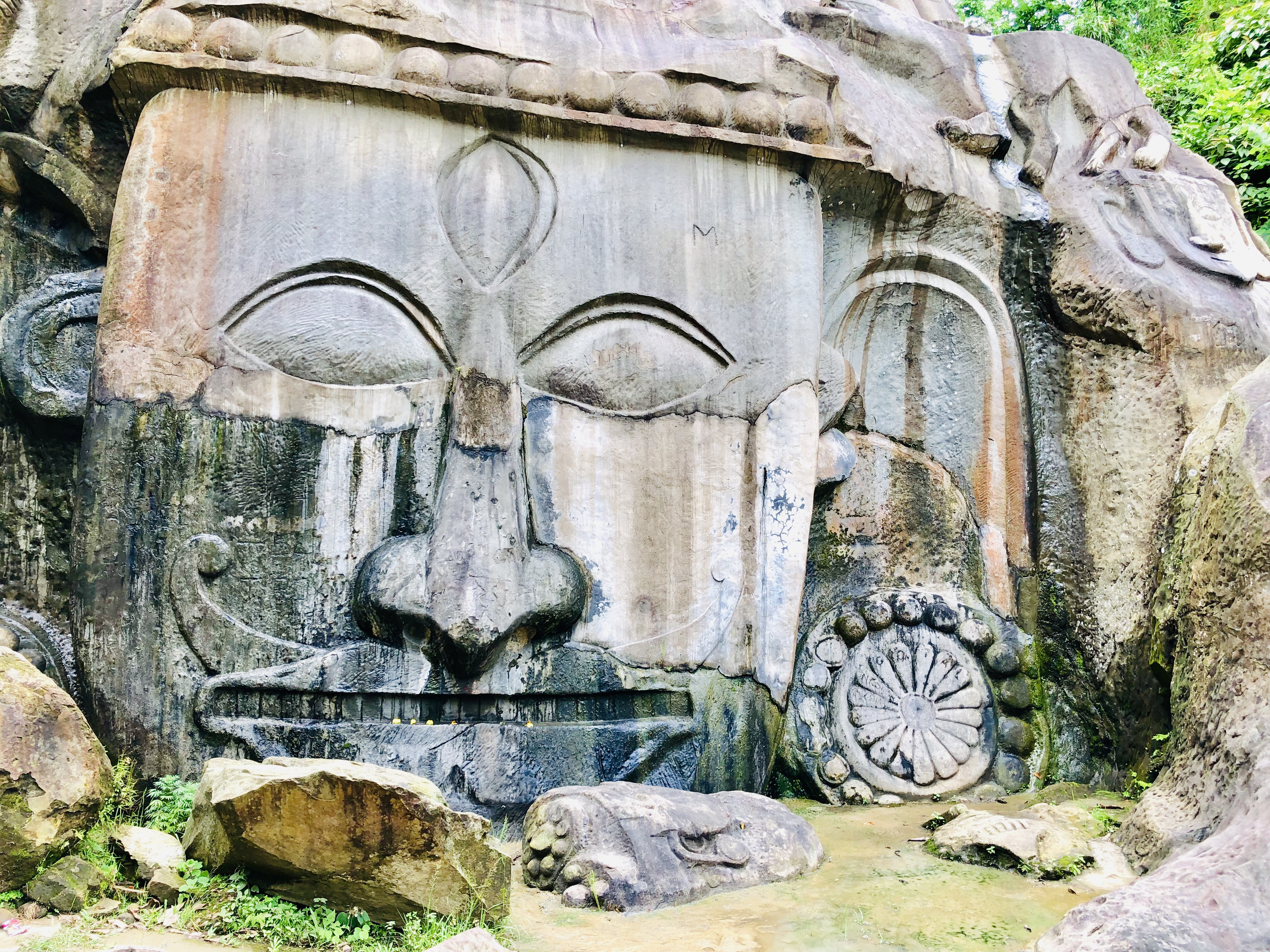
Close up of the sculpture of Shiva.

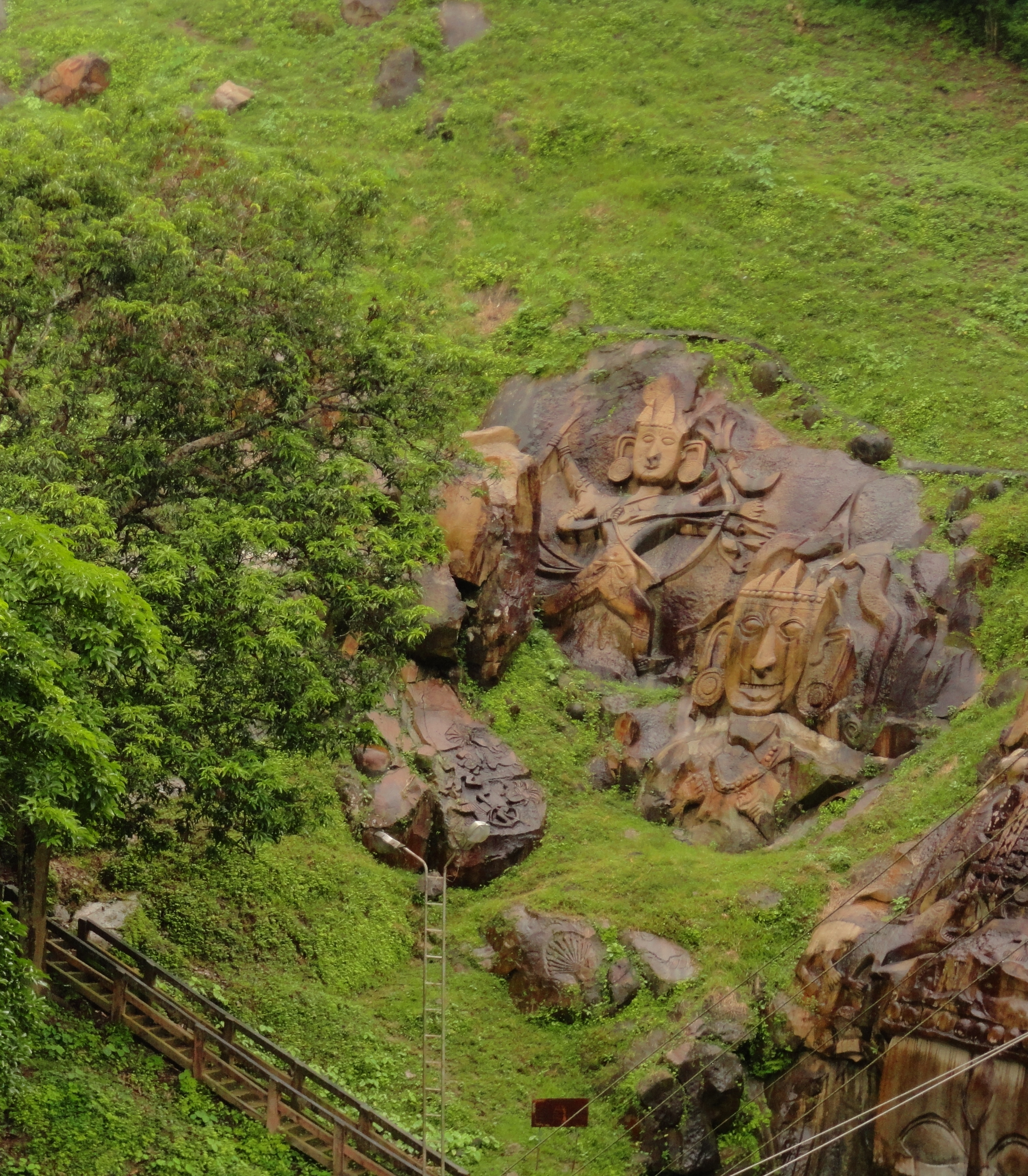
Image of Durga.

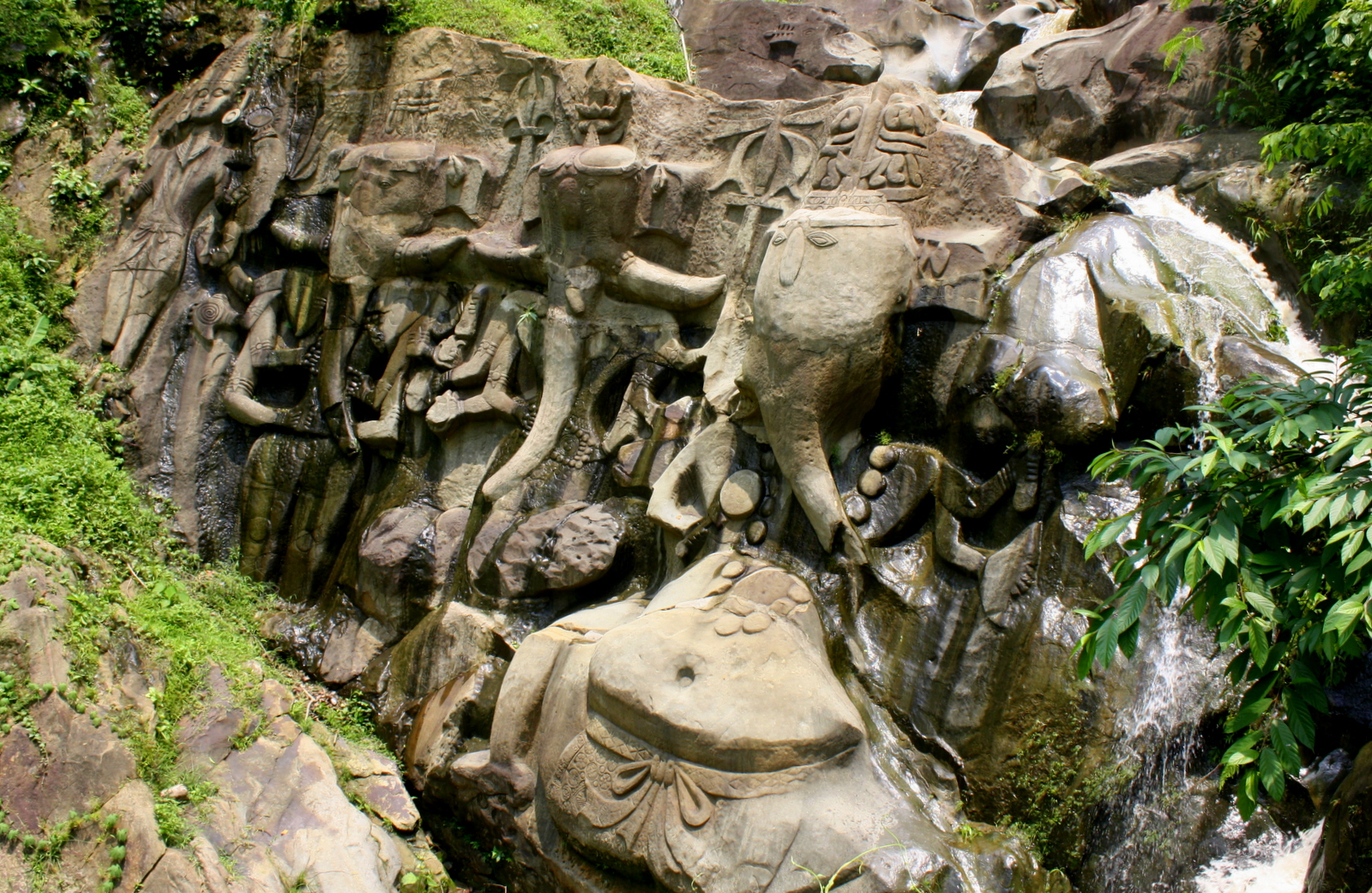
Image of Gigantic Ganesha

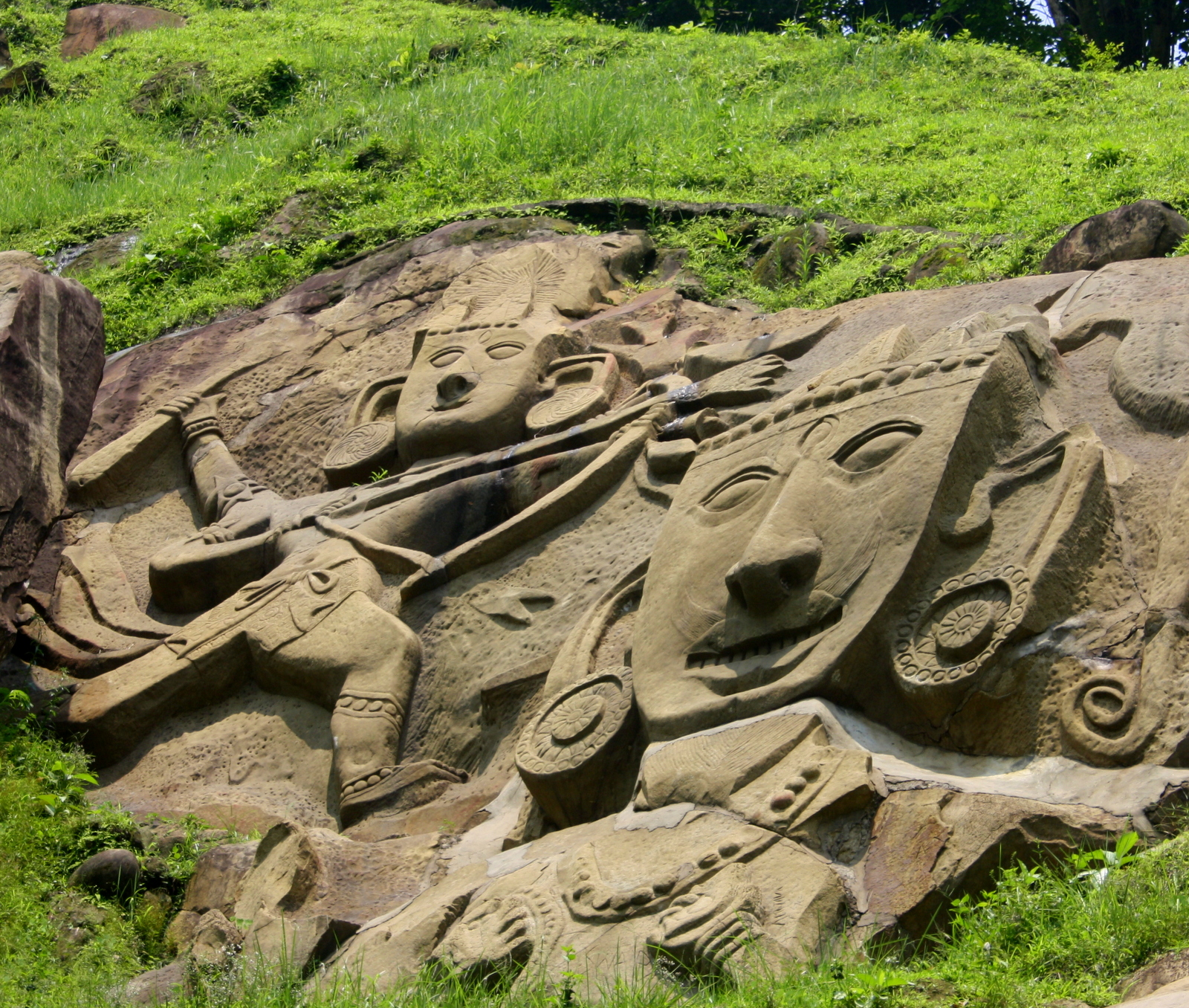
Image of KalBhairava

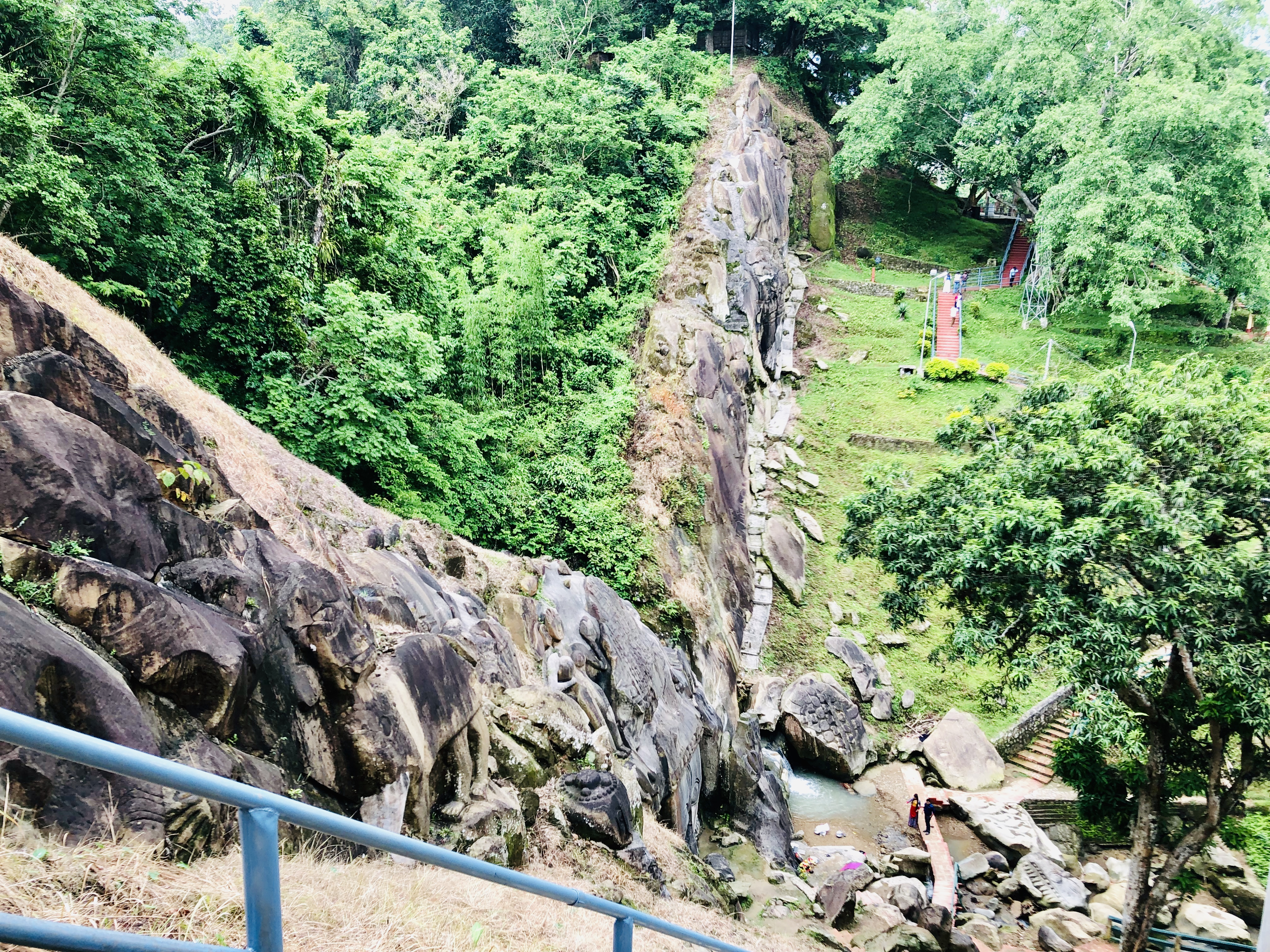
A wall of stone with reliefs.

== See also ==
- Hindu pilgrimage sites
  - Chabimura, 15th-16th century Hindu rock carvings
- Shaktipeetha: there are 3 Shaktipeetha in Northeast
  - Assam's Kamakhya Temple Shaktipeetha in Guwahati
  - Meghalaya's Nartiang Durga Temple Shaktipeetha and 600-year-old temple
  - Tripura's Tripura Sundari Temple Shaktipeetha
- National Geological Monuments of India
- List of Hindu temples
- Tourism in India
- Yatra
