= Kamalasagar =

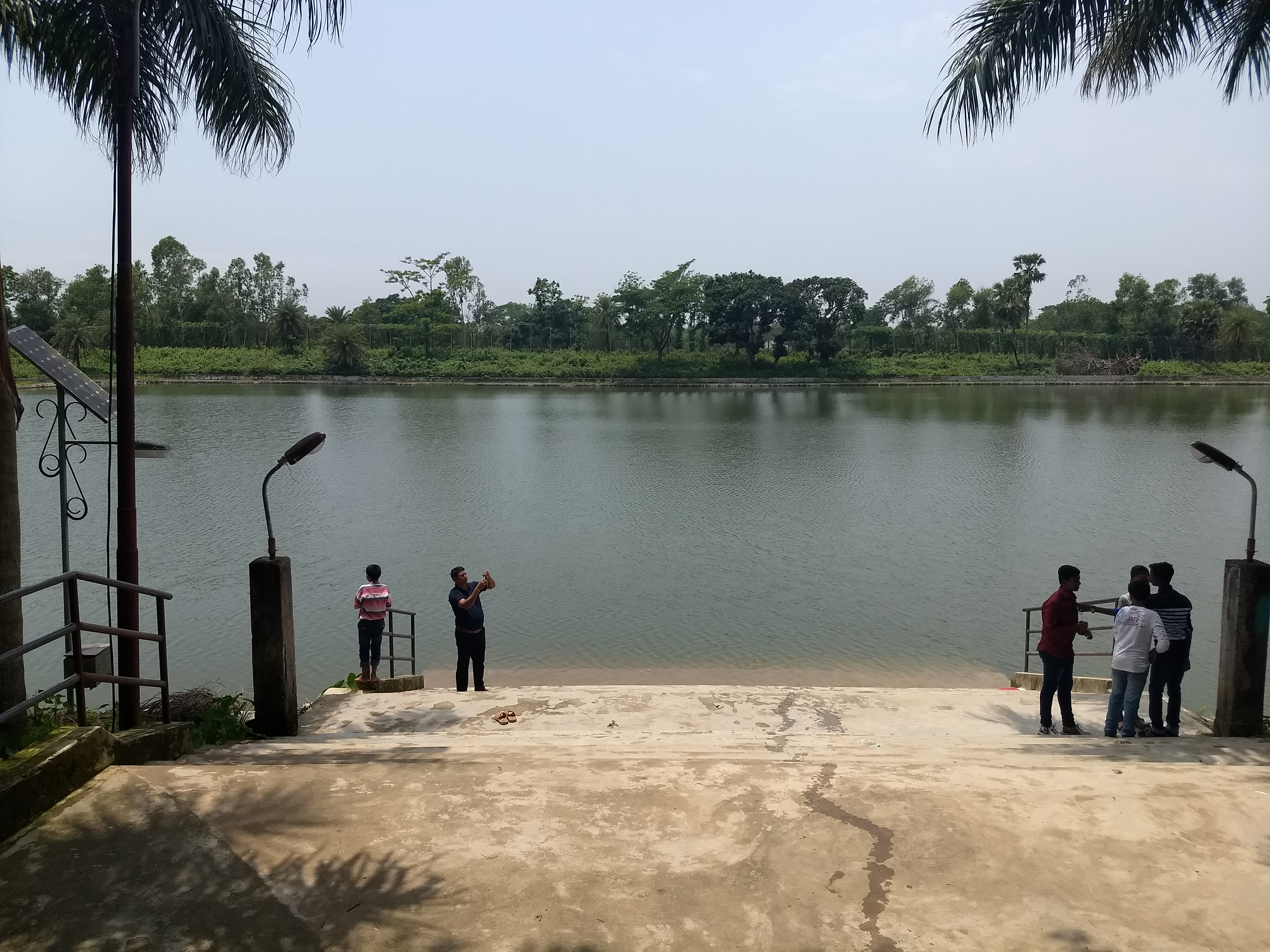
- Kamalasagar

- Location within Tripura Location within India
- Location: Tripura
- Coordinates: 23.744°N 91.175°E
- Type: reservoir
- Basin countries: India

Kamalasagar is an artificial lake in Tripura, India, constructed by King Dhanya Manikya of Tripura in the 15th century and is a popular spot for picnickers. A mela is held there every October during the Navaratri festival.

== Politics ==
Kamalasagar assembly constituency is part of Tripura West (Lok Sabha constituency).

== See also ==
- Kasbeswari Kali Mata
