= Kasbeswari Kali Mata =

- কসবেশ্বরী কালী মাতা
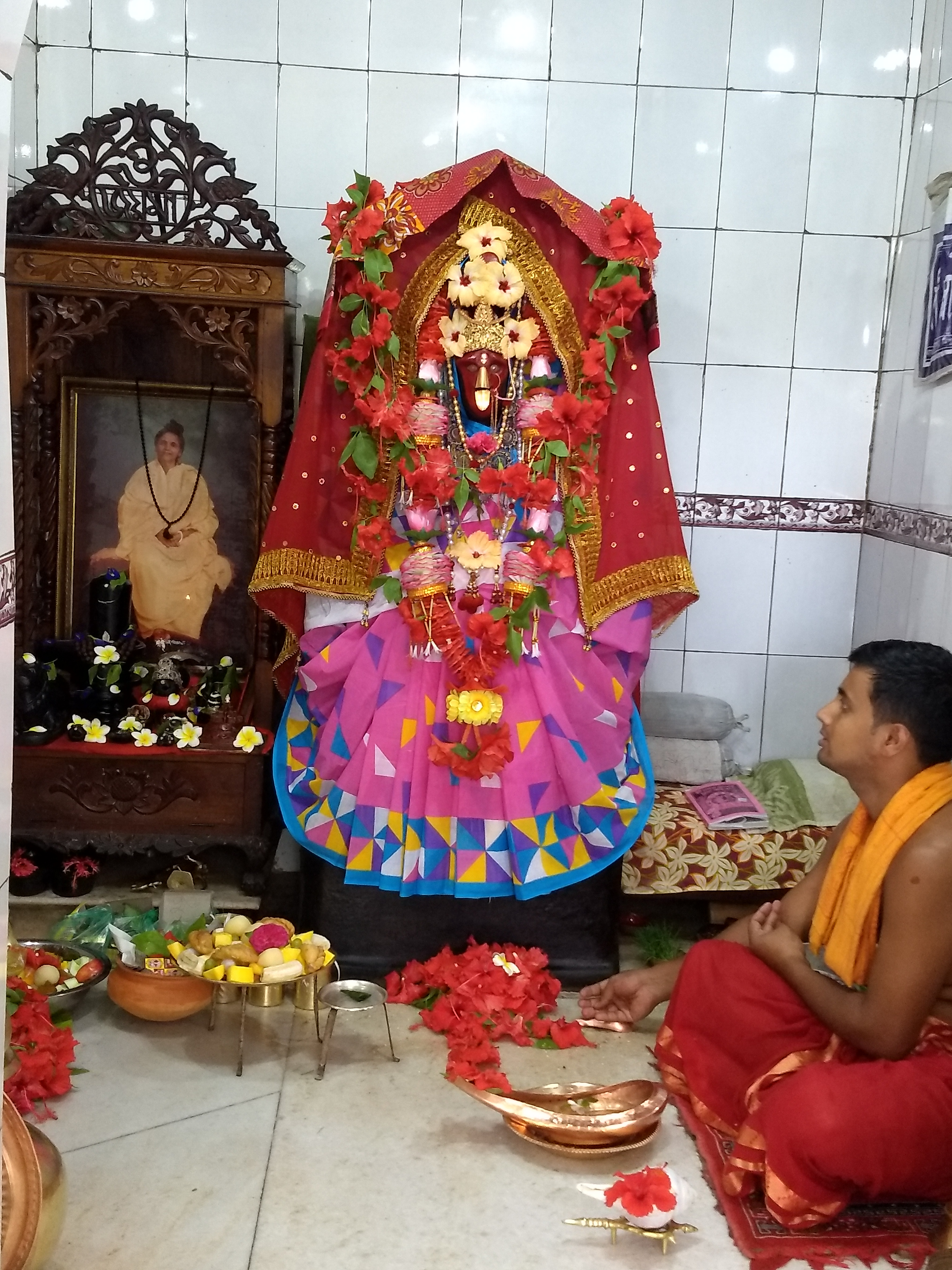

- Location in Tripura

Religion
- Affiliation: Hinduism
- District: Sipahijala
- Deity: Kali

Location
- Location: Kamalasagar
- State: Tripura
- Country: India
- Interactive map of Kasbeswari Kali Mata
- Coordinates: 23°44′24.59″N 91°9′35.35″E

Architecture
- Type: Bengal architecture
- Creator: Dhanya Manikya
- Completed: Late 15 century

Kasbeswari Kali Mata or Kamalasagar Kali Temple was built on a hill-top by Maharaja Dhanya Manikya in the late 15th century. It is situated just beside the Bangladesh border, The lake, Kamalasagar, in front of this temple rightly enhances its beauty.

Kamalasagar Temple is located about 27 km from Agartala in a small village called Kasba . It falls on Indo- Bangladesh border. The temple is placed on a hillock overlooking Kamalasagar.

== History of the lake ==
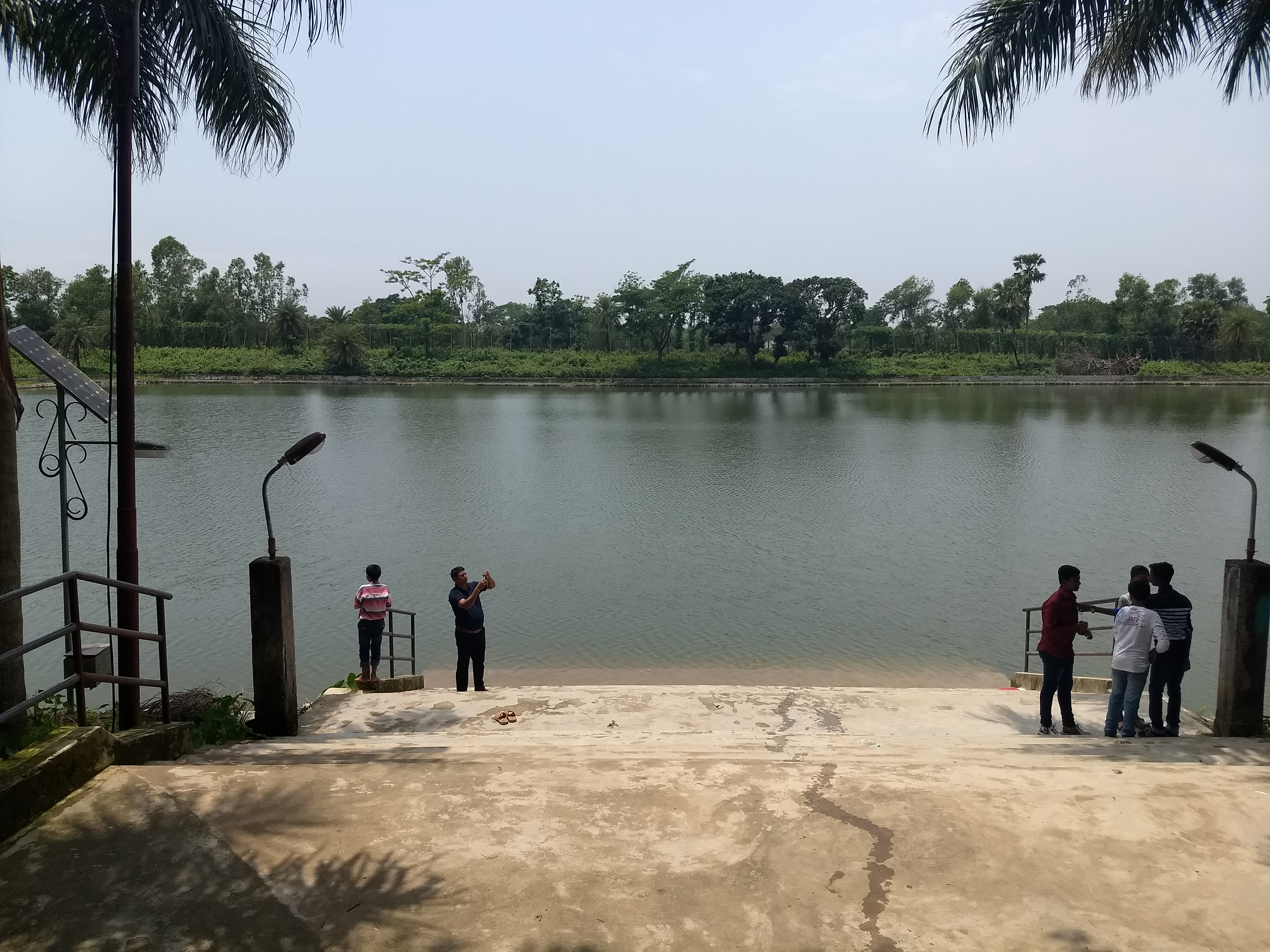
Kamalasagar

Kamalasagar lake dug by king Dhanya Manikya (1490–1520). He dug this two wavy blue water lakes in front of the Ujjayanta palace. That time Tripura's capital was Udaipur and now it is the present headquarter of south Tripura District. Udaipur is also known as a ‘lake-town’ because of the surfeit of large lakes, dug by different princely rulers. These lakes coupled with the river Gomati that flows by Udaipur will enthuse tourists to have a pleasant outing.

== Description of the Idol ==
The idol of Kamalasagar Kali temple called as Kasbeswari Kali, which is actually idol of the goddess Dasabhuja Durga or Mahishasurmardini. This 15 century idol made of sandstone. And recent temple was built in the 17th century. Although it is idol of Ma Durga but it worshipped as Maa Kali. Also there is a Shivalinga sculpture at the feet of the idol. Devotees were gathered in this temple mainly during festival.

== Gallery ==
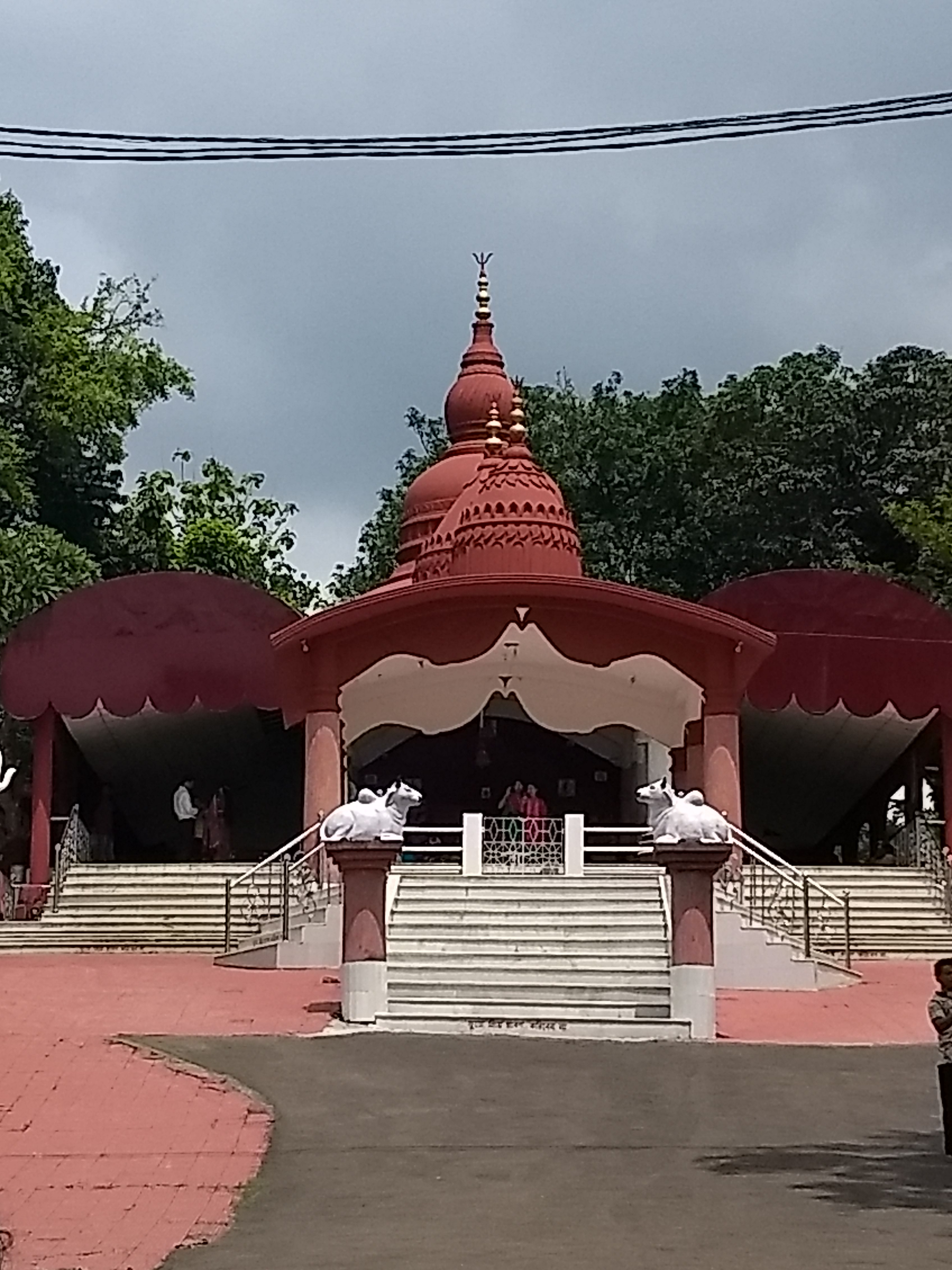

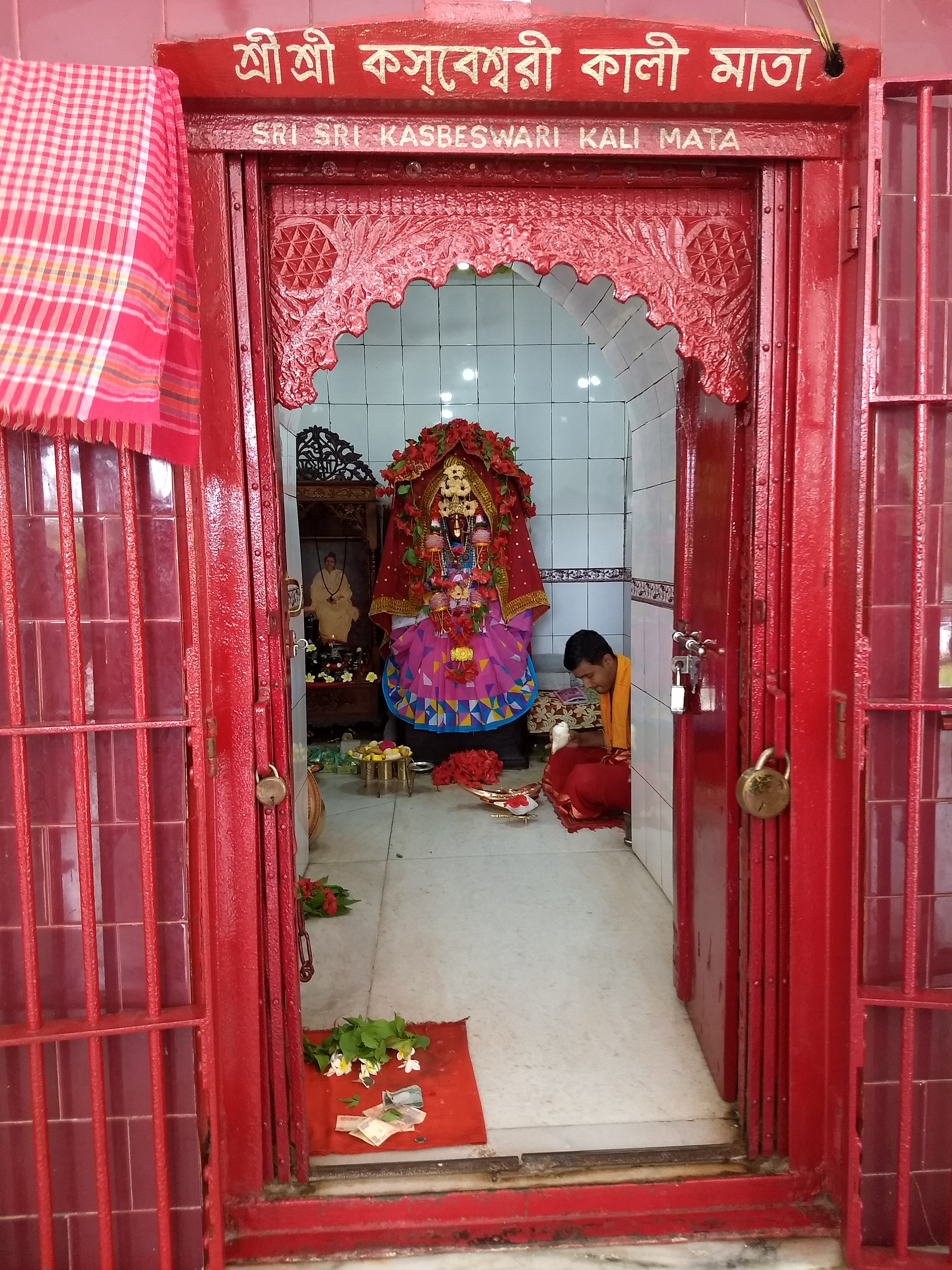

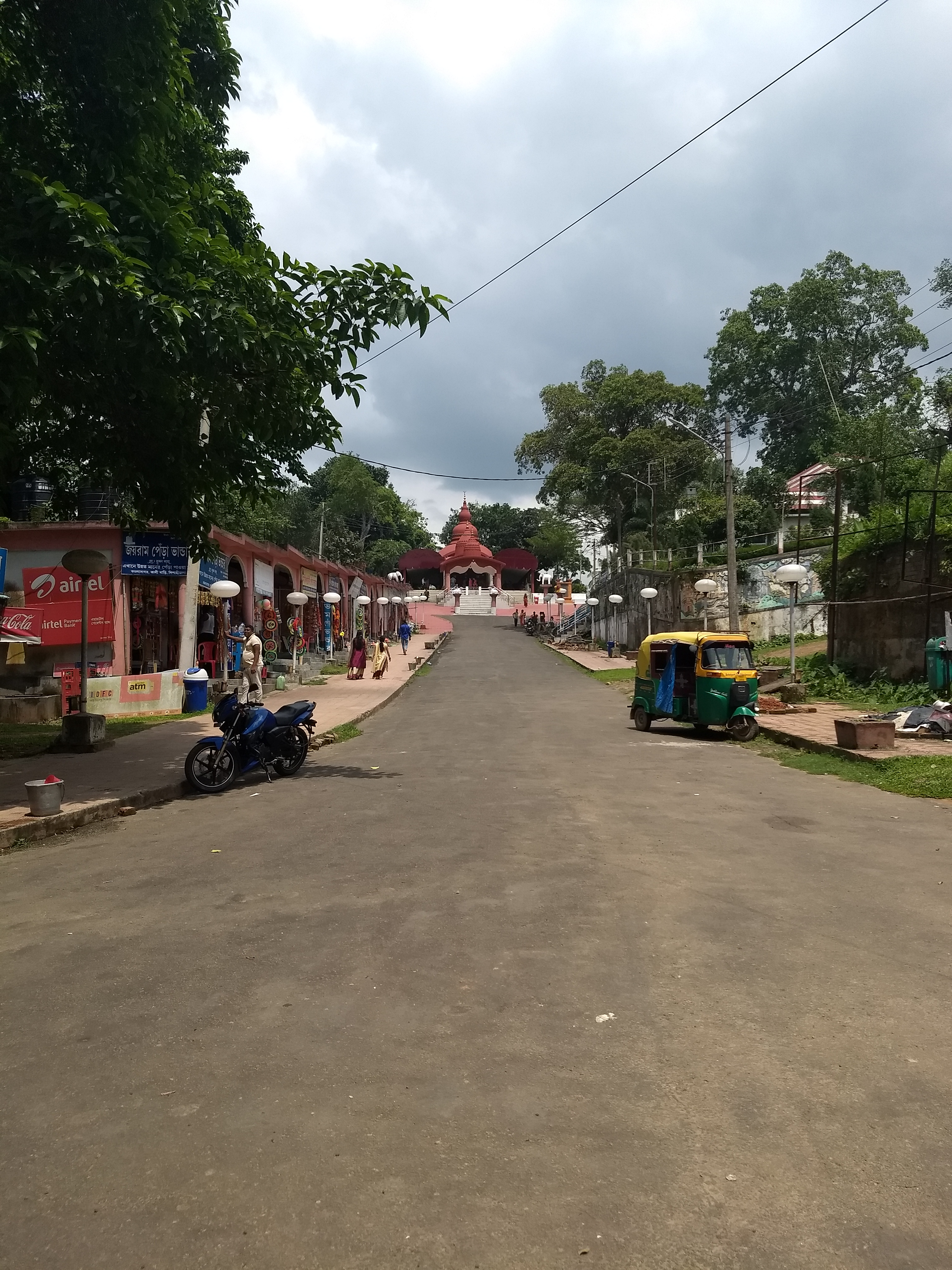

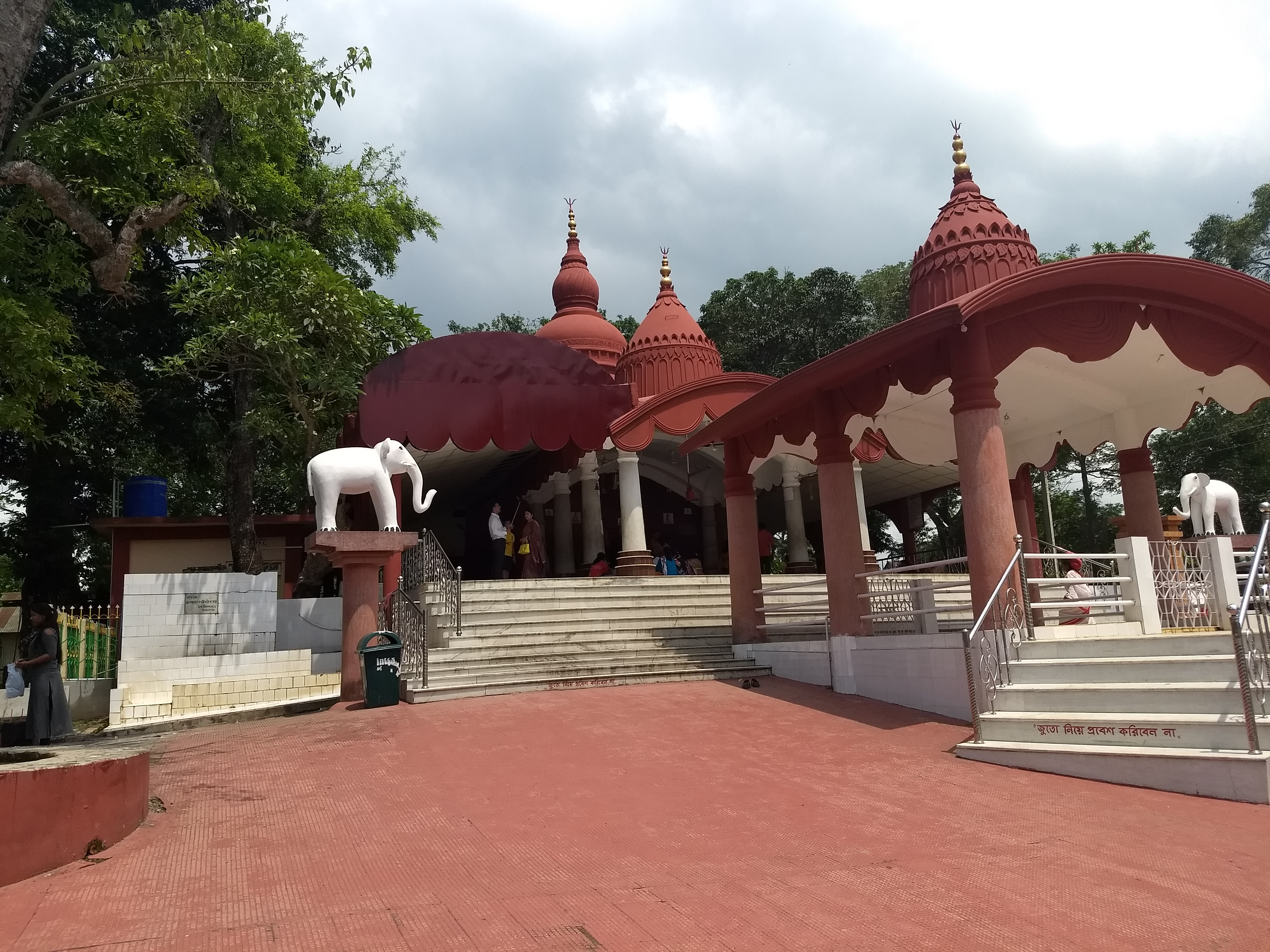

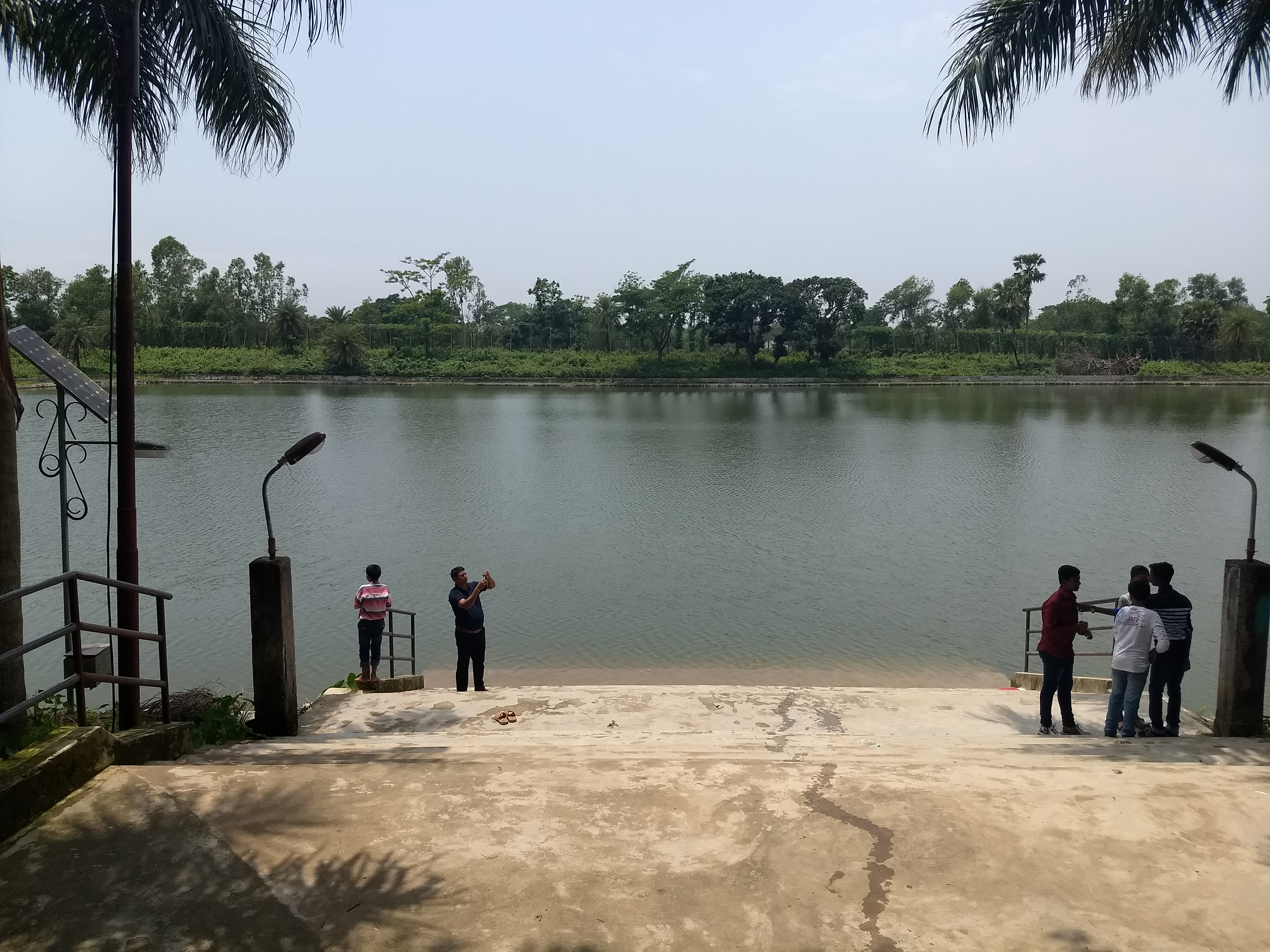
