= Navaratri =

Hindu festival to honour goddess Durga

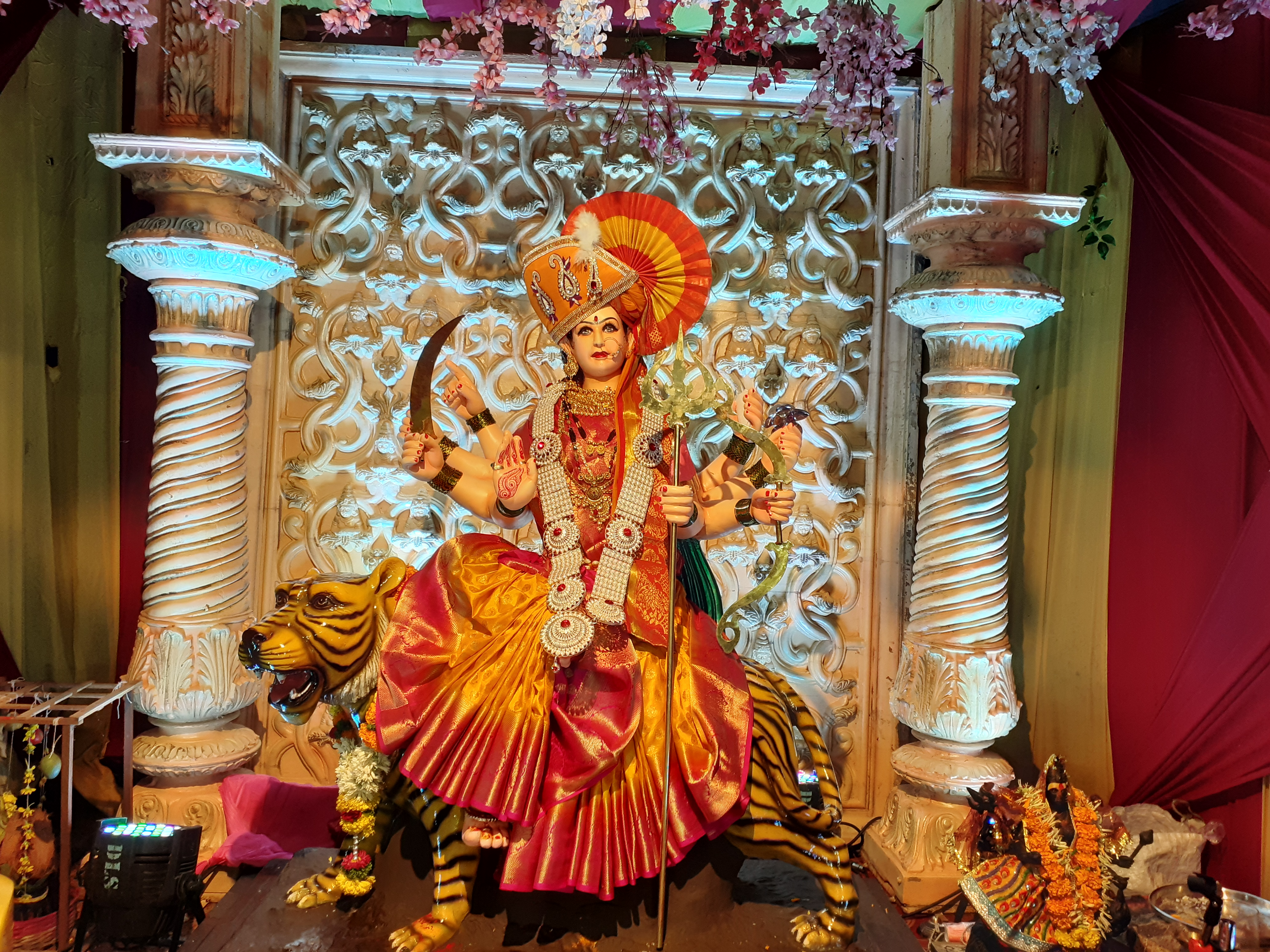
- Murti of Durga upon a tiger during Navaratri, Pune
- Also called: Navratri; Navaratram; Nauratha; Nauratri; Navarathri; Navaratra; Naraate; Naurate; Navratan; Naurata; Nauraat; Nawaraatar; Durga Puja; Sharad Utsav; Dashain; Mohani; Garbotsav; Devi Paksha; Bathukamma; Sanjhi; Gombe Habba; Golu
- Observed by: Hindus
- Type: Hindu
- Significance: Honors the nine forms of Goddess Durga, known as Navadurga
- Celebrations: 9 nights
- Observances: Socio-cultural programmes; Prayer; Fasting; Puja; Pandal visiting; Idol immersion; Bonfire prayers are offered to goddess Durga and Parvati
- Date: multi-day
- 2026 date: Vasanta: 19 March (Thursday) – 27 March (Friday); Sharada: 11 October (Sunday) – 19 October (Monday)
- Duration: 9 nights
- Frequency: Annual
- Related to: Durga Ashtami, Navami, Vijayadashami, Dashain, Durga Puja, Garba, Vidyarambham, Sanjhi, Golu (festival), Bathukamma, Ramlila, Mohani

Explanatory note on Hindu festival dates
- The Hindu calendar is lunisolar but most festival dates are specified using the lunar portion of the calendar. A lunar day is uniquely identified by three calendar elements: māsa (lunar month), pakṣa (lunar fortnight) and tithi (lunar day). Furthermore, when specifying the masa, one of two traditions are applicable, viz. amānta / pūrṇimānta. If a festival falls in the waning phase of the moon, these two traditions identify the same lunar day as falling in two different (but successive) masa. A lunar year is shorter than a solar year by about eleven days. As a result, most Hindu festivals occur on different days in successive years on the Gregorian calendar.

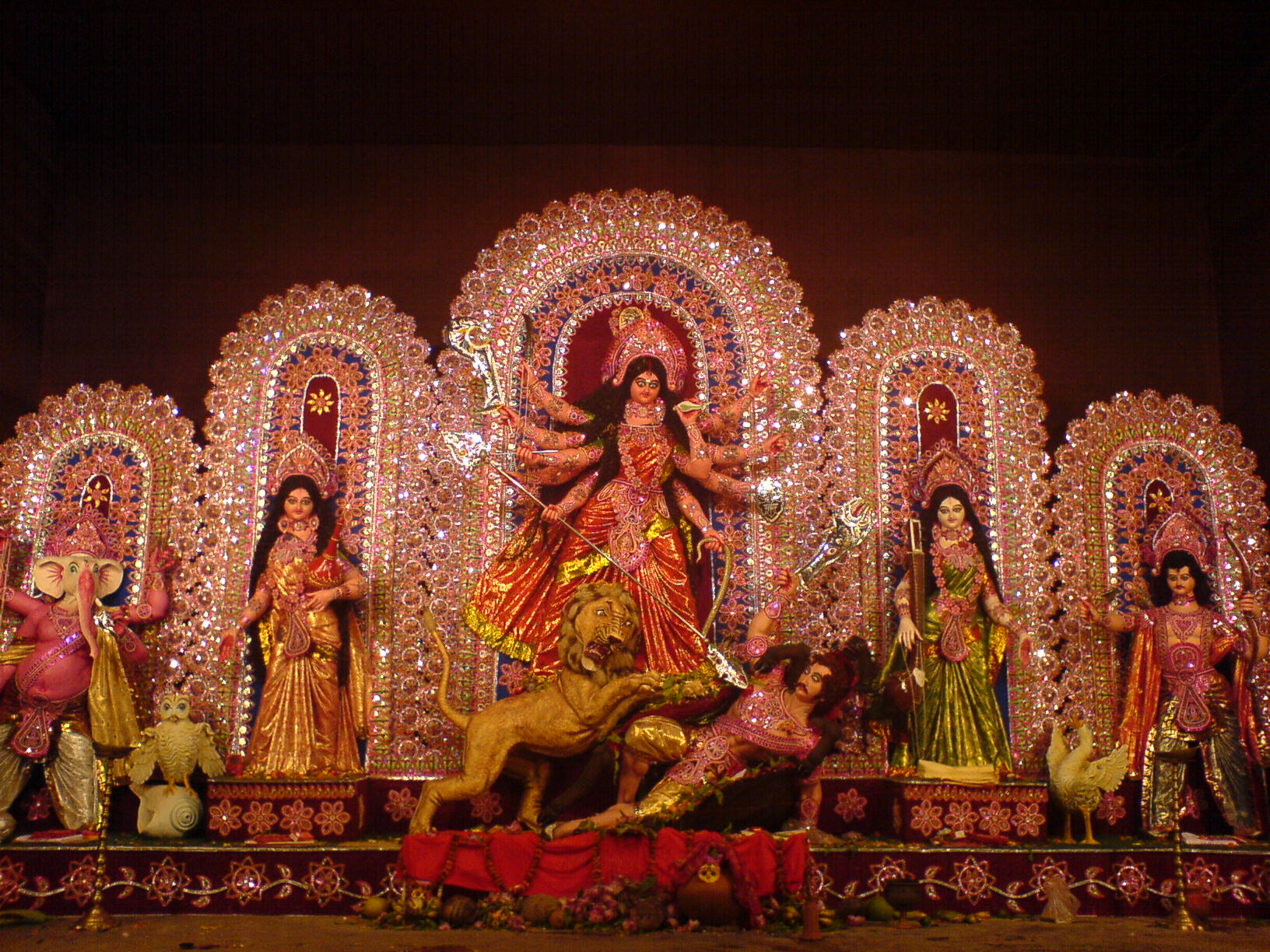
Durga Puja pandal

Navaratri (Note: Also spelled Navratri, Nauratri, Navarathri, Navaratra, Navratam, Nauratam, Naraate or Navaratram) (Sanskrit: नवरात्रि, romanized: Navarātri) is an annual Hindu festival that honours Shakti, the divine feminine power in Hinduism, through the worship of the nine forms of Goddess Durga, over a period of nine nights. The festival is celebrated in varying ways across the Hindu Indian cultural sphere.

Theoretically, there are four seasonal Navaratris; Magha Gupta Navaratri in the month of Magha (January/February of the Gregorian calendar), in the month of Chaitra (March/April ), in the month of Ashadha (June/July), and in the month of Ashvin (September/October). However, in practice, it is the post-monsoon autumn navratri in the month of Ashvin (September/October) called Sharada Navaratri that is celebrated with great pomp.

== Etymology ==
The word Navaratri is a compound of two Sanksrit words, nava, meaning 'nine', and ratri, meaning 'night'. Together the word means 'nine nights'.

== Dates and celebrations ==
In the eastern and northeastern states of India, the Durga Puja is synonymous with Navaratri, wherein goddess Durga battles and emerges victorious over the buffalo demon Mahishasura to help restore dharma. In southern states, the victory of Durga or Kali is celebrated. In the western state of Gujarat, Navaratri celebrations are constituted by arti, followed by garba. In all cases, the common theme is the battle and victory of good over evil based on a regionally famous epic or legend such as the Devi Mahatmya.

=== Celebrations ===
Celebrations include worshipping the nine goddesses during the nine days, stage decorations, recital of the legend, enacting of the story, and chanting of the scriptures of Hinduism. The nine days are also a major crop season cultural event, such as competitive design and staging of pandals, a family visit to these pandals, and the public celebration of classical and folk dances of Hindu culture. Hindu devotees often celebrate Navaratri by fasting.

The Navaratri festival lasts for nine nights, and concludes on the tenth night known as Vijayadashami or Dussehra, which is a celebration of the victory of good over evil. On the final day of Vijayadashami, the statues are either immersed in a water body such as a river or an ocean, or the statue symbolising the evil is burnt with fireworks, marking the destruction of evil. During this time preparations also take place for Deepavali (the festival of lights) which is celebrated twenty days after Vijayadashami.

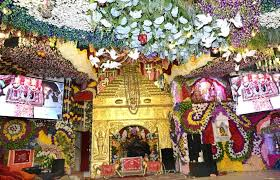
The renowned Hindu pilgrimage site, Vaishno Devi, decorated for the festival of Navaratri.

=== Dates of four Navratris ===
According to some Hindu texts, such as the Shakta and Vaishnava Puranas, Navaratri theoretically falls two or four times in a year. Of these, the Sharada Navaratri near the September equinox (the autumn equinox in September–October) is the most celebrated, and the Vasanta Navaratri near the March equinox (the spring equinox in March–April) is the next most significant to the culture of the Indian subcontinent. In all cases, Navaratri falls in the bright half (waxing phase) of the Hindu lunisolar months. The celebrations vary by region, leaving much to the creativity and preferences of the Hindus.

==== Sharada Navaratri (autumn/most popular) ====
Sharada Navaratri is the most celebrated of the four Navaratri, named after Sharada which means autumn. It commences on the first day (pratipada) of the bright fortnight of the lunar month of Ashvin. The festival is celebrated for nine nights once every year during this month, which typically falls in the Gregorian months of September and October. The exact dates of the festival are determined according to the Hindu lunisolar calendar, and sometimes the festival may be held for a day more or a day less depending on the adjustments for sun and moon movements and the leap year. In many regions, the festival falls after the autumn harvest, and in others, during harvest.

The festivities extend beyond goddess Durga and various other goddesses such as Saraswati and Lakshmi. Deities such as Ganesha, Kartikeya, Shiva, and Parvati are regionally revered. For example, a notable pan-Hindu tradition during Navaratri is the adoration of Saraswati, the Hindu goddess of knowledge, learning, music, and arts, through Ayudha Puja. On this day, which typically falls on the ninth day of Navaratri, peace and knowledge is celebrated. Warriors thank, decorate, and worship their weapons, offering prayers to Saraswati. Musicians upkeep, play, and pray their musical instruments. Farmers, carpenters, smiths, pottery makers, shopkeepers, and all sorts of tradespeople similarly decorate and worship their equipment, machinery, and tools of trade. Students visit their teachers, express respect, and seek their blessings. This tradition is particularly strong in South India, but is observed elsewhere too.

==== Chaitra Navaratri (spring) ====
Chaitra Navaratri, also called Vasantha Navaratri, is the second most celebrated Navaratri, named after vasanta which means spring. It is observed during the lunar month of Chaitra (March–April). The festival is devoted to goddess Durga, whose nine forms are worshipped on nine days. The last day is also Rama Navami, the birthday of Rama. For this reason, it is also called Rama Navaratri by some people.

In many regions, the festival falls after spring harvest, and in others, during harvest. It also marks the first day of the Hindu lunisolar calendar, also known as the Hindu Lunar New Year, according to the Vikram Samvat calendar.

Chaitra Navaratri is called Navreh by the Kashmiri Pandits, Gudi Padwa in Maharashtra and Ugadi in Andhra Pradesh, Telangana and Karnataka.

==== Magha Navaratri/secret Navratri (January–February) ====
Magha Navaratri is observed during the lunar month of Magha (January–February). This Navaratri is also known as Gupt (secret) Navaratri. The fifth day of this festival is often independently observed as Vasant Panchami or Basant Panchami, the official start of spring in the Hindu tradition, where in goddess Saraswati is revered through arts, music, writing, and kite flying. In some regions, the Hindu god of love, Kama is revered. Magha Navaratri is observed regionally or by individuals.

==== Ashada Navaratri /secret Navratri (June–July) ====
Ashada Navaratri, also known as Gupta Navaratri, is observed during the lunar month of Ashadha (June–July), during the start of the monsoon season. Ashada Navaratri is observed regionally or by individuals.

=== Cuisine ===
Fasting is common during the nine days of Navaratri. There are many different fasts observed such as the water fast or fruit only fast. Some eat only one meal per day. Many observers eat vegetable dishes and avoid meat, eggs, alcohol, onions, garlic, wheat flour, rice flour, and canned foods.

== Nine forms of Durga ==
The festival is associated to the prominent battle that took place between Goddess Durga and the demon Mahishasura to celebrate the victory of good over evil. These nine days are solely dedicated to Goddess Durga and her nine avatars – the Navadurga. The specific forms of navadurga are extracted from the Devikavaca, a subsection of the Devipurana text and representative of a major aspect in the life of the goddess, Parvati. Each day is associated to an incarnation of the goddess:

=== Day 1 – Shailaputri ===
Pratipada, also known as the first day, is associated with the form Shailaputri ("Daughter of Mountain"), an incarnation of Goddess Parvati. It is in this form that Goddess Durga is worshipped as the daughter of Himavan (the Guardian God of Himalaya). She is depicted as riding the bull, Nandi, with a trishula in her right hand and lotus flower in her left. Goddess Shailaputri is considered to be the direct incarnation of Mahakali. The colour of the day is yellow, which depicts action and vigor. She is also considered to be a reincarnation of Sati (Shiva's first wife, who then reincarnates as Parvati) and is also known as Hemavati.

=== Day 2 – Brahmacharini ===
On Dwitiya (second day), Goddess Brahmacharini ("Unmarried One"), another incarnation of Goddess Parvati, is worshipped. In this form, Goddess Parvati became Yogini, her unmarried self. Goddess Brahmacharini is worshipped for emancipation or moksha and endowment of peace and prosperity. Depicted as walking bare feet and holding a rudrakshmala (japmala) and a kamandala (water pot) in her hands, she symbolizes bliss and calm. White is the colour code of this day. The orange colour which depicts tranquility is sometimes used so that strong energy flows everywhere.

=== Day 3 – Chandraghanta ===
Tritiya (third day) commemorates the worship of Chandraghanta – the name derived from the fact that after marrying God Shiva, Goddess Parvati adorned her forehead with the ardhachandra (lit. half-moon). She is the embodiment of beauty and is also symbolic of bravery. Grey is the colour of the third day, which is a vivacious colour and can cheer up everyone's mood.

=== Day 4 – Kushmanda ===
Goddess Kushmanda is worshipped on Chaturthi (fourth day). Believed to be the creative power of the universe, Goddess Kushmanda is associated with the endowment of vegetation on earth, and hence, the colour of the day is green. She is depicted as having eight arms and sits on a tiger.

=== Day 5 – Skandamata ===
Skandamata, the goddess worshipped on Panchami (fifth day), is the mother of God Skanda (or Kartikeya). The green colour is symbolic of the transforming strength of a mother when her child is confronted with danger. She is depicted riding a ferocious lion, having four arms, and holding her baby.

=== Day 6 – Katyayani ===
Born to sage Katyayana, she is an incarnation of Goddess Durga which killed the buffalo-demon, Mahisaura and is shown to exhibit courage which is symbolized by the colour red. Known as the warrior goddess, she is considered one of the most violent forms of Devi. In this avatar, Goddess Katyayani rides a lion and has four hands. She is celebrated on Shashti (sixth day). In eastern India, Maha Shashti is observed on this day and starting of shardiya Durga Puja.

=== Day 7 – Kalaratri ===
Considered the most ferocious form of Goddess Durga, Kalaratri is revered on saptami. It is believed that Goddess Parvati removed her pale skin to kill the asuras Shumbha and Nishumbha. The colour of the day is royal blue. The goddess is depicted in a red-coloured attire or tiger skin with enraged and fiery eyes and dark skin. The red colour is believed to represent prayer and assurance of the goddess's protection to the devotees from harm.

=== Day 8 – Mahagauri ===
Mahagauri symbolizes intelligence and peace. It is believed when Goddess Kaalaratri took a bath in the Ganga river, she gained a warmer complexion. The colour associated with this day is pink which depicts optimism. She is celebrated on Ashtami (eighth day). In eastern India, Maha Astami is observed on this day and starting with pushpanjali, kumari puja etc. It is a very important tithi and considered as the birthday of Mahishasura mardini rupa of Chandi.

=== Day 9 – Siddhidatri ===
On the last day of the festival also known as Navami (ninth day), people pray to Siddhidhatri ("Giver of Perfection"). Sitting on a lotus, she is believed to possess and bestows all types of Siddhis. She mainly bestows eight types of siddhis–anima (the ability to reduce one's body to the size of an atom), mahima (the ability to expand one's body to an infinitely large size), garima (the ability to become heavy or dense), laghima (the ability to become weightless or lighter than air), prapti (the ability to realize whatever one desires), prakamya (the ability to access any place in the world), isitva (the ability to control all material elements or natural forces) and vasitva (the ability to force influence upon anyone). Here, she has four hands. Also known as Goddess Mahalakshmi, The purple colour of the day portrays an admiration towards nature's beauty. Goddess Siddhidatri is Parvati, the wife of Shiva. Goddess Siddhidhatri is also seen as the Ardhanarishvara form of God Shiva and Goddess Shakti. It is believed that one side of God Shiva's body is that of Goddess Siddhidatri. Therefore, he is also known by the name of Ardhanarishwara. According to Vedic scriptures, God Shiva attained all the siddhis by worshipping this goddess.

In most parts of India, tools and weapons are worshipped in a ritual called Ayudha Puja. Many businesses also grant a holiday to their employees on this day.

=== Day 10 – Dussehra or Vijayadashami ===
Vijayadashami is observed for different reasons and celebrated differently in various parts of the Indian subcontinent. In the southern, eastern, northeastern, and some northern states of India, Vijayadashami marks the end of Durga Puja, commemorating Goddess Durga's victory against the buffalo-demon Mahishasura to restore and protect dharma.

Dussehra, in Hinduism, is a holiday marking the triumph of Lord Rama, an avatar of Lord Vishnu, over the 10-headed demon king Ravana, who abducted Lord Rama's wife, Sita. The festival's name is derived from the Sanskrit words dasha ("ten") and hara ("defeat"). Symbolizing the victory of good over evil, Dussehra is celebrated on the 10th day of the month of Ashvina (September–October), the seventh month of the Hindu calendar, with the appearance of the full moon, an event called the "bright fortnight" (shukla paksha). Dussehra coincides with the culmination of the nine-day Navratri festival and with the tenth day of the Durga Puja festival. For many, it marks the beginning of preparation for Diwali, which occurs 20 days after Dussehra.

== Regional practices ==
Navaratri is celebrated in different ways throughout India. Certain people revere different aspects of Durga and some people fast while others feast. The Chaitra Navaratri culminates in Ram Navami and the Sharada Navaratri culminates in Durga Puja and Vijayadashami.

In the past, Shakta Hindus used to recite Durga's legends during the Chaitra Navaratri around the spring equinox . For most contemporary Hindus, it is the Navaratri around the autumn equinox that is the major festival and the one observed. To Bengali Hindus and to Shakta Hindus outside of eastern and northeastern states of India, the term Navaratri implies Durga Puja in the warrior goddess aspect of Devi. In other traditions of Hinduism, the term Navaratri implies the celebration of Durga but in her more peaceful forms, such as Saraswati – the Hindu goddess of knowledge, learning, music, and other arts. In Nepal, Navaratri is called Dashain, and is a major annual homecoming and family event that celebrates the bonds between elders and youngsters with Tika Puja, as well as across family and community members.

=== Bengal, Assam, and Odisha ===
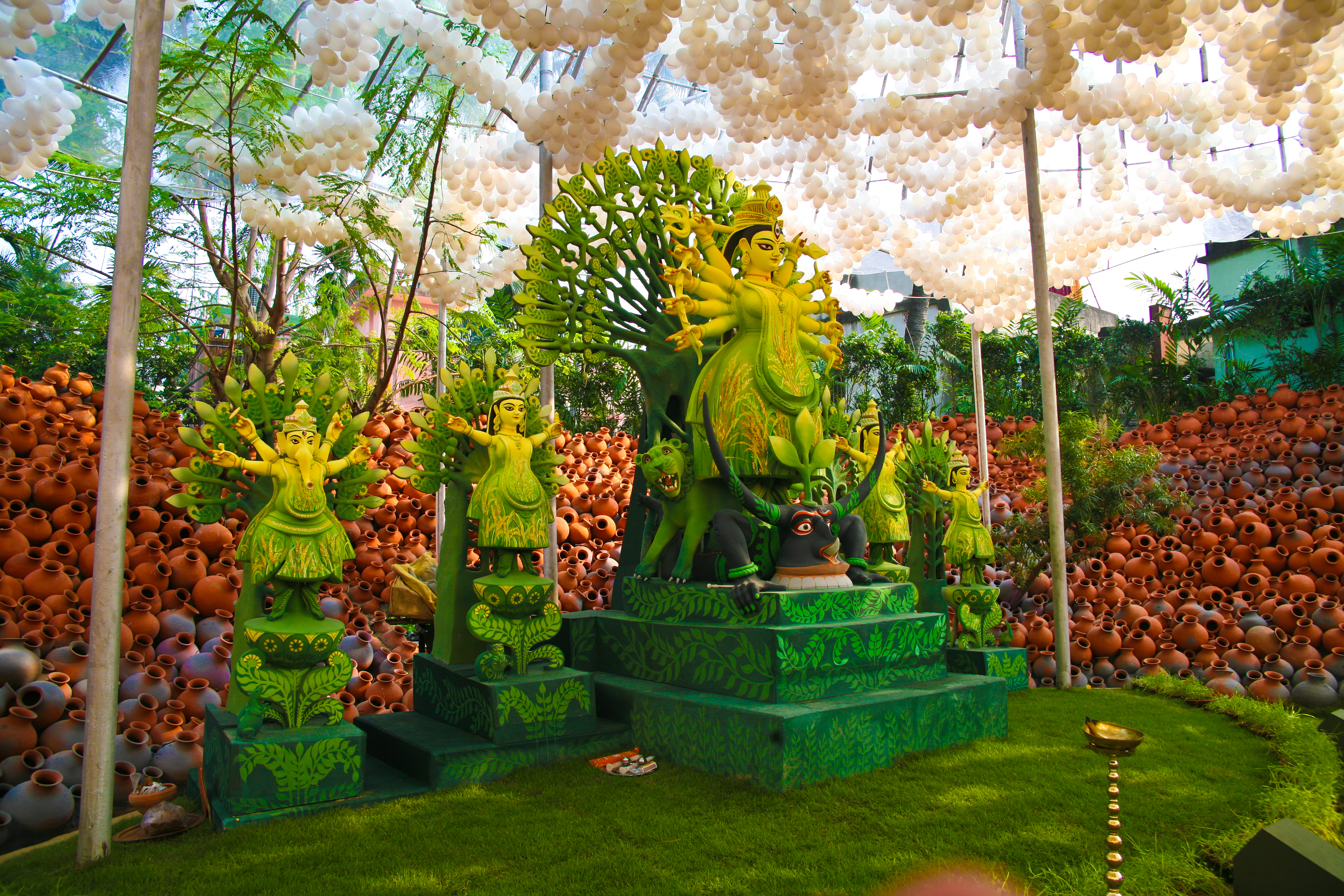
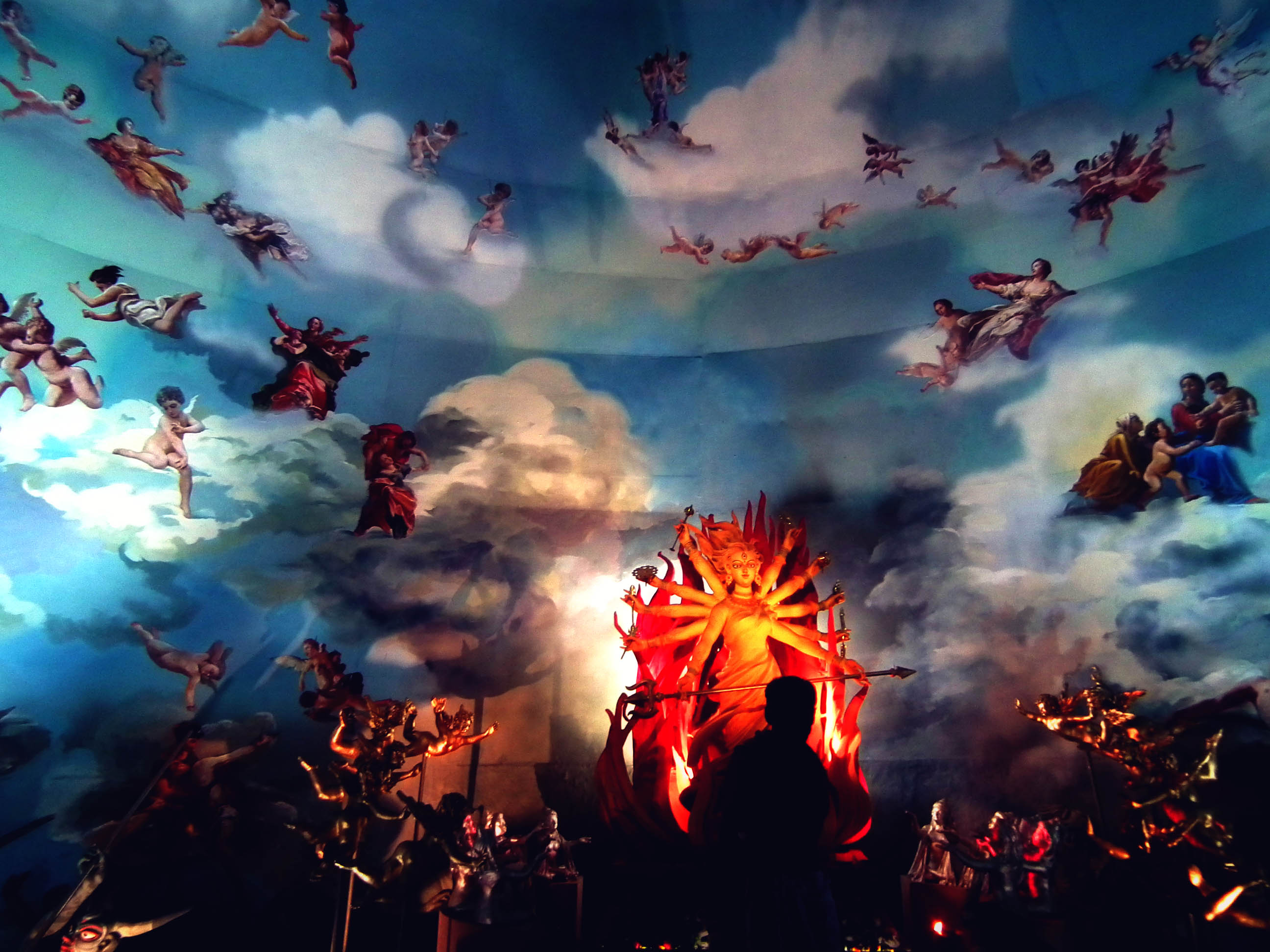
Two Durga Puja pandals in Kolkata during Navaratri

Navaratri is celebrated as the Durga Puja festival by Bengali Hindus, Assamese people, Odia people, and Tripuri people of the eastern Indian subcontinent. It is also celebrated by large numbers of people belonging to the Bihari cultures including the Bhojpuri people, Maithili people, Nagpuria people, Magahi people, and Madheshi people, as well as some minor tribal ethnicities in Bangladesh and India such as Santal people, Chakma people, Manipuri people and others. It is the most important annual festival to Bengali Hindus and a major social and public event in the eastern and northeastern states of India, where it dominates the religious life. The occasion is celebrated with thousands of pandals (temporary stages) that are built in community squares, roadside shrines, and large Durga temples in West Bengal, Odisha, Jharkhand, Bihar, eastern Nepal, Assam, Tripura, and nearby regions. It is also observed by some Shakta Hindus as a private, home-based festival. Durga Puja festival marks the victory of the goddess Durga in the battle against the shape-shifting, deceptive, and powerful buffalo demon Mahishasura.

The festival begins with Mahalaya, a day where Bengali, Assamese, and Odia Hindus remember the loved ones who have died, as well the advent of the warrior goddess Durga. The next significant day of Durga Puja is called Shashthi, on which the local community welcomes the goddess Durga and festive celebrations are inaugurated. On the seventh (Saptami), eighth (Ashtami), and ninth (Navami) day, Durga, along with Lakshmi, Saraswati, Ganesha, and Kartikeya, are revered. These days mark the main Puja (worship) which is performed by the recitation of scriptures, legends of Durga in the Devi Mahatmya, and social visits by families to temples and pandals. The clay idols of Durga, Lakshmi, Saraswati, Ganesha, and Kartikeya are worked on and sculpted for months before Durga Puja by artisans. The process of making the idols begins with a puja to Ganesha and invocations of divinities into the bamboo frames of the idols. Clay or alluvial soil is usually chosen to sculpt the idols for Durga Puja. In some regions of Bengal, it is customary to obtain the clay from nishiddho pallis or "forbidden territories" such as brothels or red light areas due to the belief that Durga resides everywhere in the form of creative energy. After the idols are completed and painted, the artisans add a layer of jute over the idols to prevent any cracks or damage. Kumortuli, a traditional potters' quarter in Kolkata is renowned for its community of clay sculptors who craft traditional Bengali idols for festivals like Durga Puja and Saraswati Puja.

The sixth day of Navaratri or Shashthi is celebrated by Bengali, Assamese, and Odia Hindus as Bilva Nimantran, the day of inviting and awakening the goddess Durga. The Akal Bodhan ritual done on this day consists of installing a kalash filled with water at the base of a Bilva tree. Durga is then invoked in a rite called the Avahana. After the Avahana rite, Durga is symbolically invited and invoked to dwell in the Bilva tree in a rite called the Adhivas. Then, an invitation is symbolically given to Durga with mantras and offerings to accept the Nabapatrika Puja and dwell into the consecrated idol during the Pranapratishta rite on the next day.

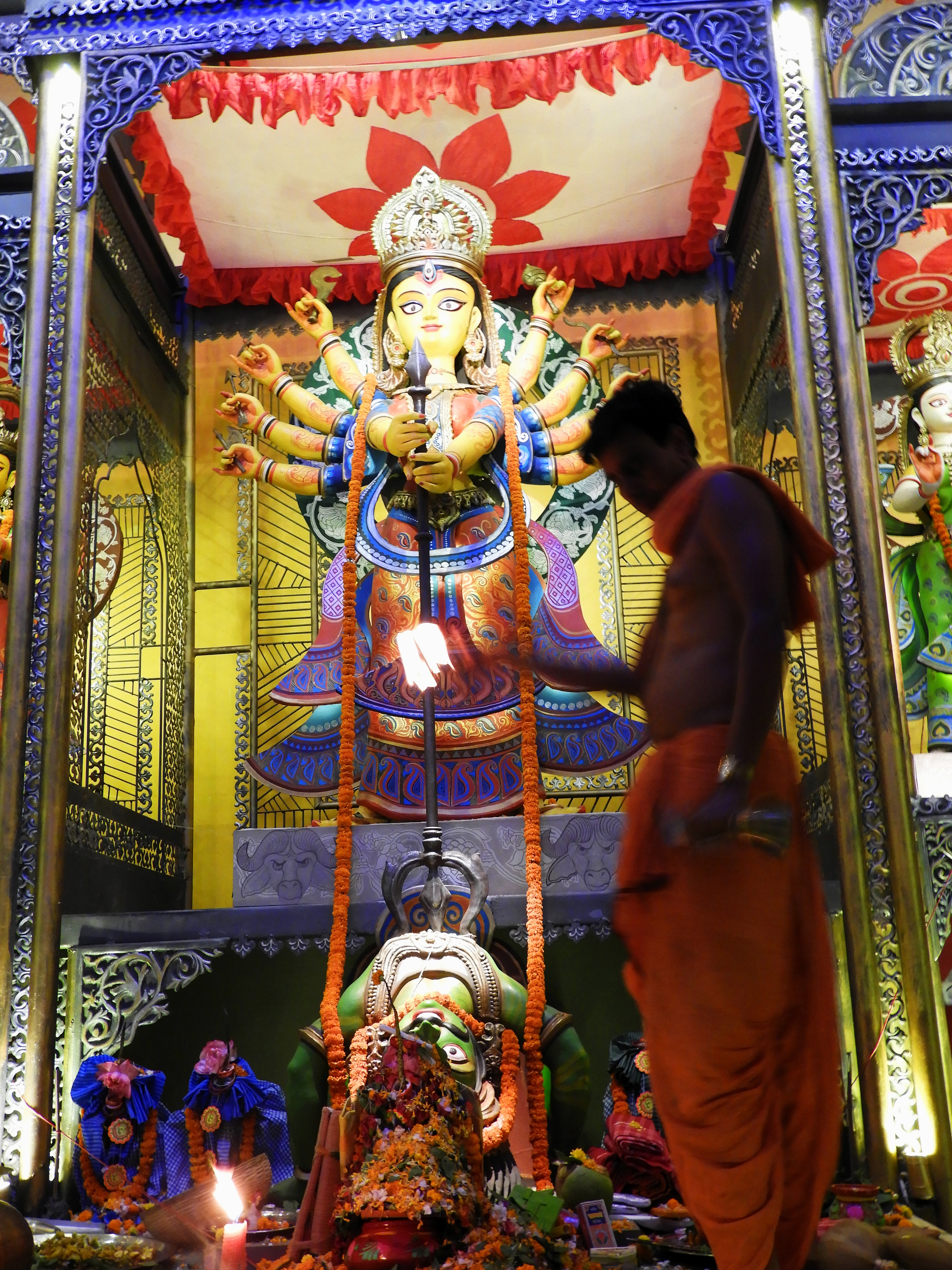
A Bengali Hindu priest performing worship of the consecrated Durga idol on the day of Maha Saptami in Kolkata.

On the seventh day of Navaratri or Maha Saptami, Durga is invoked into nine plants during a rite called the Nabapatrika Puja which is also known as the Kolabou Puja. The rite involves the bundling of nine different plants and then ceremonially washed in a river or temple tank. The bundle is then adorned with a red or orange cloth and then installed on the right side of Durga’s idol. After the instalment of the bundle of nine plants and a mirror near the idol of Durga, the Pranapratishta rite begins. During the Pranapratishta rite, Durga is invoked to reside in the consecrated idol. After these rituals on Maha Saptami, the lavish festivities and rituals of Durga Puja begin.

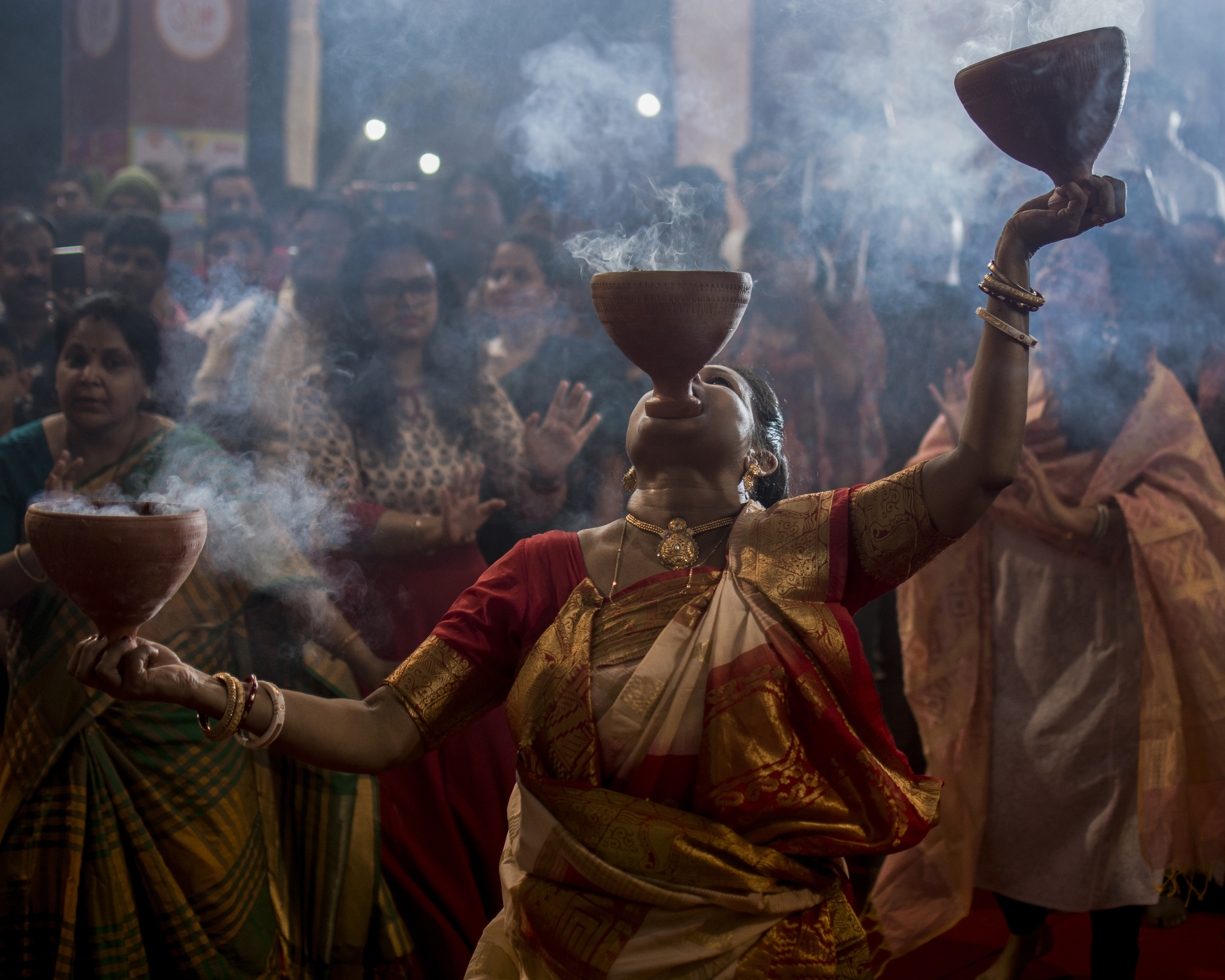
A Bengali woman performing Dhunuchi Nritya by balancing the dhunachis in her hands and mouth as onlookers watch.

The festival of Durga Puja is always celebrated with traditional music and dance. The dhak, a large drum instrument from Bengal is played during the aarati during Durga Puja. The kansor ghanta, a brass plate is usually banged with a hammer to accompany the dhak during the aarati. During the playing of the dhak drum, Bengali devotees perform a dance called the Dhunuchi Nritya in which a dhunachi or incense burner is balanced in the hands. Devotees wear traditional Bengali clothes during Durga Puja which consists of the white garad or tant sarees with a red border for women and the kurta and dhoti for men.

The eighth day or Durga Ashtami is a highly important day of rituals and rites during Durga Puja. On Durga Ashtami, nine pots are installed near the altar and are invoked as the nine forms of Durga. Nine young girls wearing red with a papier-mache crown are worshipped as the nine forms of Durga in a rite called Kumari Puja on this day. The devotees or hosts of the puja wash the feet of the girls, adorn the girls with red alta and sindoor, gift one flower from the Durga idol to the girls each, and worship the girls with aarati, dhoop, and mantras. After the puja, the girls are gifted new clothes and jewellery by the hosts and then fed. Durga Ashtami is also the day when Sandhi Puja is conducted at the most auspicious hour of Durga Puja. The muhurta of Sandhi Puja is regarded to be the time when Chamunda killed the demons Chanda and Munda thus making it a period of extreme strength and energy according to Hindu astrology. During Sandhi Puja, the devotees or hosts light 108 diyas or lamps, offer 108 lotus flowers, 108 garlands of bael leaves, a new saree, new jewellery, and new fruits to the goddess Durga. The puja is performed with the accompaniment of the dhak, shankha, kansor ghanta, and ululudhvani. Ululudhvani is the Bengali, Assamese, and Odia tradition of women ululating; making a long, wavering high-pitched sound with the rapid movement of their tongue. Holy water is then sprinkled on the hosts and attendees by the priests, a Maha Aarati is performed, and the puja is culminated with a homa. Animal sacrifices in a rite called Durga Balidan were prominent during Sandhi Puja in earlier times but has largely been replaced by symbolic sacrifices of pumpkins and other fruits and vegetables in the modern times.

The ninth day or Maha Navami, a homa is performed while all 700 verses from the Durga Saptashati are read. An elaborate homa is conducted and offerings of ghee, coconut, sesame seeds, grains, and herbs are poured into the fire. This rite is called the Chandi Homa. Prasad of Sattvic standards is prepared and offered to the goddess on Navami in a rite called Bhog. The prasad usually consists of khichdi and other vegetarian dishes such as dal.

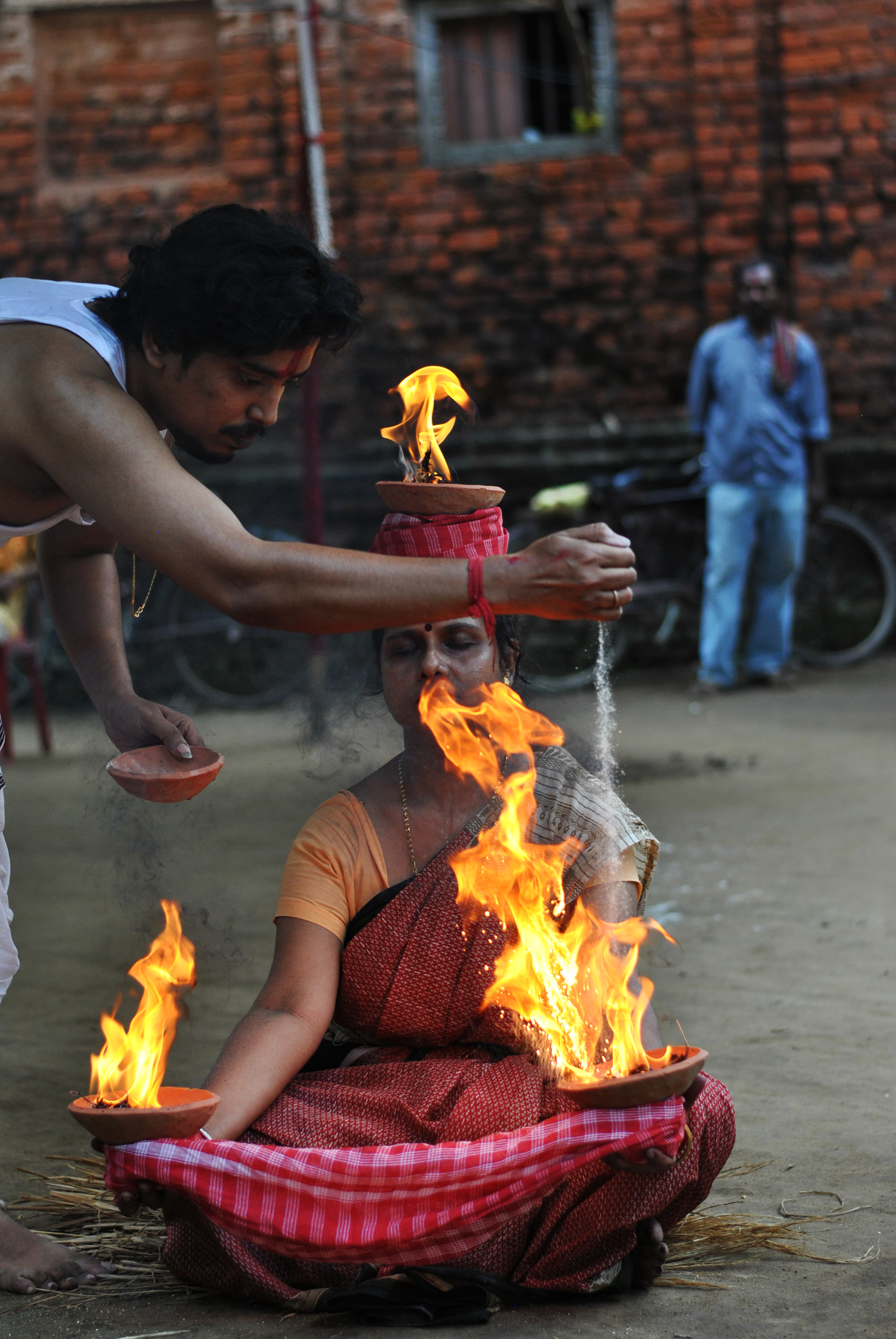
A woman performing the Dhuno Purano ritual during Durga Puja.

A fire ritual performed by Bengali Hindu women on Maha Navami called Dhuno Porano involves a woman sitting cross-legged in a wet cotton sari. A clay vessel on top of a wet lump of mud is placed in each hand and on top of the woman's head. The three clay vessels contain embers which are lit after being placed on the woman. Flames burst from the three clay vessels while the woman must sit calmly and meditate upon the goddess. The ritual is performed in front of the Durga idol at a pandal or temple and it symbolizes purification and dedication through strong devotion.

On the tenth day, also known as Vijayadashami, a great procession is held where clay statues of Durga are ceremoniously walked to a river or ocean coast for a solemn goodbye. Many mark their faces with vermilion (sindooram) or dress in red clothes. It is an emotional day for some devotees, and the congregation sings emotional goodbye songs. After the procession and immersion of the idols in water, Hindus distribute sweets, gifts, and visit their friends and family members.

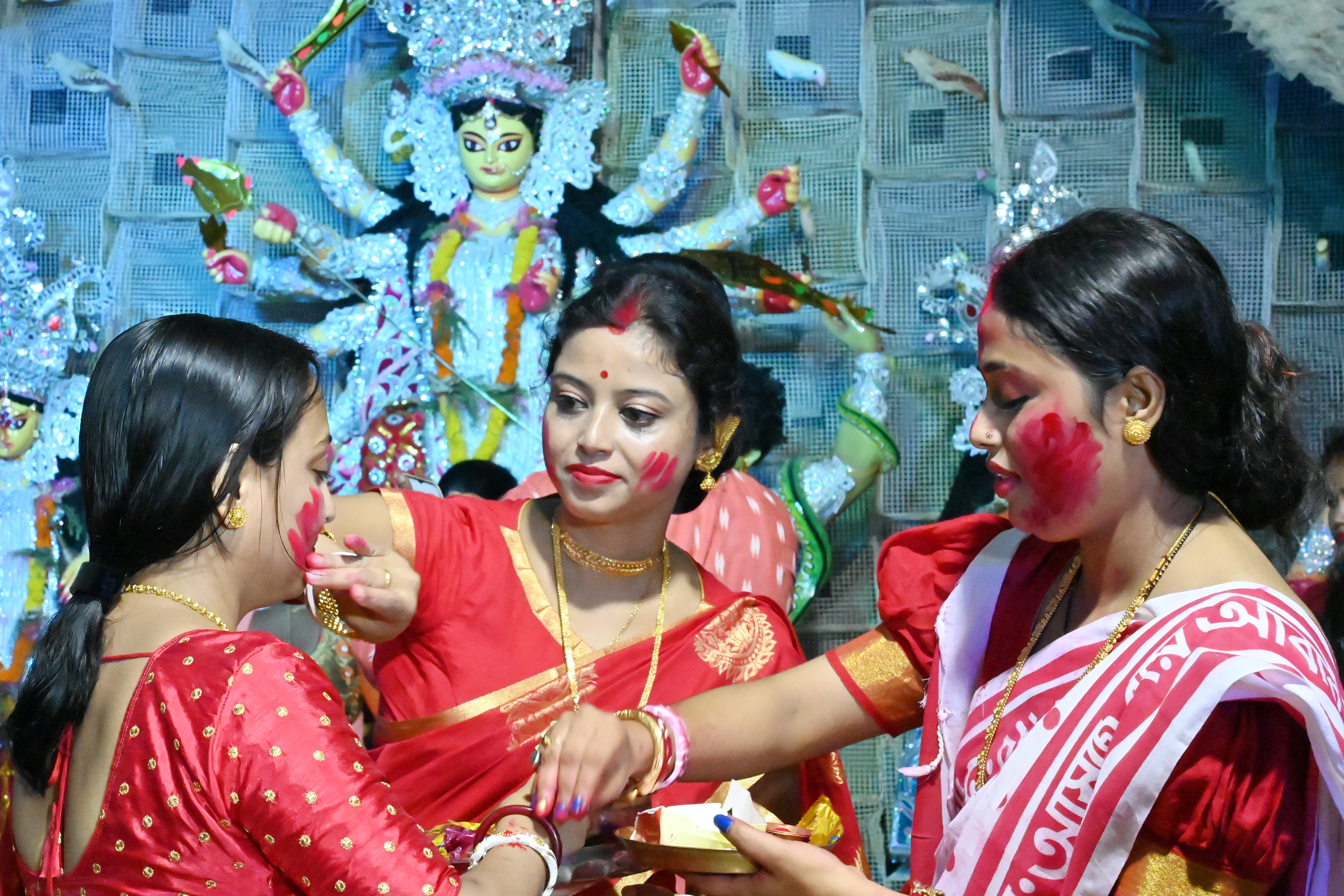
A group of women joyfully smearing themselves with sindoor (vermillion) during Vijayadashami.

Sindur khela is an important tradition for women on the day of Vijayadashami. After the final puja of Vijayadashami, married Bengali women anoint the idol of Durga with sindoor. They then apply sindoor to the shankha (conch shell), pala (coral), and noa (iron) bangles. The tradition concludes with the married women smearing each other’s faces with sindoor and exchanging sweets. This tradition of merrymaking amongst women is regarded as an important celebration of womanhood during the final day of Durga Puja.

Durga Puja is celebrated commonly by both Bangladesh's Bengali and non-Bengali Hindu communities. Many Bengali Muslims also take part in the festivities. In Dhaka, the Dhakeshwari Temple puja attracts visitors and devotees.

=== Bihar, Jharkhand, and Purvanchal ===
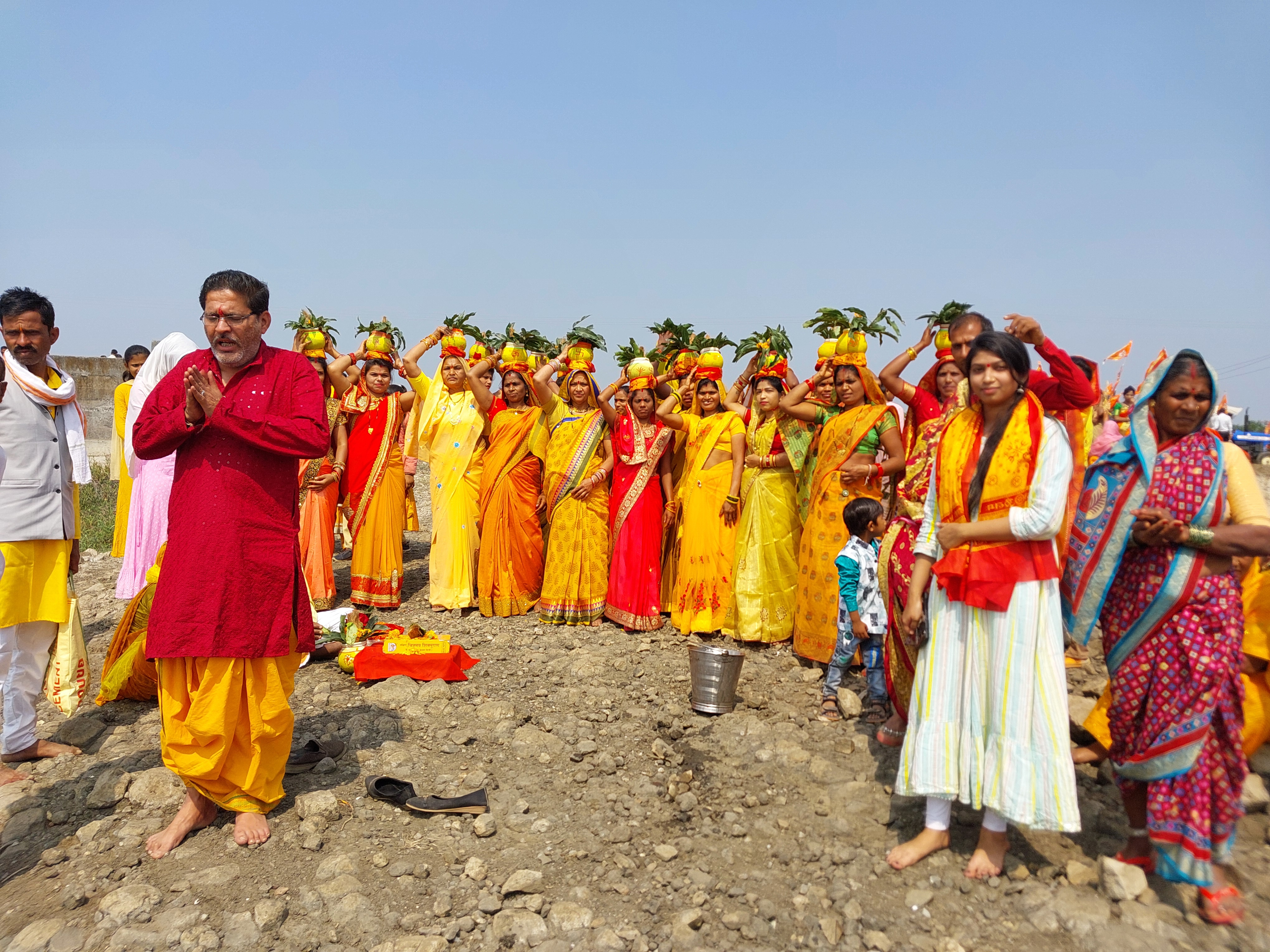
A group of Bihari women carrying kalash pitchers on their head for the festival of Navaratri.

In the greater Bihari cultural region of Bihar, Jharkhand, Purvanchal, and the province of Madhesh in Nepal, Navaratri or Durga Puja begins with the ritual of Kalash Yatra. The main tradition in Bihar, Jharkhand, and Purvanchal on the first day of Navaratri is the Kalash Yatra in which devotees travel to a temple or sacred river or water body to collect water in a kalash. Usually one woman from each family carries the kalash on her head or sometimes, entire villages or colonies travel to collect the water together for a communal Durga Puja. When a kalash is filled with water, it is brought back either to the household shrine or temple by men and women carrying it on their head. On a banana leaf, rice and grains are placed to establish the spot where the kalash will be placed. Over the banana leaf and grains, a large mound of soil and sand is made and then barley seeds are sown in it after being soaked in water. Betel nuts and other sacred offerings are placed into the filled kalash and it is topped with mango leaves and a diya lamp or coconut. The kalash is placed on the center of the soil mound. The kalash is then anointed with kumkum and vermillion. An akhand jyot, a lamp to last all nine days is then lit. The kalash is then worshipped for nine days. A cow dung cake is used each of the nine days to perform a homa or havan.

The worship of Durga in the greater Bihar region during Navaratri involves the offering of flowers such as the aparajita and harsingar. The worship of Shiva is also prominent during Navaratri in the greater Bihar region. In Mithila and other regions of Bihar, very small lingams are made from mud and are worshipped in a rite known as Parthiva Shivalinga Puja. According to the Shiva Purana, the mud lingams or Parthiva Shivalingas should be made from the soil or mud from a holy river or pond.

In the Mithila region of Bihar and Madhesh and also some other regions of Bihar and Jharkhand, women perform a tradition called Jhijhiya from the day of Kalash Sthapana to the day of Dussehra. The tradition of Jhijhiya involves the singing of traditional Jhijhiya songs in Maithili or other Bihari languages and performing the Jhijhiya dance. The first song sung during the tradition are devotional songs dedicated to the mother goddess and the second song sung is for protection against witches and black magic. Folk instruments such as the dhol and manjira to accompany the singing. The Jhijhiya dance is performed by placing an earthen pitcher with multiple holes on their head and dancing in a circle and twirling while singing the Jhijhiya songs. A lamp is lit inside the earthen pitcher causing the pitcher to shimmer as the light escapes through its many holes. A common folk belief states that if a witch is successful in counting all of the holes in the pitcher, the dancer will immediately die. Participating women sometimes go house to house to perform the dance and collect grains and offerings for the day of Dussehra.

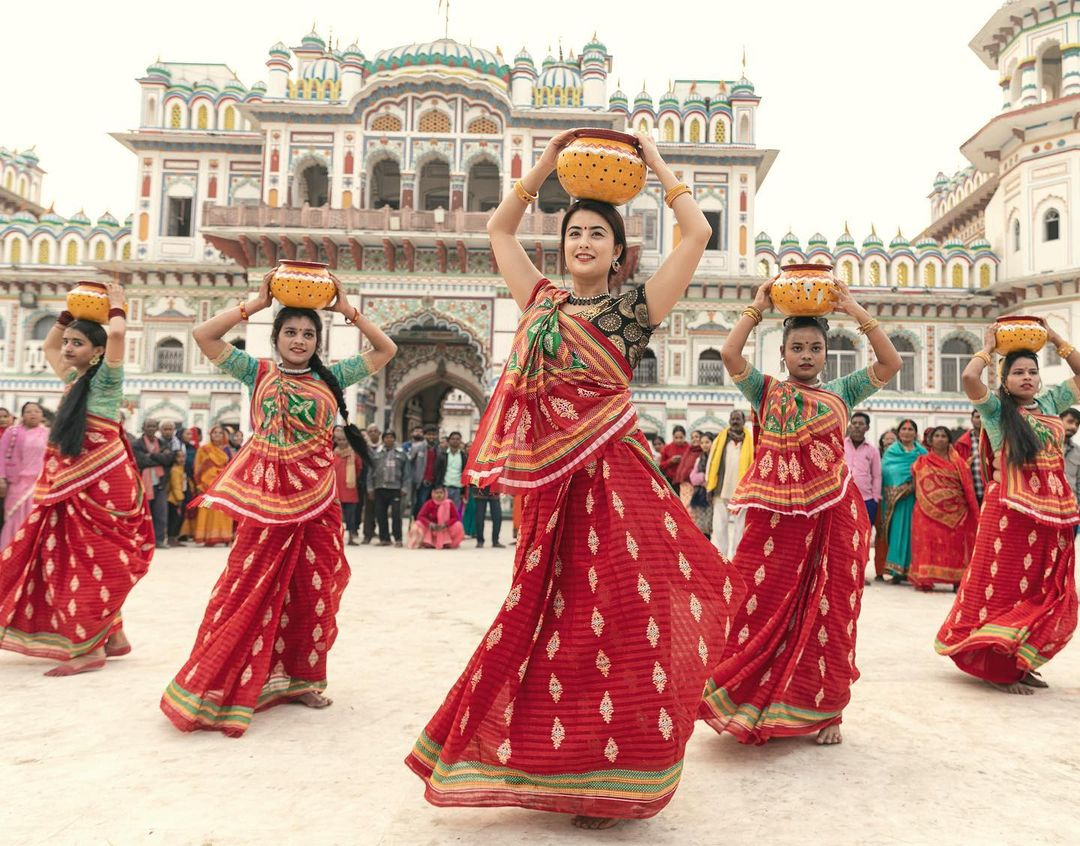
Maithili women performing the Jhjijhiya dance outside the Janaki Mandir in the city of Janakpurdham located in the Mithila region of Nepal.

The Jhijhiya tradition has no documented origin but a commonly told folk story from Mithila links the folk dance and song to witches. According to the Maithili folk story, a queen fell in love with the nephew of her husband. When the nephew rejected the queen's advances, the queen began to fake an illness and tricked her husband into believing that she needed the nephew's blood to survive. The king ordered his soldiers to kill his nephew but when his nephew was captured, the soldiers couldn't bring themselves to kill him so they let the nephew go free in the forest. One day, the king and queen were passing through the forest when one of the royal palanquin carriers died. The king hired his nephew unknowingly as his new palanquin carrier. When the king's nephew began to sing a song that only him and the king knew, the king recognized him immediately. The king and queen both felt guilty and convinced the nephew to return to the capital with them. A powerful witch from the forest who had adopted the nephew became angry that he was leaving her so she began to use her magic on the nephew to kill him. When the queen found out about the witch's attacks, she fought the witch in a battle using her own Tantric powers. After the queen defeated the witch, the nephew returned to the capital and was crowned king and the former queen was ordered to perform a yearly Tantric rituals for the new king's protection. The Jhijhiya tradition is said to have been the yearly ritual performed for the king's protection according to the folk beliefs of Mithila.

On the eighth day of Navaratri or Durga Ashtami, the rite of Kumari Bhojan takes place. Nine or more young girls are invited to the house by devotees and are honoured as manifestations of the mother goddess. The girls are fed a Sattvic meal, and then given money and gifts. Many people in Bihar, Jharkhand, and Purvanchal also fast on Ashtami due to the auspiciousness of the day.

The day of Dussehra in Bihar, Jharkhand, Purvanchal, and Madhesh is celebrated as a highly auspicious day by Hindus in these regions. In these regions, it is considered inauspicious to travel during Navaratri after the Kalash Sthapana until the morning puja on Dussehra. Thus in the greater Bihar region, Dussehra is also known as Jatra which means "journey." After households perform the morning puja, the barley grown is cut and bundled and tied into the hair of men and boys. These bundles of barley are called Jayanti. After tying Jayanti, the men and boys perform pranam and touch the feet of their elders for blessings.

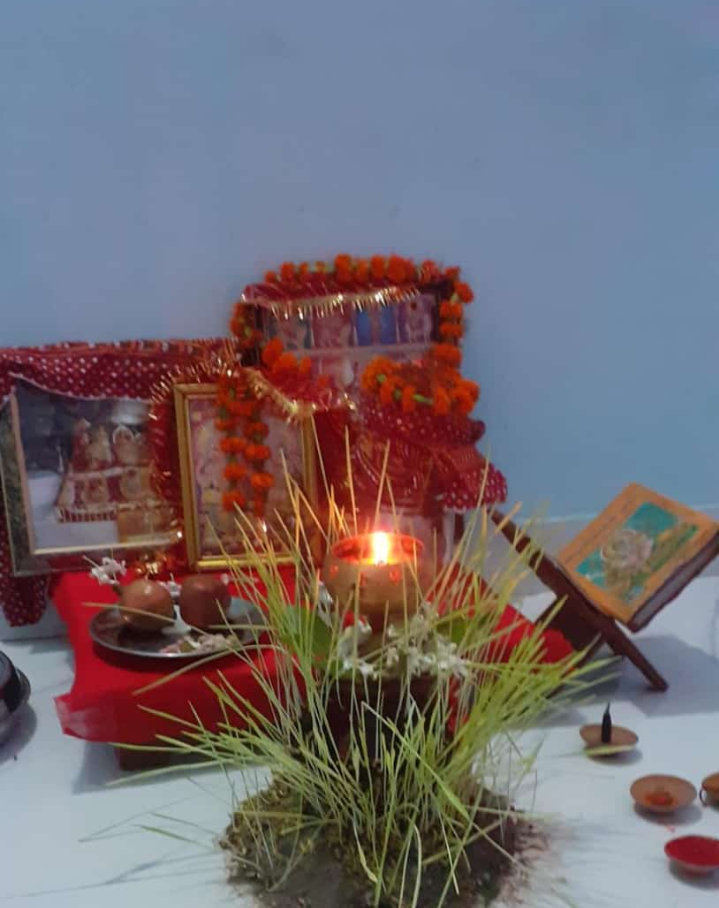
A kalash topped with a diya placed on a mound of soil from which barley is growing. A main tradition of Navaratri in Bihar, Jharkhand, and Purvanchal.

In the Bihari cultures, the festival of Navaratri is seen as the time when Durga returns to her maternal home and Dussehra as the day when she returns back to Kailash. In the greater Bihar region and especially Mithila, mothers gift a bundle of rice, sindoor, turmeric, Durva grass, betel nuts, and money to their daughters before they leave for their in-laws home. This bundle of gifts is wrapped in a saree cloth and handed to the daughters before they leave. This gift which is called a Khoinchh is also gifted to Durga on the day of Dussehra or Dashami by Bihari women as it is believed to be the day when Durga returns to her in-laws home. The kalash and remaining barley which was installed on the first day of Navaratri is immersed in a water body on Dashami. Localities, colonies, organizations, and families who hosted a Durga Puja may also immerse the idols of Durga, Lakshmi, Saraswati, Ganesha, and Kartikeya in water bodies also.

Bengali culture has had a profound influence on the greater Bihar region for many centuries, thus in many parts of Bihar, Jharkhand, and Purvanchal, the autumnal Navaratri is celebrated with Durga Puja. Numerous pandals for Durga Puja are set up and decorated in the cities of Patna, Gaya, Darbhanga, Bhagalpur, Muzaffarpur, Purnia, Jamshedpur, Ranchi, Dhanbad, Deoghar, Varanasi, and Gorakhpur. During Durga Puja, Durga is worshipped alongside Lakshmi, Saraswati, Kartikeya, and Ganesha. The Durga Puja traditions of Bilva Nimantran and Akal Bodhan on Shashthi, the Nabapatrika Puja and Pranapratishta Puja on Saptami, the Kumari Puja and Sandhi Puja on Ashtami, the Chandi Homa and Bhog on Navami, and the Durga Visarjan of Dashami are all performed in Bihar similarly but less commonly as Bengal, Assam, and Odisha.

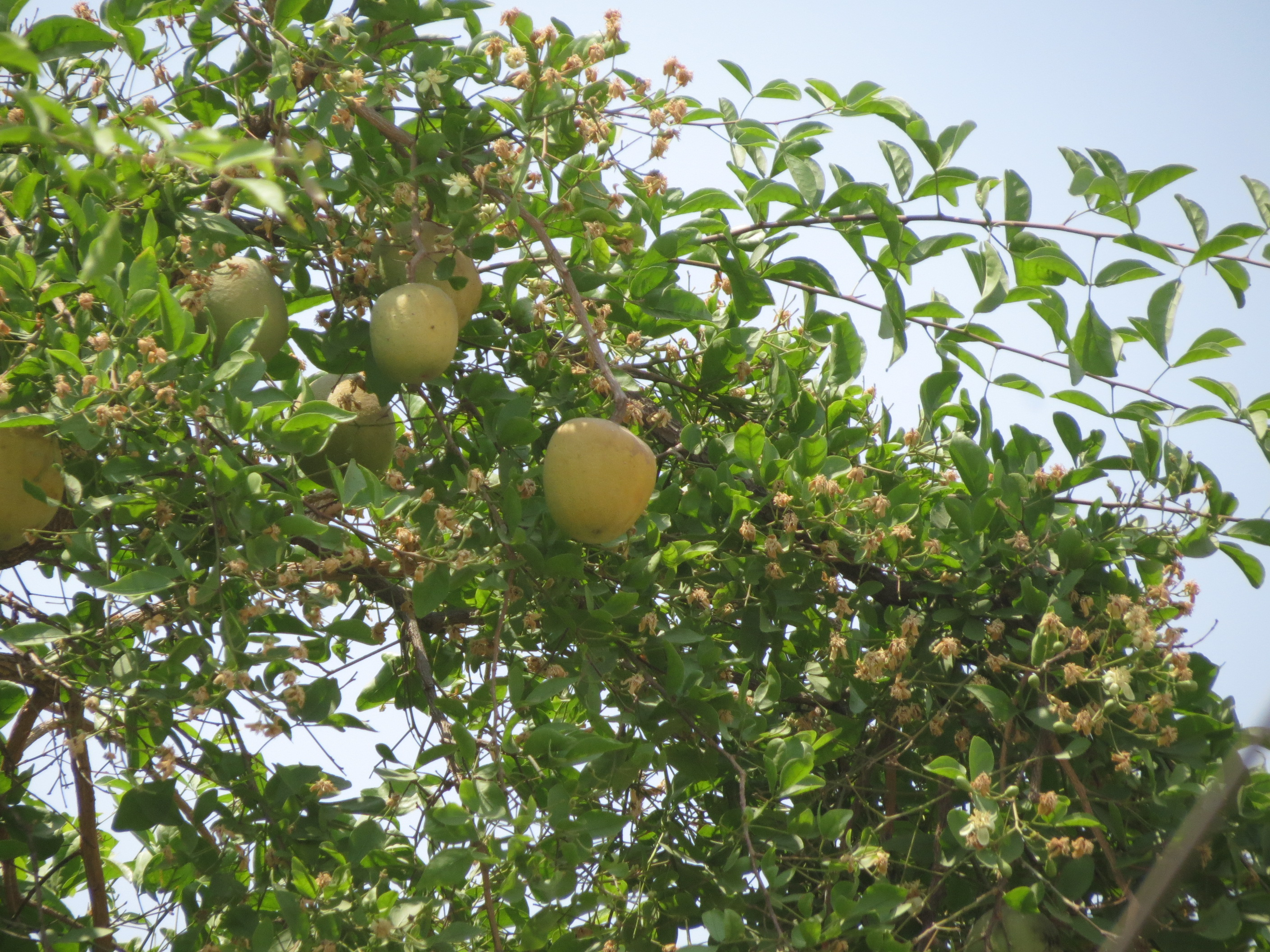
The fruits of the sacred Bel tree.

In the greater Bihari cultural region, Durga Puja begins on Saptami. The sixth and seventh days of Navaratri or Shashthi and Saptami are celebrated with the Belnati Beltodi ritual. In the evening of Shasthi, devotees gather at Indian bael trees to worship the trees. The trees are worshipped in a traditional puja conducted by priests and accompanied by the playing of drums, bells, and conches. The roots of the tree are washed with holy water and cow dung. Grains, flowers, fruits, and a yellow cloth are then offered to the tree. After climbing a ladder, the priest identifies a pair of twin fruits from the tree and binds them together with a red cloth for the night. This ritual is known as Belnati and symbolizes inviting the bel tree for Durga Puja. On the morning of Saptami, devotees gather at the trees again in processions of music and chants. A decorated palanquin is carried by the devotees to the tree of their chosen twin fruits. The twin fruits are plucked from the tree and placed in the decorated palanquin which is carried in a procession to the site where Durga Puja will be performed. This ritual is called Beltodi. According to local belief in Mithila, the goddess is present in the twin bel fruits and is accompanied by ghosts, demons, and spirits in the procession to the Durga Puja pandal or temple. Offerings of food are prepared and offered for the accompanying spirits and they are ritually worshipped before the palanquin reaches the Durga Puja site. When the twin bel fruits are brought to the pandal or temple, the fruits are ritually worshipped and the eyes of the Durga idol are finally opened. After this ritual of Belnati Beltodi, Durga Puja begins in Bihar.

In other parts like Sitamarhi and the Mithila region of Bihar and Nepal, the spring Navaratri attracts a large Rama Navami fair, which marks the birth of Lord Rama. It is the largest cattle trading fair and attracts a large handicraft market in pottery, kitchen, and housewares, as well as traditional clothing. Festive performance arts and celebrations are held at the local Hindu temple dedicated to Sita, Hanuman, Durga, and Ganesha.

=== Uttar Pradesh ===
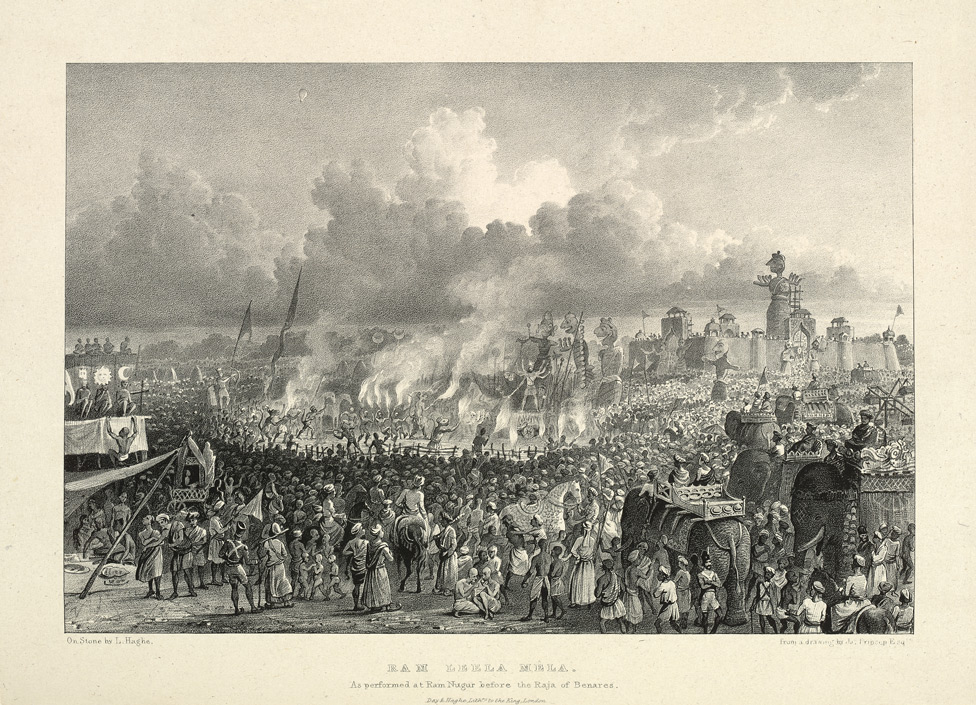
An 1834 sketch by James Prinsep showing Rama Leela Mela during Navaratri in Benares.

In the Braj, Doab, Kannauj, and Awadh regions of Uttar Pradesh, Navaratri is marked by the numerous Ramlila events, where episodes from the story of Rama and Ravana are enacted by teams of artists in rural and urban centers, inside temples, or in temporarily constructed stages. This Hindu tradition of festive performance arts was inscribed by UNESCO as one of the "Intangible Cultural Heritage of Humanity" in 2008. The festivities, states UNESCO, include songs, narration, recital and dialogue based on the Hindu text Ramcharitmanas by Tulsidas. Though Ramlila is most common and a significant component of the culture and identity in western Uttar Pradesh and Awadh, it is also performed in other regions also such as Purvanchal, Bihar, Madhya Pradesh, and Haryana. It is particularly notable in the historically important Hindu cities of Ayodhya, Varanasi, Vrindavan, Almora, Satna and Madhubani – cities in Uttar Pradesh, Uttarakhand, Bihar, and Madhya Pradesh.

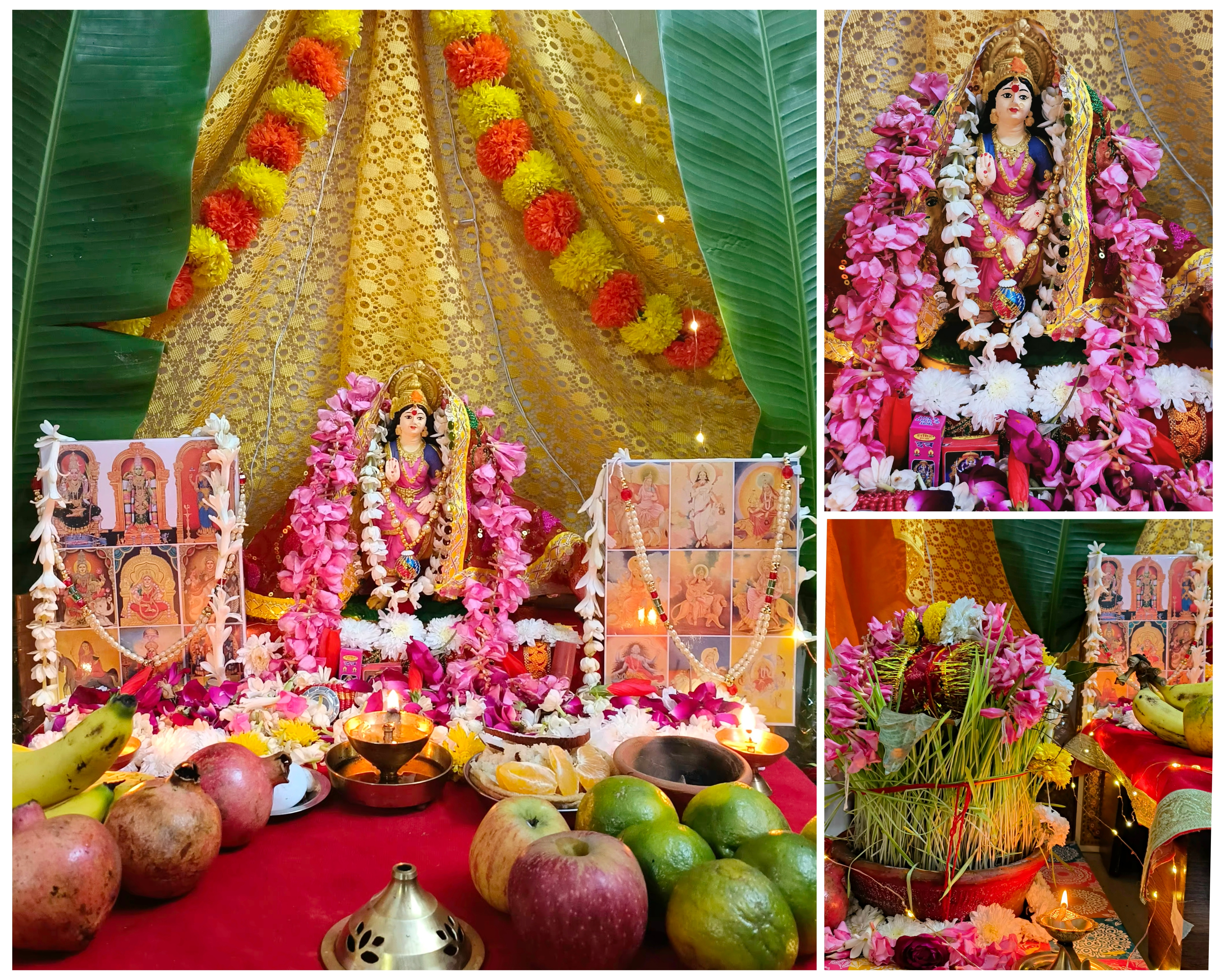
An altar prepared for Navratri, featuring an earthen pot and freshly sown barley at the lower right, a common tradition in North India.

The festival and dramatic enactment of the story is organized by communities in hundreds of small villages and towns, attracting a mix of audiences from different social, gender. and economic backgrounds. In many parts, the audience and villagers join in and participate spontaneously, some helping the artists, others helping with stage set up, create make-up, effigies, and lights.

Navaratri has historically been a prominent ritual festival for kings and military of a kingdom. At the end of the Navaratri, comes Dussehra, where the effigies of Ravana, Kumbhakarna, and Indrajit are burnt to celebrate the victory of good (Rama) over evil forces.

In western and central Uttar Pradesh, Navaratri is observed with household devotion and public celebrations. Devotees offer prayers at temples, participate in communal rituals, and observe fasting or other religious practices during the nine-day festival. Many households perform a hawan (fire ritual) daily or on selected days to invoke divine energies, purify the home, and reinforce the symbolic victory of good over evil. On the eighth or ninth day (Ashtami or Navami), the Kanya Puja is conducted, during which young girls representing the nine forms of Durga are worshipped and offered food and gifts, marking the culmination of the festival. The festival also features numerous melas (fairs) and julus (processions) in towns and villages, attracting devotees and adding a communal celebratory atmosphere. At the household level, the festival centers around Ghatasthapana, in which a clay or metal pot (ghata) filled with water and topped with a coconut and mango leaves or barley is placed on a small platform covered with soil in which barley seeds are sown. An oil lamp (akhand jyot) is lit beside the pot and maintained continuously for nine days, symbolizing the presence of Goddess Durga and the triumph of divine light over darkness. The pot is regarded as a representation of the universe, while the flame signifies Durga's eternal energy (Shakti).

=== Punjab and Haryana ===
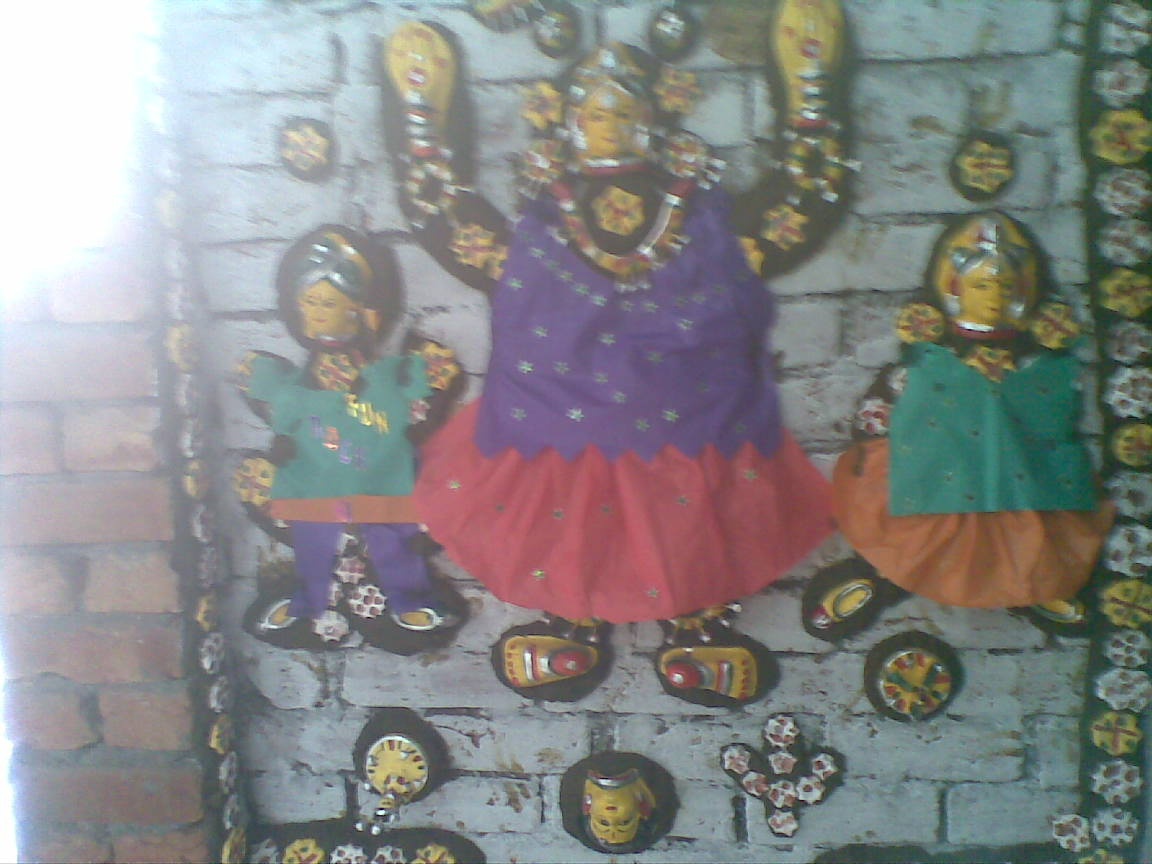
An earthen image of Sanjhi Mata plastered to a wall.

In Punjab, Haryana, and also Jammu, Navaratri is known as Naurate and celebrated with the worship of Sanjhi Mata. On the first day of Navaratri, barley is sowed in two clay pots. Using mud, clay, or cow dung, Punjabi and Haryanvi women make an earthen image of Goddess Parvati along with stars, the sun, the moon, banyan trees, and other religious figures. The earthen image of Goddess Parvati is called Sanjhi Mata and it is plastered to a wall of the courtyard usually. Sanjhi Mata represents the form of Goddess Parvati leaving Kailash to spend nine days at her maternal home. From the first day of Navaratri to the ninth, women and girls gather at the earthen images and sing traditional songs dedicated to Sanjhi Mata and dance in the evenings. In Punjab, women sing traditional couplets or boliyan and perform the giddha dance. The earthen image of Sanjhi Mata is worshipped for nine days and then on Dussehra, it is taken down and placed in a large vessel with a diya. Sisters bundle the barley shoots and place them over the ears of their brothers. The remaining barley is placed in the vessel and the vessel is taken to a local water body to be immersed.

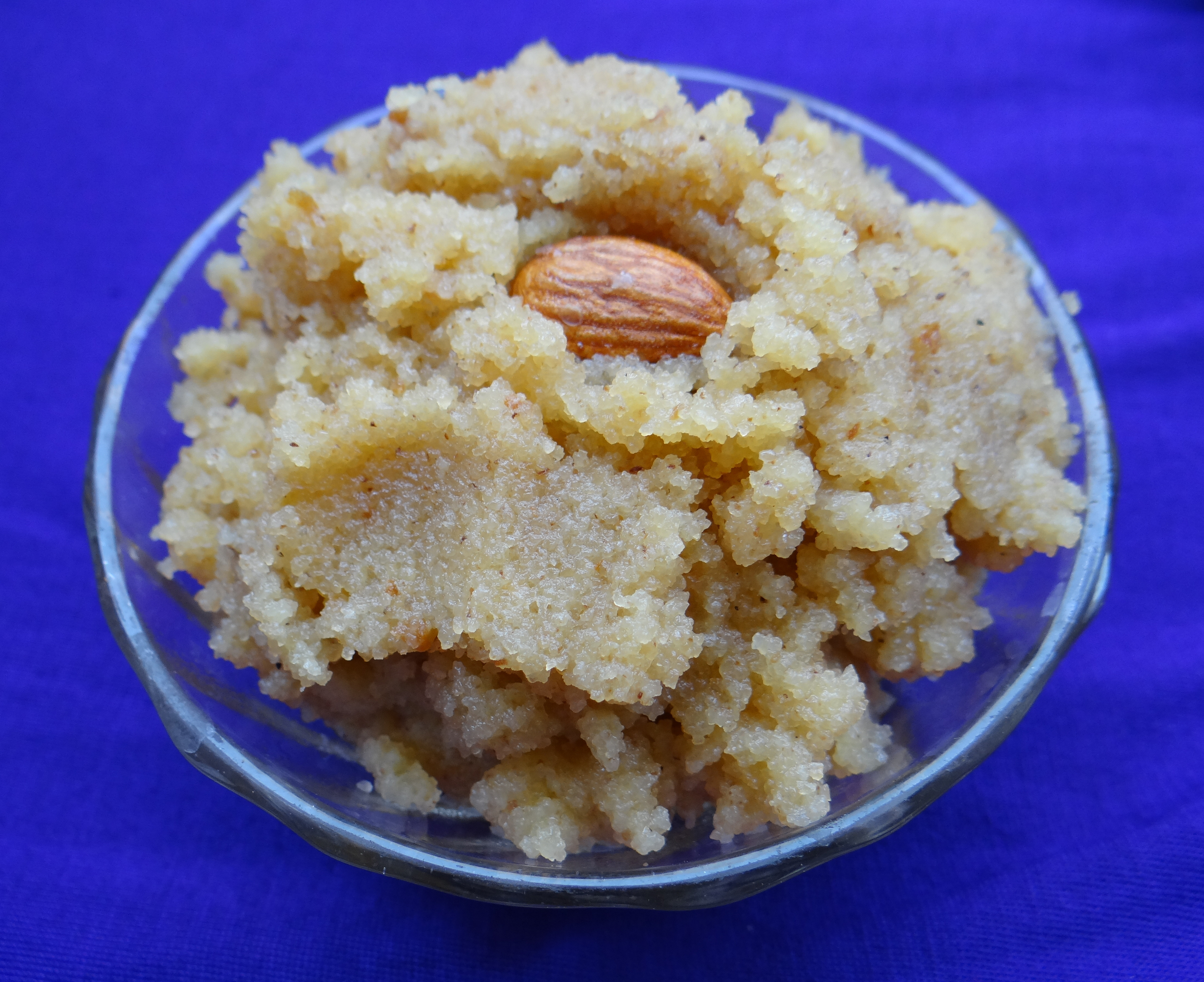
Sooji halwa is a type of halwa prepared by toasting semolina in ghee and adding sugar. It is eaten as prasad by Punjabi Hindus on the day of Durga Ashtami.

In Punjab, the eighth day of Navaratri or Ashtami is celebrated with the kanjakan rite, known as Kanya Puja elsewhere. Kanjak refers to a young girl who is invited to a devotee's home and fed a prasad of puri, kala chana, and sooji halwa or karah parshad. Usually, nine girls are invited, representing the nine forms of Durga. The hosts tie a sacred red thread around the wrists of the girls and gift them red bangles, a red bindi, and a red veil with gold sequin which is called a mata di chunni. The hosts usually keep a fast on this day and break their fast after the invited girls are fed and given gifts.

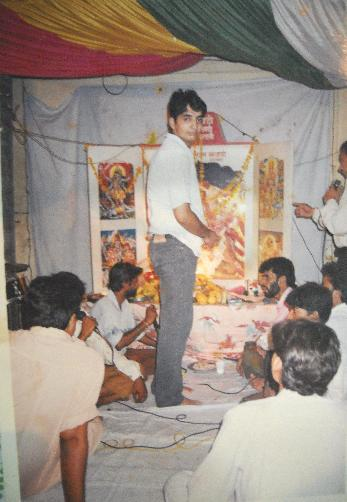
Punjabi men at a Jagrata in Muktsar, Punjab.

A popular tradition amongst Punjabi Hindus during Navaratri is the observance of a jagrata, a devotional nightly vigil dedicated to Durga who is commonly known as Sheranwali Mata in Punjab and often depicted as accompanied by Bajrang Bali and Bhairo Baba. Jagratas consist of the singing of traditional Punjabi devotional songs such as bhajans and bhents along with dancing. The jagrata begins with the host tying a long sacred red thread to a spoon or stick. With the spoon in one hand, the host lights the suspended end of the red thread and then hovers the spoon above an akhand jyot or lamp so that the burning red thread lights up the wick of the akhand jyot. Kathas or devotional stories are often told during the jagrata. The two popular kathas told during jagratas are "Bhole da Vyah," the legend of Shiva and Parvati's marriage and "Tara Rani di Katha," a Punjabi folk story about two devout women: Tara, a queen, and Rukman, an outcaste who performed a jagrata for the goddess. Jagratas traditionally conclude at sunrise with the Punjabi aarati "Bhor Bhai Din Chad Geya Meri Ambe" ("Morning has come, the day has dawned, O my Mother Ambe").

Due to the significant presence of Punjabi Hindus in Delhi and Mumbai, the traditions of kanjakan and jagrata have been adopted by people belonging to other North Indian cultures, much like how Karwa Chauth has widely spread beyond Punjab.

=== Kashmir ===
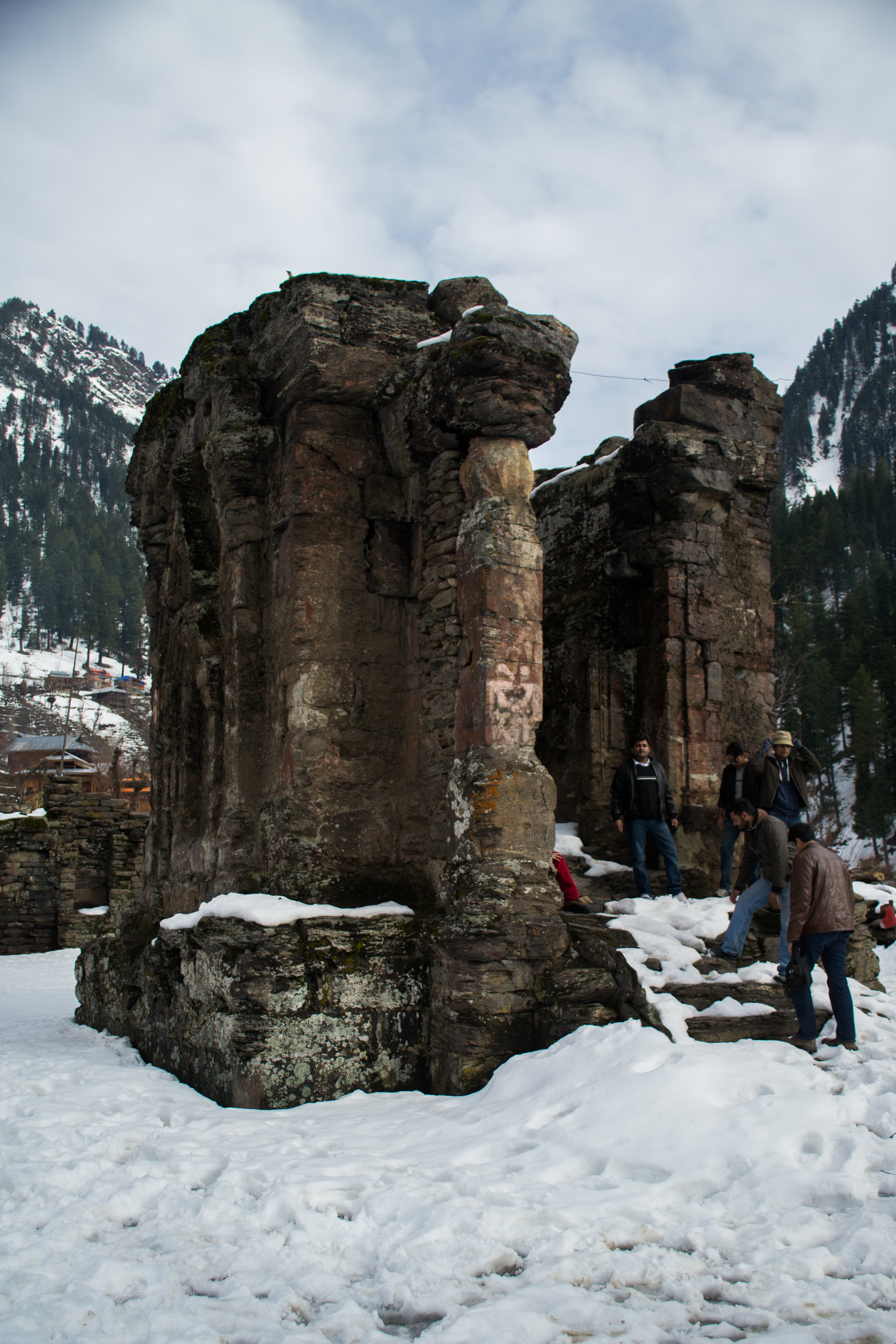
The ruins of Sharada Peeth, an ancient center of goddess worship in Kashmir and an important Shakti Pitha dedicated to Saraswati. Historically, Navaratri was an important time for Kashmiri Hindus to make pilgrimage to this temple. The last pilgrimage to Sharada Peeth took place in 1947, just before the partition of India, after which access to the temple was ceased.

Amongst Kashmiri Hindu households in both the diaspora and the few remaining in Kashmir, the autumnal Navaratri is commenced with the sowing of barley seeds in a clay pot in a rite known as Krech Puja. For nine days, Kashmiri Hindus water the barley, fast, and recite the Bhavani Sahasranama, a stotra dedicated to Shakti that was composed in Kashmir. The fourth day of Navaratri initially was observed as a day dedicated to married women along with the worship of Indra's horse, Uchchaihshravas. The sixth day of Navaratri is observed as Kumar Sheyam or Kumar Shishti by Kashmiri Hindus in which devotees fast for the entire day until they visit a temple or worship Kartikeya at home during the evening. In the evening, devotees light six lamps dedicated to Kartikeya.

The eighth day of Ashtami is known as Durga Atham which is observed with fasting and the worship of Bhadrakali. Kashmiri Hindus celebrate the eighth day with a devotional nightly vigil called a jagarna that involves singing and dancing. A large fair is held at the Kheer Bhawani Temple on the eighth day and at Hari Parbat on the ninth day. On the ninth day, Durga is worshipped along with shopkeepers and merchants worshipping their books and artisans worshipping their tools. The tenth day is known as Dusheera and the pots of barley are immersed in rivers on this day. Khichdi is commonly offered as prasad and eaten during this time by Kashmiri Hindus.

=== Gujarat ===
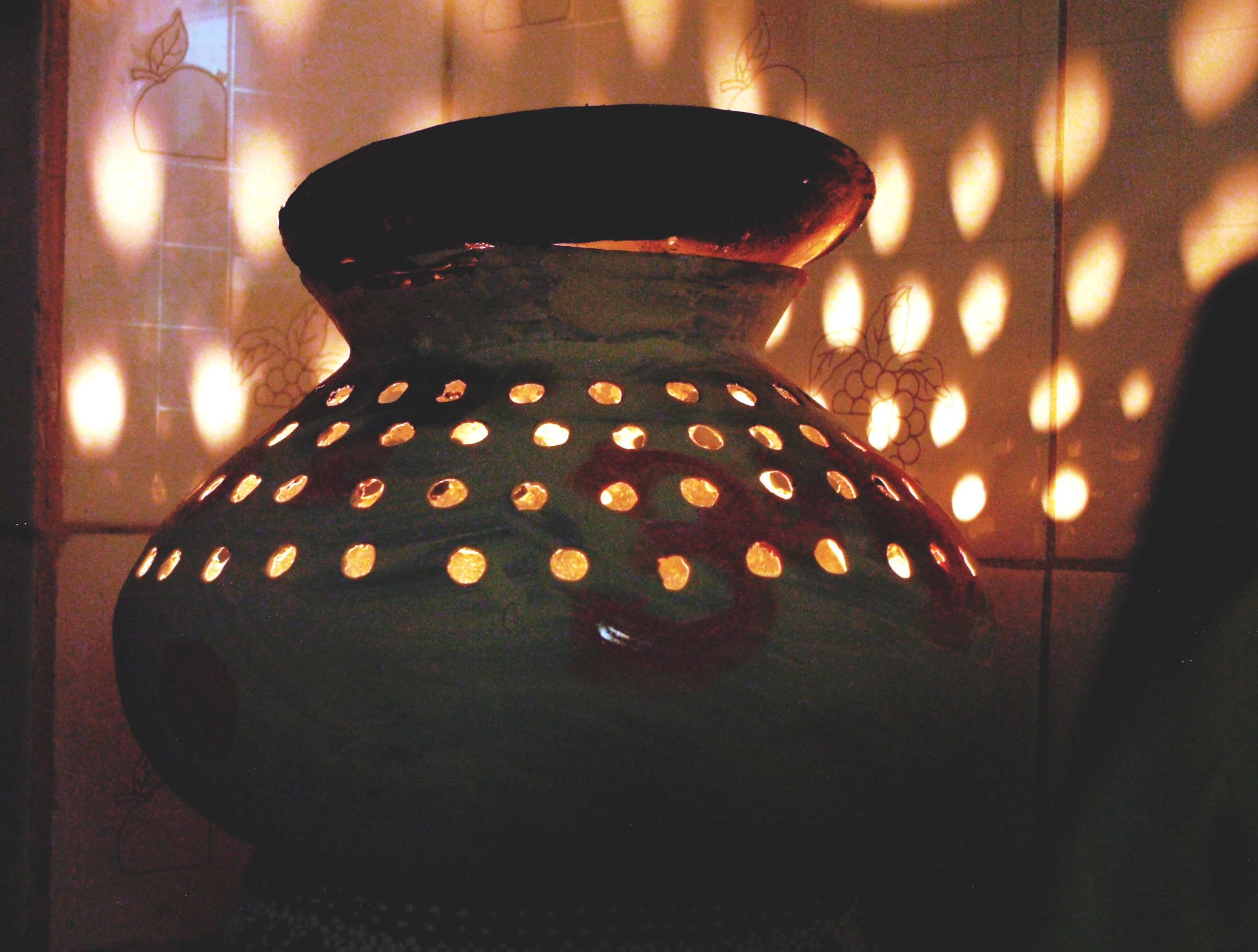
The Gujarati garbo pot which the circular garba dance is performed around during Navaratri.

Navaratri in Gujarat is one of the state's main festivals. The traditional celebrations include fasting for a day, or partially fasting each of the nine days by not eating grains or just taking liquid foods, in remembrance of one of nine aspects of Shakti goddess. The prayers are dedicated to a symbolic clay pot called garbo, as a remembrance of the womb of the family and universe. Traditional Garba pots often contain 27 holes arranged in three rows of nine, symbolizing the 27 Nakshatras, with the total of 108 associated with the four Charans of each Nakshatra. The garba holes importance: 27 holes in the garba. The pot is used as a lantern during the late nights of garba dancing. When the lamp inside the garbo pot is lit, the light escapes through the many holes and scatters like beams, this is believed to represent the many souls coming from the one Atman (soul, self).

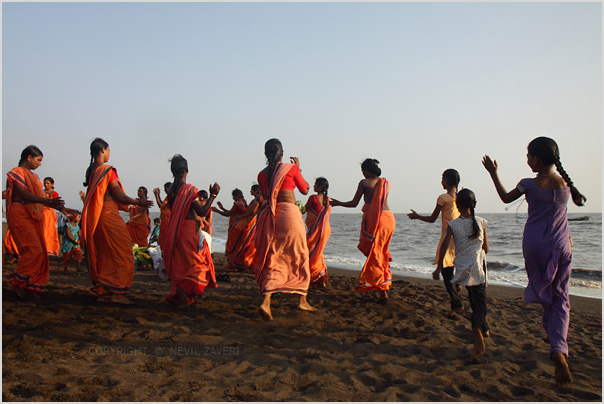
Garba dancing is a Navaratri tradition in Gujarat.

In Gujarat and nearby Hindu communities such as in Malwa, the garbo significance is celebrated through performance arts on all nine days. The most visible is group dances called Garba accompanied by live orchestra, seasonal raga, or devotional songs. It is a folk dance where people of different background and skills join and form concentric circles. The circles can grow or shrink, reaching sizes of hundreds or thousands of people, dancing and clapping in circular moves in their traditional attire. The garba dance sometimes deploys dandiyas (sticks), coordinated movements and the striking of sticks between the dancers, and teasing between the genders. Post dancing, the group and the audience socializes and feasts together. Regionally, the same thematic celebration of community songs, music, and dances on Navaratri is called garba.

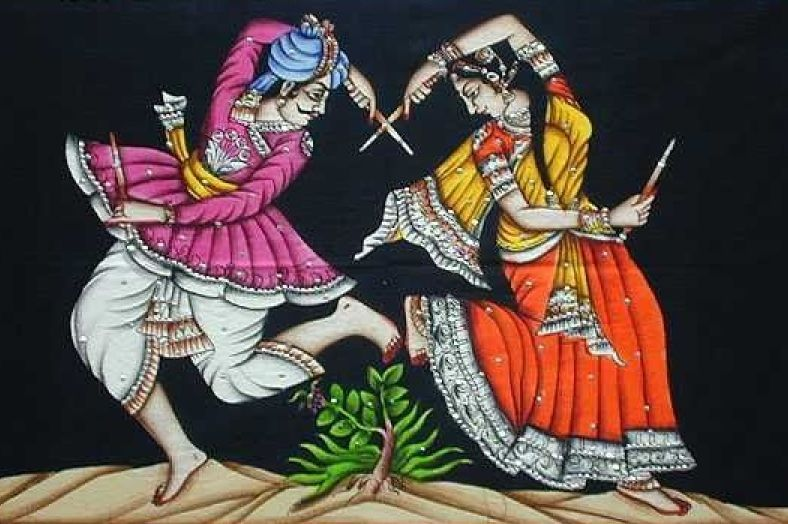
A cotton tapestry depicting a Gujarati couple performing dandiya raas.

Dandiya raas is one of the most popular dances performed by Gujaratis during Navaratri. The dance consists of two lines with partners facing each other while holding a pair of decorated sticks called dandiyas. The partners move forward and strike their dandiyas together which is usually done in a coordinated rhythmic sequence which is usually an eight-beat pattern called a keherwa. The dance involves stepping, striking, and twirling which must be done in coordination with the rhythm. The dance becomes more intense and fast as the beat becomes more intense and fast. When the eight-beat keherwa ends, partners move on to the next partner and continue moving down the lines.

Gujarati garba songs have a deeply devotional and cultural character rooted in the folk culture and Hindu traditions of Gujarat. The central theme of many garba songs is the worship of Shakti and her many forms such as Durga, Chamunda, Kali, and Parvati. Gujarati songs commonly refer to Durga as "Amba" or "Jagdamba." The lyrics often praise the goddess as a mother and many retell episodes from Hindu Puranas such as the battle between Durga and Mahishasura. A common theme of many garba songs is Radha and Krishna. The songs may emphasize Radha's longing for Krishna or jealousy, contain retellings of Krishna dancing and performing raas with Radha and the Gopis, and depict Krishna as the bringer of bliss with his flute. Garba songs commonly refer to the topography and environment of Gujarat, referencing specific places such as temples or towns, rivers, villages, and regional traditions. Garba is a highly social festival, thus garba songs are usually uplifting and energetic. The sanedo form of garba songs include social and playful commentary. In the Gujarati and Indian diaspora and urban settings in India, garba music may be mixed with Bollywood music.

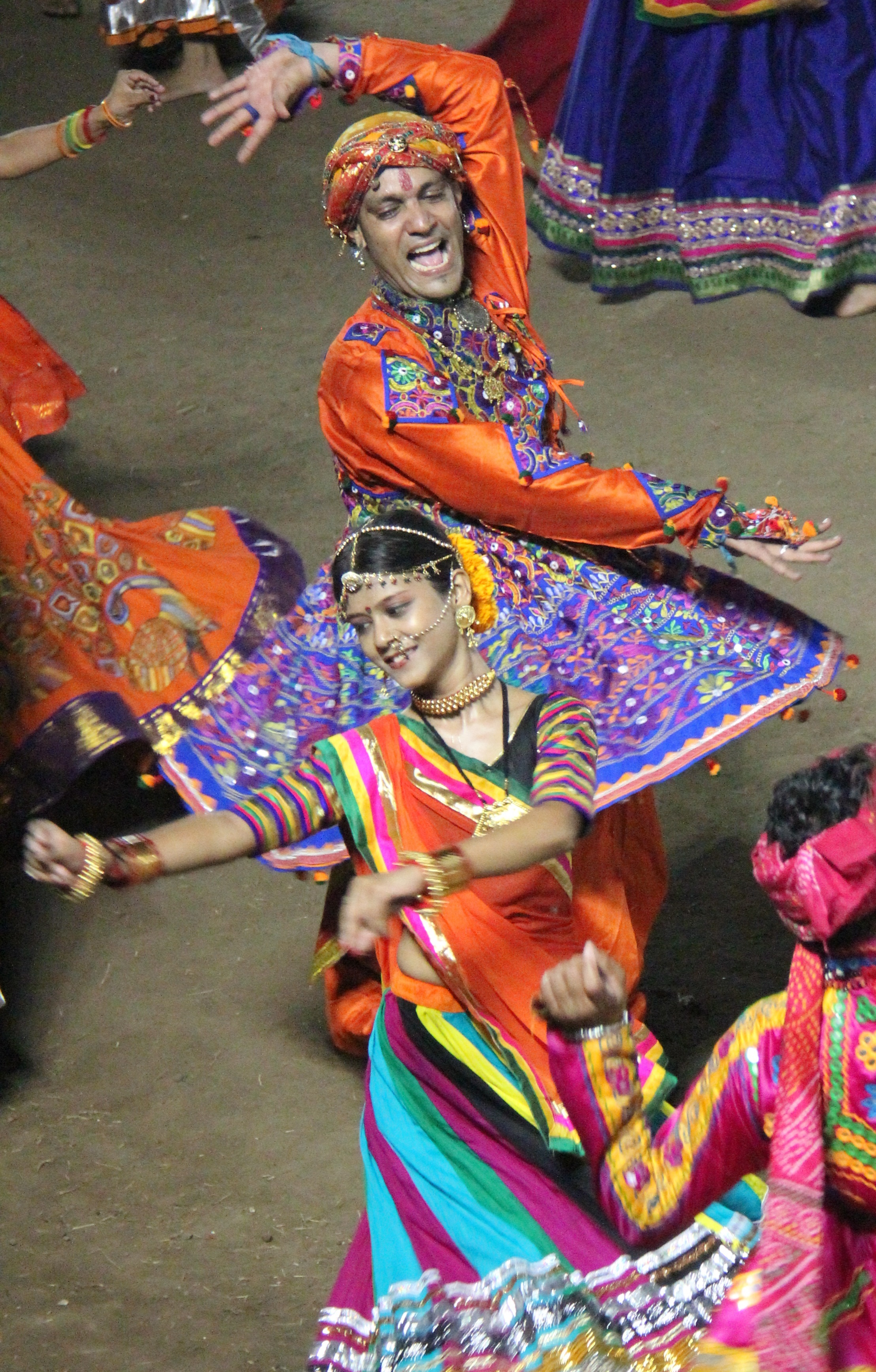
A Gujarati man wearing a kediyu and a Gujarati woman wearing a chaniya choli dancing at a garba.

Gujaratis dress in vibrant clothes during Navaratri. Traditionally during garba, Gujaratis men wore a kediyu, a garment that was pleated at the chest and reached to the waist. The kediyu was worn with a chorno, a wide and loose version of pantaloons. The men would also wear a traditional Gujarati turban called a phento. In the modern day, men mostly wear a churidar and kurta. Women traditionally wear a chaniya choli during garba. It consists of a long flared skirt called a chaniya and a short fitted blouse which is the choli. The outfit is always paired with a matching veil or scarf called the odhni or chunari. The outfit is often heavily decorated with mirrorwork and intricate Gujarati embroidery. Women usually wear traditional jewellery such as jhumkas during garba also.

The worship of folk goddesses is very prevalent during Navaratri in Gujarat. Fairs and garba dances are held at the shrines and temples of the folk goddesses. These folk goddesses who are honoured during Navaratri include Meladi, Khodiyar, Bahuchara, Momai, Vahanvati, Shitala,Vihat, Randal, Jogani, Umiya, Mogal, Modheswari, Brahmani, Sadhi, and Hadkai. Many Gujarati Hindus make pilgrimage to the temples of their kuladevi during Navaratri. The kuladevi is regarded as the protector of the clan and family and is usually a tutelary of folk goddess representing a form of Shakti.

Due to the significant presence of Gujaratis in Mumbai and in the Western World, and the representation of garba in Indian television and Bollywood, the tradition of garba has expanded beyond Gujarat. In large Indian cities outside of Gujarat such as Mumbai, Delhi, Hyderabad, Bengaluru, Kolkata, Lucknow, Chennai, Chandigarh, and Jaipur, numerous organizations, educational institutions, temples, and community groups organize large and festive garba and dandiya events. Garba has gained prevalence amongst non-Gujarati Hindus in the West such as Indian Americans of Telugu, Tamil, Malayali, and Marathi descent, along with Indo Canadians and British Indians of Punjabi and Haryanvi descent. The performance of garba and dandiya during Navaratri has transcended from being just a Gujarati folk tradition to becoming a pan-Indian and national cultural phenomenon.

=== Maharashtra ===
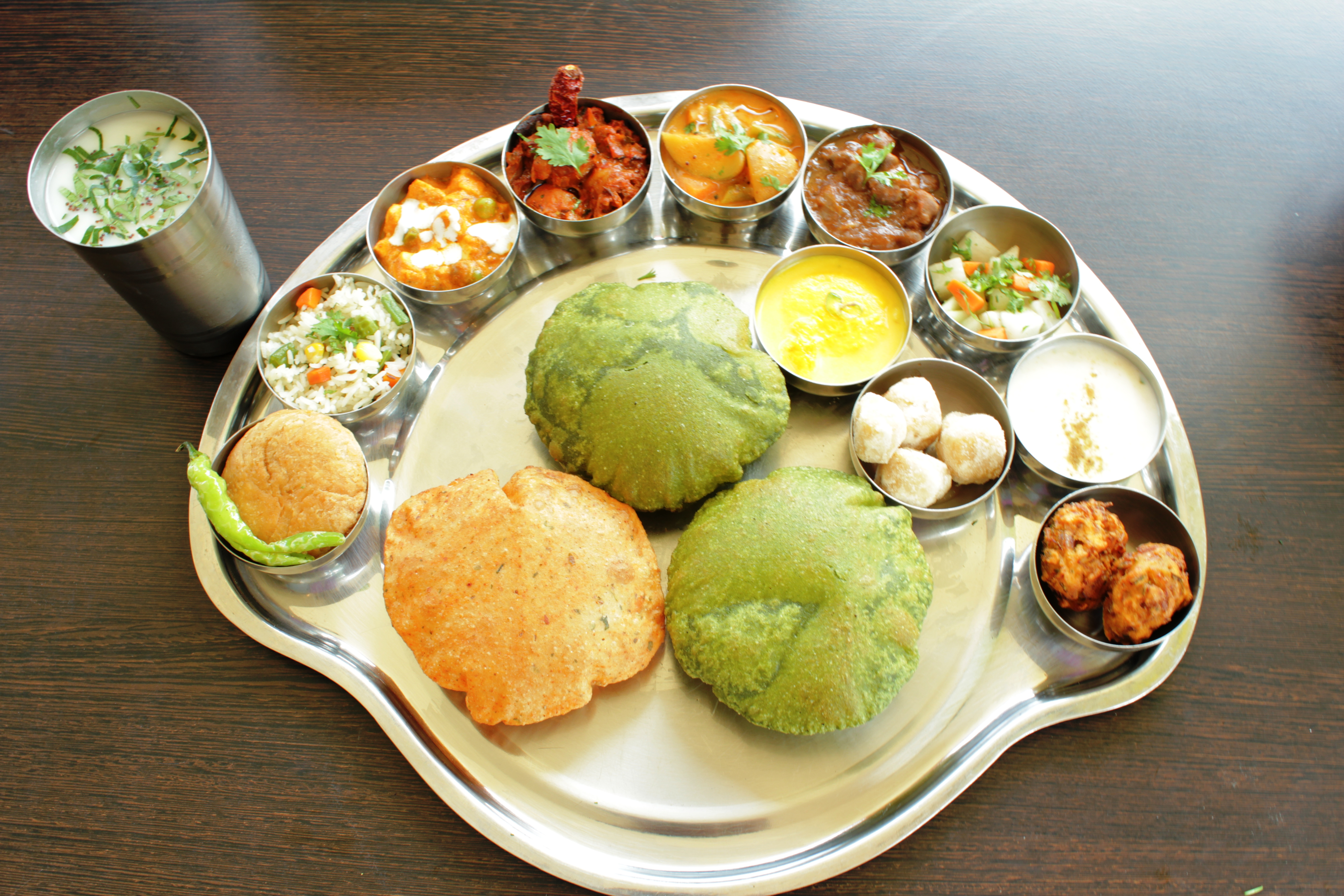
Navaratri is also a festival for feasting with friends and family.

Navaratri celebrations vary across Maharashtra and the specific rites differ between regions, even if they are called the same and dedicated to the same deity. The most common celebration begins on the first day of Navaratri with Ghatasthapana, which literally means "mounting of a jar". On this day, rural households mount a copper or brass jar, filled with water, upon a small heap of rice kept on a wooden stool (pat). The jar is typically placed other agriculture symbols such as a turmeric root, leaves of a mango tree, coconut, and major staple grains (usually eight varieties). A lamp is lighted symbolising knowledge and household prosperity, and kept alight through the nine nights of Navaratri.

The family worships the pot for nine days by offering rituals and a garland of flowers, leaves, fruits, dry fruits, etc. with a naivedya, and water is offered in order to get the seeds sprouted. Some families also celebrate Kali Puja on days 1 and 2, Lakshmi Puja on days 3, 4, 5 and Saraswati Puja on days 6, 7, 8, 9 along with Ghatasthapana. On the eighth day, a "Yajna" or "Hom" is performed in the name of Goddess Durga. On the ninth day, the Ghat puja is performed and the Ghat is dismantled after taking off the sprouted leaves of the grains.

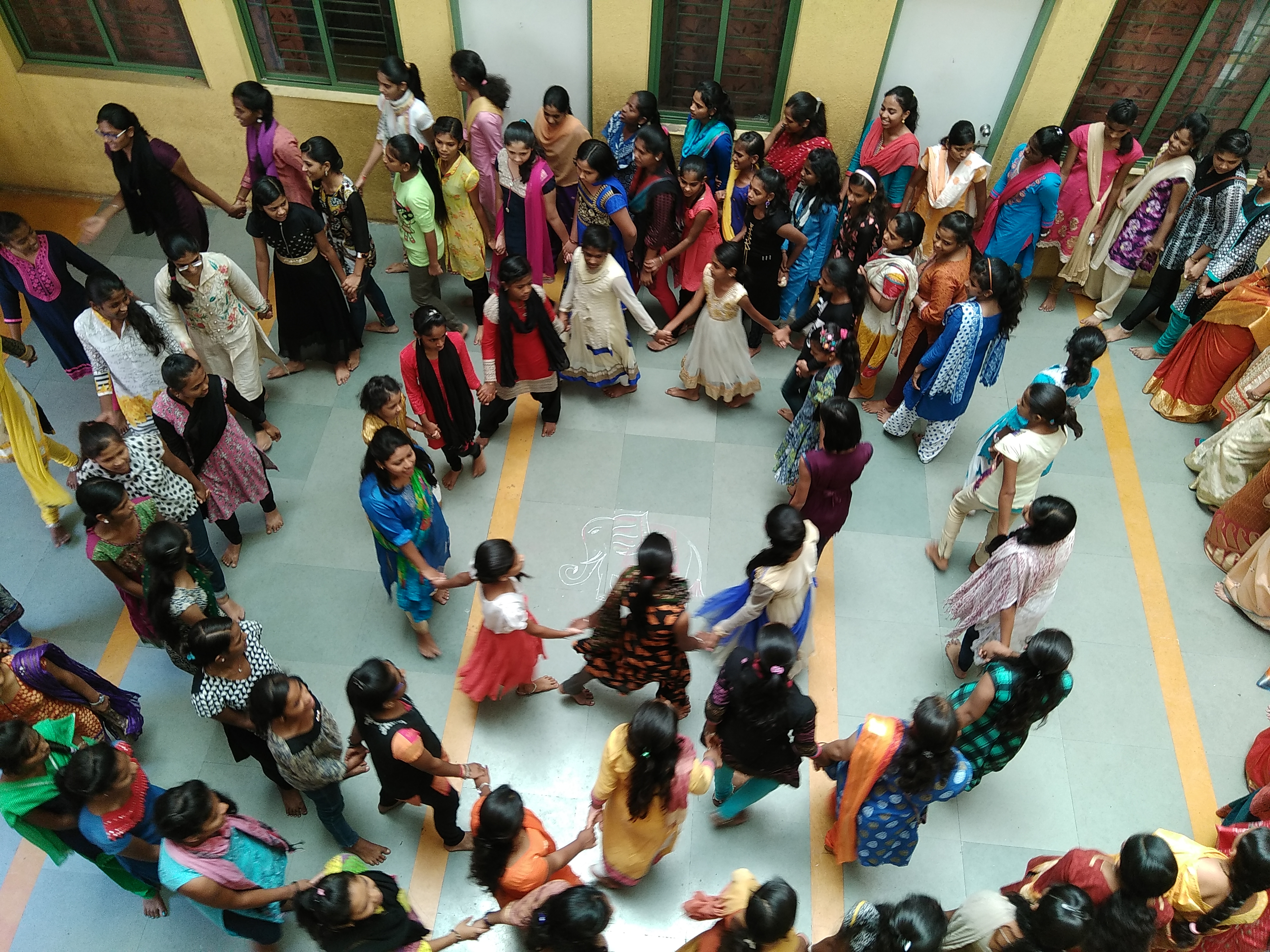
Marathi women and girls participating in Bhondla, a tradition consisting of holding hands together and circumambulating around an image of an elephant.

During Navaratri, the tradition of Bhondla is practiced by Marathi Hindu women and girls. The term "Bhondla" originates from the Marathi terms for "to ask" or "to chant," which symbolizes how the songs of Bhondla are sung. Bhondla is also known as hadga. Bhondla is a traditional Marathi folk practice in which an image of an elephant is drawn on a wooden slate and decorated with flowers and then danced around by women and girls. The elephant image is usually made from chalk or rangoli powders, but it can also be made with lentils or grains. In some regions of Maharashtra, a statue of an elephant is used or two elephant statues are hung on walls facing each other with a garland held up by their trunks. Traditional Marathi songs are sung during the Bhondla tradition and these songs often have mischievous or festive themes. The songs range from topics such as everyday activities to family and in-laws and to agriculture and devotion. The songs are passed down matrilineally generation by generation. The first song sung is generally a devotional hymn dedicated to Ganesha. Many Bhondla songs sung by married women express discontent with family, in-laws, and husbands and use terms such as "dwad" meaning "discontent" in Marathi. The dance consists of women and girls holding hands together while circumambulating around the elephant image. Following the rhythm of the songs, the participating women and girls will synchronize the dance with the beat through clapping and moving back and forth. At the end of Bhondla, a snack or sweet offered as prasad is consumed by the participants which is called khirapat. Usually, a guessing game is played at the end of Bhondla for the participants to guess what dish the khirapat is. Participating women usually wear a sari while younger girls wear a parkar polka, a long skirt and long blouse similar to the pattu pavadai of Tamils and the langa voni of Telugus.

In the Vidarbha region of Maharashtra, the tradition of Bhulabai is performed by married women. In this tradition, idols of Shiva and Parvati are danced around instead of an elephant image. According to the folk story associated with this tradition, Shiva once left Kailash after becoming upset when he lost to a game of dice to Parvati. As Shiva roamed the forest, Parvati took the form of a tribal woman and tried to appease Shiva through dance. The participants of this tradition call Parvati as 'Bhulabai' and Shiva as 'Bhuloba' or 'Bhulaji'. Usually clay idols of Bhulabai and Bhuloba were made by women and dressed in a traditional Marathi sari and turban, but nowadays readymade idols can be bought from local shops. A canopy of barley is constructed around the pedestal which the idols are placed upon. Traditional folk songs similar to the Bhondla songs are sung during the Bhulabai tradition. The tradition of khirapat is also the same. Sweetened milk is often prepared and consumed by the participating women. The idols of Bhulabai and Bhuloba are immersed the day after the gathering.

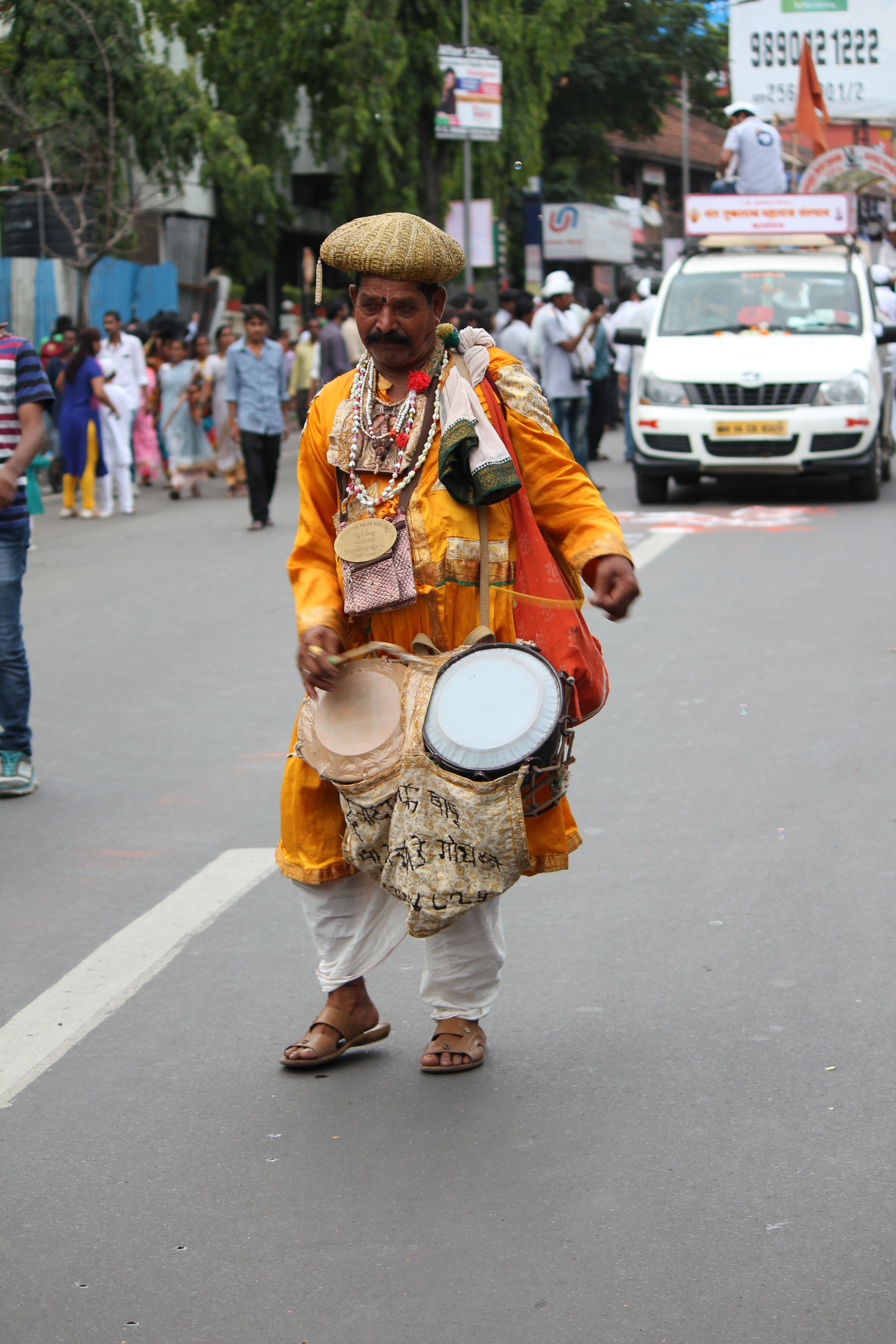
A Gondhali man playing a sambal drum.

The Marathi tradition of Gondhal is very common during Navaratri. Gondhalis are a community of musicians originating from Maharashtra and their historical occupation was to sing songs called Gondhal in devotion to goddesses and preaching. The Gondhal use folk drums called sambal which they tie to their necks and let rest on their thighs. Four men are needed to perform the Gondhal; one dancer wearing a long cowrie shell necklace with chimes on his ankles, two sambal drummers, and one who holds a torch called the dioti. The origin story of Gondhal comes from a text called the Renuka Mahatmya. The story links the tradition to Parashurama killing a demon and binding the sinews from the demon's head through the openings in the demon's crown to create a new instrument. The songs sung by the Gondhalis usually honour local Marathi goddesses such as Renuka, Tulja Bhavani, Saptashrungi, and Ambabai. During Navaratri, the Gondhalis are invited by devotees to their houses to perform the Gondhal and sing songs that honour Durga's triumph over Mahishasura.

The Goddess Lalita is worshiped on the fifth day of the festival. On the ninth day of the festival, men participate in worshiping all kinds of tools, weapons, vehicles, and productive instruments.

=== Goa and the Konkan ===
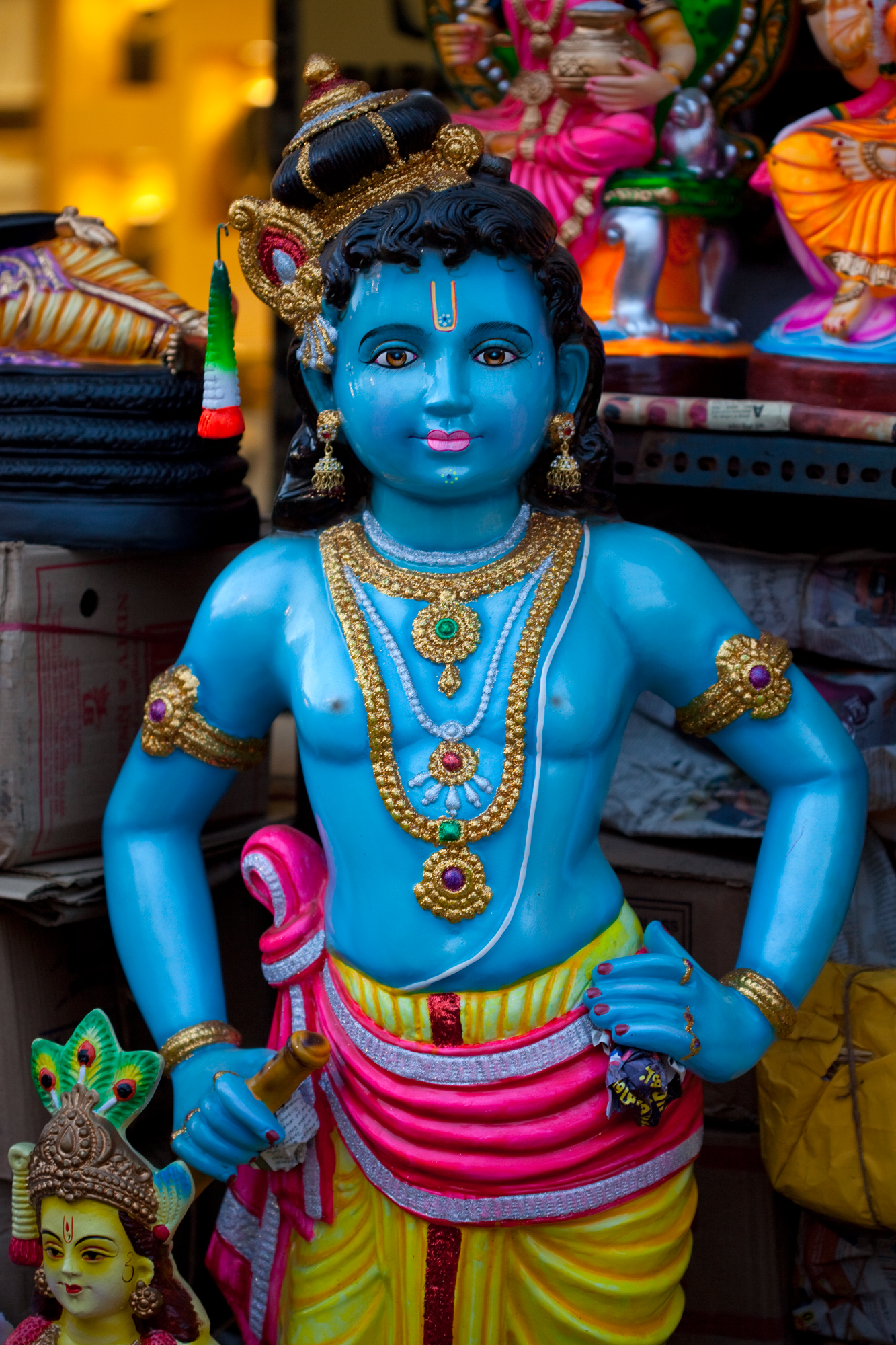
Some regions produce and sell special Navaratri miniature golu dolls, such as of Krishna above.

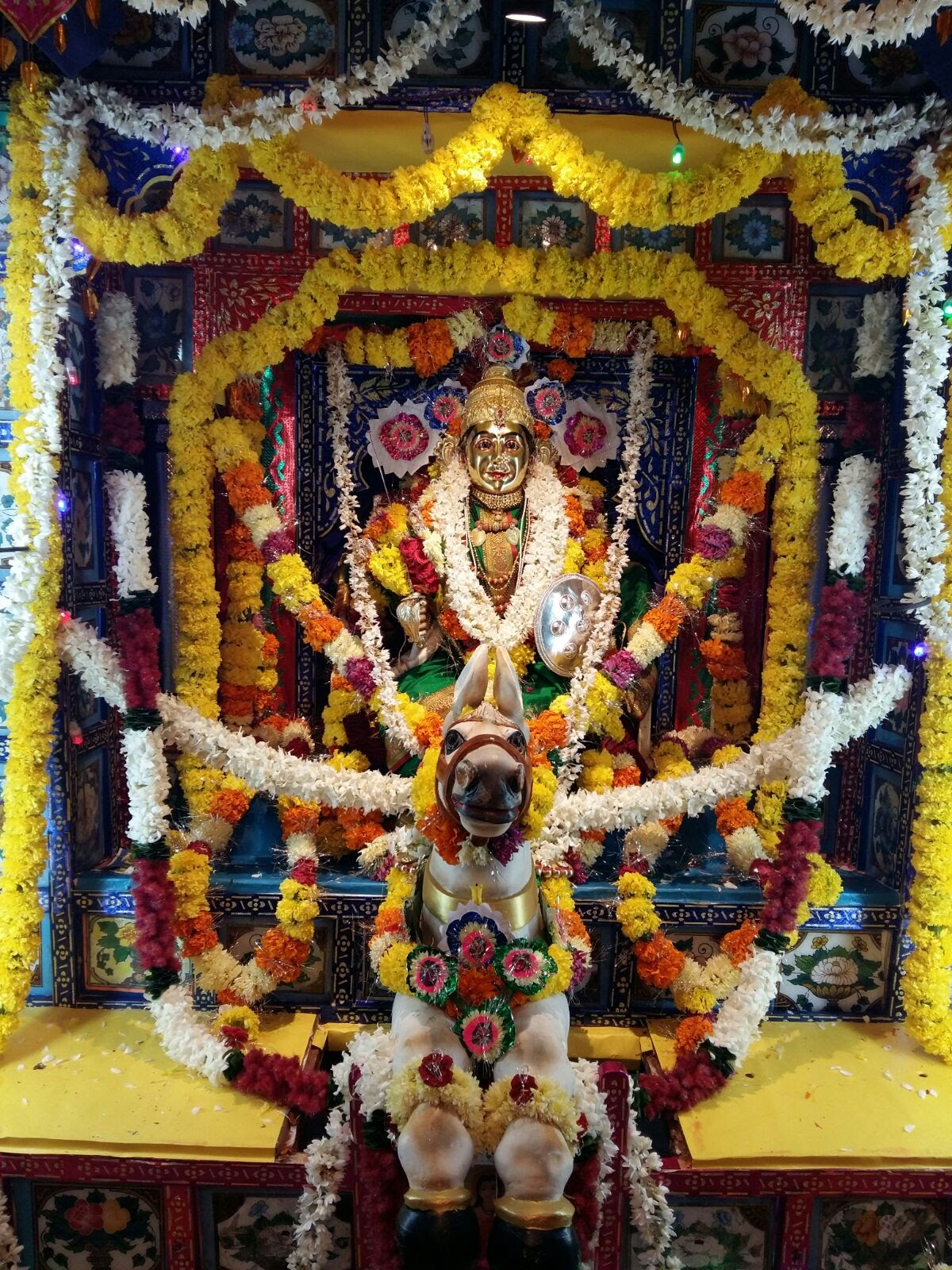
Makharotsav at the Shri Navadurga Devasthan in Cundaim, Goa.

Amongst the Konkani Hindus of Goa and the Konkan, the festival of autumnal Navaratri begins with the day of Padvo. On the day of Padvo, the Sri Bhaan or Tandla Madki is emptied of the previous year's rice and washed and cleaned. Then, the Tandla Madki is redecorated with mango leaves, sandalwood paste, and kumkum. At an auspicious time, the Tandla Madki is refilled with new raw rice which is kept until the next year's Navaratri. The Tandla Madki is topped with a lid, a coconut, and a betel nut with leaves. Paddy is hung on the doors of Konkani households on Padvo to welcome prosperity and the recent harvest. The Konkani dish of udida ghari, black gram dumplings is prepared and offered as prasad on Ashtami. A Konkani dish called chonya upkari which is a black chickpeas vegetable stir fry or dry curry is prepared and offered as prasad on Navami.

During Navaratri, Konkani Hindus perform Kanya Puja and Suvasini Puja. During the Kanya Puja ritual, young girls are invited by families to their home to be worshipped as representations of the goddess Durga. The eldest married woman of the family conducts this ritual. The girls are anointed with kumkum and sandalwood paste and given gifts such as bangles, clothes, and dakshina. The girls are fed a sacred meal without rice along with sweets. Suvasini Puja is a similar tradition but dedicated to married women. Married women known as sumangalis or suvasinis are invited to homes and worshipped as representations of the goddess Durga. The women are offered meals with rice and given a coconut, plantains, betel leaves, an areca nut, flowers, and dakshina. The eldest married woman of the family gifts the suvasinis a new sari.

The day of Navami is celebrated with families placing their daily implements such as work tools, cooking utensils, musical instruments, school books, ledgers, and academic materials at the altar to not be used until after Ayudha Puja on Vijaya Dashami. On the day of Vijaya Dashami, Ayudha Puja dedicated to the implements is performed and the implements are blessed for resumption of use. Young Konkani children are also initiated into learning on this day in a rite known as Aksharabhyas in which they write their first word using their finger in a plate of rice. The new rice from the harvest brought home during Navaratri is used to prepare a special meal on Vijaya Dashami called Nave Jevan. Branches and leaves of the Shami tree are also exchanged on this day.

In the temples of Goa, on the first day of the Hindu month of Ashwin, a copper pitcher, surrounded by clay, is installed inside the sanctum sanctorum of Devi and Krishna temples, in which nine varieties of food grains are placed. The nine nights are celebrated through devotional songs and religious discourses. Artists arrive to perform folk musical instruments. Celebrations include placing Durga's image in a specially-decorated colourful silver swing, known as Makhar, and for each of the nine nights, swinging the idols to the tune of temple music (called as ranavadya). This is locally called Makharotsav. The last night of the Goa Navaratri festival is a major celebration called the makhar arti.

=== Karnataka ===
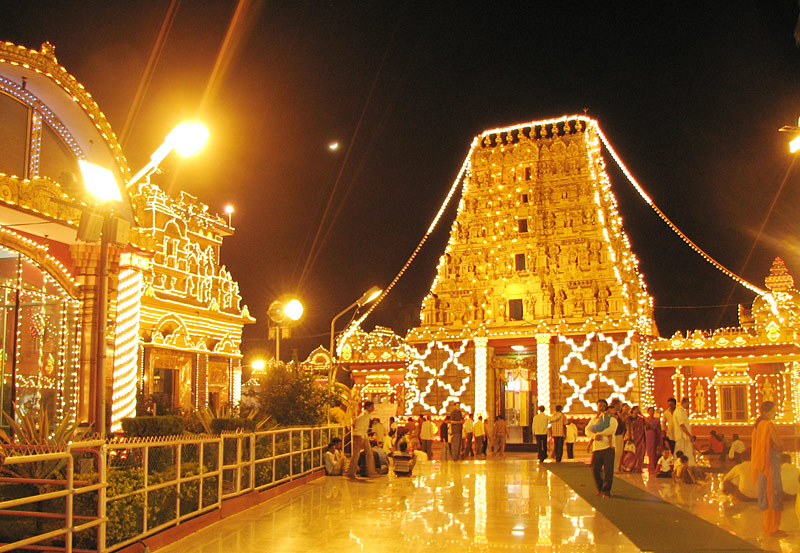
Navaratri decorations at Kudroli Hindu temple, Karnataka

In Karnataka, Navaratri is observed at home and by lighting up Hindu temples, cultural sites, and many regal processions. It is locally called Dasara and it is the state festival (Naadahabba) of Karnataka. Of the many celebrations, the Mysuru Dasara is a major one and is popular for its festivities.

The contemporary Dasara festivities at Mysore are credited to the efforts of King Raja Wodeyar I in 1610. On the ninth day of Dasara, called Mahanavami, the royal sword is worshipped and is taken on a procession of decorated elephants and horses. Also, Ayudha Puja is dedicated to Saraswati, in which military personnel upkeep their weapons and families upkeep their tools of livelihood, both offering a prayer to Saraswati, as well as Parvati and Lakshmi. The day after Navaratri, on Vijayadashami, the traditional Dasara procession is held on the streets of Mysore. An image of the Goddess Chamundeshwari is placed on a golden saddle (hauda) on the back of a decorated elephant and taken on a procession, accompanied by tableaux, dance groups, music bands, decorated elephants, horses, and camels.

Another Navaratri tradition in Karnataka has been decorating a part of one's home with art dolls called Gombe or Bombe, similar to Golu dolls of Tamil Nadu. An art-themed Gaarudi Gombe, featuring folk dances that incorporate these dolls, is also a part of the celebration.

=== Kerala ===
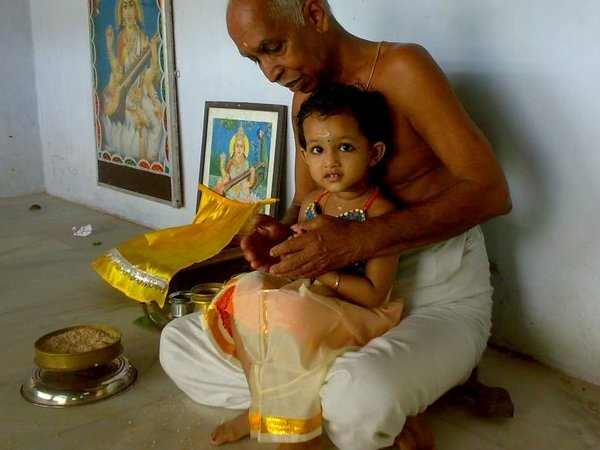
A family preparing for Saraswati puja on Navaratri.

In Kerala, the last days of Sharada Navaratri or Ashtami, Navami, and Vijayadashami are observed as significant days of worship and celebrated as Saraswati Puja in which books, tools, instruments, and weapons are worshipped. On the day of Durga Ashtami, a ceremony called Puja Vaipu is performed in which books, tools, instruments, and weapons are placed by Malayali Hindus at the altars in their own houses, traditional nursery schools, or in temples. The books, tools, instruments, and weapons are then worshipped in a puja dedicated to Saraswati. Fruits, rice, roasted paddy, and jaggery are offered to Saraswati during the puja on Ashtami. On the day of Maha Navami, the books, tools, instruments, and weapons are again worshipped in a puja dedicated to Saraswati. Maha Navami is a day when Malayali Hindus visit temples dedicated to goddesses such as Saraswati, Bhadrakali, Bhagavati, Lakshmi, and Parvati.

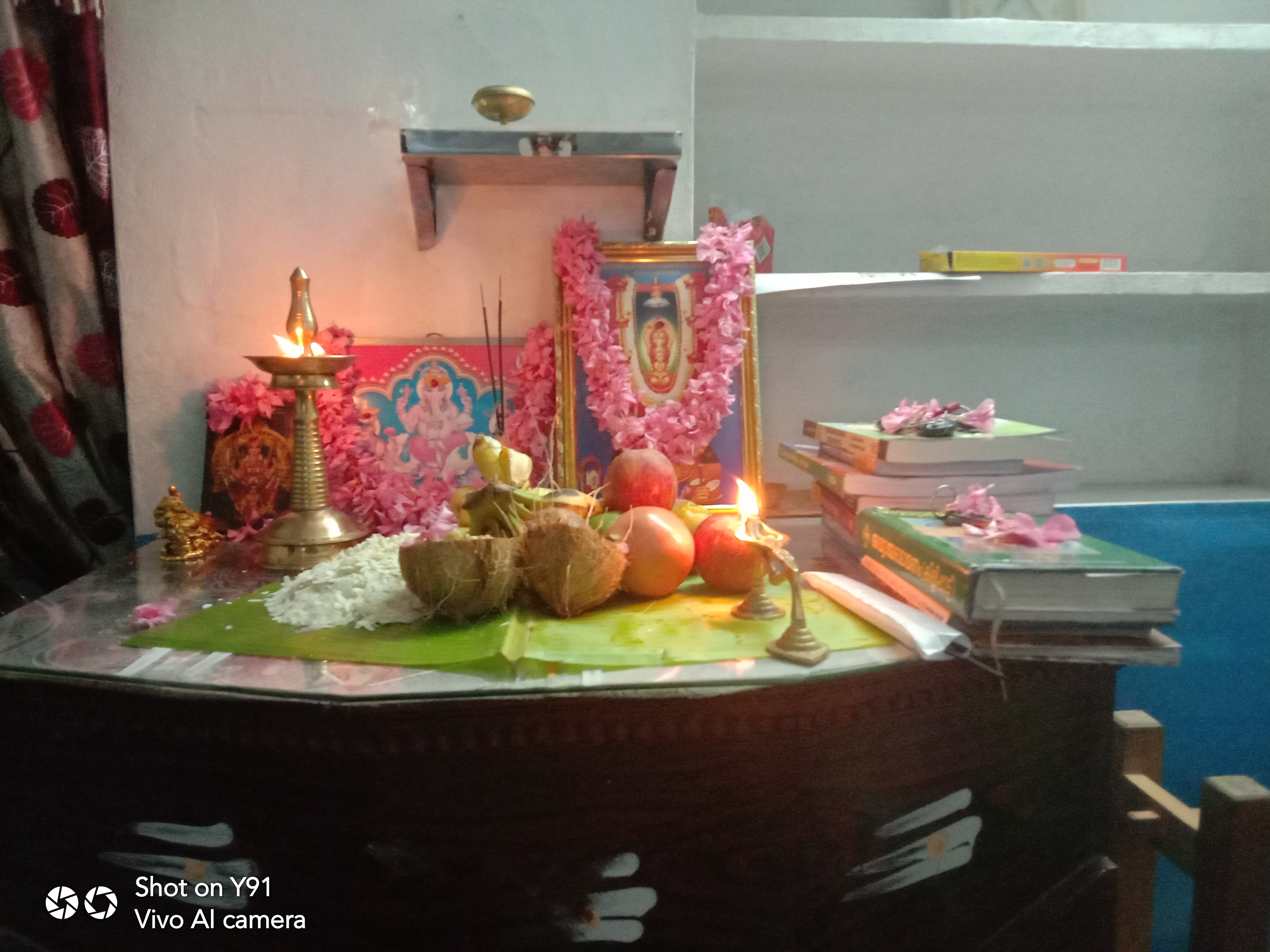
Books placed at an altar dedicated to Saraswati during Vijayadashami in a Hindu household in Kerala.

On Vijayadashami, the books, tools, instruments, and weapons are worshipped in a ritual called Ayudha Puja. Vijayadashami is considered auspicious for initiating the children into writing and reading, which is called Vidyarambham. Vidyarambham is the main rite during Vijayadashami in Kerala and consists of the imitation of learning. The Vidyarambham day tradition starts with the baby or child sitting on the lap of an elderly person such as the grandfather, near images of Saraswati and Ganesha. The elder writes a letter and the child writes the same with his or her index finger. This ritual is performed using a platter of rice or sand in which the elder and child write the letters and words using their fingers. After the Ayudha Puja, Saraswati Puja, and Vidyarambham of Vijayadashami, the books, tools, instruments, and weapons are blessed and taken out of the altar and returned to the owners in a ceremony called Puja Eduppu. The ceremonial return of the implements to the owners symbolizes the resumption of their studies or occupational work.

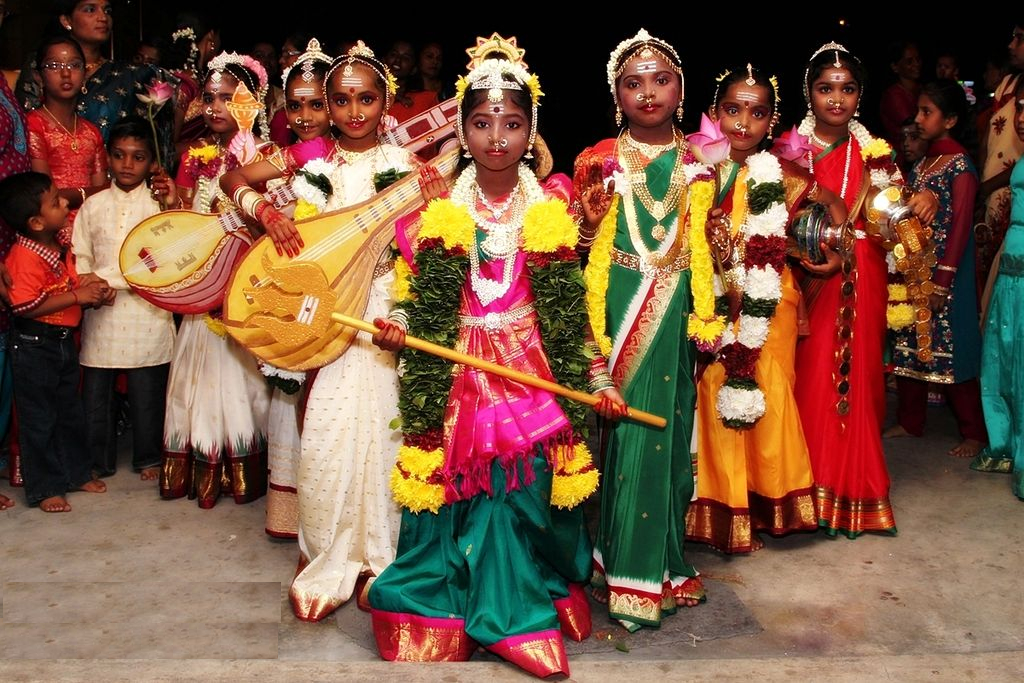
Girls dressed up for music and dance performance during Amman Navaratri

=== Tamil Nadu ===
Navaratri has been a historic tradition within Tamil Nadu, with Lakshmi, Saraswati, and Durga goddesses as the focus. Like the rest of India, the festival has been an occasion for performance arts, particularly Hindu temple dances such as Bharatanatyam and Mohiniyattam. Major palaces, community centers, and historic temples have embedded dance halls. For example, the Padmanabhapuram Palace built about 1600 CE has had a large dance hall with intricately carved pillars, a structure entirely made of stone. This dance hall has traditionally been known as Navaratri Mantapa. The festivities begin with Vedic chants inaugurating the dances and other ceremonies. Other Tamil Hindu temples, such as those associated with Sri Vaishnavism, also celebrate the Navaratri festivities.

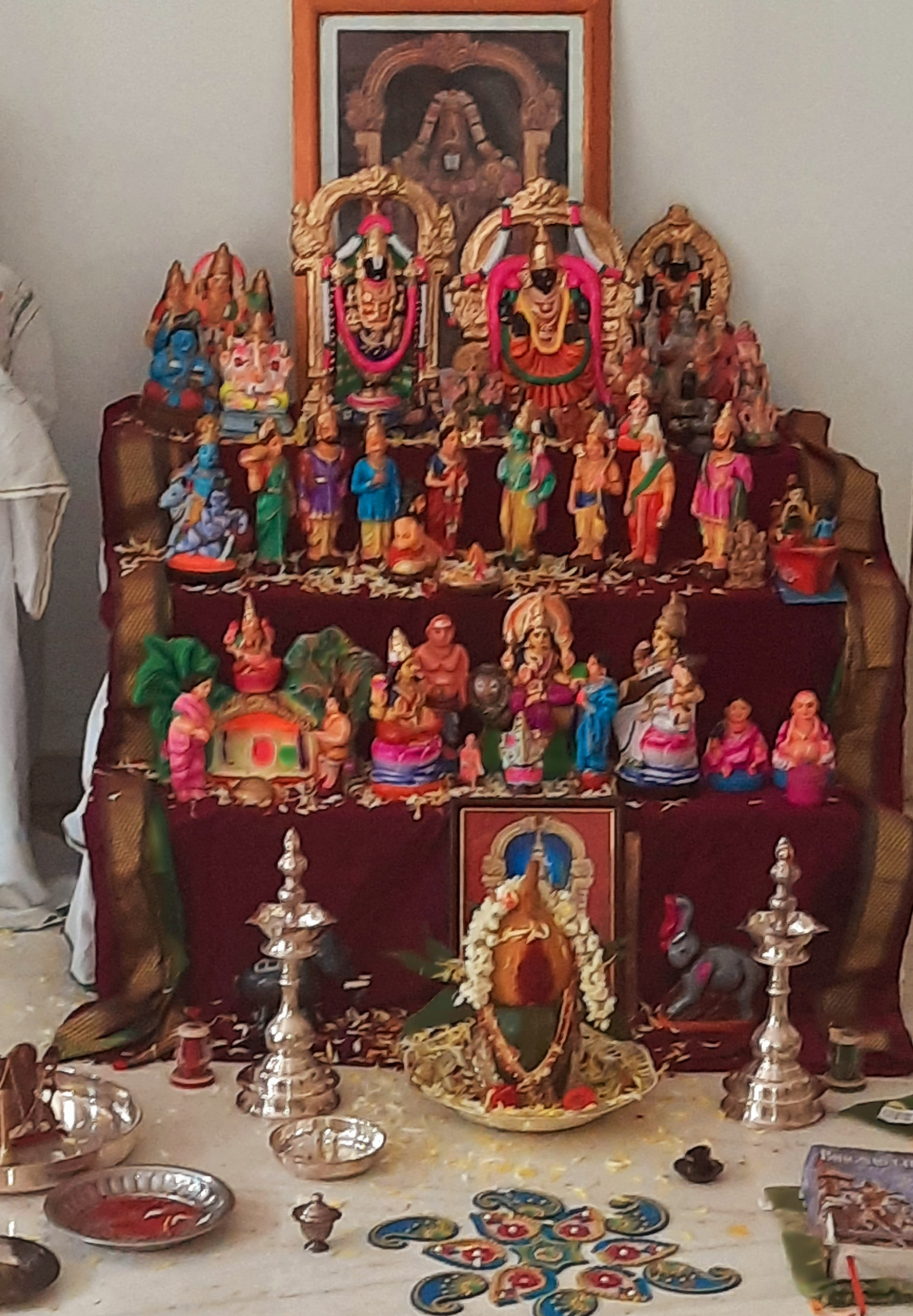
Navarathiri golu

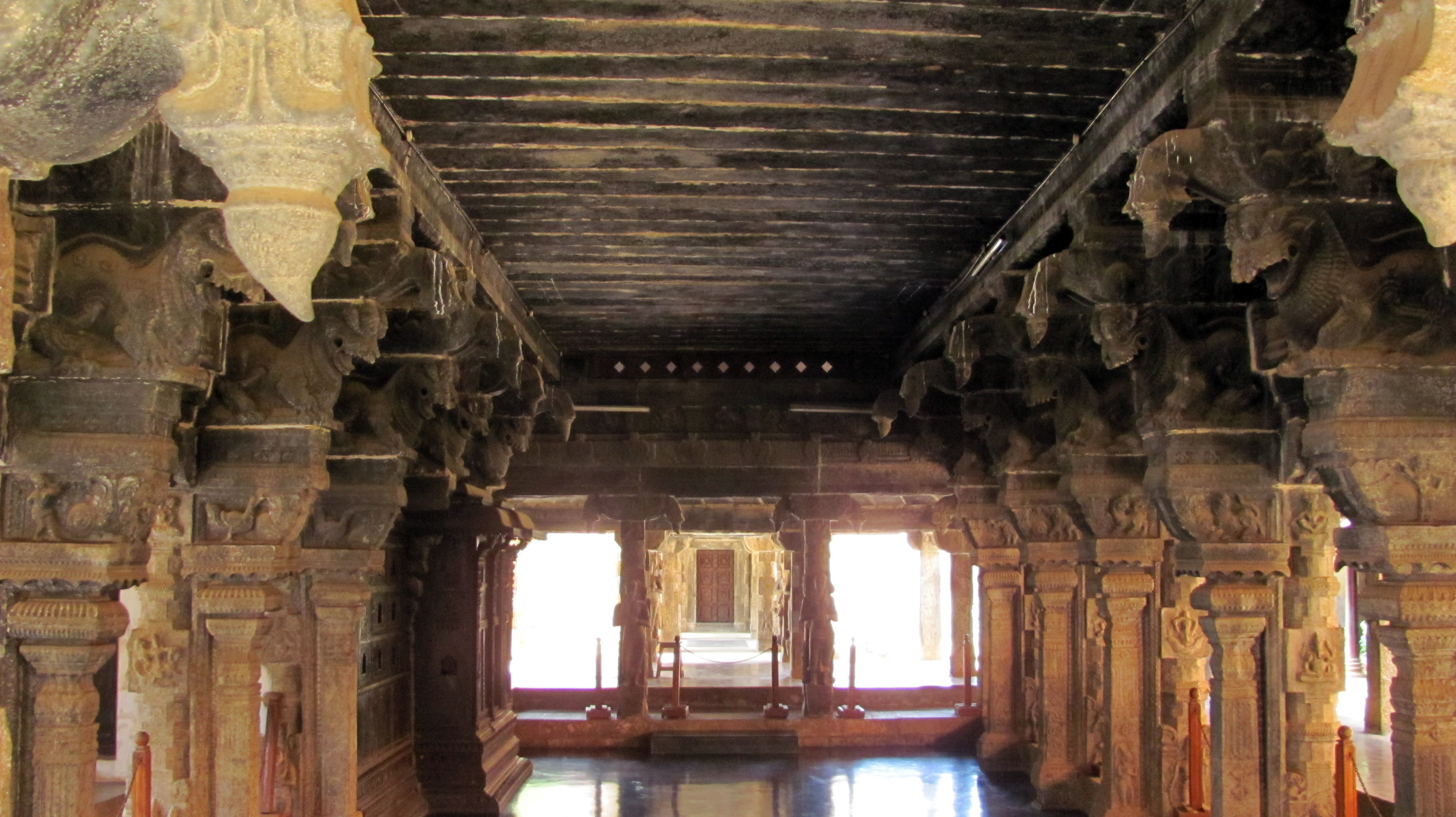
A large sculpted dance hall inside Padmanabhapuram Palace near Kanyakumari called Navaratri Mandapam. It features goddess Saraswati and large dance hall.

Another notable Tamil tradition is a celebration of the festival with Golu dolls (also spelled as Gollu). These include gods, goddesses, animals, birds and rural life all in a miniature design. People set up their own creative themes in their homes, called Kolu, friends and families invite each other to visit their homes to view Kolu displays, then exchange gifts and sweets. This tradition is also found in other parts of South India such as Andhra Pradesh where it called Bommala Koluvu, and Karnataka where it is called Gombe Habba or Gombe totti. Evidence of Gombe totti tradition as a Hindu celebration of the artisan arts goes back to at least the 14th-century Vijayanagara Empire. In the evening of Vijayadashami, any one doll from the "Kolu" is symbolically put to sleep and the Kalasa is moved a bit towards the North to mark the end of that year's Navaratri Kolu. The family offers a prayer of thanks, and wraps up the display.

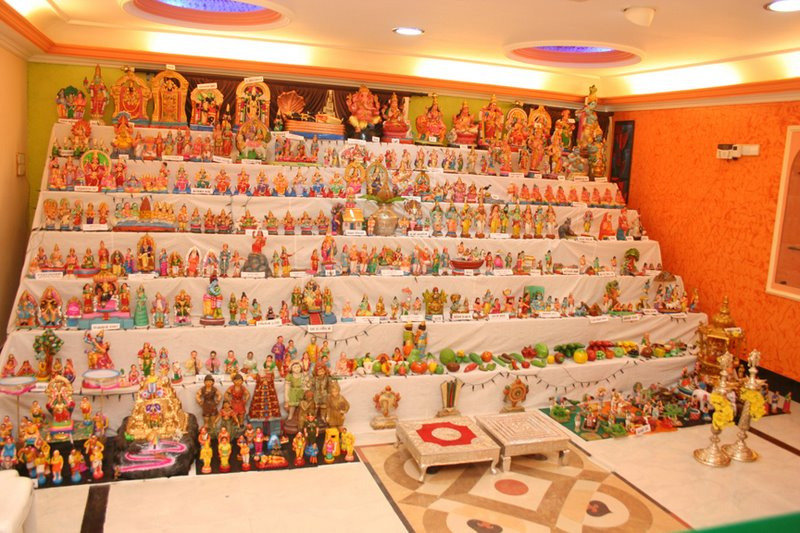
Golu dolls arrangement in Coimbatore, Tamil Nadu.

In temples of Tamil Nadu, Navaratri is celebrated for Durga's dwelling in each temple. The temples are decorated, ceremonial lamps are lit, and Vedic chantings are performed. Priests and visitors of some of these temples wear a special yellow coloured 'promise of protection' thread on their wrists, called kappu (Tamil) or raksha bandhana (Sanskrit). It is believed to symbolize a vow to the goddess and protection from the goddess against evil.

=== Telangana and Andhra Pradesh ===
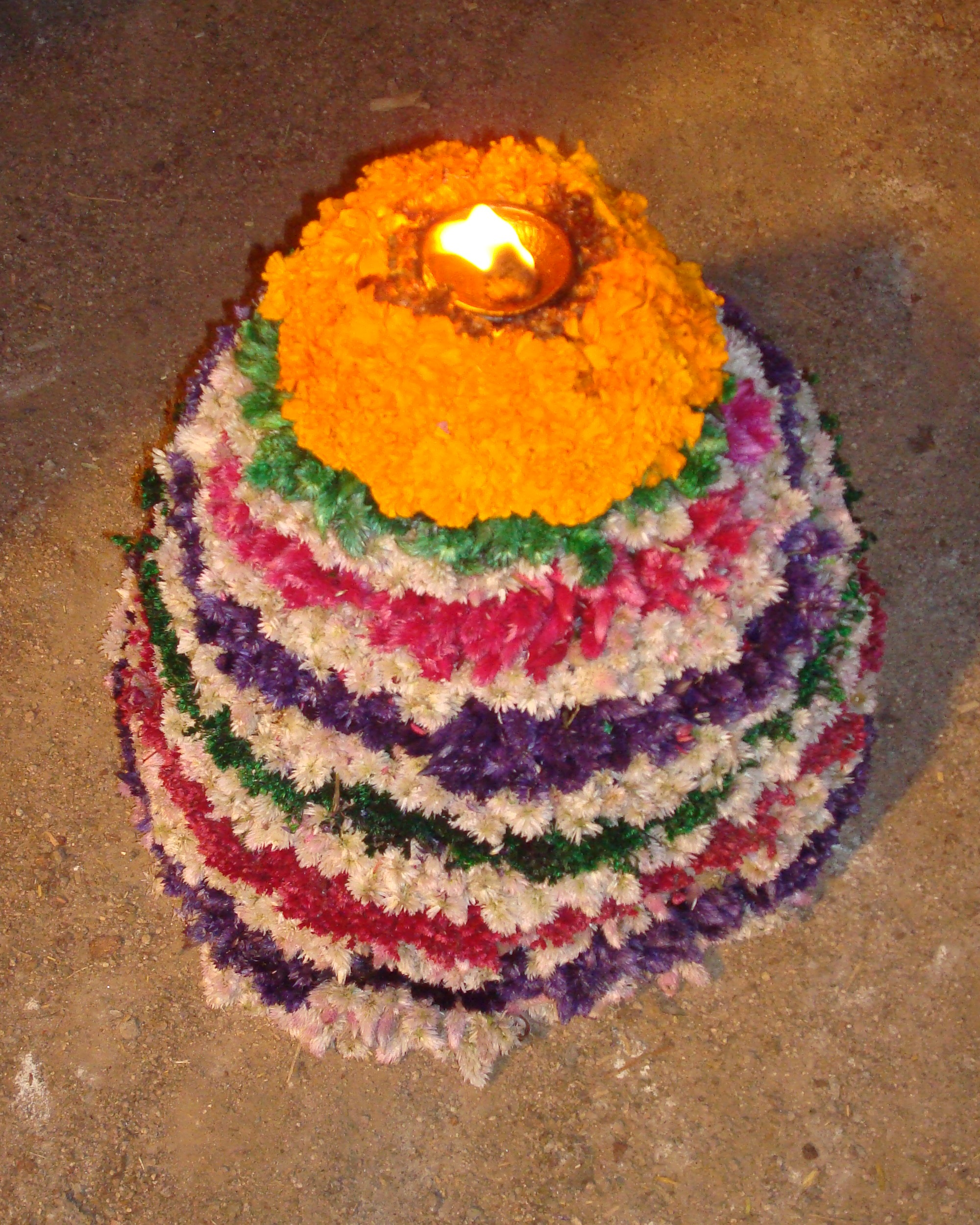
A lamp above a Bathukamma flower arrangement, a Telugu Navaratri tradition.

In Telangana and Andhra Pradesh, Navaratri is celebrated similarly as in the rest of India and it ends with Dasara. During the Navaratri nights, a notable tradition involves Telugu Hindu women who create Bathukamma for Navaratri goddesses. It is an artistic flower decorations driven event, particularly using marigolds, which revere three different aspects Devi, called Tridevi. In 2016, 9,292 women simultaneously participated to create a 20 feet high flower arrangements, one of the world's largest festive flower arrangement.

Bathukamma celebrations will be started with the Mahalaya Amavasya (Pitru Amavasya), a day before Navaratri starts. The main deity of worship is goddess Gowri, a form of goddess Durga, who is symbolized with an idol made from turmeric powder and is placed on a floral arrangement called bathukamma. The festival will go for nine nights with women whirling around the bathukamma clapping their hands or sticks along with the recitation of the Ramayana, stories of Shiva, Gowri, Ganga, and common day-to-day life of women in the form of rhythmic songs. Every night, bathukamma is immersed in nearby water resources and a new bathukamma is made next day. This nine nights festival ends with Durgashtami, when Durga is believed to be worshiped in the form of Maha Gowri.

Like elsewhere in India, Ayudha Puja is observed by Telugu Hindus where weapons are maintained, decorated, and worshiped. Tradesmen and farmers similarly clean up, decorate, and worship their own equipment of the trade. On the 10th day, Dussehra (Vijayadashami), grand feasts are arranged with family members and friends.

=== Nepal ===
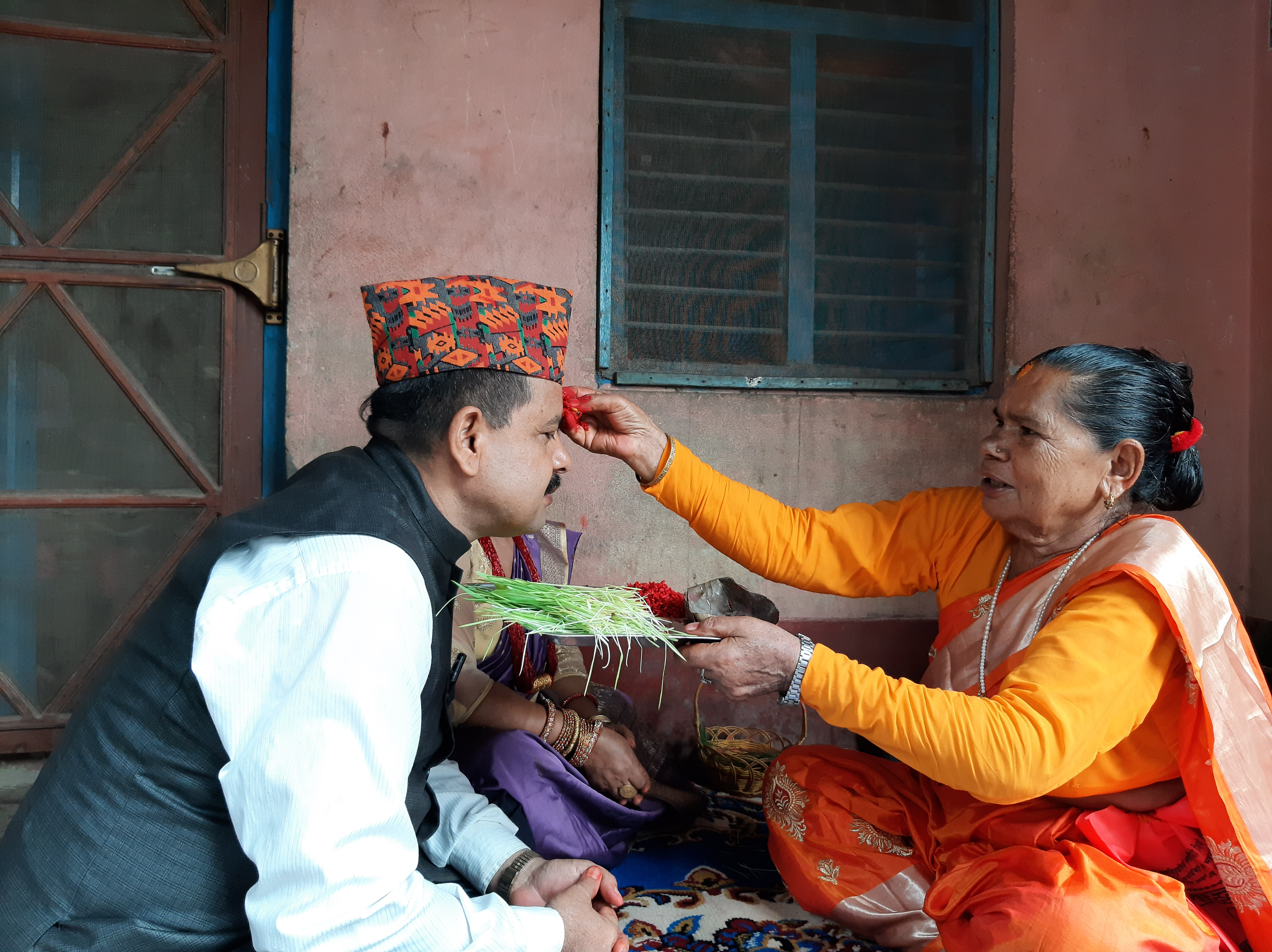
A Nepali mother applying tika, the mixture of rice, yogurt, and vermillion on her son’s forehead during Dashain.

In Nepal, Navaratri is celebrated as Dashain or Nauratha. On the first day, barley which is known as jamara in Nepali is sowed in a pot and kept in a dark room. The nine days of the festival are observed with vibrant processions and fairs throughout Nepal. Devi temples and Shakti pithas in Nepal experience a high increase in footfall during this time. On the ninth day or Maha Navami, animal sacrifices are performed by trade workers such as artisans, carpenters, mechanics, and craftsmen who dedicate the sacrifices to Durga. Maha Navami is also the only day when the renown Taleju Temple in Kathmandu is opened to the general public. The tenth day or Bijaya Dashami is a day of elders blessing the youth of the family. A mixture of rice, yogurt, and vermillion called tika is prepared and anointed on the forehead of younger relatives by the elders on Bijaya Dashami. In Nepal, the festival continues after the tenth day for five more days and concludes on the full moon of the Ashvin month.

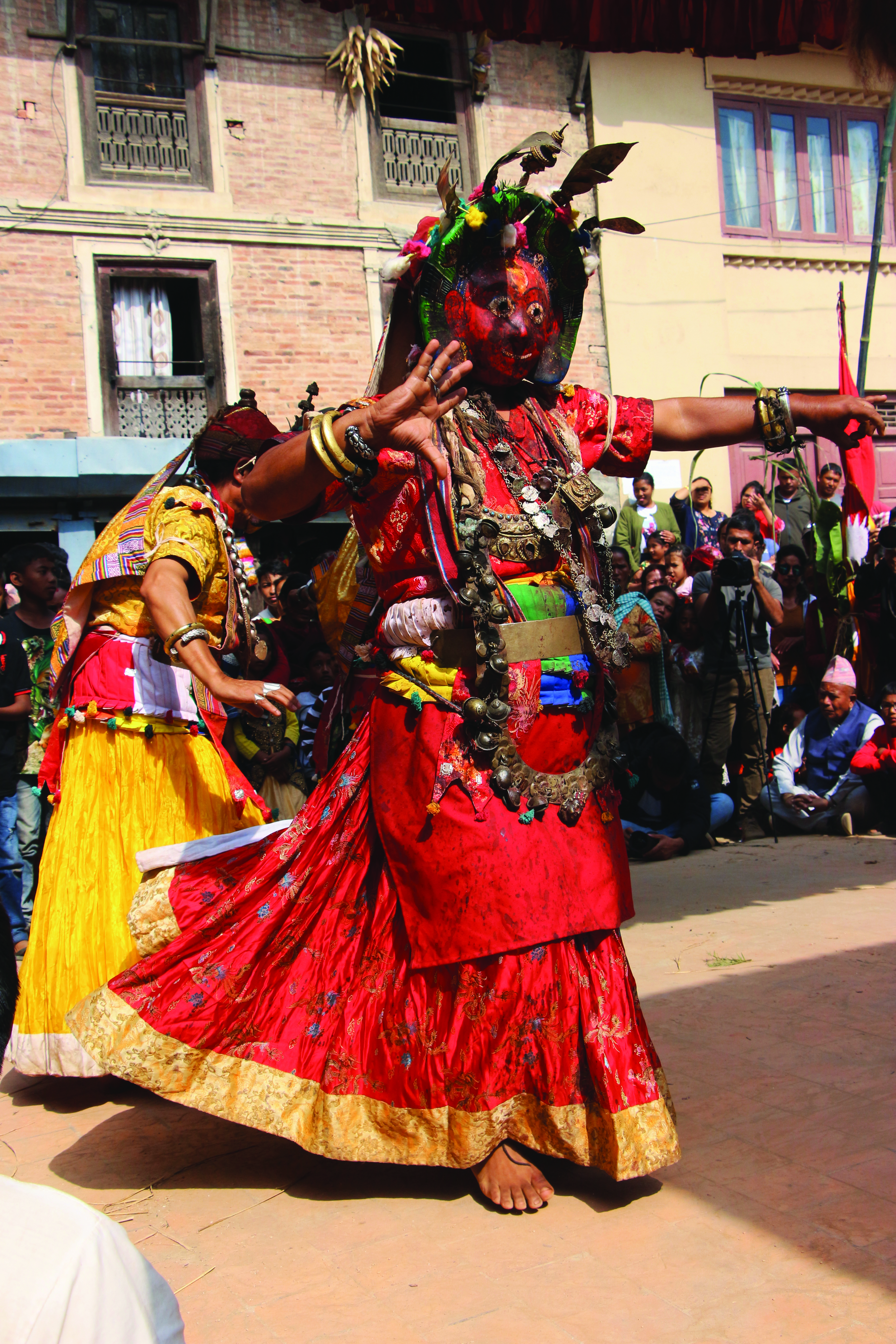
A masked dancer depicting a Hindu god performing in the Shikali Jatra of Khokana during the festival of Dashain-Mohani.

The Newar Hindu and Newar Buddhist communities of Nepal also celebrate Dashain or Navaratri as Mohani. The Newar people share many of the same traditions and customs as Nepalis who celebrate Dashain but hold more emphasis on the worship of their tutelary deities. Throughout the Kathmandu Valley, the Newar people hold processions to honour their tutelary deities during Mohani. In Kathmandu, a procession called Bhairav Jatra dedicated to Pachali Bhairav is held on the fifth day of Mohani. In Bhaktapur, a procession dedicated to the nine forms of Durga is held with nine dancers wearing masks of the Navadurga. Similarly, a dance depicting the Ashta Matrika is held on the first day in Lalitpur. The Shikali Jatra procession takes place on the seventh day of the festival in Khokana in which 14 masked dancers perform as Hindu gods. The Shikali Jatra is held in the honour of a local goddess named Shikali who is believed to be the sister of Dakshinakali in Newar tradition. A procession dedicated to Manakamana is held in Bunga on the ninth day. Some Newar communities hold processions called Paya in which the participants parade through the streets while holding swords and wearing masks of deities such as Bhairava. This time is observed with the playing and listening of Malshree dhun, a form of Newar classical devotional music. Kite flying is a common tradition amongst the Newar people in the Kathmandu Valley during this festival.

The festivals of Dashain and Mohani are also dedicated to the goddess Taleju Bhawani, who is held as the guardian of the Kathmandu Valley and a Tantric form of Durga in Nepali tradition. The worship of Taleju Bhawani in Nepal is documented as occurring as early as the 14th century in the Kathmandu Valley. The goddess Taleju Bhawani is linked to the tradition of the living goddess known as Kumari. In Nepal, a prepubescent girl belonging to the Newar Buddhist Shakya clan is recognized as an incarnation of Taleju Bhawani after showing physical signs of auspiciousness, being tested for astrological compatibility, and passing ritual tests. After passing the tests and being accepted as the Kumari, the girl is usually enthroned in a Kumari residence and is worshipped by the public as a living goddess until her tenure ends at her first menstruation. The festivals of Dashain and Mohani are significant for the Kumari as she is ceremonially carried out in a palanquin through the streets during processions so devotees can receive her blessings. This ritual is regarded as an embodiment of the divine sovereignty of the girl.

== Textual mentions ==
Early mentions of Navaratri rituals are found in vernacular texts of the Ramayana, such as the Bengali Krittivasi Ramayana, whereby Rama is described as offering Durga puja. In the epic Mahabharata, Durga is praised twice in the chapters of Virata Parva and Bhishma Parva. Rituals are also found in Puranic texts such as the Markandeya Purana, Devi Purana, Kalika Purana and Devi Bhagavata Purana.

== Animal sacrifice ==
Although rare, animal sacrifice is a part of some Durga puja celebrations during Navaratri in the eastern states of India. The goddess is offered a sacrificial animal in this ritual in the belief that it stimulates her violent vengeance against the buffalo demon. According to Christopher Fuller, the animal sacrifice practice is rare among Hindus during Navaratri, or at other times, outside the Shaktism tradition found in the eastern Indian states of West Bengal, Odisha, and Assam. Even in these states, the festival season is one where significant animal sacrifices are observed. In some Shakta Hindu communities, the slaying of the buffalo demon and the victory of Durga are observed with a symbolic sacrifice instead of animal sacrifice. (Note: In these cases, Shaktism devotees consider animal sacrifice distasteful, practice alternate means of expressing devotion while respecting the views of others in their tradition. A statue of asura demon made of flour, or equivalent, is immolated and smeared with vermilion to remember the blood that had necessarily been spilled during the war. Other substitutes include a vegetal or sweet dish considered equivalent to the animal.)

The Rajput of Rajasthan worship their weapons and horses on Navaratri, and formerly offered a sacrificial goat to a goddess revered as Kuldevi – a practice that continues in some places. The ritual requires the slaying of the animal with a single stroke. In the past, this ritual was considered a rite of passage into manhood and readiness as a warrior.

The tradition of animal sacrifice is being substituted with vegetarian offerings to the Goddess in temples and households around Banaras in Northern India.

== Outside Indian subcontinent ==
The Hindu diaspora that migrated as indentured servants during colonial era to various plantations and mines around the world, as well as those who migrated on their own, continued to mark their Navaratri traditions. Hindus in Malaysia, Singapore and Thailand for example, built Hindu temples in southeast Asia in the 19th century, and Navaratri has been one of their major traditional festivals. In Trinidad and Tobago, Guyana, Suriname, Fiji, Mauritius, Canada, South Africa, the United States, and the United Kingdom, Navaratri and Diwali have been one of the most visible celebrations of the local Hindu communities from about mid 20th-century.

Beyond South Asia, Durga Puja is organized by Bengali, Odia, Assamese and the Nepali communities in the United States of America. Durga Puja celebrations have also been started in Hong Kong by the Hindu Indian Bengali diaspora.

In Canada, Bengali Hindu communities both from Bangladesh and West Bengal, India organise several Durga Pujas. Greater Toronto Area has the most number of Durga Puja celebration venues organized by different Bengali cultural groups such as Bangladesh Canada Hindu Cultural Society (BCHCS), Bongo Poribar Sociocultural Association etc. City of Toronto has a dedicated Durga Temple named Toronto Durgabari where Durga Puja is organized along with other Hindu celebrations. Most of the puja venues of Toronto area try to arrange the puja in best possible way to follow the lunar calendar and timings.

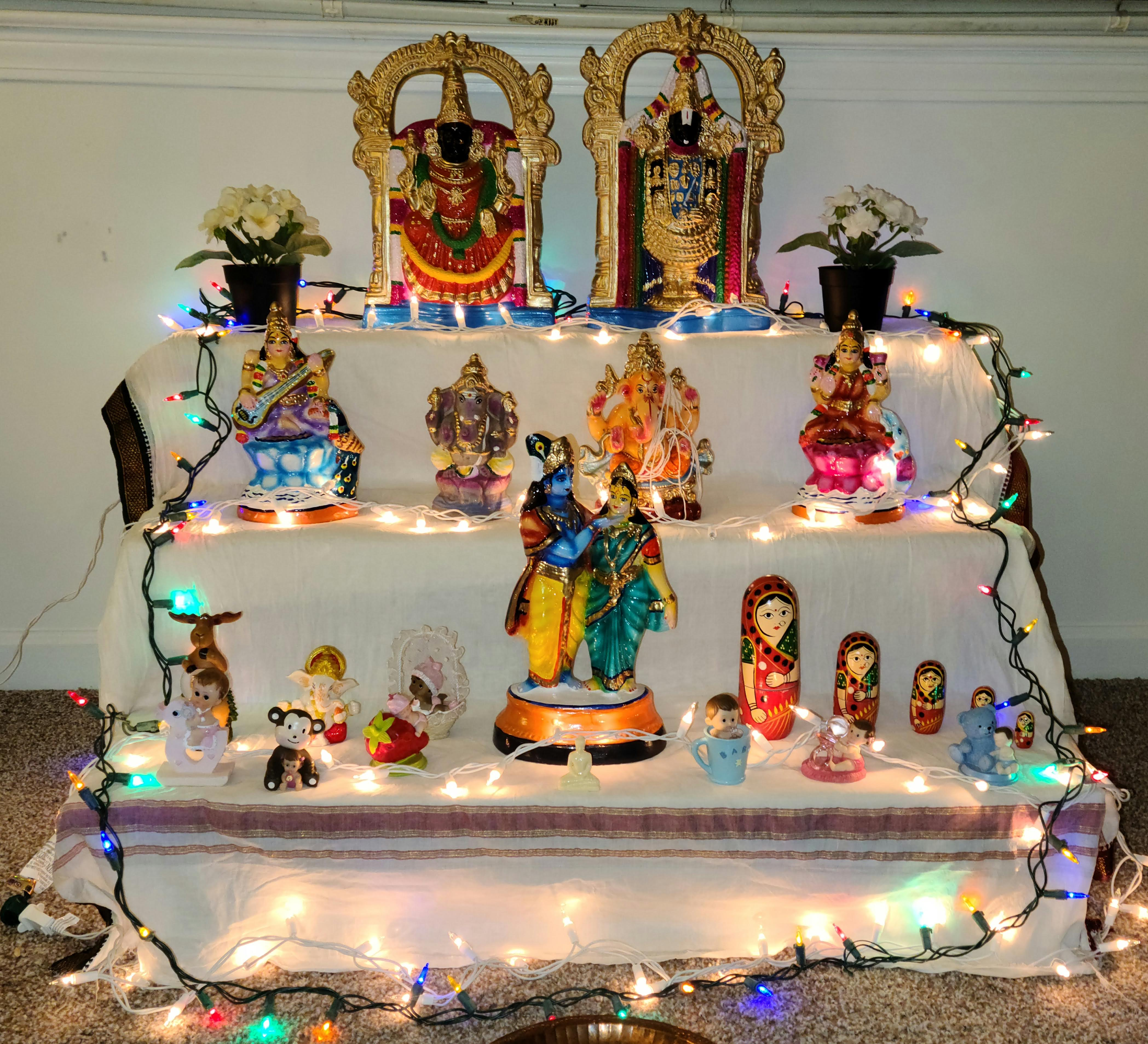
Simple Golu in New Jersey

== Other religions ==
Navaratri and goddess worship is mentioned in the historic Sikhism literature, particularly in the Dasam Granth traditionally attributed to Guru Gobind Singh. According to Louis Fenech, the Sikhs have historically mirrored the reverence for Devi Shakti and the worship of weapons in a manner similar to those by Shakta Hindus. The second Guru of Sikhism, Guru Angad, was an ardent devotee of goddess Durga.

The Jains have observed the social and cultural celebrations of Navaratri with Hindus, such as the folk dances. The stavan poetry of Jainism, states M. Whitney Kelting, "draw much of their imagery from the garba poems" of Hinduism.

It takes place at the same time as the Nine Emperor Gods Festival.

== Scenes from different places ==
=== jabalpur, M.P ===
Durga idol of hitkarini Dham-Jabalpur in Navratri 2025

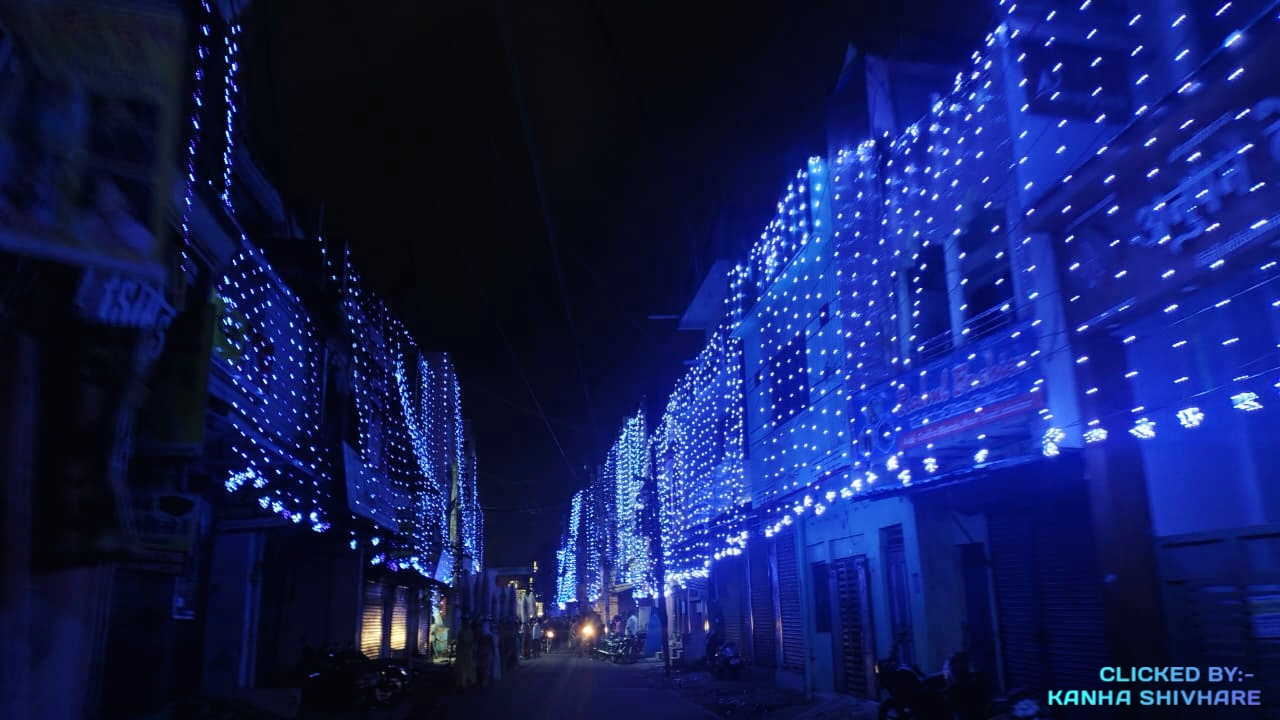
Night view of Jabalpur during Navratri

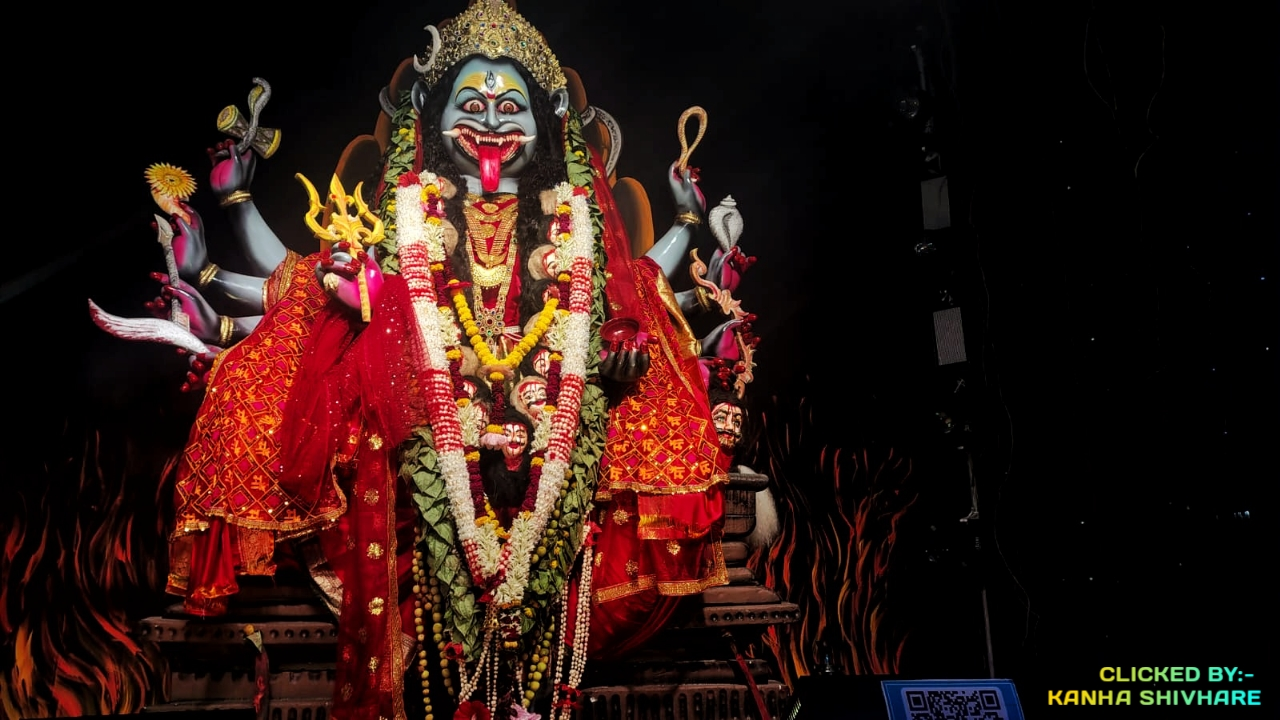
Devi pratyangira at jabalpur - kotwali during Navratri

== See also ==
- Bathukamma – Flower festival in India
- Dashain – Regional Hindu festival
- Durga Puja – Annual Hindu festival
- Garba – Indian folk dance
- Jhandewalan Temple – Hindu temple in Delhi, India
- Jwala Devi Temple – Temple in Shaktinagar, Sonbhadra, Uttar Pradesh, India
- Jyoti Kalash – Earthen lamps upon pots used in Hindu veneration
- Mysore Dasara – State-festival of Karnataka, India
- Nine Emperor Gods Festival – Taoist celebration in Southeast Asia
- Vijayadashami – Major Hindu festival

== Bibliography ==
- Amazzone, Laura (2012). Goddess Durga and Sacred Female Power. University Press of America. ISBN 9780761853145. Archived from the original on 17 March 2020.
- Coburn, Thomas B. (1991). Encountering the Goddess: A translation of the Devi-Mahatmya and a Study of Its Interpretation. State University of New York Press. ISBN 0791404463. Archived from the original on 5 February 2017.
- Cynthia Bradley (2012). Denise Cush; Catherine Robinson; Michael York (eds.). Encyclopedia of Hinduism. Routledge. ISBN 978-1-135-18979-2. Archived from the original on 24 December 2016.
- Alain Daniélou (1991). The Myths and Gods of India: The Classic Work on Hindu Polytheism from the Princeton Bollingen Series. Inner Traditions / Bear & Co. ISBN 978-0-89281-354-4. Archived from the original on 17 March 2022.
- Lynn Foulston; Stuart Abbott (2009). Hindu Goddesses: Beliefs and Practices. Sussex Academic Press. ISBN 978-1-902210-43-8.
- Constance Jones; James D. Ryan (2006). Encyclopedia of Hinduism. Infobase Publishing. ISBN 978-0-8160-7564-5. Archived from the original on 23 March 2017.
- David Kinsley (1988). Hindu Goddesses: Visions of the Divine Feminine in the Hindu Religious Tradition. University of California Press. ISBN 978-0-520-90883-3. Archived from the original on 1 April 2019.
- David R. Kinsley (1989). The Goddesses' Mirror: Visions of the Divine from East and West. State University of New York Press. ISBN 978-0-88706-835-5. Archived from the original on 17 February 2017.
- James G. Lochtefeld (2002). The Illustrated Encyclopedia of Hinduism: N-Z. The Rosen Publishing Group. ISBN 0-8239-2287-1. Archived from the original on 28 December 2016.
- London, Ellen (2004). Bangladesh. Gareth Stevens. ISBN 978-0-8368-3107-8. Archived from the original on 24 February 2017.
- Malcolm McLean (1998). Devoted to the Goddess: The Life and Work of Ramprasad. State University of New York Press. ISBN 978-0-7914-3689-9. Archived from the original on 17 February 2017.
- June McDaniel (2004). Offering Flowers, Feeding Skulls: Popular Goddess Worship in West Bengal. Oxford University Press. ISBN 978-0-19-534713-5. Archived from the original on 4 January 2017.
- Rachel Fell McDermott (2001). Mother of My Heart, Daughter of My Dreams: Kali and Uma in the Devotional Poetry of Bengal. Oxford University Press. ISBN 978-0-19-803071-3. Archived from the original on 17 February 2017.
- Rocher, Ludo (1986). The Puranas. Otto Harrassowitz Verlag. ISBN 978-3447025225.
- Hillary Rodrigues (2003). Ritual Worship of the Great Goddess: The Liturgy of the Durga Puja with Interpretations. SUNY Press. ISBN 978-0-7914-8844-7. Archived from the original on 8 November 2020.
- Sarkar, Bihani (2020). "Toward a History of the Navarātra, the Autumnal Festival of the Goddess". In Goodall, Dominic; Hatley, Shaman; Isaacson, Harunaga; Raman, Srilata (eds.). Śaivism and the Tantric Traditions: Essays in Honour of Alexis G.J.S. Sanderson. Gonda Indological Studies. Vol. 22. Leiden: Brill Publishers. pp. 321–345. doi:10.1163/9789004432802_015. ISBN 978-90-04-43266-6.
- Tripathi, Salil (2016). The Colonel Who Would Not Repent: The Bangladesh War and Its Unquiet Legacy. Yale University Press. ISBN 978-0-300-21818-3. Archived from the original on 15 April 2017.
- "Navratri – Hindu festival". Encyclopedia Britannica. 21 February 2017. Archived from the original on 22 February 2017.
