= Badami cave temples =

6th-8th century Hindu and Jain cave temples in Karnataka, India

Badami Temple
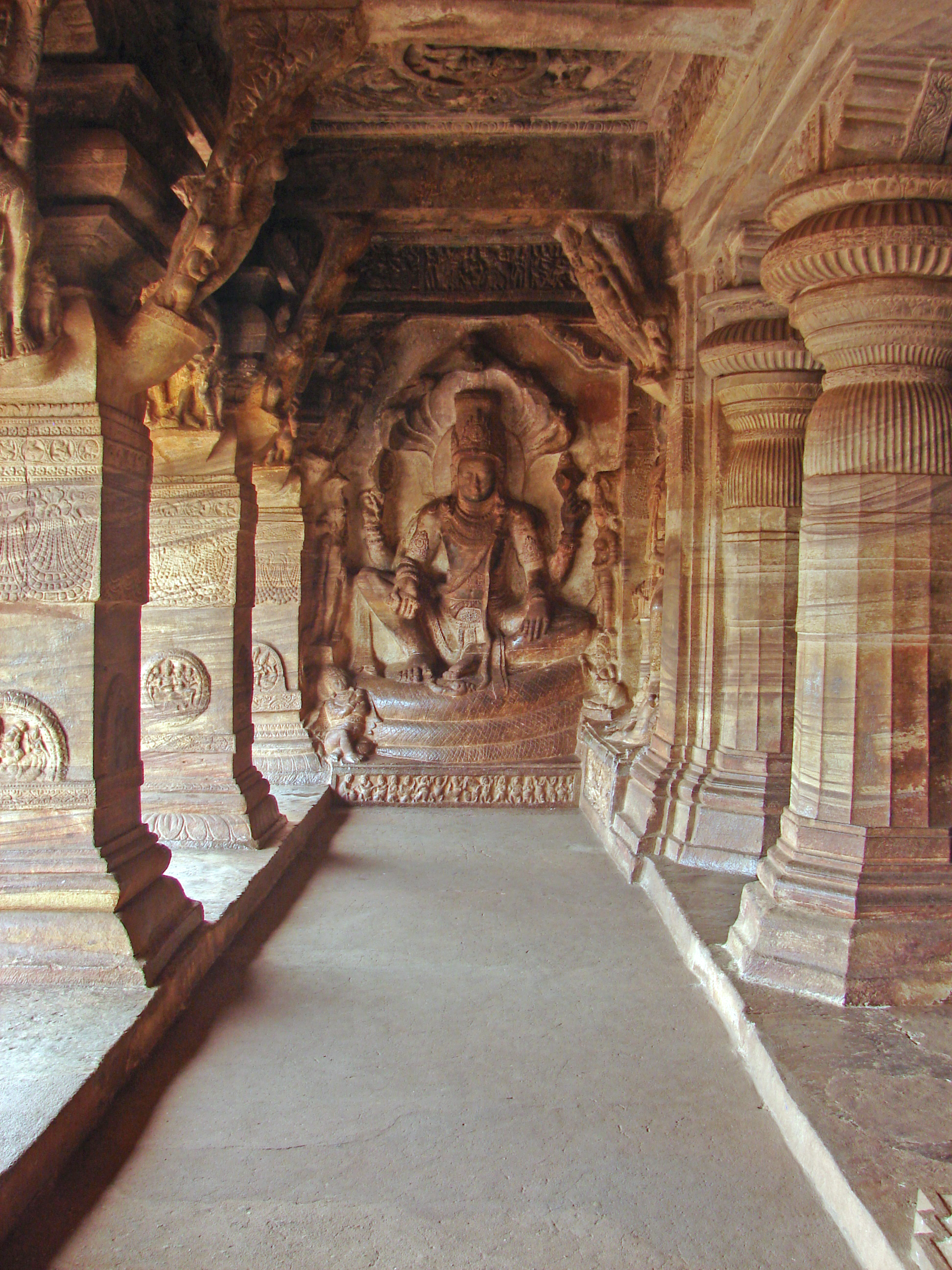
- Vishnu image in Badami cave 3

- Location within Karnataka Location within India
- Coordinates: 15°55′06″N 75°41′3″E
- Discovery: 6th Century
- Geology: Sandstone
- Features: UNESCO world heritage site candidate

The Badami cave temples are a complex of Buddhist, Hindu and Jain cave temples located in Badami, a town in the Bagalkot district in northern part of Karnataka, India. The caves are important examples of Indian rock-cut architecture, especially Badami Chalukya architecture, and the earliest date from the 6th century. Badami is a modern name and was previously known as "Vataapi", the capital of the early Chalukya dynasty, which ruled much of Karnataka from the 6th to the 8th century. Badami is situated on the west bank of a man-made lake ringed by an earthen wall with stone steps; it is surrounded on the north and south by forts built during Early Chalukya and in later times.

The Badami cave temples represent some of the earliest known examples of Hindu temples in the Deccan region. They along with the temples in Aihole transformed the Mallaprabha River valley into a cradle of temple architecture that influenced the components of later Hindu temples elsewhere in India.

The 4 caves are all in the escarpment of the hill in soft Badami sandstone formation, to the south-east of the town. In Cave 1, among various sculptures of Hindu divinities and themes, a prominent carving is of the dancing Shiva as Nataraja. Cave 2 is mostly similar to Cave 1 in terms of its layout and dimensions, featuring Hindu subjects of which the Hari Hara, Ardhanari shiva, Mahishamardini, Dwi Bahu Ganesha and Skanda in a separate antichamber on extended cave at western side-next to great Nataraja sculpture. Cave 2 has premier images of relief of Vishnu as Trivikrama is the largest. The largest cave is Cave 3, featuring Vishnu as Ananta seated on coiled serpent, Varaha with Bhudevi, Harihara, Narasimha in standing posture, great image of Trivikrama and Virata Vishnu. The cave has fine carvings exhibiting matured stage of Karnataka ancient art. Cave 4 is dedicated to revered figures of Jainism. Around the lake, Badami has additional caves of which one may be a Buddhist cave. Another Cave like gallery known as Arali Tirtha has around twenty seven carvings.

== Geography ==
The Badami cave temples are located in the town of Badami in the north-central part of Karnataka, India. The temples are about 88 miles (142 km) east of Belagavi (IATA Code: IXT), and 87 miles (140 km) northwest of Hampi. The Malaprabha River is 3 miles (4.8 km) away. The cave temples are 14 miles (23 km) from the UNESCO World Heritage Site Pattadakal, and 22 miles (35 km) from Aihole – another site with over a hundred ancient and early-medieval-era Hindu, Jain, and Buddhist monuments.

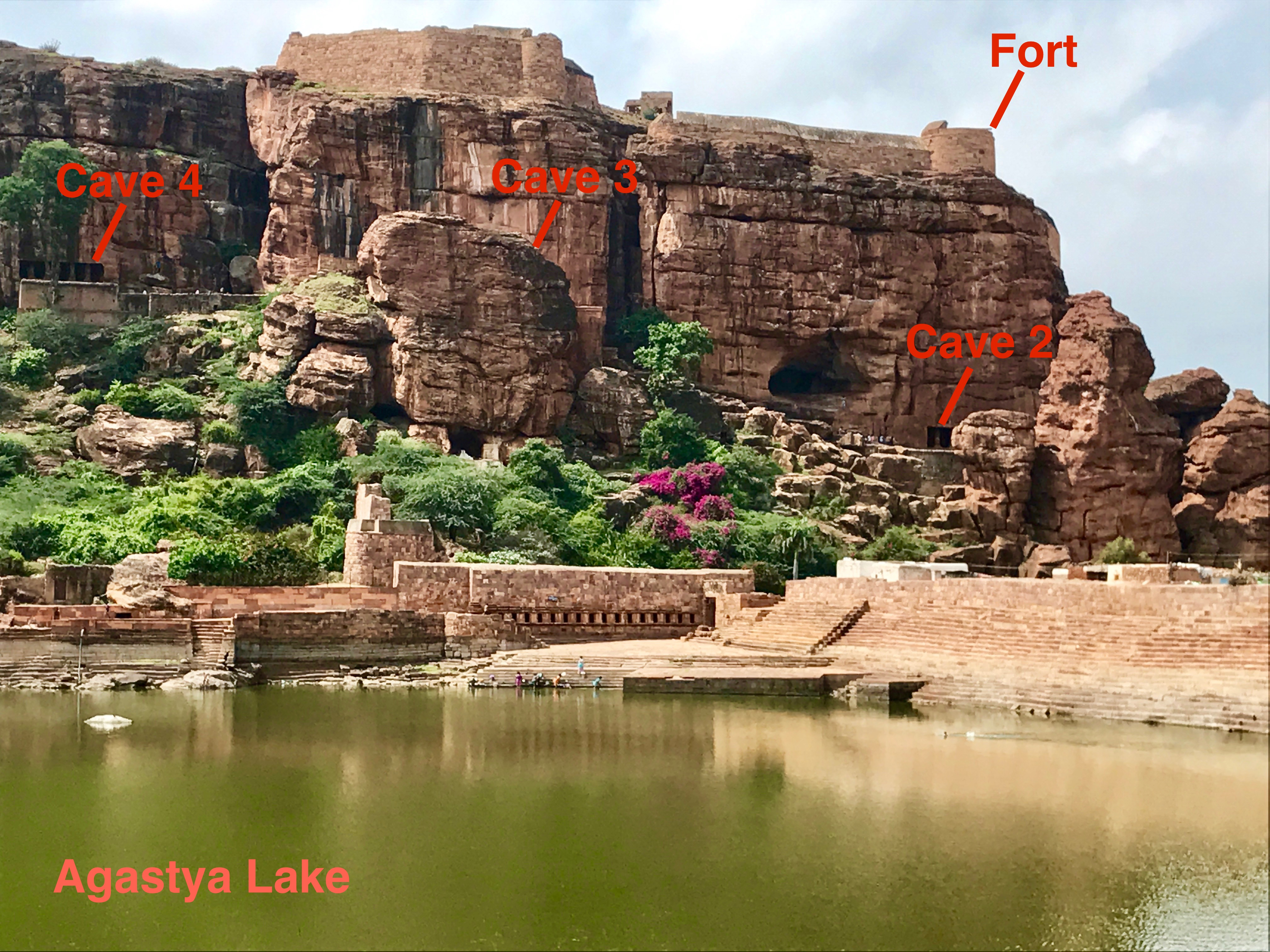
Caves on the cliff above Agastya Lake

Badami, also referred to as Vatapi, Vatapipura, Vatapinagari and Agastya Tirtha in historical texts, the capital of Chalukya dynasty in the 6th century, is at the exit point of a ravine between two steep mountain cliffs. Four cave temples in the escarpment of the hill to the south-east of the town were carved into the cliff's monolithic stone face. The escarpment is above a man-made lake called Agastya Teertha, created by an earthen dam faced with stone steps. To the west end of this cliff, at its lowest point, is the first cave temple. The largest and highest cave is Cave 3, which is further to the east on the northern face of the hill. The fourth cave, Cave 4, is a few steps down further east.

== History ==
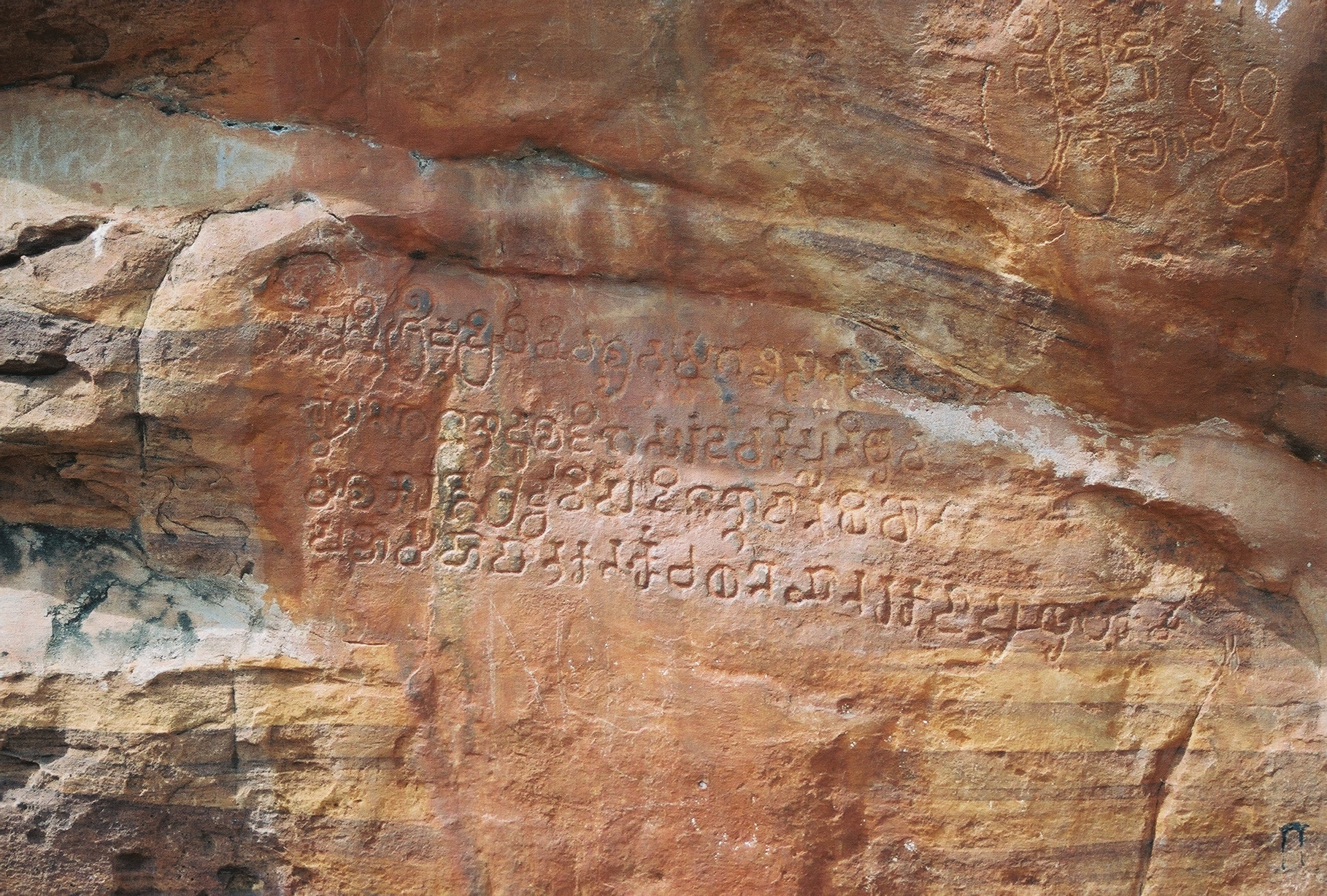
Epigraphy in the Kannada language (c. 578) dating the carving of Cave 3

The cave temples, numbered 1 to 4 in the order of their creation, in the town of Badami – the capital city of the Chalukya kingdom (also known as Early Chalukyas) – are dated from the late 6th century onwards. The exact dating is known only for Cave 3, which is a temple dedicated to Vishnu. An inscription found here records the dedication of the shrine by Mangalesha in Saka 500 (solar calendar, 578/579 CE). The inscription, written in the old Kannada language, has enabled the dating of these rock cave temples to the 6th century. This makes the cave the oldest firmly-dated Hindu cave temple in India.

The Badami Caves complex is part of a UNESCO-designated World Heritage Site candidate under the title "Evolution of Temple Architecture – Aihole-Badami-Pattadakal" in the Malaprabha river valley, considered a cradle of temple architecture that formed the model for later Hindu temples in the region. The artwork in Caves 1 and 2 exhibit the northern Deccan style of the 6th and 7th centuries, while those in Cave 3 simultaneously represent two ancient Indian artistic traditions; the northern Nagara and the southern Dravida styles. Cave 3 also shows icons and reliefs in the so-called Vesara style, a fusion of ideas from the two styles, as well as some of the earliest surviving historical examples in Karnataka of yantra-chakra motifs (geometric symbolism) and colored fresco paintings. The first three caves feature sculptures of Hindu icons and legends focusing on Shiva and Vishnu, while Cave 4 features Jain icons and themes.

== Temple caves ==
The Badami cave temples are carved out of soft Badami sandstone on a hill cliff. The plan of each of the four caves (1 to 4) includes an entrance with a verandah (mukha mantapa) supported by stone columns and brackets, a distinctive feature of these caves, leading to a columned mantapa, or main hall (also maha mantapa), and then to the small, square shrine (sanctum sanctorum, garbha ghriya) cut deep inside the cave. The cave temples are linked by a stepped path with intermediate terraces overlooking the town and lake. The cave temples are labelled 1–4 in their ascending series; this numbering does not reflect the sequence of excavation.

The architecture includes structures built in the Nagara and Dravidian styles, which is the first and most persistent architectural idiom to be adopted by the early chalukyas.

=== Cave 1 ===
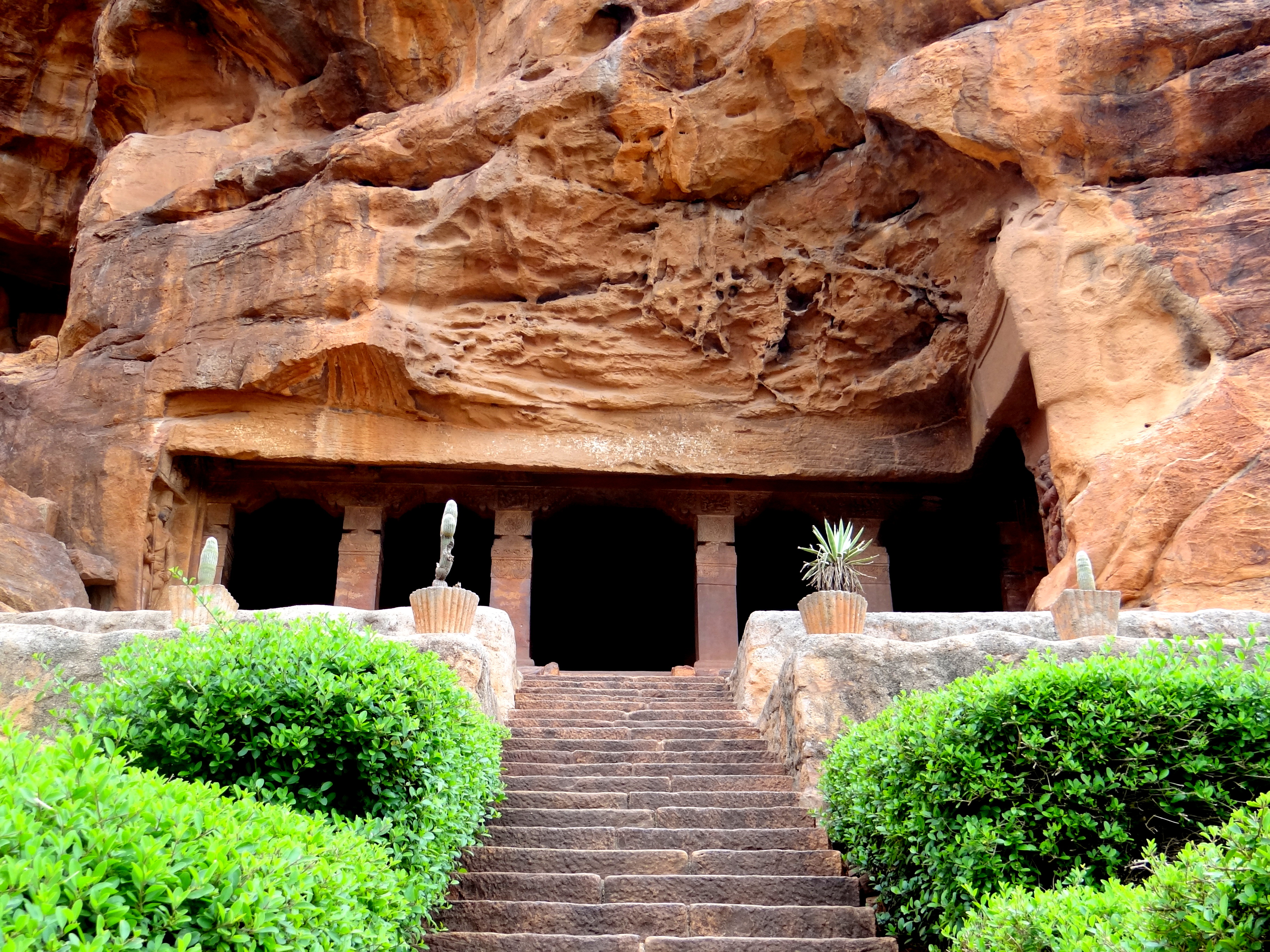
Entrance to Cave 1

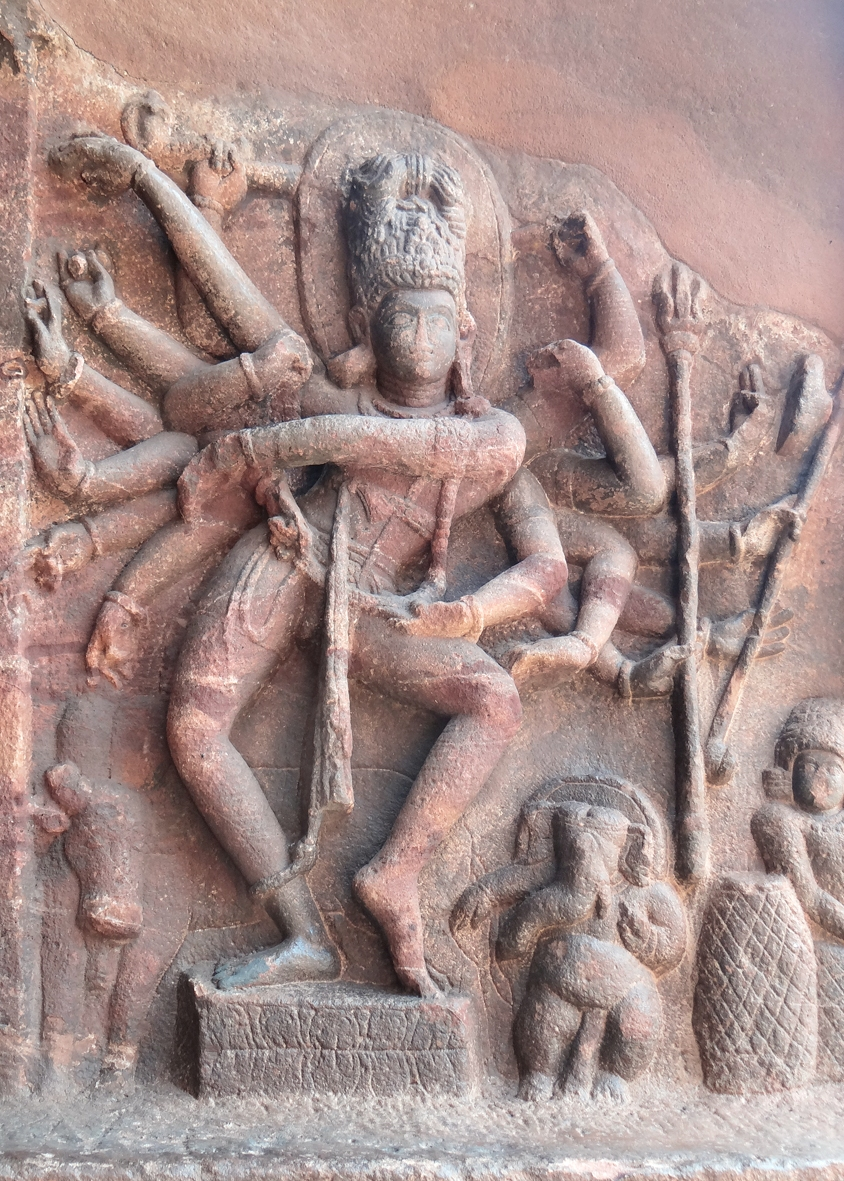
Nataraja or Dancing Shiva in Cave 1

Cave 1 is about 59 feet (18 m) above ground level on the north-west part of the hill. Access is through a series of steps that depict carvings of dwarfish ganas in different postures as if they hold the cave floor. The verandah, with an inner measurement of 70 feet (21 m) by 65 feet (20 m), has five columns sculpted with reliefs of flower garlands, foliage and jewelry.

Nataraja Carving

The cave portrays the Tandava-dancing Shiva as Nataraja on the rock face to the right of entrance and also part of Gandharveda. The image, 5 feet (1.5 m) tall, has 18 arms (9 in left and 9 on right) in a form that expresses the dance position (about 9x9=81 combinations in total) arranged in a geometric pattern, which Alice Boner – a Swiss art historian and Indologist, states is a time division symbolizing the cosmic wheel. The eighteen arms express Natya mudras (symbolic hand gestures), with some holding objects such as drums, a flame torch, a serpent, a trident and an axe. Shiva has his son Ganesha and the bull Nandi by his side. Adjoining the Nataraja, the wall depicts the goddess Durga of Shaktism tradition slaying the buffalo-demon Mahishasura. The sculptors had excellent knowledge of the natya mudras of Bharatanatya (a very popular classical dance in southern part of India), because there is no chance to correct any errors and it has to be perfectly carved at the first place otherwise the entire cave has to be abandoned.

Mahisasura Mardini Carving

On the right side of the Nataraja carving is a carving of Mahishasura mardini with Chaturbhuja (Chatur means 4, Bhuja means hands). The sculpture depicts the killing of the demon Mahishasura by Durga. Mahishasura was the son of Mahisi and great grandson of Bhahmarishi Kashyapa.

On the left of the entrance is a two-handed Shaiva dvarapala who holds a trident, and below him is a bull-elephant fused image where they share a head; seen from left it is an elephant and from right a bull.

Harihara Carving

Inside the veranda, the cave presents a carved sculpture of Harihara, a 7.75-foot (2.36 m) high sculpture of a fused image that is half-Shiva and half-Vishnu. He is flanked by the goddesses Parvati and Lakshmi on each side.

Ardhanareshwara Carving

To the right, toward the end of the wall, is a relief sculpture of Ardhanarishvara, a fused image of Shiva and his consort Parvati. One half of the image has Shiva with a moon on his mukuta (head), snakes in his hands, earrings and next to the half that represents Parvati is an attendant carrying a tray of jewels. Next to the Ardhanarishvara half that represents Shiva is Nandi the bull, and skeletal Bhringi, a devotee of Shiva. The Bhringi sadhu carvings shows the advance knowledge of anatomy for the whole body which includes the Skulls, Ribs, bones on hands and legs.

The carvings of Ardhanareshwara and Harihara were carefully built with a vision by the Chalukya kings delivering message to the Chalukya citizens about the equal rights for men and women in the society and need to mutually respect each other. There is no great male and no great female.

Inside this cave, the sons of Shiva, Ganesha and Kartikeya, the god of war and family deity of the Chalukya dynasty, are seen in one of the carved sculptures on the walls of the cave, with Kartikeya riding a peacock. The roof of the cave has five carved panels with the central panel depicting the Nagaraja, with flying couples on both sides. The head and bust are well formed and project from the centre of the coil. In another compartment a bas-relief 2.5 feet (0.76 m) in diameter has carvings of a male and female; the male is Yaksha carrying a sword and the female is Apsara with a flying veil. The succeeding panel has carvings of two small figures and the panel at the end is carved with lotuses.

All the figures are adorned with carved ornaments and surrounded by borders with reliefs of animals and birds. The lotus design is a common theme. On the ceiling are images of the Vidyadhara couples as well as couples in courtship and erotic Mithuna scenes. Through a cleft in the back wall of the cave is a square sanctuary with more carved images. In the mantapa is a seated Nandi facing the garbha ghruha (sacrum sanctum) containing a Shiva linga.

=== Cave 2 ===
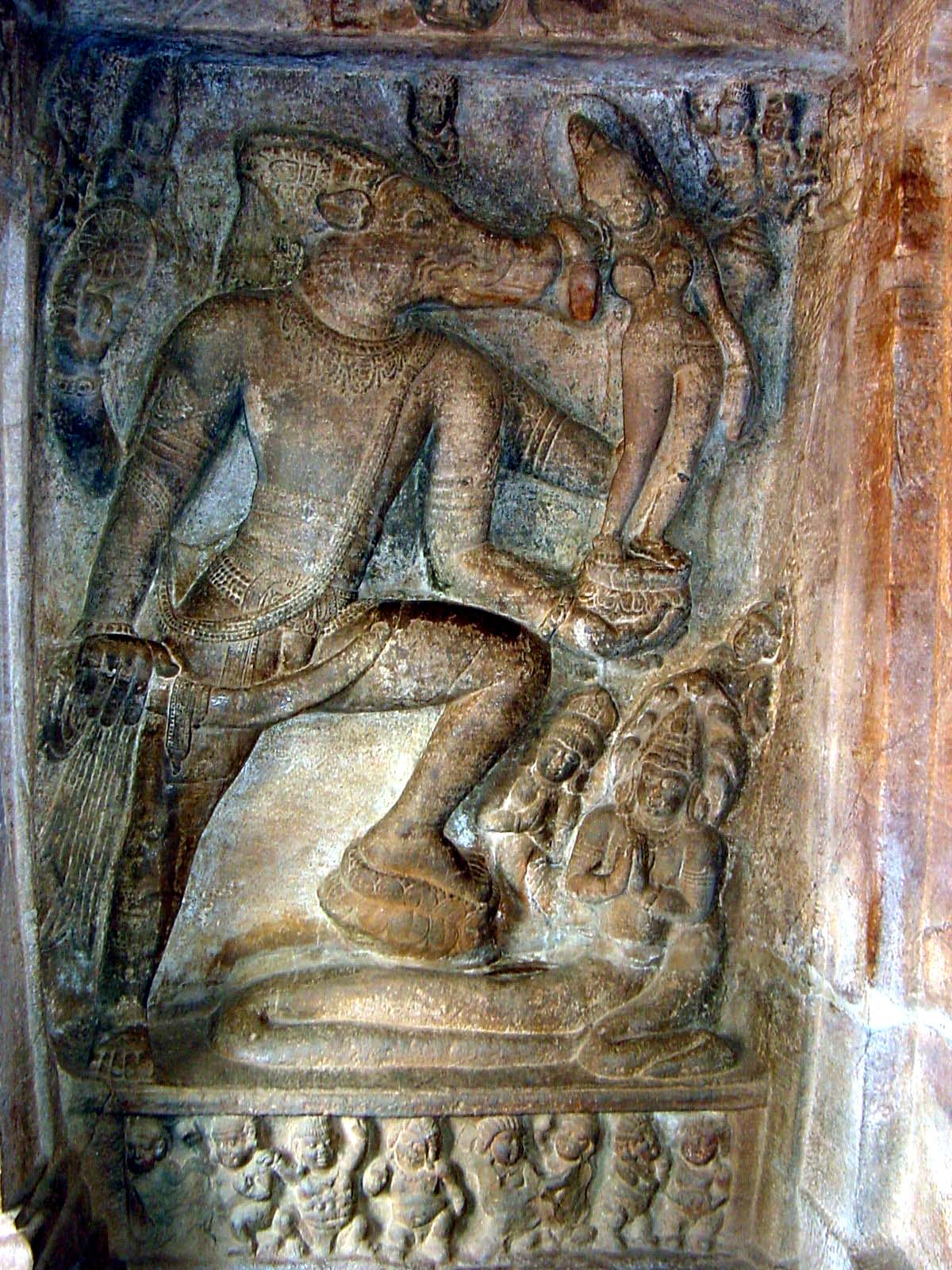
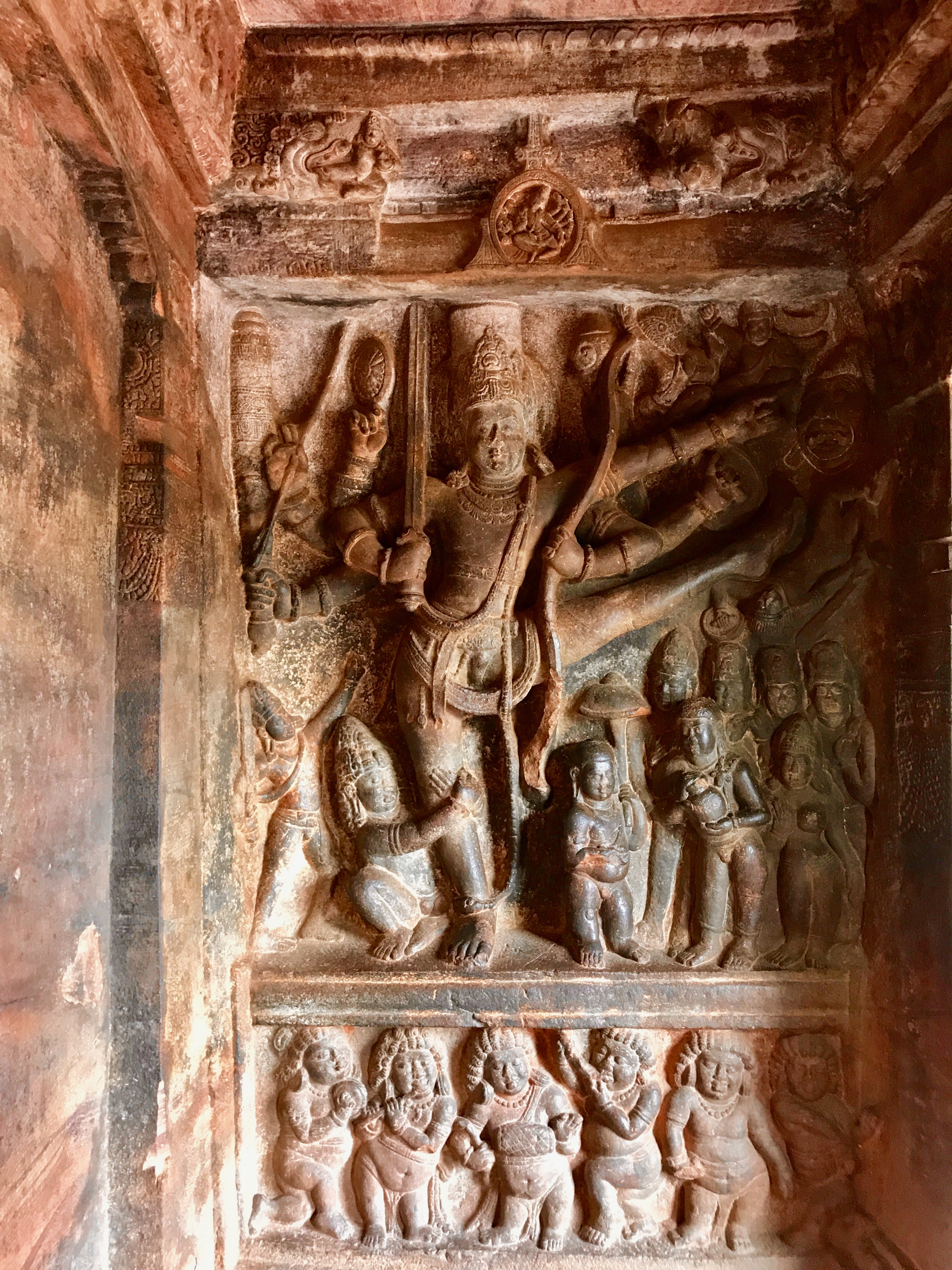
Left: Vishnu as Varaha rescuing Earth as Bhudevi. Right: Trivikrama stepping Vishnu, Vamana avatar legend and ancient Indian musical instruments carved below.

Cave 2 is above and to the east of Cave 1 and faces north. It was created in late 6th or early 7th century. It is smaller than Cave 1, somewhat similar in terms of its floor plan, but it is dedicated primarily to Vishnu. Cave 2 is reached by climbing 64 steps from the first cave. The cave entrance is a verandah divided by four square pillars with ends as half pillars, all carved out of the monolithic stone face. The pillars have decorative carvings with frieze of ganas (mythical dwarfs) with various facial expressions. On the two sides of the entrance are standing dvarapalas (guardians) holding flowers, not weapons. Like Cave 1, Cave 2 art reflects Hindu theology and arts.

The largest relief in Cave 2 depicts the legend of Vishnu in his Trivikrama form, taking one of the three steps. Below the raised step is a frieze showing the legend of Vamana dwarf avatar of Vishnu, before he morphs into the Trivikrama form. Another major relief shows the legend of Vishnu in his Varaha (a boar) avatar rescuing goddess earth (Bhudevi) from the depths of cosmic ocean, with a penitent multi-headed snake (Nāga) below. Like other major murti (statue) in this and other Badami caves, the Varaha artwork is set in a circle and symmetrically laid out; according to Alice Boner, the panel is an upright rectangle whose "height is equal to the octopartite directing circle and sides are aligned to essential geometric ratios, in this case to the second vertical chord of the circle". The walls and ceiling have traces of colored paint, suggesting the cave used to have fresco paintings.

Inside the temple are friezes showing stories from Hindu texts such as the Bhagavata Purana. These show the legend of cosmic ocean churning (Samudra Manthan) and Krishna's birth and flute playing indicating the theological and cultural significance of these in 7th century India. The ceiling and door head carvings show Gajalakshmi, the swastika symbols, flying couples, Brahma, Vishnu asleep on Shesha and others.

The ceiling of Cave 2 shows a wheel with sixteen fish spokes in a square frame. The end bays have a flying couple and Vishnu on Garuda. The main hall in the cave is 33.33 feet (10.16 m) wide, 23.583 feet (7.188 m) deep, and 11.33 feet (3.45 m) high and is supported by eight square pillars in two rows. The roof of this hall has panels filled with bas-relief carvings. The sculptures of Cave 2, like Cave 1, are of the northern Deccan style of the 6th and 7th century similar to that found in Ellora Caves.

=== Cave 3 ===
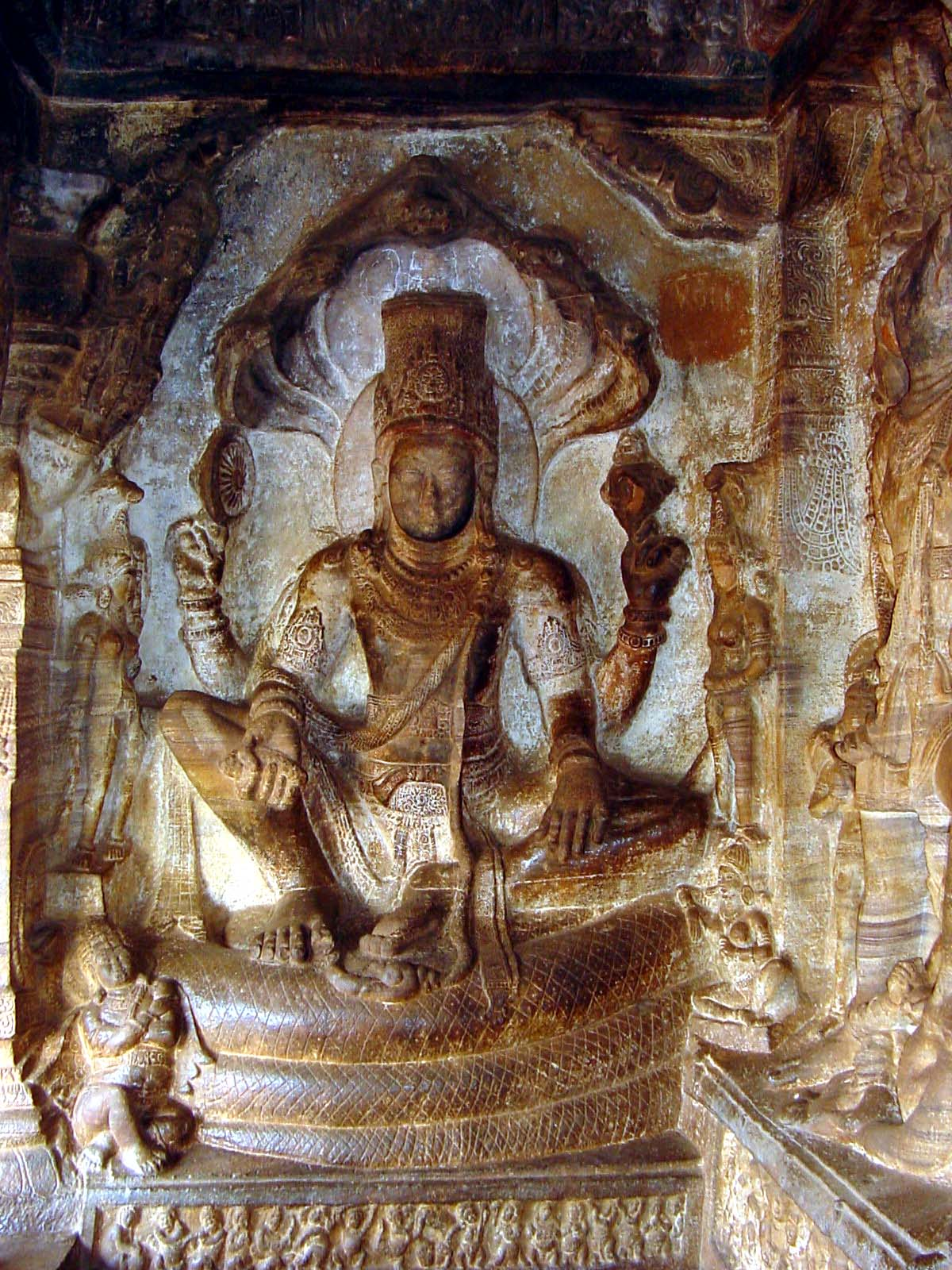
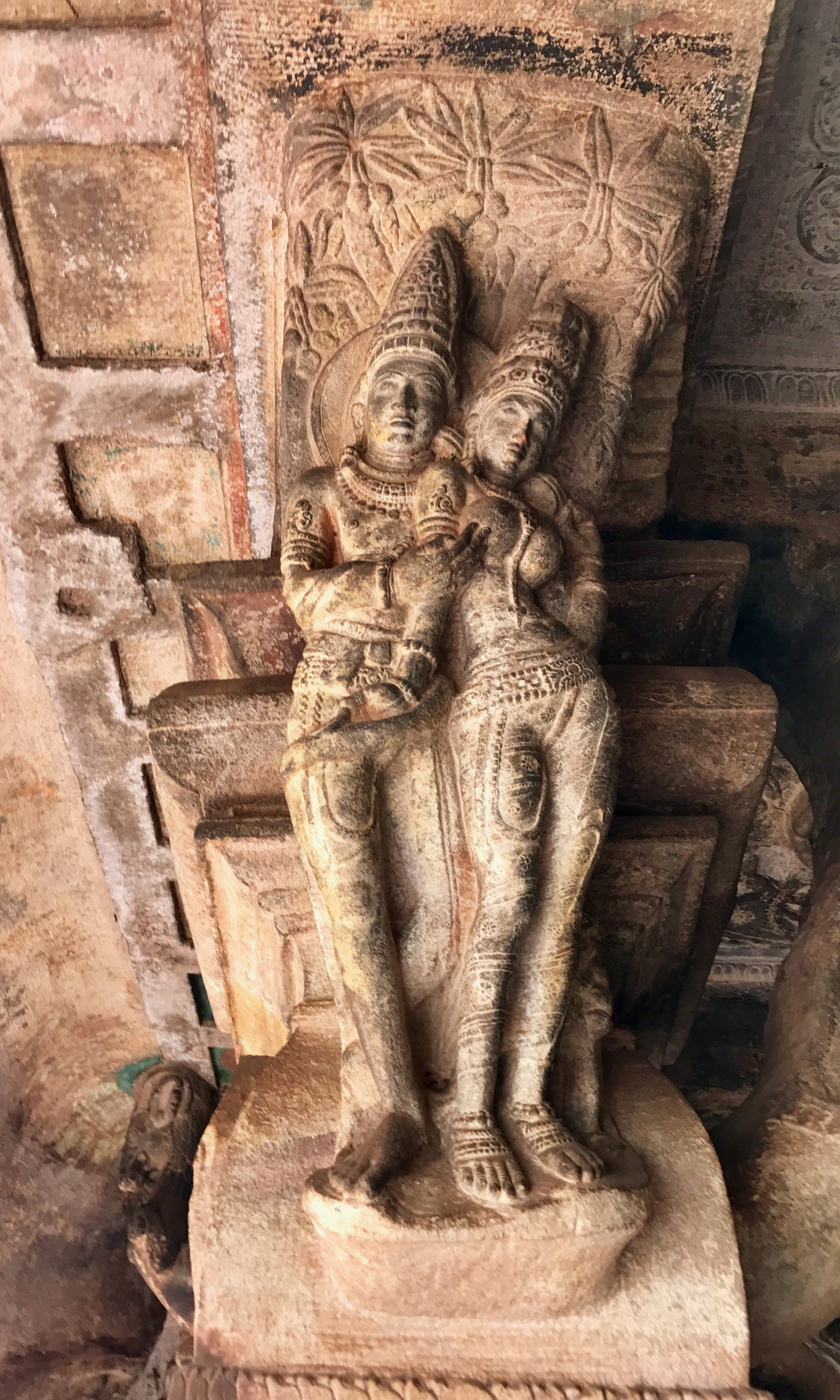
Left: Vishnu seated on serpent Sesha in Cave 3; Right: An amorous couple

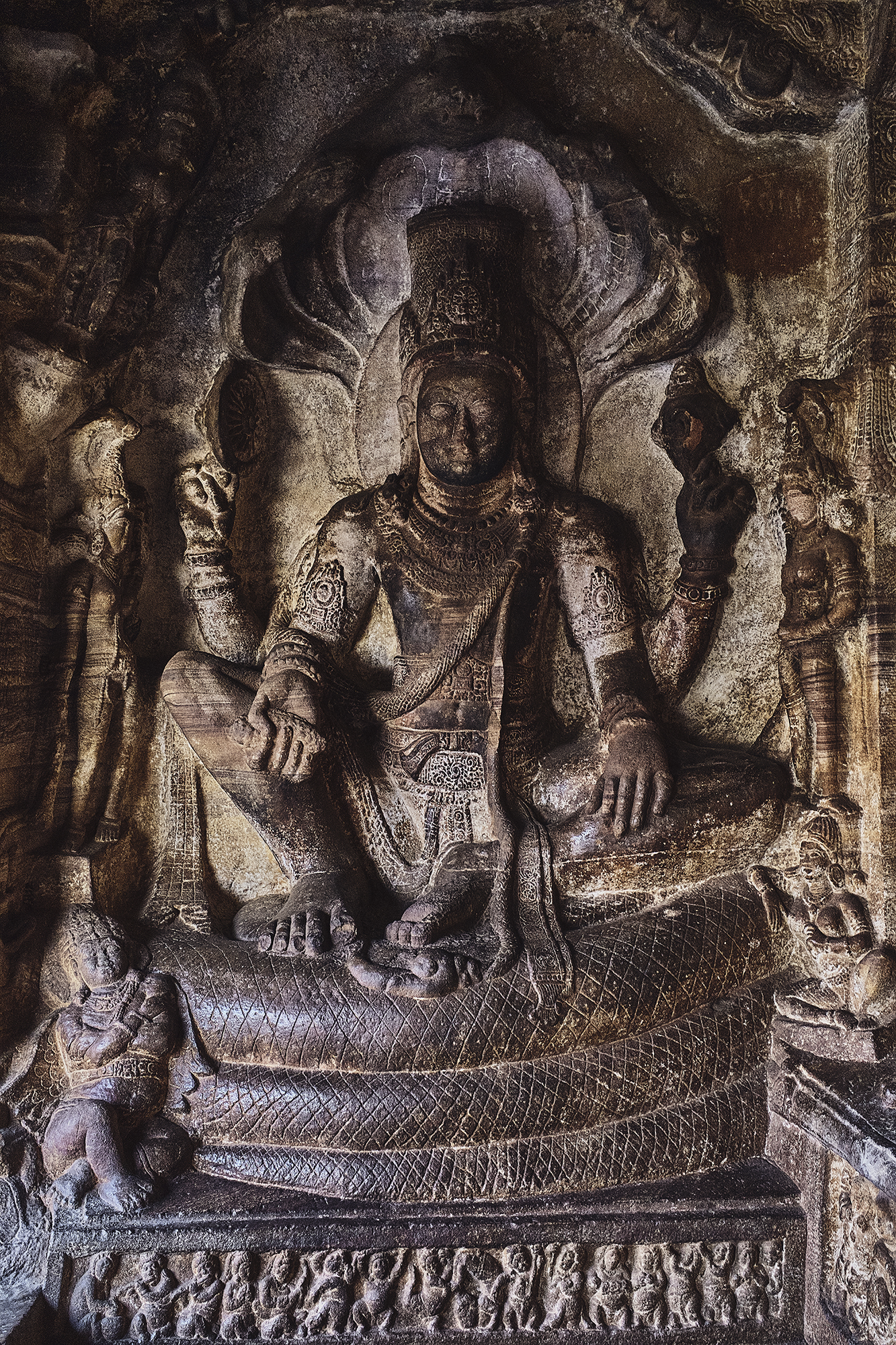

Cave 3 is earliest dated Hindu temple in the Deccan region. It is dedicated to Vishnu; it is the largest cave in the complex. It has intricately carved friezes and giant figures of Trivikrama, Anantasayana, Vasudeva, Varaha, Harihara and Narasimha. Cave 3's primary theme is Vaishnavite, though it also shows Harihara on its southern wall – half Vishnu and half Shiva shown fused as one, making the cave important to Shaivism studies.

Facing north, Cave 3 is 60 steps from Cave 2 at a higher level. Cave 3's verandah is 70 feet (21 m) in length with an interior width of 65 feet (20 m); it has been sculpted 48 feet (15 m) deep into the mountain; an added square shrine at the end extends the cave 12 feet (3.7 m) further inside. The verandah itself is 7 feet (2.1 m) wide and has four free-standing, carved pillars separating it from the hall. The cave is 15 feet (4.6 m) high; it is supported by six pillars, each measuring 2.5 square feet (0.23 m^{2}). Each column and pilaster is carved with wide, deep bases crowned with capitals that are partly hidden by brackets on three sides. Each bracket, except for one, has carvings of human figures standing under foliage in different postures, of male and female mythological characters, and an attendant figure of a dwarf. A moulded cornice in the facia, with a dado of blocks below it (generally 7 feet (2.1 m) long), has about thirty compartments carved with two dwarves called ganas.

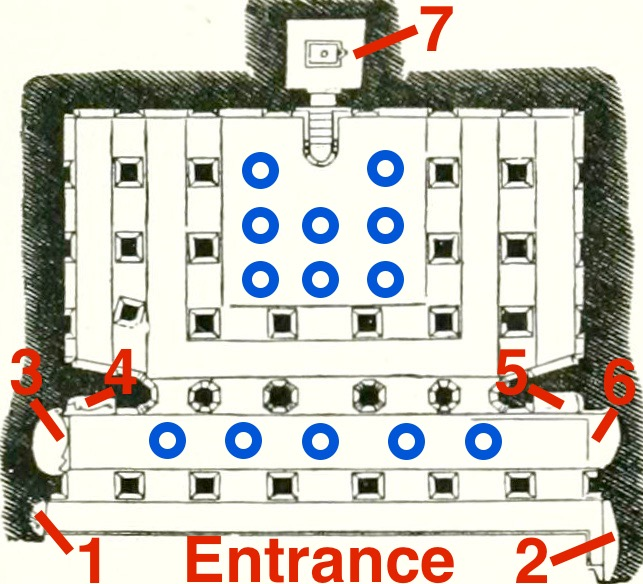
Layout of Cave 3 temple; 1: Vishnu; 2: Trivikrama; 3: Vishnu on sesha; 4: Vishnu avatar Varaha rescuing earth; 5: Harihara (half Shiva, half Vishnu); 6: Vishnu avatar Narasimha standing; 7: Garbha ghriya (sacrum sanctum); Blue O: ceiling carvings of Vedic and Puranic Hindu gods and goddesses.

Cave 3 also shows fresco paintings on the ceiling, some of which are faded and broken. These are among the earliest known surviving evidence of fresco painting in Indian art. The Hindu god Brahma is seen on Hamsa vahana in one of the murals. The wedding of Shiva and Parvati, attended by various Hindu deities is the theme of another.

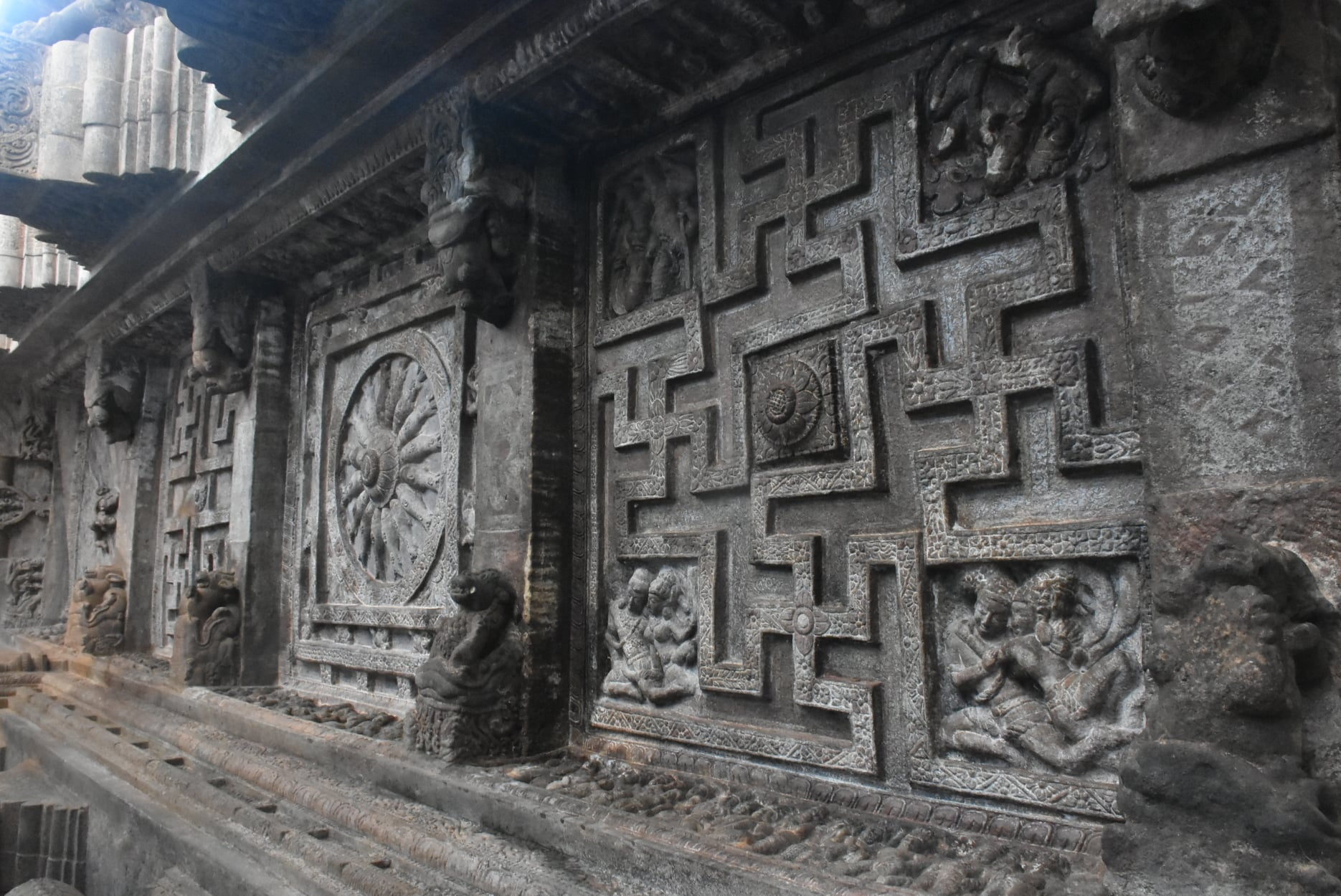
Ceiling in the Cave-3 with images of Swasthika on two ends with a Matsya avatara of Vishnu in the middle

There is a lotus medallion on the floor underneath the ceiling mural of Brahma. The ceiling has reliefs of many Vedic gods and goddesses such as Agni, Indra and Varuna. The cave artworks, in some cases, show the artists signatures, as well as a major inscription. This and other epigraphical evidence suggests that the cave temple was inaugurated on the "full moon day, 1 November 578". The roof of the verandah has seven panels created by cross beams; each is painted in circular compartments with images of deities including Shiva, Vishnu, Indra, Brahma and Kama, with smaller images of Dikpalas (cardinal guardians) at the corners.

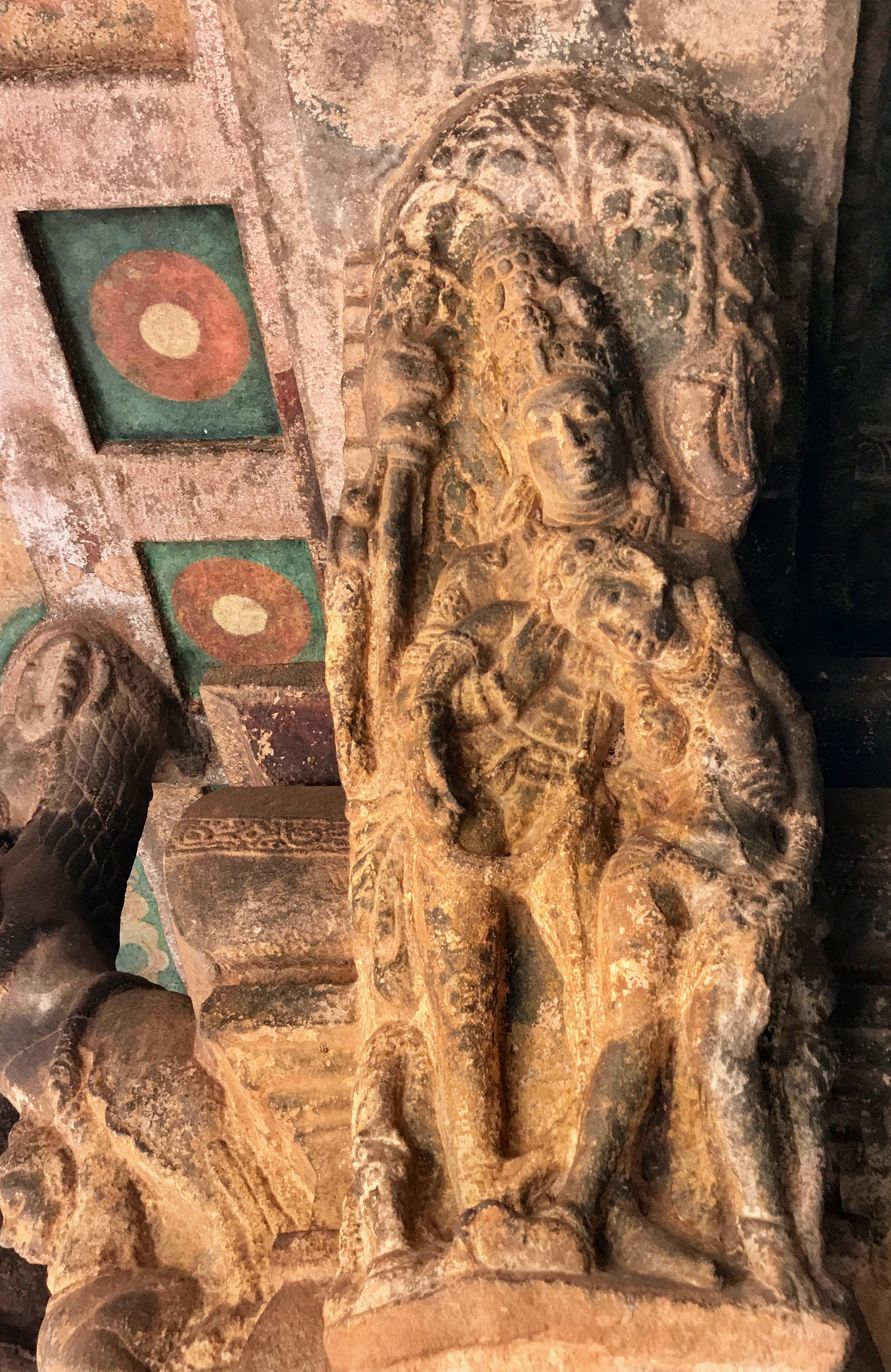
Artwork shows a collapsing sorrowful woman being helped.

The roof of the front aisle has panels with murals in the centre of male and female figurines flying in the clouds; the male figure is yaksha holding a sword and a shield. Decoration of lotus blooms are also seen on the panels. The roof of the hall is divided into nine panels slightly above the level of the ceiling. The central panel here depicts a deva mounted on a ram – conjectured to be Agni. Images of Brahma and Varuna are also painted on the central panels; the floating figures are seen in the remaining panels.

The sculpture in Cave 3 is well preserved. Vishnu is presented in various avatars and forms, such as a standing Vishnu with eight arms; Vishnu seated on the hooded serpent Shesha on the eastern side of the veranda; Vishnu as standing Narasimha (man-lion avatar); Vishnu as Varaha (man-boar avatar) rescuing earth; Harihara (half Shiva, half Vishnu and their equivalence); and Trivikrama-Vamana avatars. The back wall has carvings of Vidhyadharas. The cave shows many Kama scenes in pillar brackets, where a woman and a man are in courtship or mithuna (erotic) embrace.

Aspects of the culture, cosmetics and clothing in the 6th century is visible in the art sculpted in this cave, showing a sophisticated tradition.

=== Cave 4 ===
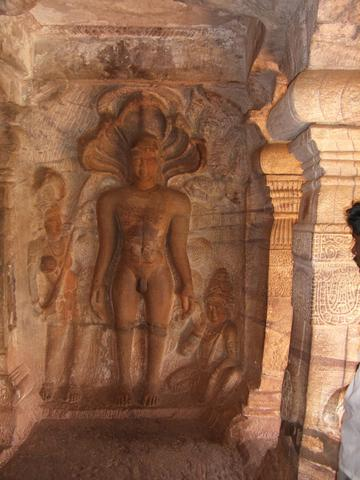
Tirthankara Parshvanatha

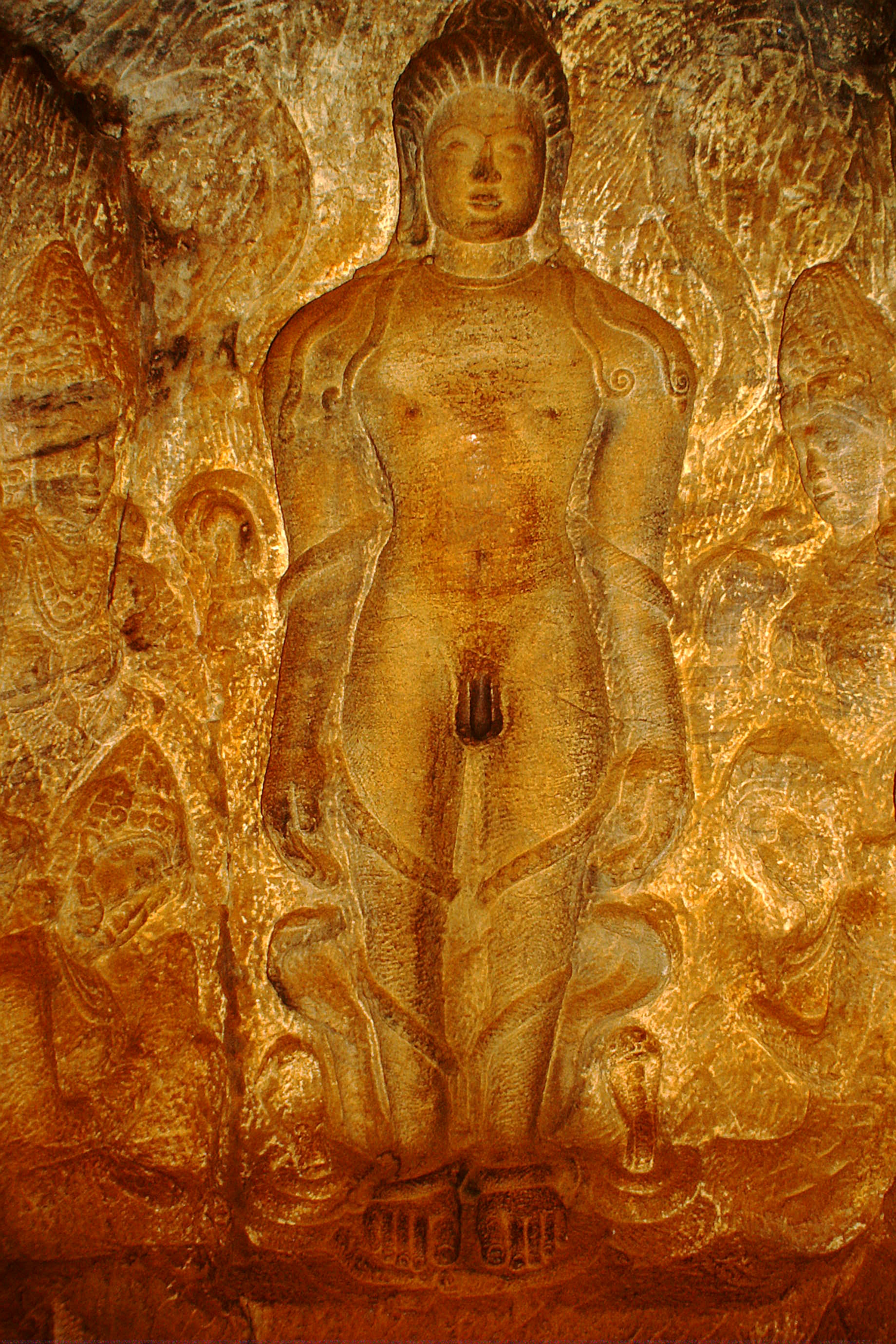
Bahubali in Jain Cave 4

Located immediately next to and east of Cave 3, Cave 4 floor is situated about 10 feet lower and is the smallest of the four. It is dedicated to Tirthankaras, the revered figures of Jainism. It was constructed after the first three, sponsored by Hindu kings in later part of the 7th-century. Some scholars state this cave may have been created in the 8th century. Some embellishments were likely added in later centuries until about the 11th or 12th century.

Like the other caves, Cave 4 features detailed carvings and a diverse range of motifs. The cave has a five-bayed entrance with four square columns – each with brackets and capitals. To the back of this verandah is a hall with two standalone and two joined pillars. The first aisle is a verandah 31 feet (9.4 m) long by 6.5 feet (2.0 m) wide, extending to 16 feet (4.9 m) deep. From the hall, steps lead to the sanctum sanctorum, which is 25.5 feet (7.8 m) wide extends to a depth of 6 feet (1.8 m).

Inside the cave are major carvings of Bahubali, Parshvanatha and Mahavira with symbolic display of other Tirthankaras. Bahubali is standing in Kayotsarga meditating posture with vines wrapped around his leg, his classic iconography. Parshvanatha is shown with the five-headed cobra hood. Mahavira is represented sitting on a lion throne, whose identifying markers are not visibly and is identified by some scholars simply as a "seated Jina". This figure is flanked by bas-reliefs of attendants with chauri (fans), sardulas and makara's heads. Other carvings include Indrabhuti Gautama covered by four snakes, Brahmi and Sundari. In the sanctum is an image of Mahavira resting on a pedestal containing a 12th-century Kannada inscription marking the death of one Jakkave. Twenty-four small Jaina Tirthankara images are engraved on the inner pillars and walls. In addition there are idols of Yakshas, Yakshis and Padmavati.

The artistic work, the icons to represents ideas and the motifs in Badami Cave 4, states Lisa Owens, resembles those of nearby Aihole Jain caves and much farther north Ellora Caves Jain caves in northern Maharashtra.

=== Other caves ===
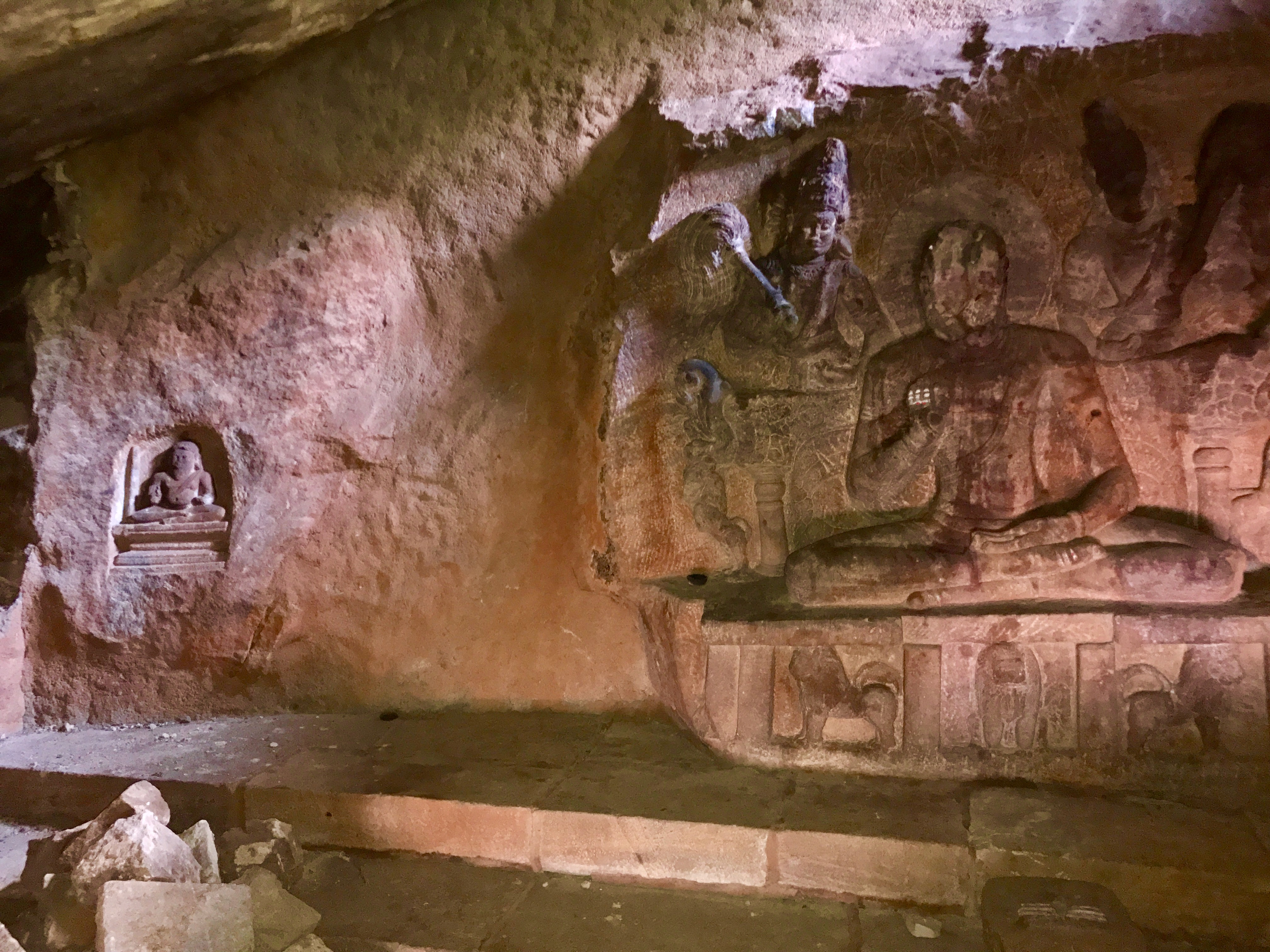
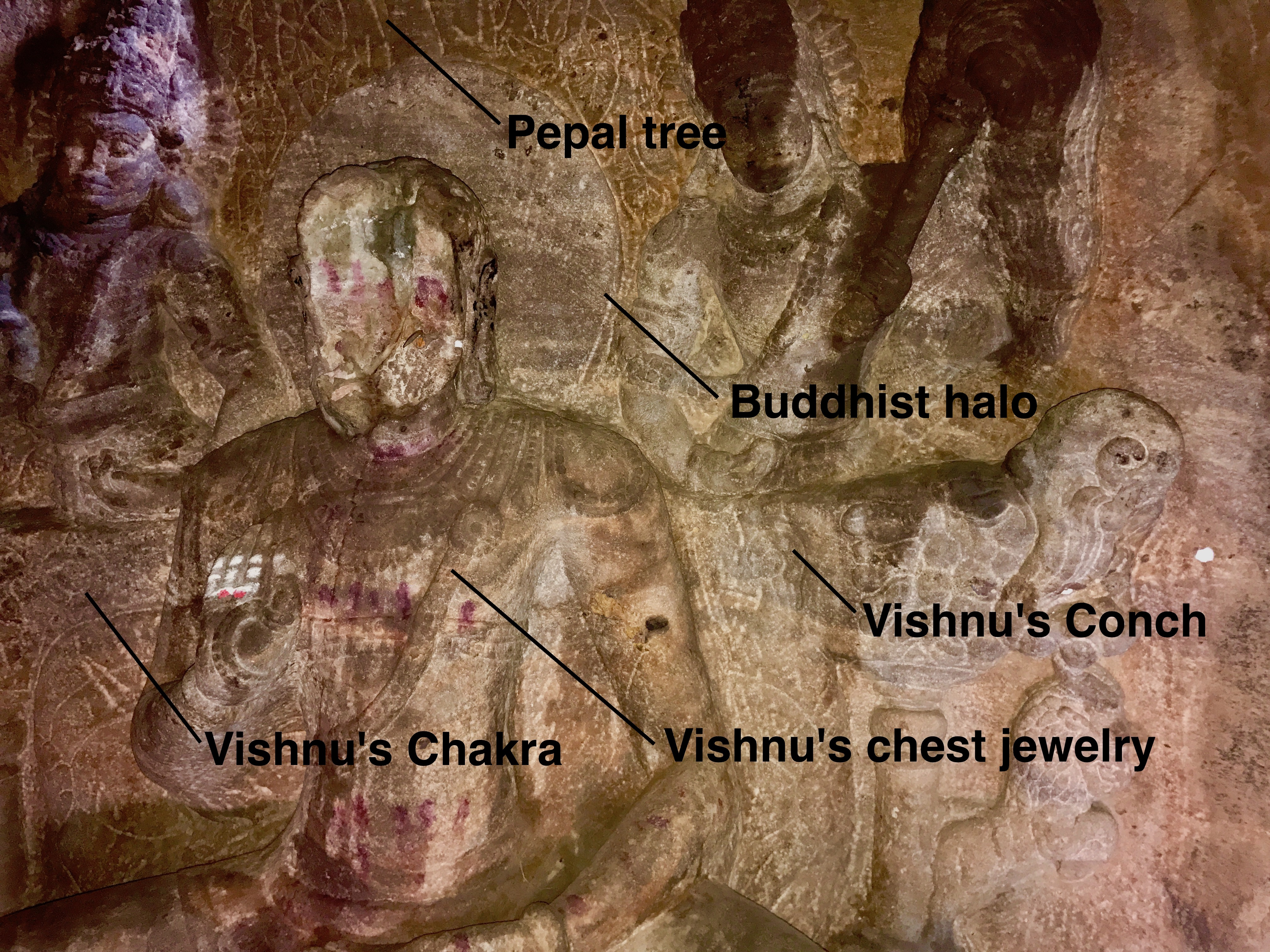
Left: The controversial cave along the Agastya lake on the opposite side of the four numbered caves; Right: Vaishnava iconography.

Other than the numbered caves, Badami is home to many other cave monuments and medieval era temples. On the other side of the lake, near the Bhutanatha temple, is a 7th-8th century Chalukya period cave of small dimensions. Inside, there is a carved statue seated over a sculpted throne with reliefs showing people holding chauris (fans), a Pipal tree, elephants, and lions in an attacking pose. On one side of the statue is a chakra, on the other a conch shell. The statue wears abundant jewelry and a thread over its chest. The face of this statue is damaged and missing its face.

There are several theories as to who the statue represents. One theory holds that it is a relief of the Buddha in a sitting posture. This is supported by two chauri bearers who may be Bodhisattvas flanking the Buddha. According to George Michell, the halo, the Pipal tree, and cloak-like dress suggests that this was originally a Buddha statue. According to B.V. Shetti – archaeologist and curator of Prince of Wales Museum of Western India, the cave was not converted but from the start represented a tribute to Mayamoha of the Hindu Puranas, or Buddhavatara Vishnu (ninth avatar of Vishnu). This theory is supported by the chakra, conch and jewelry included in its iconography. The style suggests it was likely carved in or before the 8th century.

Another theory found in colonial-era texts such as one by John Murray – a missionary in British India and Jainism scholar, states the main image carved in Cave 5 is that of a Jaina figure. According to a third theory, by Henry Cousens and A. Sundara – archaeologists, and supported by local legends, the statue is of an ancient king; in a photograph of the statue taken before its face was damaged, the figure lacked the Ushnisha lump that typically goes with Buddha's image. The statue has several unusual, non-Buddha ornaments such as rings for fingers, a necklace, and a chest-band; it wears a Hindu Yajnopavita thread and its head is stylistically closer to a Jina head than a Buddha's head. These features suggest the statue may be of a king represented with features of various traditions. According to Carol Radcliffe Bolon – Assistant Curator at the Smithsonian Freer Gallery of Art, the date and identity of the main statue in Cave 5 remains enigmatic.

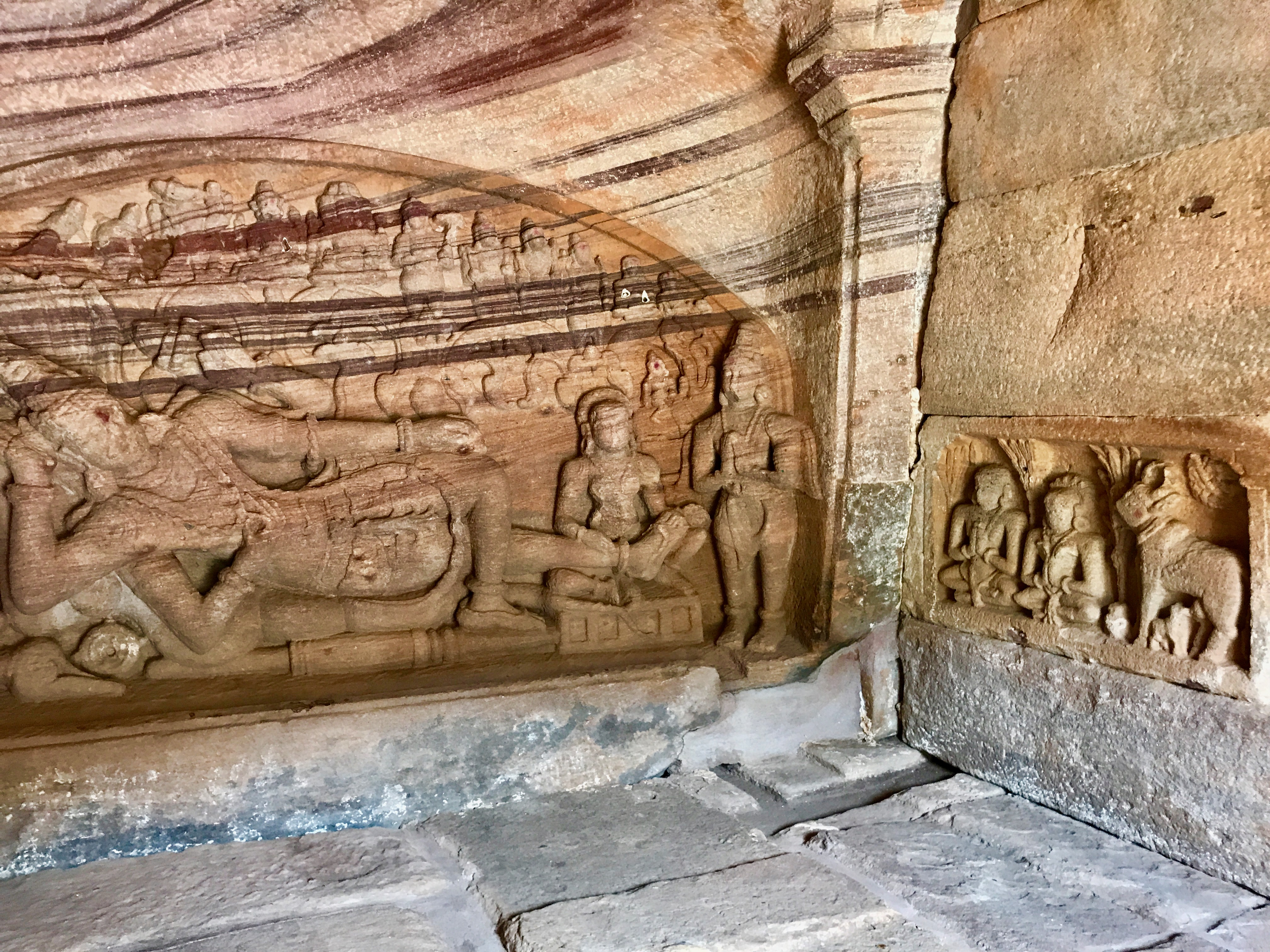
A small cave rock carving of Anantashayana Vishnu.

Close to the controversial cave are other monuments. One of them is a small shrine consisting of a 7th-century rock carving of Anantashayana Vishnu, or reclining Vishnu with Lakshmi and Garuda in namaste posture. Vishnu is shown restarting the cosmic cycle by giving birth to all of existence. Above the reclining carved relief are the ten avatars of Vishnu – Matsya, Kurma, Varaha, Narasimha, Vamana, Parashurama, Rama, Krishna, Buddha, and Kalki. Between the Narasimha and Vamana is shown relief of Brahma cord connected to Vishnu's navel. To the left of the relief is depicted the Trinity – Vishnu, Shiva, and Brahma, while to the right is a human couple and a mother cow with a calf feeding.

In 2013, Manjunath Sullolli – Assistant Director of Bagalkot district working for the state government of Karnataka, reported the discovery of another cave with 27 rock carvings, about 500 metres (1,600 ft) from the four main caves. Water gushes from this newly discovered cave year round. It depicts Vishnu and other Hindu deities, and features an inscription in the Devanagari script. The dating of these carvings is unknown.

== Prehistoric Rock Paintings ==
Next to Badami caves Main complex, near Shri Gudde Ranganathaswami Temple, Prehistoric Rock Paintings in Ochre can be seen. They are also called Hiregudda Rock Paintings based on the name of these Hills. Drawings consist of Human figurines which are very tall, animals like Wild Boar, Bulls, rabits etc. along with figures of warriors, unidentified humanoids etc.

== In popular culture ==
Many scenes from web series 'The secret of the Shiledars' were shot at Badami caves complex.

== See also ==
- Aihole
- Badami Chalukya Architecture
- Indian rock-cut architecture
- Ellora Caves
- Kanheri Caves
- Kappe Arabhatta
- Karla Caves
- List of colossal sculptures in situ
- List of India cave temples
- Mahakuta group of temples
- Nellitheertha Cave Temple
- Pattadakal
- Pandavleni Caves
- Sirpur Group of Monuments
- Undavalli caves
- Varaha Cave Temple
