= Harihara =

Fused Hindu deity of Vishnu (Hari) and Shiva (Hara)

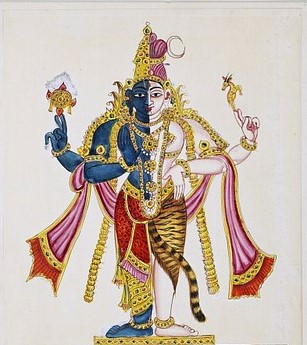
- Painting of Harihara, circa 1825.
- Other names: Shankaranarayana

Harihara (Sanskrit: हरिहर) is the dual representation of the Hindu deities Vishnu (Hari) and Shiva (Hara). Harihara is also known as Shankaranarayana ("Shankara" is Shiva, and "Narayana" is Vishnu).

Harihara is also sometimes used as a philosophical term to denote the unity of Vishnu and Shiva as different aspects of the same Ultimate Reality, known as Brahman. This concept of equivalence of various gods as one principle and "oneness of all existence" is discussed as Harihara in the texts of Advaita Vedanta and in some schools of Shaivism such as Virashaiva of Hindu philosophy.

Some of the earliest sculptures of Harihara, with one half of the image as Vishnu and other half as Shiva, are found in the surviving cave temples of India, such as in the cave 1 and cave 3 of the 6th-century Badami cave temples.

== Concept ==
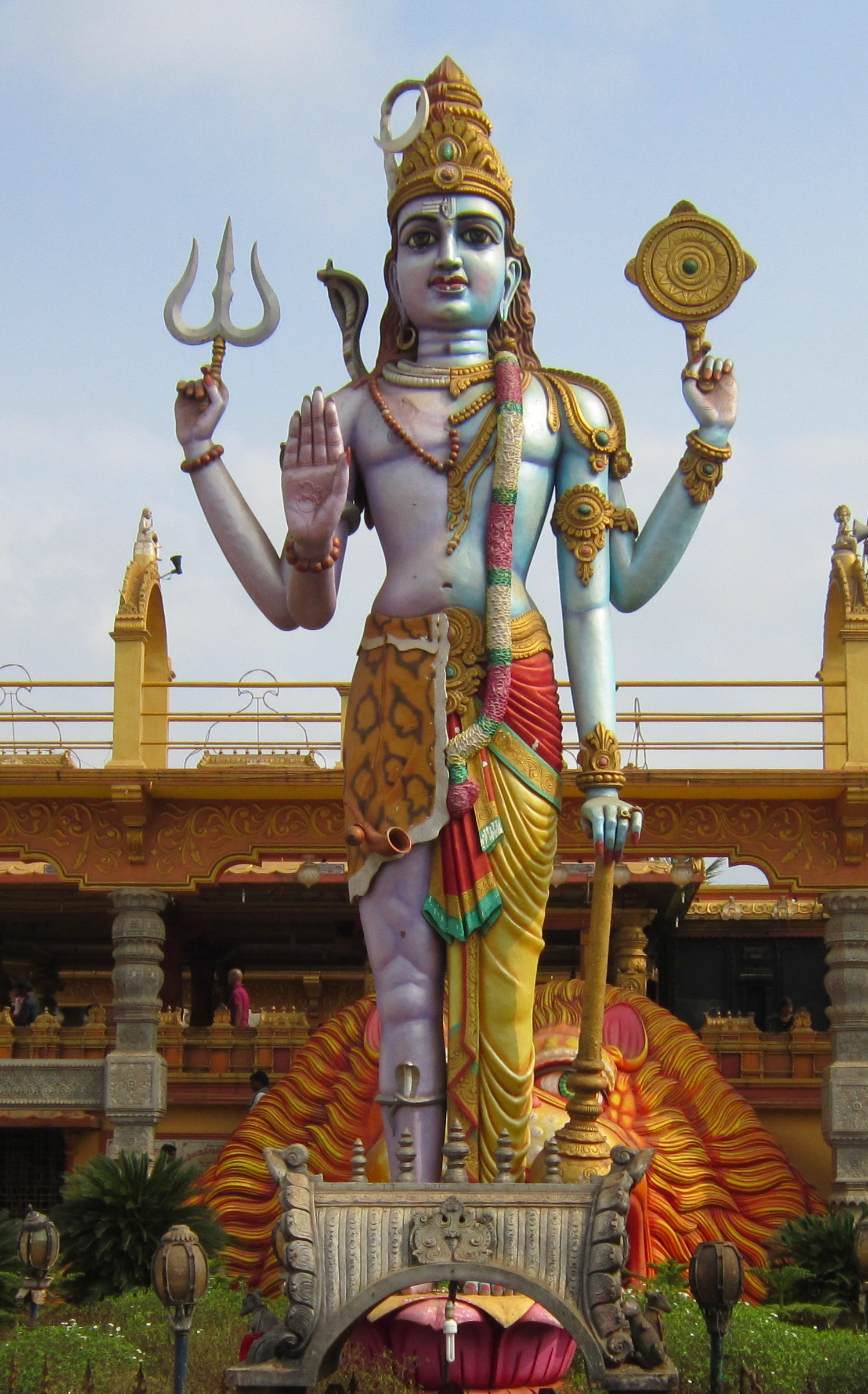
Vishnu (right, holding the discus Sudarshana Chakra) and Shiva (left, holding the trident Trishula) as Harihara. This form is also referred to as Shivakeshava and Haryadhamurti.

The diversity within Hinduism encourages a wide variety of beliefs and traditions, of which two important and large traditions are associated with Vishnu and Shiva. Some schools focus on Vishnu (including his associated avatars such as Rama and Krishna) as the Supreme God, and others on Shiva (including his different avatars such as Mahadeva and Pashupata). The Puranas and various Hindu traditions treat both Shiva and Vishnu as being different aspects of the one Brahman. Harihara is a symbolic representation of this idea. A similar idea, called Ardhanarishvara or Naranari, fuses masculine and feminine deities as one and equivalent representation in Hinduism.

Depending on which scriptures (and translations) are quoted, evidence is available to support each of the different arguments. In most cases, even if one personality is taken as being superior over the other, much respect is still offered to both Vishnu and Shiva by the other's worshippers (i.e. Vishnu is still regarded as being above the level of an ordinary jiva and 'the greatest of the Pashupata' by Shaivas who worship only Shiva).

Swaminarayan holds that Vishnu and Shiva are different aspects of the same God.

== Legends ==
The earliest mention of Harihara is likely to be observed in the Vishnu Parva of the Harivamsha, where Markandeya discusses the being.

According to one legend, when Vishnu appeared as the enchantress Mohini in front of Shiva, the latter grew besotted with her and attempted to embrace her. At this moment, Mohini reverted to the true form of Vishnu, at which point the two deities fused as one being, Harihara.

According to the Skanda Purana, the devotees of Shiva engaged in a dispute with Vishnu's devotees regarding the supremacy of their deities. To end this issue, Shiva and Vishnu merged into one being, Harihara.

== Depictions ==
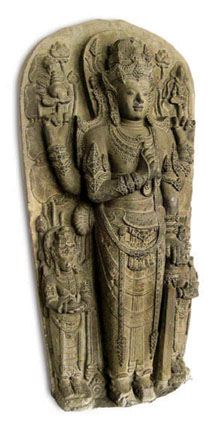
Statue of Harihara. This statue is the mortuary deified portrayal of King Kertarajasa, the first king of Majapahit (1293–1309) from the temple Candi Simping in East Java.

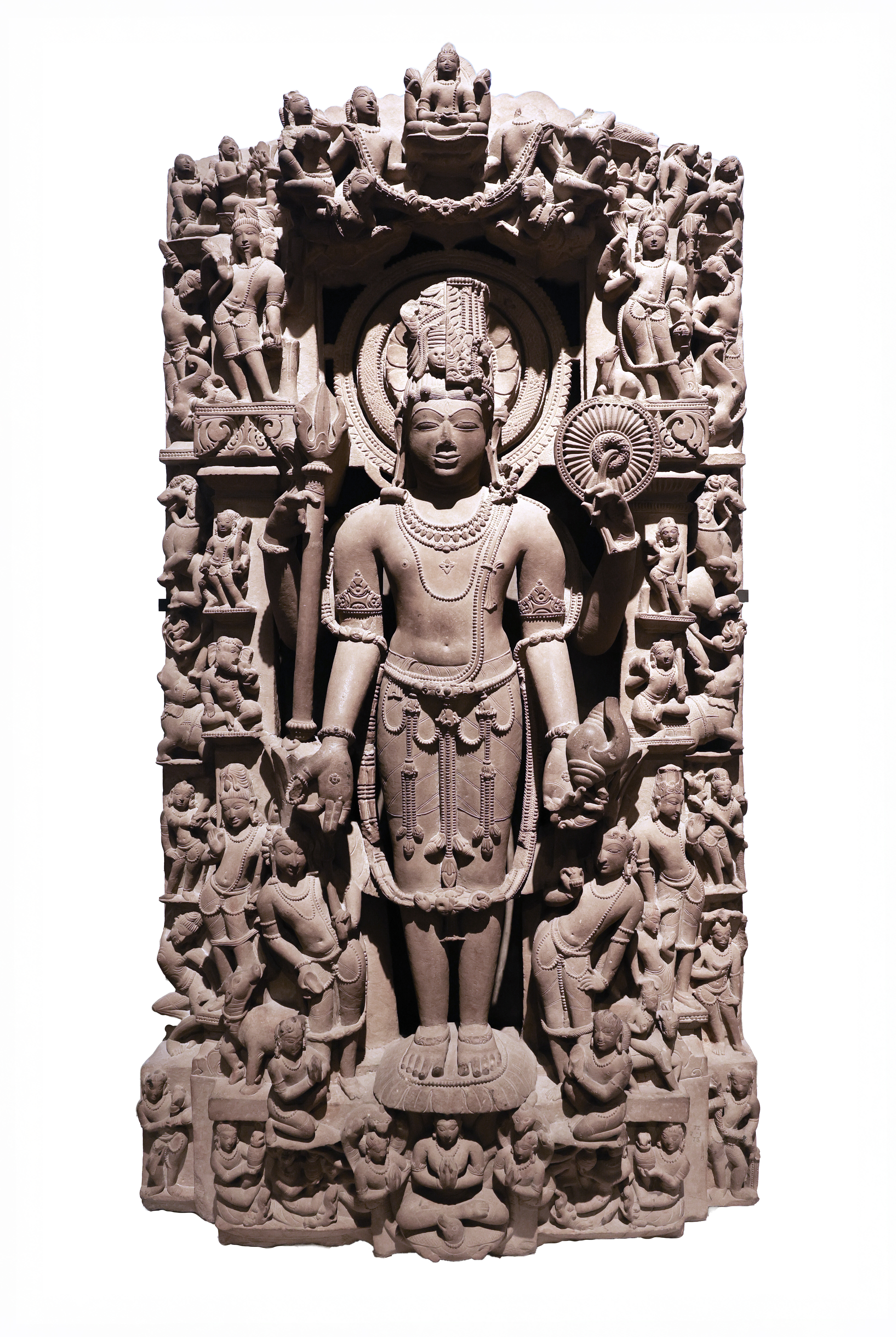
Harihara sculpture, British Museum. The left half represents Shiva (with the Trishula) and the right half represents Vishnu (with the Chakra and Conch).

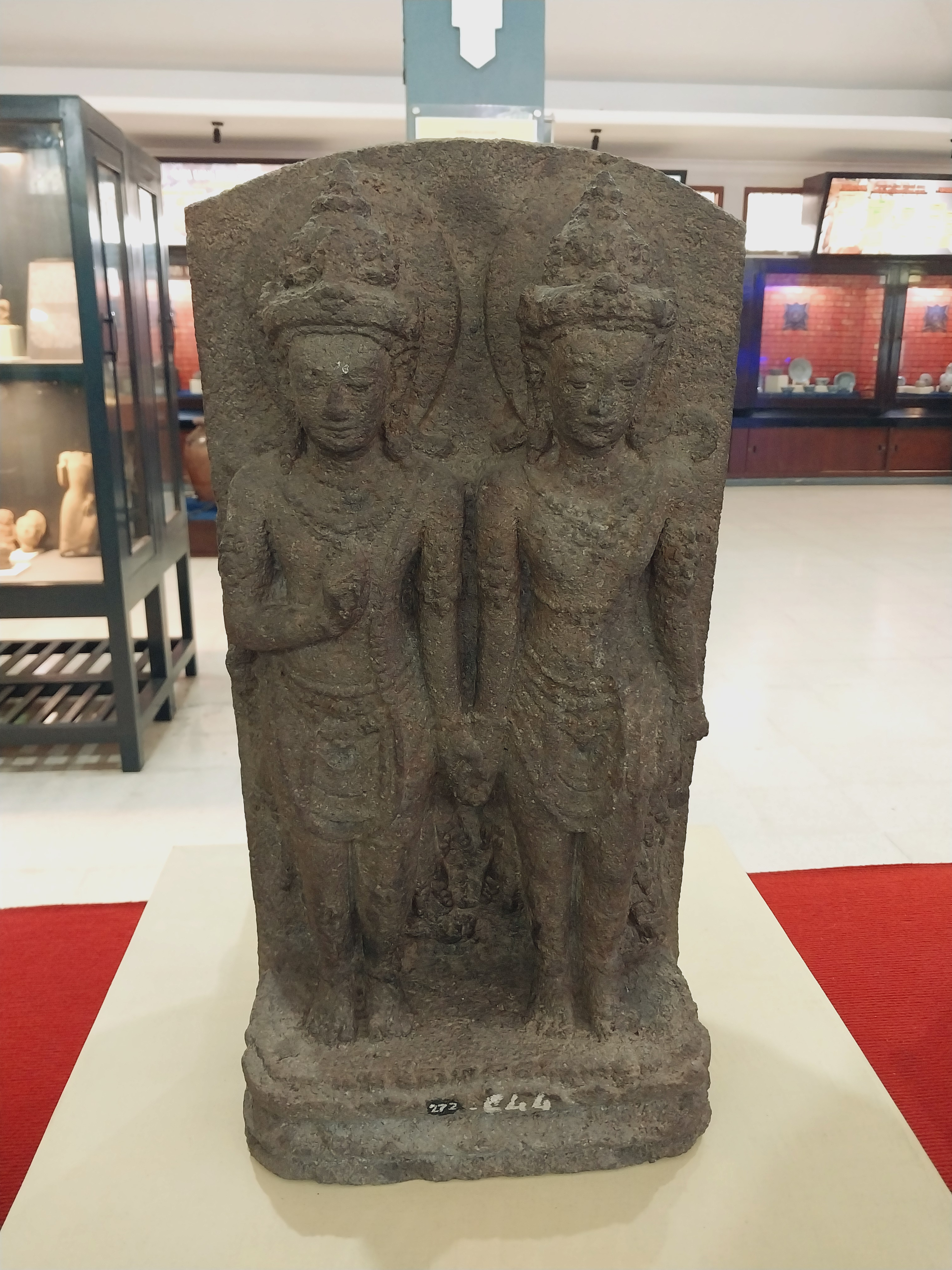
Statue of Harihara in the Museum of Trowulan in Indonesia. This statue portrays two identical figures.

Harihara is depicted in art as split down the middle, one half representing Shiva, the other half representing Vishnu. The Shiva half will have the matted locks of a yogic master piled high on his head and sometimes will wear a tiger skin, reserved for the most revered ascetics. Shiva's pale skin may be read as ash-covered in his role as an ascetic. The Vishnu half will wear a tall crown and other jewelry, representing his responsibility for maintaining world order. Vishnu's black skin represents holiness. Broadly, these distinctions serve to represent the duality of humble religious influence in the ascetic and authoritative secular power in the king or householder. However, in other aspects Shiva also takes on the authoritative position of householder, a position which is directly at odds with the ascetic position depicted in his Harihara manifestation.

Harihara has been part of temple iconography throughout South Asia and Southeast Asia, with some illustrations listed in the following table. In some states, the concept of Harihara appears through alternate names and its progeny.

Temples with Harihara murti (half Vishnu, half Shiva)
Temple name	Location	Harihara murti date	Reference
Badami cave temples	Karnataka	6th century	
Dharmaraja Ratha	Tamil Nadu	7th century	
Sri Ranganatha Perumal temple, Namakkal	Tamil Nadu	6th to 8th century	
Birasini temple	Madhya Pradesh		
Harihareshwara Temple	Karnataka	13th century	
Ossian temples	Rajasthan	two from 8th century, one 9th century	
Deopani temple	Assam	two from 9th, 10th century	
Mukteshvara Temple	Odisha	9th-10th Century CE	
Saugal-tol temple	Nepal	statue: 6th century temple: 12th to 16th century	
Purandi temple	Nepal	11th century	
Prasat Andet	Cambodia	late 7th to early 8th century	
Phnom Da	Cambodia	7th century	
Candi Simping	Indonesia	13th or 14th century	
Baijnath Temple	Himachal Pradesh	13th century	
Hariharnath Temple	Bihar	Exact dates not known.	Sonpur, Bihar

== See also ==
- Ardhanarishvara
- Vaikuntha Kamalaja
- Harishankari
