= Ardhanarishvara =

Composite form of the Hindu deities Shiva and Parvati

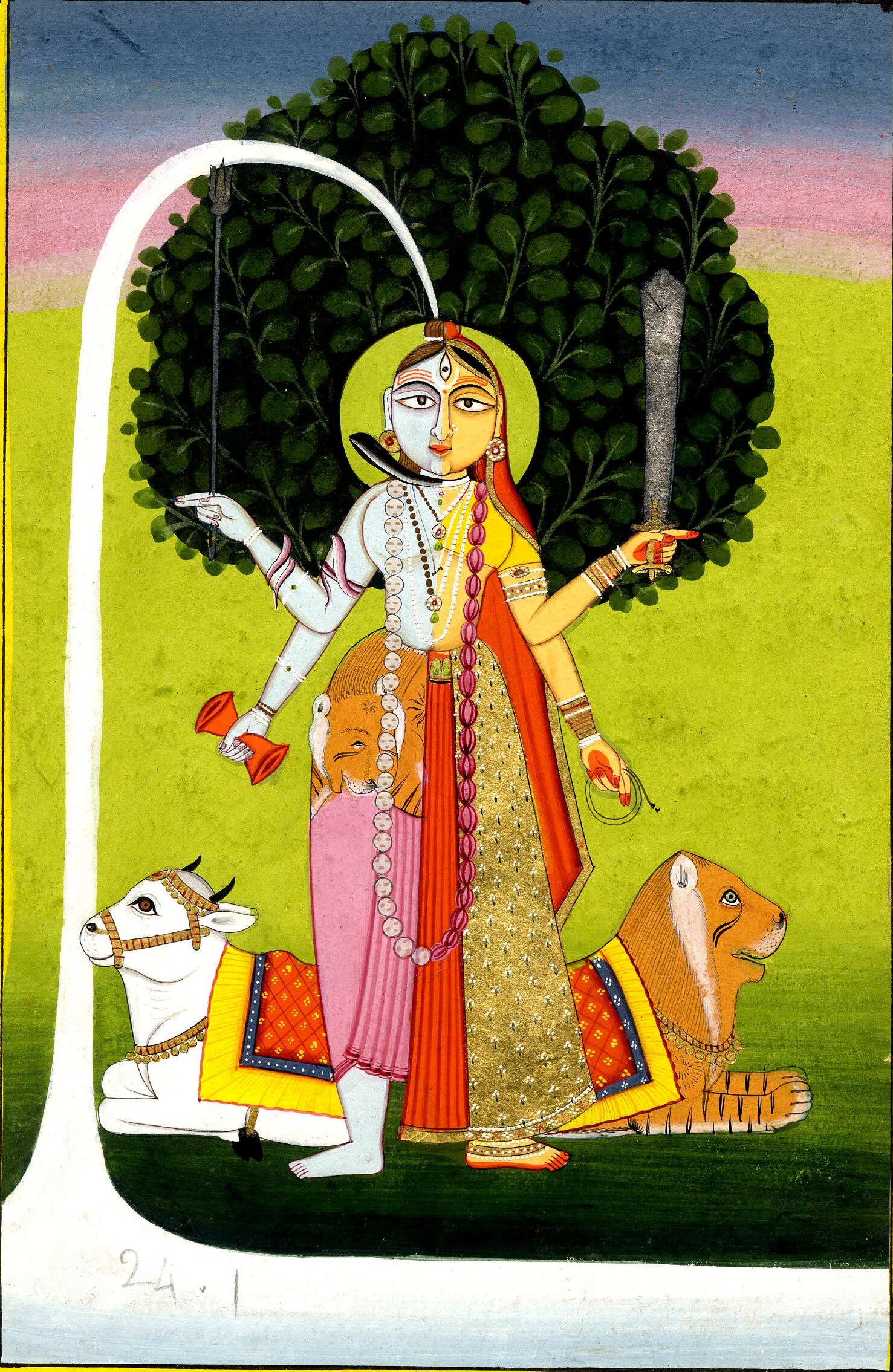
- Ardhanarishvara
- Devanagari: अर्धनारीश्वर
- Sanskrit transliteration: Ardhanārīśvara
- Affiliation: A combined form of Shiva and Parvati
- Weapon: Trishula
- Mount: Nandi and a lion named Somanandi

Ardhanarishvara (Sanskrit: अर्धनारीश्वर, romanized: Ardhanārīśvara, lit. 'the half-female Lord') is a form of the Hindu deity Shiva combined with his consort Parvati. Ardhanarishvara is depicted as half-male and half-female, equally split down the middle.

Ardhanarishvara represents the synthesis of masculine and feminine energies of the universe (Purusha and Prakriti) and illustrates how Shakti, the female principle of God, is inseparable from (or the same as, according to some interpretations) Shiva, the male principle of God, and vice versa. The union of these principles is exalted as the root and womb of all creation. Another view is that Ardhanarishvara is a symbol of Shiva's all-pervasive nature. The right half is usually the male Shiva, illustrating his traditional attributes.

The earliest Ardhanarishvara images are dated to the Kushan period, starting from the first century CE. Its iconography evolved and was perfected in the Gupta era. The Puranas and various iconographic treatises write about the mythology and iconography of Ardhanarishvara. Ardhanarishvara remains a popular iconographic form found in most Shiva temples throughout India, though very few temples are dedicated to this deity.

== Names ==
The name Ardhanarishvara means "the Lord Who is half woman". Ardhanarishvara is also known by other names like Ardhanaranari ("the half man-woman"), Ardhanarisha ("the Lord who is half woman"), Ardhanarinateshvara ("the Lord of Dance (Who is half-woman), Parangada, Naranari ("man-woman"), Ammaiyappan (a Tamil Name meaning "Mother-Father"), and Ardhayuvatishvara (in Assam, "the Lord whose half is a young woman or girl"). The Gupta-era writer Pushpadanta in his Mahimnastava refers to this form as dehardhaghatana ("Thou and She art each the half of one body"). Utpala, commenting on the Brihat Samhita, calls this form Ardha-Gaurishvara ("the Lord whose half is the fair one"; the fair one – Gauri – is an attribute of Parvati). The Vishnudharmottara Purana simply calls this form Gaurishvara ("The Lord/husband of Gauri).

== Origins and early images ==
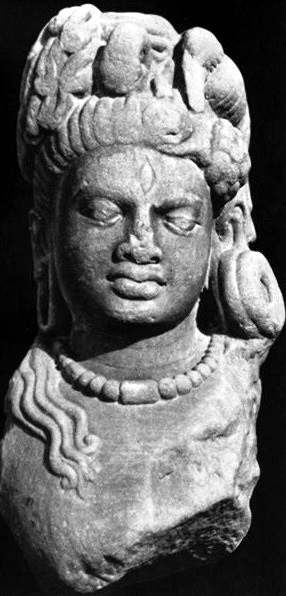
An early Kushan head of Ardhanarishvara, discovered at Rajghat, now in the Mathura Museum

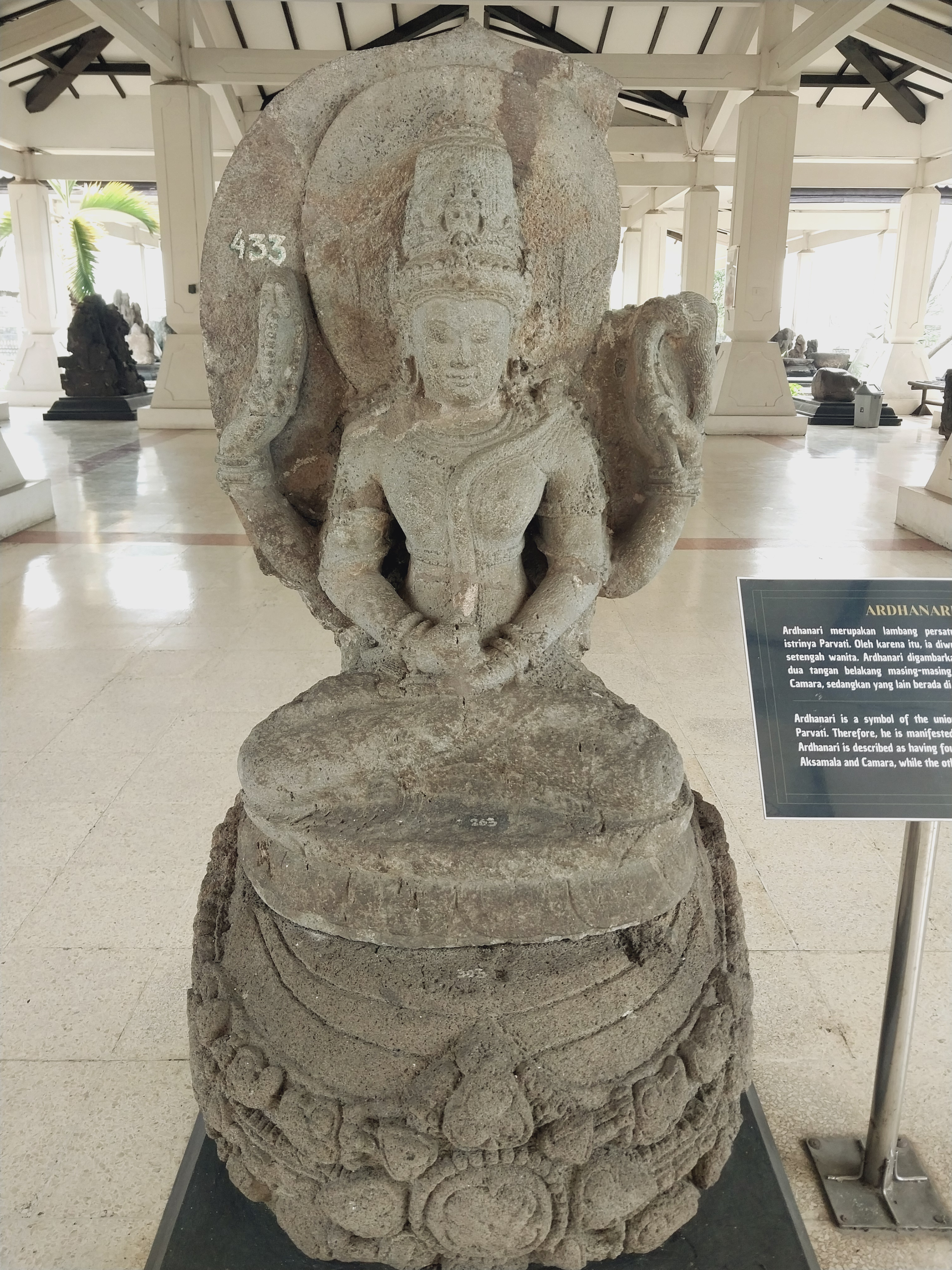
A statue of Ardhanarisvara in the Trowulan Museum in Indonesia

The conception of Ardhanarishvara may have been inspired by Vedic literature's composite figure of Yama-Yami, the Vedic descriptions of the primordial Creator Vishvarupa or Prajapati and the fire-god Agni as "bull who is also a cow," the Brihadaranyaka Upanishad's Atman ("Self") in the form of the androgynous cosmic entity Purusha and the androgynous myths of the Greek Hermaphroditus and Phrygian Agdistis. The Brihadaranyaka Upanishad says that Purusha splits himself into two parts, male and female, and the two halves copulate, producing all life – a theme concurrent in Ardhanarishvara's tales. The Shvetashvatara Upanishad sows the seed of the Puranic Ardhanarishvara. It declares Rudra – the antecedent of the Puranic Shiva – the maker of all and the root of Purusha (the male principle) and Prakriti (the female principle), adhering to Samkhya philosophy. It hints at his androgynous nature, describing him both as male and female.

The concept of Ardhanarishvara originated in Kushan and Greek cultures simultaneously; the iconography evolved in the Kushan era (30–375 CE), but was perfected in the Gupta era (320-600 CE). A mid-first century Kushan era stela in the Mathura Museum has a half-male, half-female image, along with three other figures identified with Vishnu, Gaja Lakshmi and Kubera. The male half is ithyphallic or with an urdhvalinga and makes an abhaya mudra gesture; the female left half holds a mirror and has a rounded breast. This is the earliest representation of Ardhanarishvara, universally recognized. An early Kushan Ardhanarishvara head discovered at Rajghat is displayed at the Mathura Museum. The right male half has matted hair with a skull and crescent moon; the left female half has well-combed hair decorated with flowers and wears a patra-kundala (earring). The face has a common third eye. A terracotta seal discovered in Vaishali has half-man, half-woman features. Early Kushan images show Ardhanarishvara in a simple two-armed form, but later texts and sculptures depict a more complex iconography.

Ardhanarishvara is referred to by the Greek author Stobaeus (c. 500 AD) while quoting Bardasanes (c. 154–222 AD), who learnt from an Indian embassy's visit to Syria during the reign of Elagabalus (Antoninus of Emesa) (218–22 AD). A terracotta androgynous bust, excavated at Taxila and dated to the Saka-Parthian era, pictures a bearded man with female breasts.

Ardhanarishvara is interpreted as an attempt to syncretise the two principal Hindu sects, Shaivism and Shaktism, dedicated to Shiva and the Great Goddess. A similar syncretic image is Harihara, a composite form of Shiva and Vishnu, the Supreme deity of the Vaishnava sect.

== Iconography ==
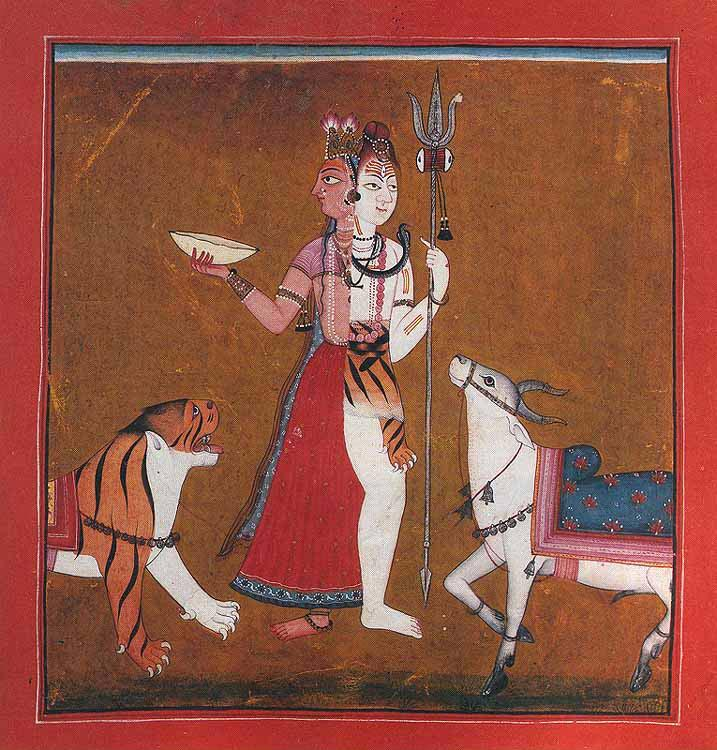
A rare example of a Shakta Ardhanarishvara, where the dominant right side is female

The iconographic 16th century work Shilparatna, the Matsya Purana and Agamic texts like Amshumadbhedagama, Kamikagama, Supredagama and Karanagama – most of them of South Indian origin – describe the iconography of Ardhanarishvara. The right superior side of the body usually is the male Shiva and the left is the female Parvati; in rare depictions belonging to the Shaktism school, the feminine holds the dominant right side. The icon usually is prescribed to have four, three or two arms, but rarely is depicted with eight arms. In the case of three arms, the Parvati side has only one arm, suggesting a lesser role in the icon.

=== Male half ===
The male half wears a jata-mukuta (a headdress formed of piled, matted hair) on his head, adorned with a crescent moon. Sometimes the jata-mukuta is adorned with serpents and the river goddess Ganga flowing through the hair. The right ear wears a nakra-kundala, sarpa-kundala ("serpent-earring") or ordinary kundala ("earring"). Sometimes, the male eye is depicted smaller than the female one and a half-moustache is also seen. A half third eye (trinetra) is prescribed on the male side of the forehead in the canons; a full eye may also be depicted in middle of forehead separated by both the sides or a half eye may be shown above or below Parvati's round dot. A common elliptical halo (prabhamandala/prabhavali) may be depicted behind the head; sometimes the shape of the halo may differ on either side.

In the four-armed form, a right hand holds a parashu (axe) and another makes an abhaya mudra (gesture of reassurance), or one of the right arms is slightly bent and rests on the head of Shiva's bull mount, Nandi, while the other is held in the abhaya mudra gesture. Another configuration suggests that a right hand holds a trishula (trident) and another makes a varada mudra (gesture of blessing). Another scripture prescribes that a trishula and akshamala (rosary) are held in the two right hands. In the two-armed form, the right hand holds a kapala (skull cup) or gestures in a varada mudra. He may also hold a skull. In the Badami relief, the four-armed Ardhanarishvara plays a veena (lute), using a left and a right arm, while other male arm holds a parashu and the female one a lotus.

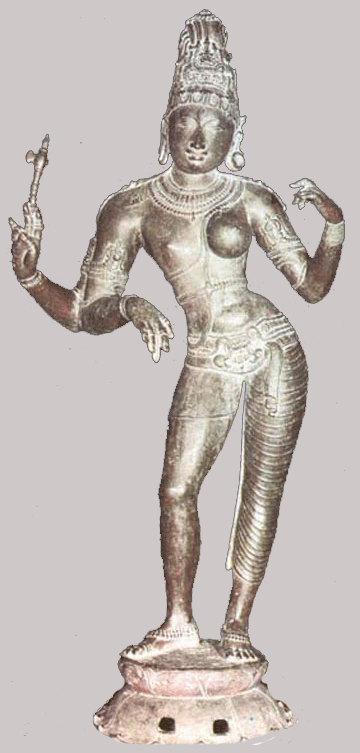
A three-armed bronze Ardhanarishvara

The Shiva half has a flat masculine chest, a straight vertical chest, broader shoulder, wider waist and muscular thigh. He wears a yagnopavita (sacred thread) across the chest, which is sometimes represented as a naga-yagnopavita (a snake worn as a yagnopavita) or a string of pearls or gems. The yajnopavita may also divide the torso into its male and female halves. He wears ornaments characteristic of Shiva's iconography, including serpent ornaments.

In some North Indian images, the male half may be nude and also be ithyphallic (urdhavlinga or urdhavreta: with an erect phallus), however, connotes the very opposite in this context. It contextualizes "seminal retention" or practice of celibacy (illustration of Urdhva Retas), and represents the deity as "the one who stands for complete control of the senses, and for the supreme carnal renunciation", other images found in North India include full or half phallus and one testicle. However, such imagery is never found in South Indian images; the loins are usually covered in a garment (sometimes a dhoti) of silk or cotton, or the skin of a tiger or deer), typically down to the knee, and held in place by a sarpa-mekhala, serpent girdle or jewellery. The right leg may be somewhat bent or straight and often rests on a lotus pedestal (padma-pitha). The whole right half is described as smeared with ashes and as terrible and red-coloured or gold or coral in appearance; however, these features are rarely depicted.

=== Female half ===
The female half has karanda-mukuta (a basket-shaped crown) on her head or well-combed knotted hair or both. The left ear wears a valika-kundala (a type of earring). A tilaka or bindu (a round red dot) adorns her forehead, matching Shiva's third eye. The left eye is painted with black eyeliner. While the male neck is sometimes adorned with a jewelled hooded serpent, the female neck has a blue lotus matching it.

In the four-armed form, one of the left arms rests on Nandi's head, while the other is bent in kataka mudra pose and holds a nilotpala (blue lotus) or hangs loosely at her side. In the three-armed representation, the left hand holds a flower, a mirror or a parrot. In the case of two-armed icons, the left hand rests on Nandi's head, hangs loose or holds either a flower, a mirror or a parrot. The parrot may be also perched on Parvati's wrist. Her hand(s) is/are adorned with ornaments like a keyura (anklet) or kankana (bangles).

Parvati has a well-developed, round bosom and a narrow feminine waist embellished with various haras (religious bracelets) and other ornaments, made of diamonds and other gems. She has a fuller thigh and a curvier body and hip than the male part of the icon. The torso, hip and pelvis of the female is exaggerated to emphasize the anatomical differences between the halves. Though the male private parts may be depicted, the female genitalia are never depicted and the loins are always draped. She wears a multi-coloured or white silken garment down to her ankle and one or three girdles around her waist. The left half wears an anklet and her foot is painted red with henna. The left leg may be somewhat bent or straight, resting on a lotus pedestal. In contrast to the Shiva half, the Parvati half – smeared with saffron – is described as calm and gentle, fair and parrot-green or dark in colour. She may be draped in a sari covering her torso and legs.

=== Postures and vahana ===
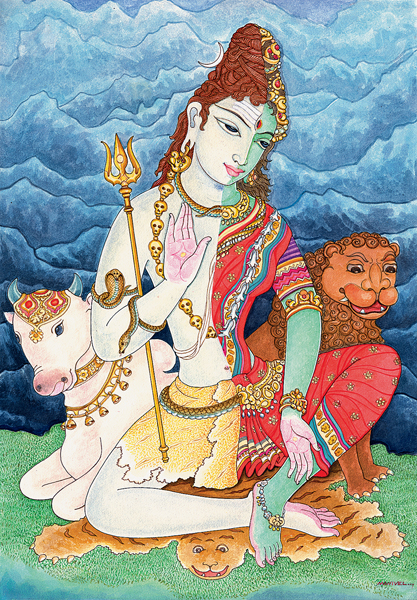
A seated Ardhanarishvara with both the vahanas

The posture of Ardhanarishvara may be tribhanga – bent in three parts: head (leaning to the left), torso (to the right) and right leg or in the sthanamudra position (straight), sometimes standing on a lotus pedestal, whereupon it is called samapada. Seated images of Ardhanarishvara are missing in iconographic treatises, but are still found in sculpture and painting. Though the canons often depict the Nandi bull as the common vahana (mount) of Ardhanarishvara, some depictions have Shiva's bull vahana seated or standing near or behind his foot, while the goddess's lion vahana is near her foot.

=== Eight-armed form ===
The Parashurameshvara Temple at Bhubaneswar has a dancing eight-armed Ardhanarishvara. The upper male arms hold a lute and akshamala (rosary), while the upper female ones hold a mirror and a book; the others are broken. Another non-conventional Ardhanarishvara is found at Darasuram. The sculpture is three-headed and eight-armed, holding akshamala, khadga (sword), pasha, musala, kapala (skull cup), lotus and other objects.

=== Other textual descriptions ===
The Naradiya Purana mentions that Ardhanarishvara is half-black and half-yellow, nude on one side and clothed on other, wearing skulls and a garland of lotuses on the male half and female half respectively. The Linga Purana gives a brief description of Ardhanarishvara as making varada and abhaya mudras and holding a trishula and a lotus. The Vishnudharmottara Purana prescribes a four-armed form, with right hands holding a rosary and trishula, while the left ones bear a mirror and a lotus. The form is called Gaurishvara in this text.

== Legends ==
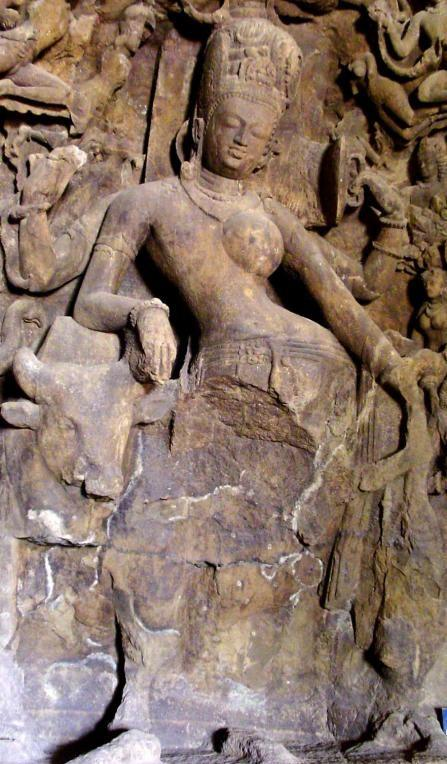
Ardhanarishvara relief is from the Elephanta Caves near Mumbai

The mythology of Ardhanarishvara – which mainly originates in the Puranic canons – was developed later to explain existent images of the deity that had emerged in the Kushan era.

The unnamed half-female form of Shiva is also alluded to in the epic Mahabharata. In Book XIII, Upamanyu praises Shiva rhetorically asking if there is anyone else whose half-body is shared by his spouse, and adds that the universe had risen from the union of sexes, as represented by Shiva's half-female form. In some narratives, Shiva is described as dark and fair-complexioned, half yellow and half white, half woman and half man, and both woman and man. In Book XIII, Shiva preaches to Parvati that half of his body is made up of her body.

In the Skanda Purana, Parvati requests Shiva to allow her to reside with him, embracing "limb-to-limb", and so Ardhanarishvara is formed. It also tells that when the demon Andhaka wanted to seize Parvati and make her his wife, Vishnu rescued her and brought her to his abode. When the demon followed her there, Parvati revealed her Ardhanarishvara form to him. Seeing the half-male, half-female form, the demon lost interest in her and left. Vishnu was amazed to see this form and saw himself in the female part of the form.

The Shiva Purana describes that the creator god Brahma created all male beings, the Prajapatis, and told them to regenerate, which they were unable to do. Confronted with the resulting decline in the pace of creation, Brahma was perplexed and contemplated on Shiva for help. To enlighten Brahma of his folly, Shiva appeared before him as Ardhanarishvara. Brahma prayed to the female half of Shiva to give him a female to continue creation. The goddess agreed and created various female powers from her body, thereby allowing creation to progress. In other Puranas like the Linga Purana, Vayu Purana, Vishnu Purana, Skanda Purana, Kurma Purana, and Markandeya Purana, Rudra (identified with Shiva) appears as Ardhanarishvara, emerging from Brahma's head, forehead, mouth or soul as the embodiment of Brahma's fury and frustration due to the slow pace of creation. Brahma asks Rudra to divide himself, and the latter complies by dividing into male and female. Numerous beings, including the 11 Rudras and various female shaktis, are created from both the halves. In some versions, the goddess unites with Shiva again and promises to be born as Sati on earth to be Shiva's wife. In the Linga Purana, the Ardhanarishvara Rudra is so hot that in the process of appearing from Brahma's forehead, he burns Brahma himself. Ardhanarishvara Shiva then enjoys his own half – the Great Goddess – by "the path of yoga" and creates Brahma and Vishnu from her body. In the repetitive cycle of aeons, Ardhanarishvara is ordained to reappear at the beginning of every creation as in the past.

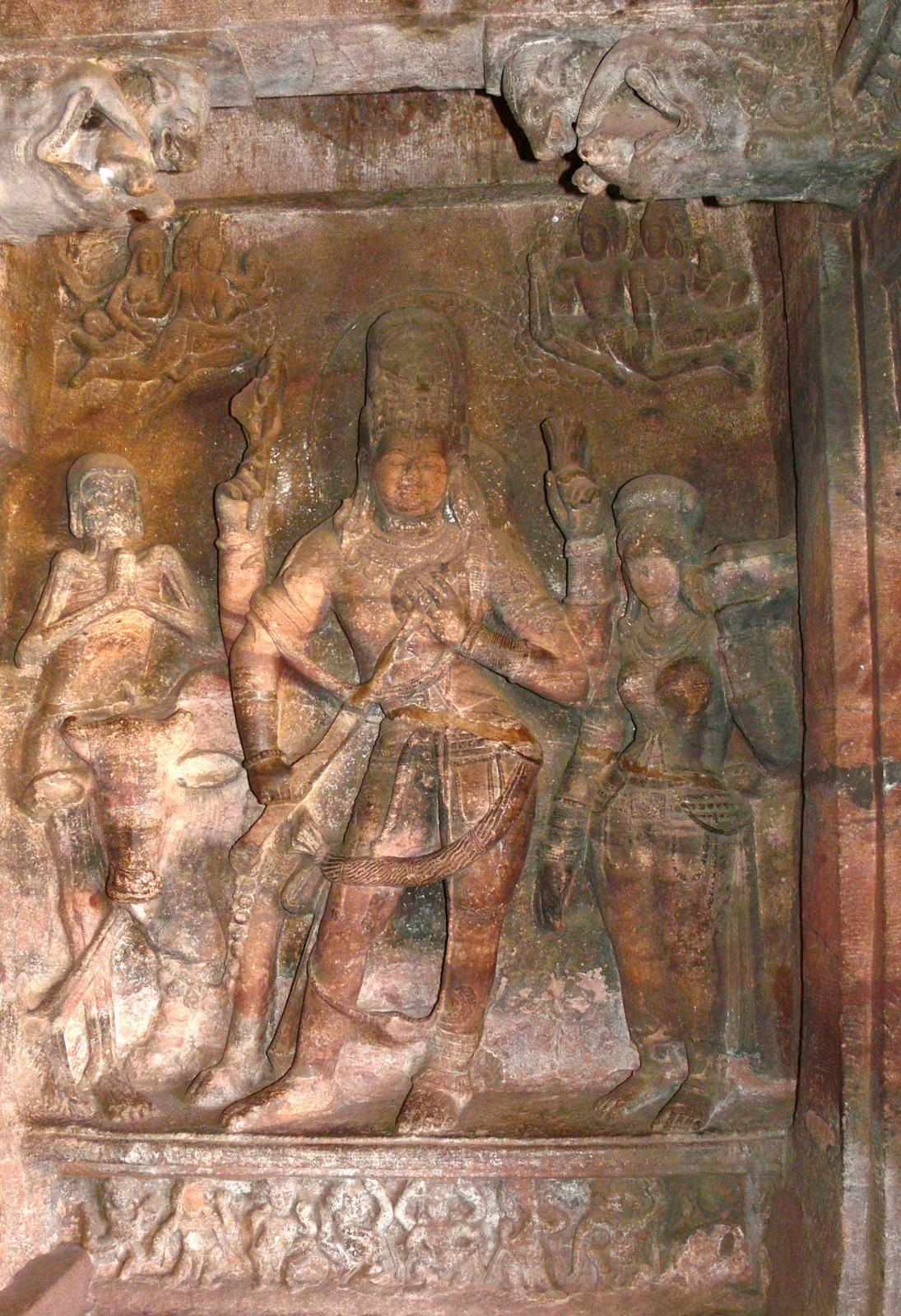
Ardhanarishvara playing a veena surrounded by Bhringi and a female attendant, Badami

The Matsya Purana describes how Brahma, pleased with a penance performed by Parvati, rewards her by blessing her with a golden complexion. This renders her more attractive to Shiva, to whom she later merges as one half of his body.

Tamil temple lore narrates that once the gods and sages (rishi) had gathered at Shiva's abode, they prayed their respects to Shiva and Parvati. However, the sage Bhringi had vowed to worship only one deity, Shiva, and ignored Parvati while worshipping and circumambulating him. Agitated, Parvati cursed Bhringi to lose all his flesh and blood, reducing him to a skeleton. In this form Bhringi could not stand erect, so the compassionate ones who witnessed the scene blessed the sage with a third leg for support. As her attempt to humiliate the sage had failed, Parvati punished herself with austerities that pleased Shiva and led him to grant her the boon of uniting with him, thereby compelling Bhringi to worship her as well as himself in the form of Ardhanarishvara. However, the sage assumed the form of a beetle and circumambulating only the male half, drilling a hole in the deity. Amazed by his devotion, Parvati reconciled with the sage and blessed him. The seventh-century Shaiva Nayanar saint Appar mentions that after marrying Parvati, Shiva incorporated her into half of his body.

In the Kalika Purana, Parvati (called Gauri here) is described as having suspected Shiva of infidelity when she saw her own reflection in the crystal-like breast of Shiva. A conjugal dispute erupted but was quickly resolved, after which Parvati wished to stay eternally with Shiva in his body. The divine couple was thereafter fused as Ardhanarishvara. Another tale from North India also talks about Parvati's jealousy. Another woman, the river Ganga – often depicted flowing out of Shiva's locks – sat on his head, while Parvati (as Gauri) sat on his lap. To pacify Gauri, Shiva united with her as Ardhanarishvara.

Only in tales associated with the hindu sect of Shakta (in which the Goddess is considered the Supreme Being) is the Goddess venerated as the Maker of All. In these tales, it is her body (not Shiva's) which splits into male and female halves.

== Symbolism ==
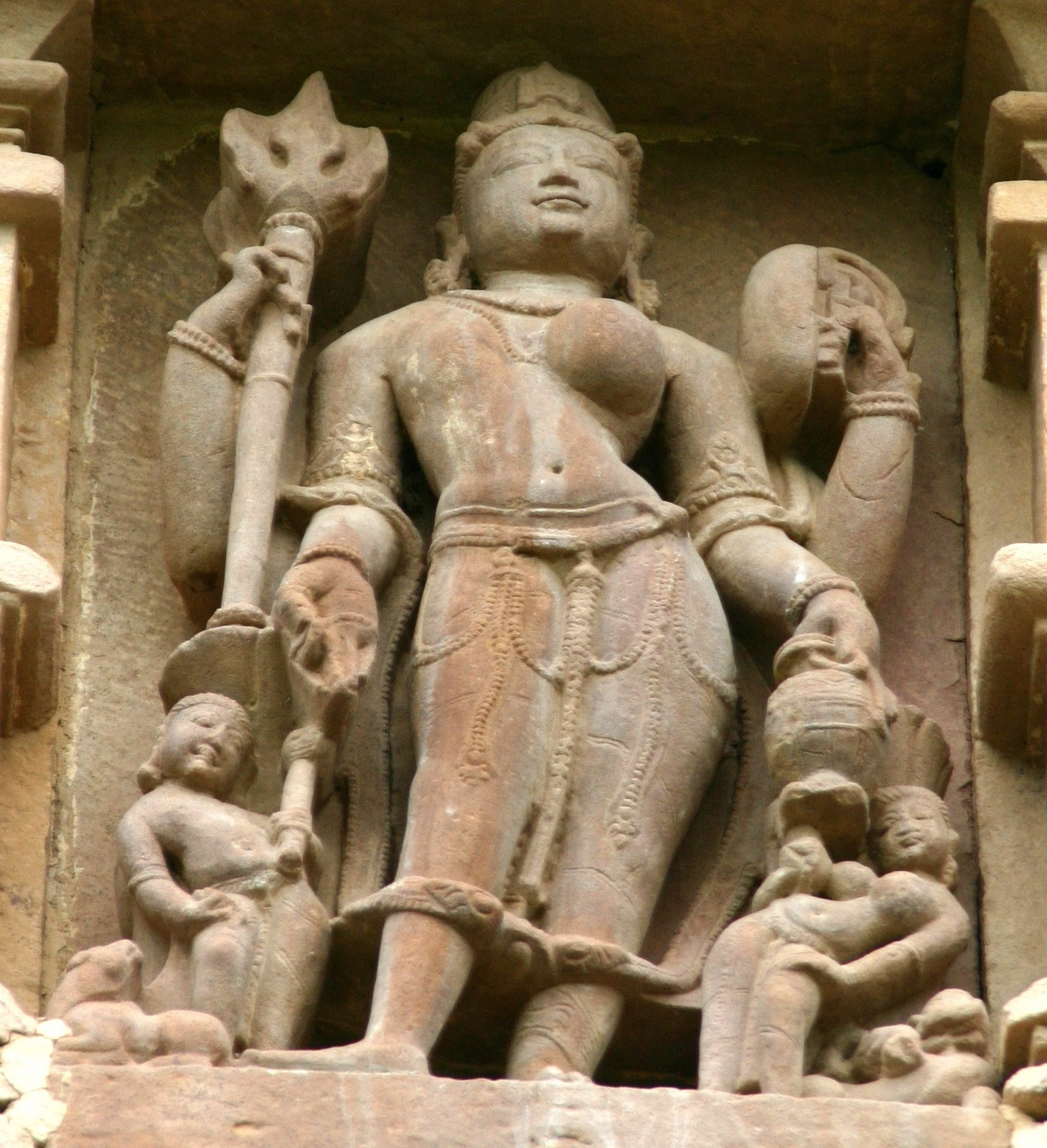
Ardhanarishvara sculpture, Khajuraho, depicting Shiva with Parvati as his equal half.

Ardhanarishvara symbolizes that the male and female principles are inseparable. The composite form conveys the unity of opposites (coniunctio oppositorum) in the universe. The male half of Ardhanarishvara stands for Purusha and female half is Prakriti. Purusha is the male principle and passive force of the universe, while Prakriti is the female active force; both are "constantly drawn to embrace and fuse with each other, though... separated by the intervening axis". The union of Purusha (Shiva) and Prikriti (Shiva's energy, Shakti) generates the universe, an idea also manifested in the union of the Linga of Shiva and Yoni of Devi creating the cosmos. The Mahabharata lauds this form as the source of creation. Ardhanarishvara also suggests the element of Kama or Lust, which leads to creation.

Ardhanarishvara signifies "totality that lies beyond duality", "bi-unity of male and female in God" and "the bisexuality and therefore the non-duality" of the Supreme Being. It conveys that God is both Shiva and Parvati, "both male and female, both father and mother, both aloof and active, both fearsome and gentle, both destructive and constructive" and unifies all other dichotomies of the universe. While Shiva's rosary in the Ardhanarishvara iconography associates him with asceticism and spirituality, Parvati's mirror associates her to the material illusory world. Ardhanarishvara reconciles and harmonizes the two conflicting ways of life: the spiritual way of the ascetic as represented by Shiva, and the materialistic way of the householder as symbolized by Parvati, who invites the ascetic Shiva into marriage and the wider circle of worldly affairs. The interdependence of Shiva on his power (Shakti) as embodied in Parvati is also manifested in this form. Ardhanarishvara conveys that Shiva and Shakti are one and the same, an interpretation also declared in inscriptions found along with Ardhanarishvara images in Java and the eastern Malay Archipelago. The Vishnudharmottara Purana also emphasizes the identity and sameness of the male Purusha and female Prakriti, manifested in the image of Ardhanarishvara. According to Shaiva guru Sivaya Subramuniyaswami (1927–2001), Ardhanarishvara signifies that the great Shiva is "All, inseparable from His energy" (i.e. his Shakti) and is beyond gender.

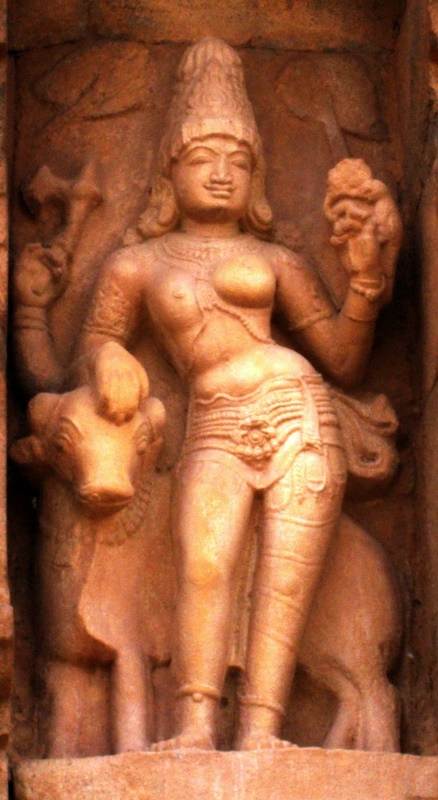
A three-armed Ardhanarishvara sculpture with only Nandi as a vahana, 11th century, Gangaikonda Cholapuram temple

Across cultures, androgynous figures like Ardhanarishvara have traditionally been associated with fertility and abundant growth. In this form, Shiva in his eternal embrace with Prakriti represents the eternal reproductive power of Nature, whom he regenerates after she loses her fertility. "It is a duality in unity, the underlying principle being a sexual dualism". Art historian Sivaramamurti calls it "a unique connection of the closely knit ideal of man and woman rising above the craving of the flesh and serving as a symbol of hospitality and parenthood". The dual unity of Ardhanarishvara is considered "a model of conjugal inseparability". Padma Upadhyaya comments, "The idea of ... Ardhanārīśvara is to locate the man in the woman as also the woman in the man and to create perfect homogeneity in domestic affairs".

Often, the right half of Ardhanarishvara is male and the left is female. The left side is the location of the heart and is associated with 'feminine' characteristics like intuition and creativity, while the right is associated with the brain and 'masculine' traits – logic, valour and systematic thought. The female is often not equal in the Ardhanarishvara, the male god who is half female; she remains a dependent entity. Ardhanarishvara "is in essence Shiva, not Parvati". This is also reflected in mythology, where Parvati becomes a part of Shiva. It is likewise reflected in iconography: Shiva often has two supernatural arms and Parvati has just one earthly arm, and his bull vahana – not her lion vahana – typically accompanies them.

== Worship ==
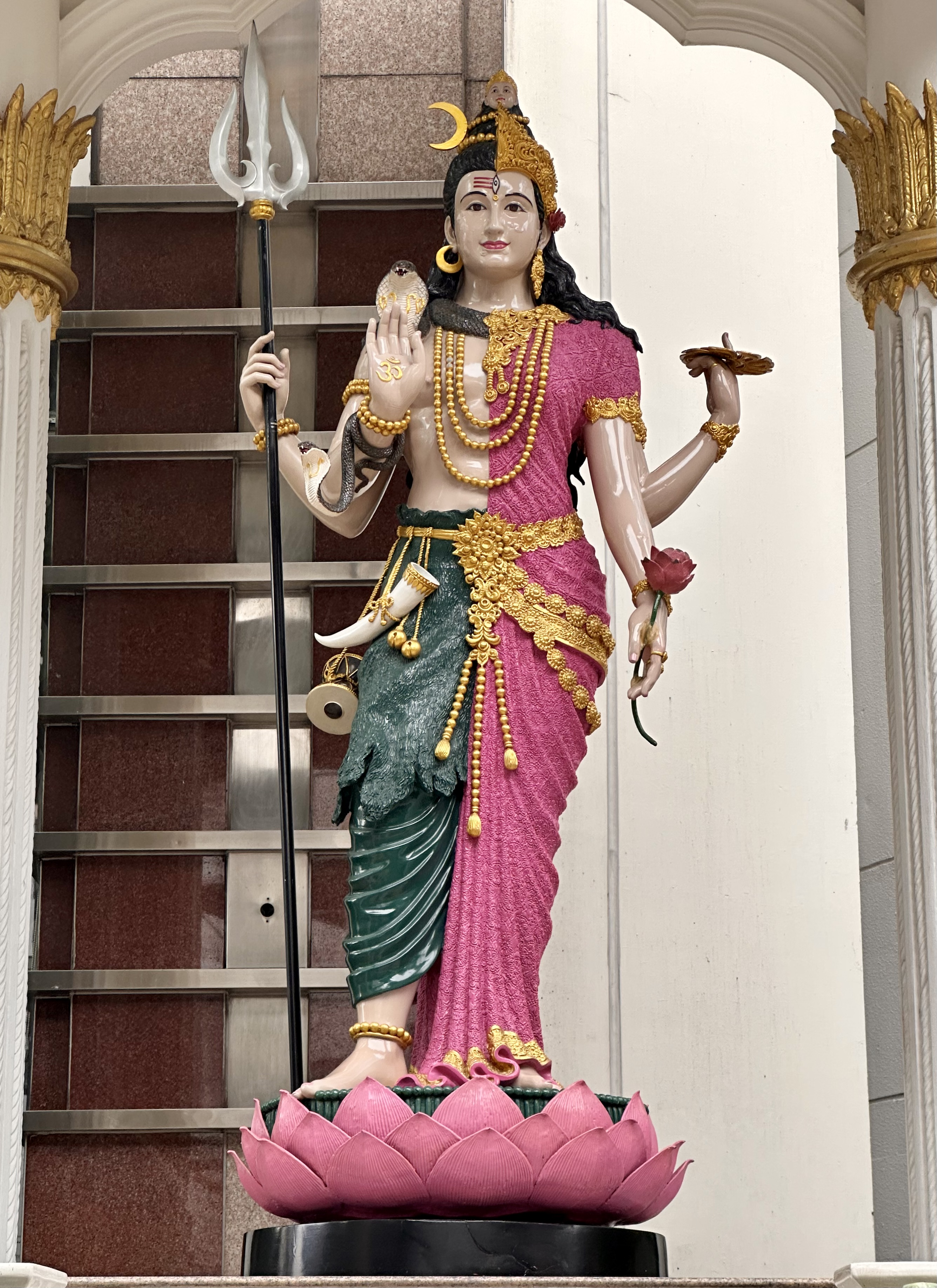
Ardhanarishvara statue, Bangkok

Ardhanarishvara is one of the most popular iconographic forms of Shiva. It is found in more or less all temples and shrines dedicated to Shiva all over India and South-east Asia. There is ample evidence from texts and the multiple depictions of the Ardhanarishvara in stone to suggest that a cult centred around the deity may have existed. The cult may have had occasional followers, but was never aligned to any sect. This cult focusing on the joint worship of Shiva and the Goddess may even have had a high position in Hinduism, but when and how it faded away remains a mystery. Though a popular iconographic form, temples dedicated to the deity are few. A popular one is located in Thiruchengode, while five others are located in Kallakkurichi taluk, all of them in the Indian state of Tamil Nadu. Thiruvannamalai Temple, Pavala Kundru, is considered as the place were lord shiva gave his equal half to Parvati as per Skanda Purana, Maheshwara Khanta. To remember this yearly once during Karthika Deepam festival day, an Idol of Arthanareeswara is decorated and taken out for 2 minutes for devotees, Lakhs of peoples and Media witness this festival.

The Linga Purana advocates the worship of Ardhanarishvara by devotees to attain union with Shiva upon dissolution of the world and thus attain salvation. The Ardhanarinateshvara Stotra composed by Adi Shankaracharya is a popular hymn dedicated to the deity. The Nayanar saints of Tamil Nadu exalt the deity in hymns. While the 8th-century Nayanar saint Sundarar says that Shiva is always inseparable from the Mother Goddess, another 7th-century Nayanar saint Sambandar describes how the "eternal feminine" is not only his consort, but she is also part of him. The renowned Sanskrit writer Kalidasa (c. 4th–5th century) alludes Ardhanarishvara in invocations of his Raghuvamsa and Malavikagnimitram, and says that Shiva and Shakti are as inseparable as word and meaning. The 9th-century Nayanar saint Manikkavacakar casts Parvati in the role of the supreme devotee of Shiva in his hymns. He alludes to Ardhanarishvara several times and regards it the ultimate goal of a devotee to be united with Shiva as Parvati is in the Ardhanarishvara form.

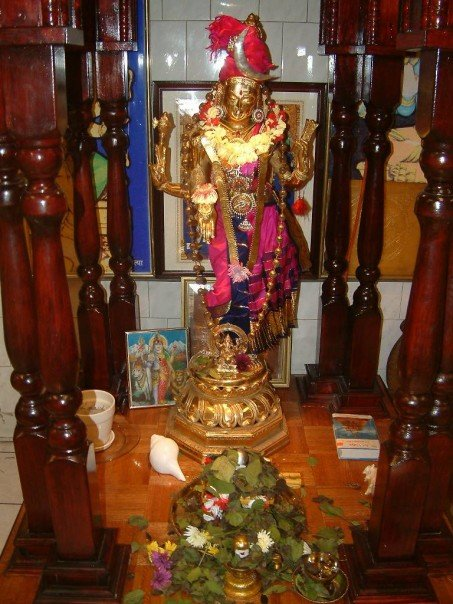
Ardhanarishvara worshipped at Sri Rajarajeswari Peetam

== See also ==
- Shatkona, a six-pointed star, with a meaning similar (if not the same) as Ardhanarishvara.
- Harihara: composite form of the gods Shiva and Vishnu
- Jumadi: a regional composite form of Shiva and Parvati
- Vaikuntha Kamalaja: composite form of Vishnu and Lakshmi
- Harishankari: composite form of Lakshmi and Parvati
- Shilanath Mahadev Mandir
- Hieros gamos (a sacred marriage in Ancient Classical Greco-Roman mythology)
