= Bhringi =

Sage in Hinduism

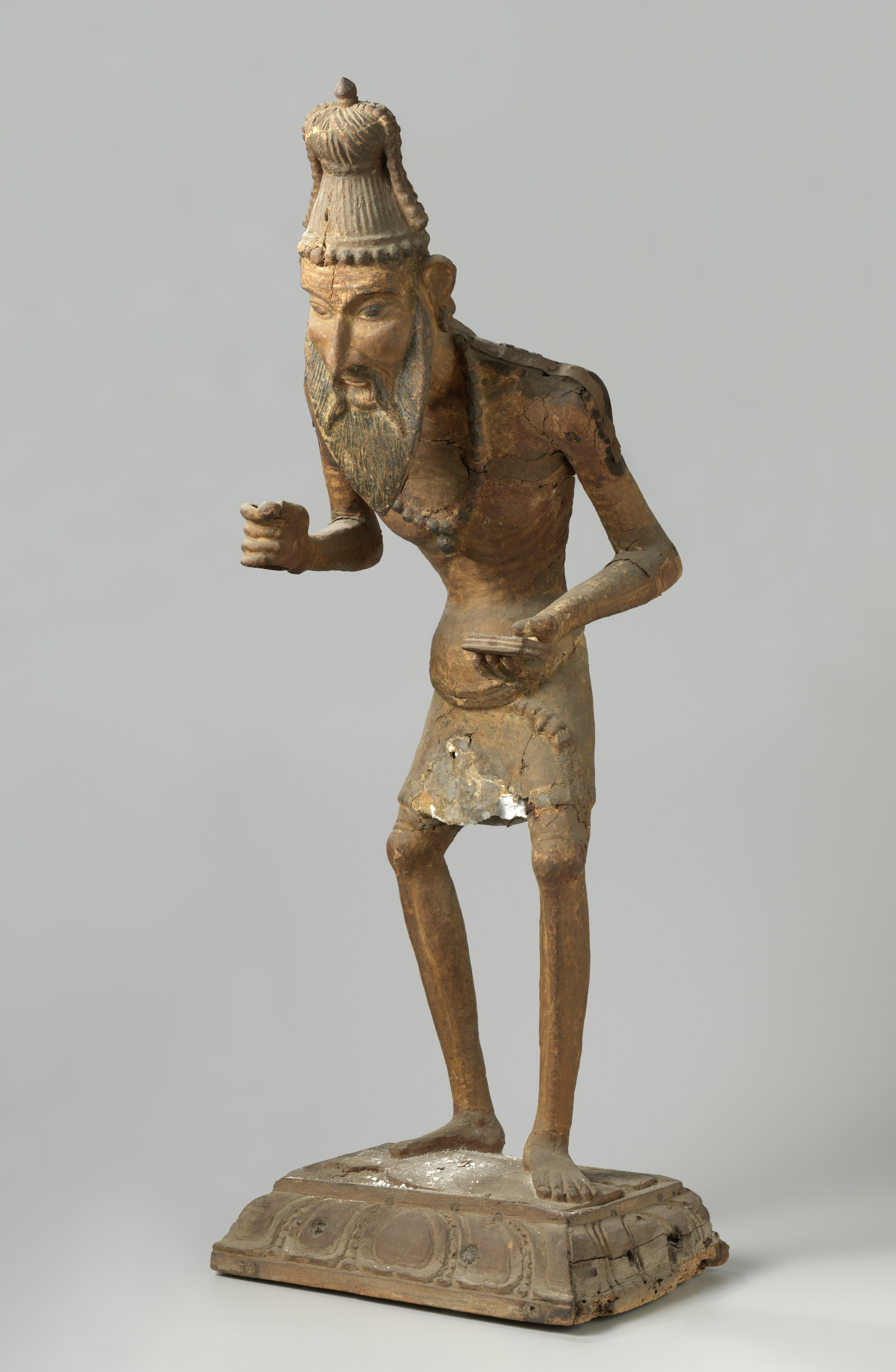
- Sculpture of Bhringi
- Affiliation: Rishi, Shaivism
- Texts: Puranas

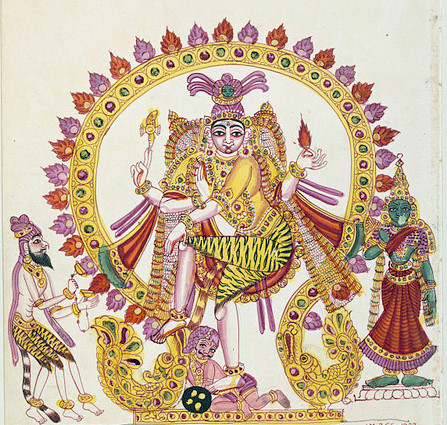
Bhringi (left) worshipping Shiva as Nataraja.

Bhringi (Sanskrit: भृङ्गी, romanized: Bhṛṅgī, lit. 'female beetle') is a rishi in Hinduism, described to be a great devotee of Shiva, the Hindu destroyer deity.

== Legend ==
According to the Shiva Purana and Tamil Sthala Puranas, all the rishis who paid homage to Shiva also offered their veneration to Parvati, the consort of Shiva. One day, Sage Bhringi visited Kailāsa, the abode of Shiva, and expressed his desire to circumambulate only Shiva. As he started to go around Shiva, Parvati required that he circumambulate her as well, stating that they were two halves of the same being. Bhringi, however, was so focused on Shiva that he had no desire to go around Parvati. Observing this, Parvati sat on Shiva's lap, making it difficult for Bhringi to go around Shiva alone. Undeterred, Bhringi assumed the form of a female beetle (Bhṛṅgī) and attempted to fly between the two. Infuriated, Parvati cursed the sage to become physically weak, which caused him to collapse, unable to support his body. Bhringi prayed to Shiva, and was able to acquire a third leg. In this manner, Bhringi is described to eventually become a Maharishi.

According to local variations of this legend, Shiva and Parvati united to assume the form of a composite deity called Ardhanarishvara. When Bhringi attempted to bore a hole through them to circumambulate only the deity's half of Shiva, Parvati cursed him, depriving him of his flesh and blood, the symbolic feminine aspect of men. Bhringi was suitably chastised. To enable him to stand upright, he was given a third leg, so that his legs served as a tripod.
