= Harishankari =

Harishankari (Sanskrit: हरिशङ्करी, Hariśaṅkarī) is a composite manifestation of the goddesses Lakshmi and Parvati, primarily ventured in Nepal. This concept emphasizes the unity of divine feminine energies. The name combines Hari—a title of Vishnu representing Lakshmi—and Shankara—an epithet of Shiva representing Parvati—symbolizing the harmonious fusion of their consorts’ attributes.

Varaha Purana Chapter 58

3-4. He should worship Hari with Laksmi or Rudra with Uma. Laksmi is identical with Uma and Hari is identical with Rudra. It is so declared in all Sastras and Puranas. Any Sàstra or Kàvya which states otherwise is not worthy

of its name.

5-6. Visnu should be considered the same as Rudra and Laksmi the same as Gauri. He who speaks of difference between them is lowly (Adharma) and should be considered an atheist outside the field of dharma.
