= Dave (surname) =

- Pronunciation: Gujarati pronunciation: [ˈdəʋɛ]

Origin
- Language: Gujarati
- Meaning: "(one who has studied) two Vedas"
- Region of origin: Gujarat, Maharashtra, Rajasthan and Madhya Pradesh (India)

Dave (દવે; Gujarati pronunciation: [ˈdəʋɛː]) is a Gujarati Brahmin surname. This surname is common amongst the Audichya, Rajgor and Khedaval Brahmins hailing from the Indian state of Gujarat. Many Audichya Brahmins assumed this surname to indicate their expertise and mastery over two Vedas. This surname also denotes the Brahmin caste. It is derived from Sanskrit dvivedī "(one who has studied) two Vedas" (via Middle Indo-Aryan duvea then Old Gujarati duve).

== Notable people with the surname ==
- Ashok Dave (born 1952), Indian Gujarati columnist and humourist
- Balmukund Dave (1916–1993), Indian Gujarati journalist and poet
- Eva Dave (1931–2009), Indian Gujarati writer
- Jyotindra Dave (1901–1980), Indian Gujarati humourist
- Harindra Dave (1930–1995), Indian Gujarati poet, journalist, playwright and novelist
- Harish Krishnaram Dave (born 1953), Indian Gujarati poet and translator known as Harish Meenashru
- Himmatlal Ramchandra Dave (1887–1976), Indian Gujarati writer and monk known as Swami Anand
- Ishan Davé (born 1989), Canadian actor
- Kavin Dave (born 1984), Indian film actor
- Ketki Dave (born 1960), Indian film actress
- Kinjal Dave (born 1999), Indian singer from Gujara
- Makarand Dave (1922–2005), Indian Gujarati poet and author
- Mauli Dave (born 1987), Indian singer
- Narmadashankar Dave (1833–1886), Indian Gujarati activist and writer known as Narmad
- Ranchhodbhai Dave (1837–1923), Indian Gujarati playwright and writer
- Raksha Dave (born 1977), British archaeologist and television presenter

== See also ==
- Dwivedi
