= Tave (surname) =

Tave is a surname. Notable people with the surname include:

- Stuart Tave (1923–2026), American literary scholar
- Vivianne Fock Tave, Seychellois diplomat

== See also ==
- Dave (surname)
- Tare (surname)
