= Ayudha Puja =

Hindu observance

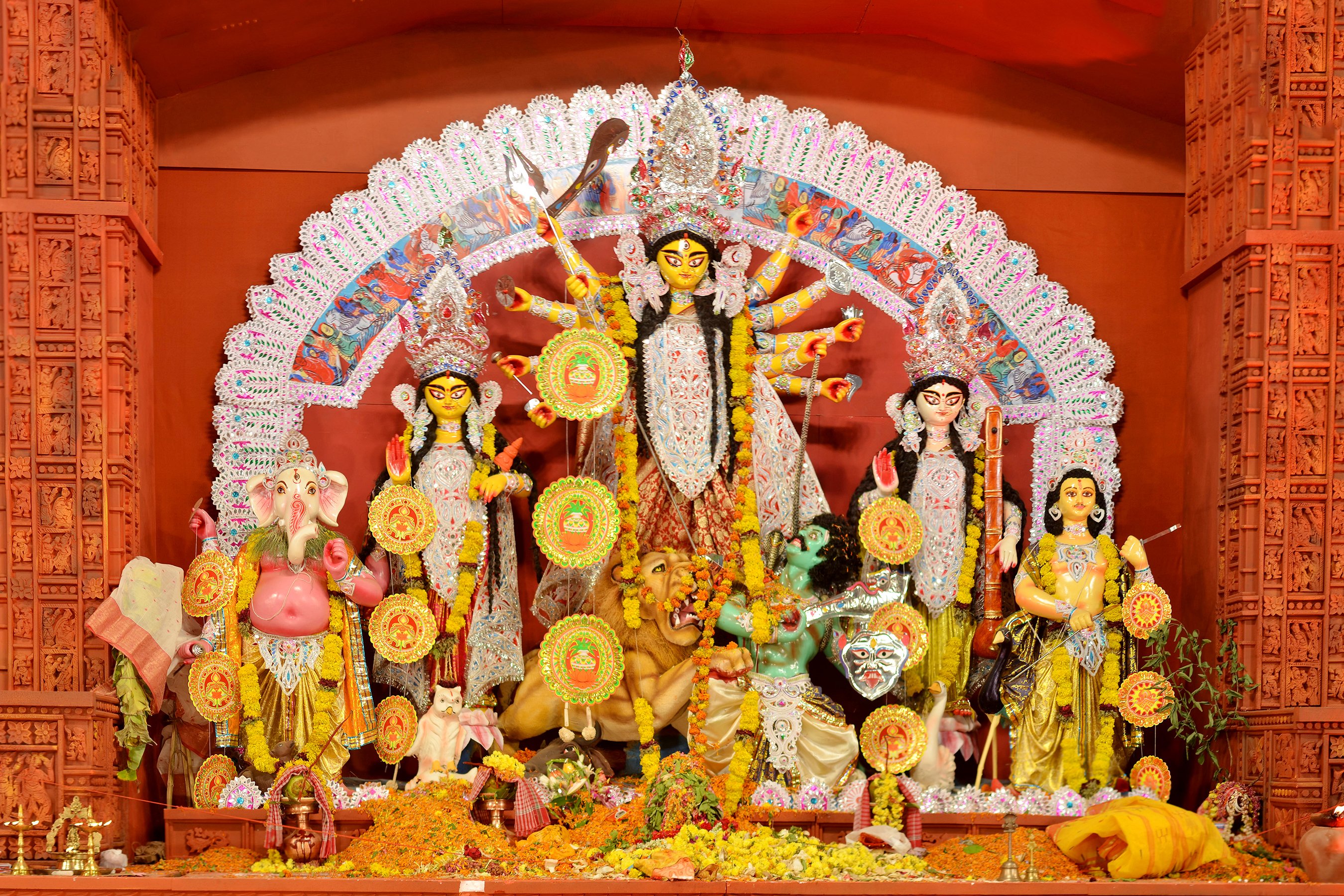
- Murti of the goddess Durga, venerated on Ayudha Pooja
- Also called: Ayudha Puja also observed as Saraswathi Puja
- Observed by: Hindus
- Type: Religious
- Celebrations: Ayudha Puja and Saraswati Puja
- Observances: Veneration of implements, machines, weapons, books, and musical instruments
- Begins: The Navami (ninth) day of Navaratri
- 2026 date: 20 October 2026
- Frequency: Annual
- Related to: Navaratri, Golu

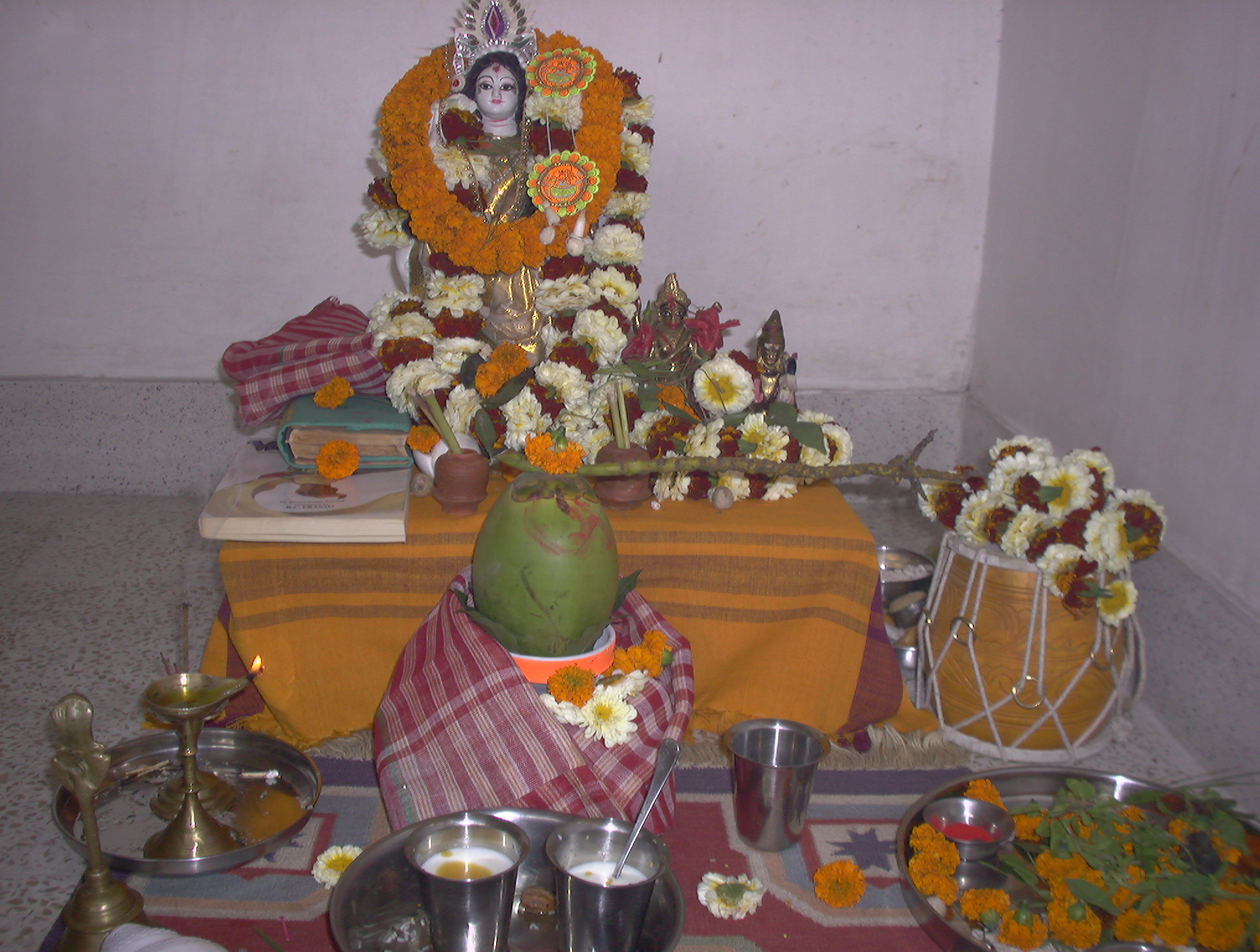
Saraswati Puja (goddess of wisdom & learning) is also performed concurrent with Ayudha Puje. Books and drums are kept for her blessings.

Ayudha Puja (Sanskrit: आयुध पूजा, romanized: Āyudha Pūjā, lit. 'worship of tools') is a Hindu observance that falls on the ninth day of the bright half of the moon's cycle of 15 days (as per the Hindu calendar) in the month of September/October, popularly a part of the Navaratri festival. While the Navaratri festival is observed all over the country, the festivity that is widely marked as Ayudha Puja possesses slight variations of veneration and practices across India.

The principal goddesses worshipped during the Ayudha Puja are Saraswati, the goddess of learning, Lakshmi, the goddess of prosperity, and Parvati, the goddess of power. On this occasion, the implements employed by people of various professions and walks of life are customarily venerated, such as the weapons of a soldier, tools of an artisan, and the books of a student. The religious significance of this occasion is to commemorate the victory of the goddess Durga over Mahishasura, or the conquest of Lanka by Rama. In South India, the occasion is primarily dedicated to Saraswati, with the practice of educational materials such as books, pens, pencils, musical instruments, and other equipment being venerated, to signify the victory of knowledge over ignorance.

In the contemporary era, the tradition of this occasion is retained by the consecration of computers, typewriters, and mobile phones in the same manner as practiced in the past for weapons of warfare. In Orissa, tools traditionally used for cultivation like plough, war like sword and dagger, and inscription writing like "karani" or "lekhani" (metal stylus) are worshipped.

== Nomenclature ==
It is celebrated in Karnataka (in the erstwhile Mysore State) as “Ayudha Puje” (Kannada: ಆಯುಧ ಪೂಜೆ), in Tamil Nadu as Ayudha Pujai (Tamil: ஆயுத பூஜை), in Telangana and Andhra Pradesh as Aayudha Pooja (Telugu: ఆయుధ పూజ), in Kerala as Ayudha Puja (Malayalam: ആയുധ പൂജ), "Astra Puja" (Odia: ଅସ୍ତ୍ର ପୂଜା) or "Ayudha Puja" in Odisha, and "Shastra Puja" or "Ayudha Puja/ Khande Navami" (Marathi: आयुध पूजा/ खंडे नवमी) in Maharashtra.

== Legend ==
Two Hindu legends relate to this festival. The popular legend which was also practiced symbolically by the Maharajas of Mysore alludes to one legend. It is said that on Vijayadashami day Arjuna, third of the five Pandava brothers, retrieved his weapons of war from the hole in the shami tree where he had hidden it before proceeding on the forced exile. After completing his vanavasa (exile period) of 13 years, including one year of Agyatavas (living incognito) before embarking on the warpath against the Kauravas he retrieved his weapons. In the Kurukshetra War that ensued, Arjuna was victorious. Pandavas returned on Vijayadashami day and since then it is believed that this day is auspicious to begin any new venture. In Karnataka, Ayudha Puja is celebrated by the general public one day before the original festival day Vijayadashami (the Ayudha Puja Day).

Another legend is of a pre-battle ritual involving yagna or ritual sacrifice or as part of the Ayudha Puja (considered a sub-rite of Navaratri festival that starts after the rainy season and is propitiated before launching military campaigns). This practice is no more prevalent. The past practice is narrated in the Tamil version of Mahabharata epic. In this ritual, prevalent than in Tamil Nadu, ‘Kalapalli’ was a “sacrifice to the battlefield. Duryodhana, the Kaurava chief was advised by astrologer (Sahadeva) that the propitious time for performing Kalapalli was on amavasya day (new moon day), one day before the start of Kurukshetra War and Iravan (son of Arjuna), also spelt Aravan, had agreed to be the victim for the sacrifice. But Krishna, the benefactor of Pandavas smelt trouble and he devised a plan to persuade Iravan to be the representative of the Pandavas and also of the Kauravas. Krishna had suggested to Yudhishthira-the eldest of the Pandavas, to sacrifice Aravan to goddess Kali as a part of Ayudha Puja. After this sacrifice, Kali had blessed Pandavas for victory in the Kurukshetra war.

== Mode of veneration ==
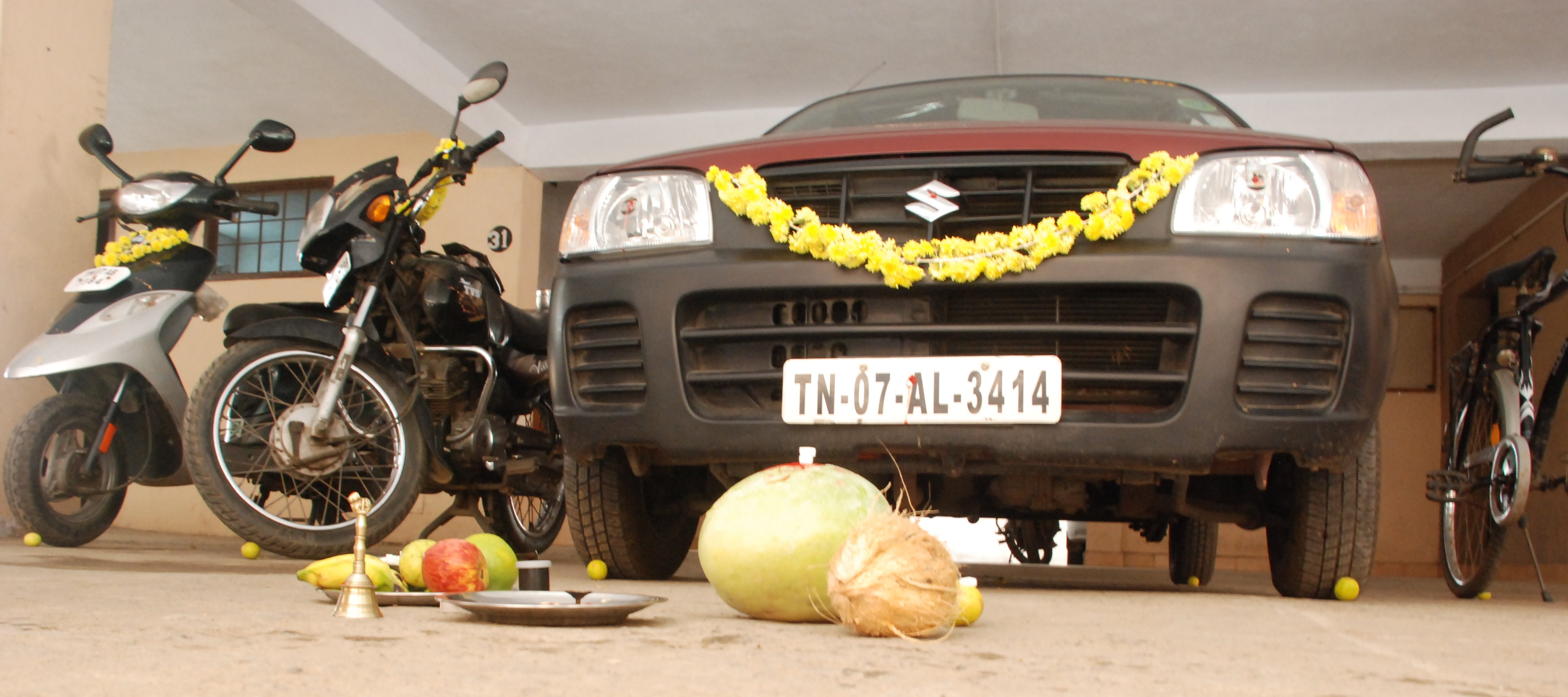
Veneration of vehicles as part of Ayudha Puja

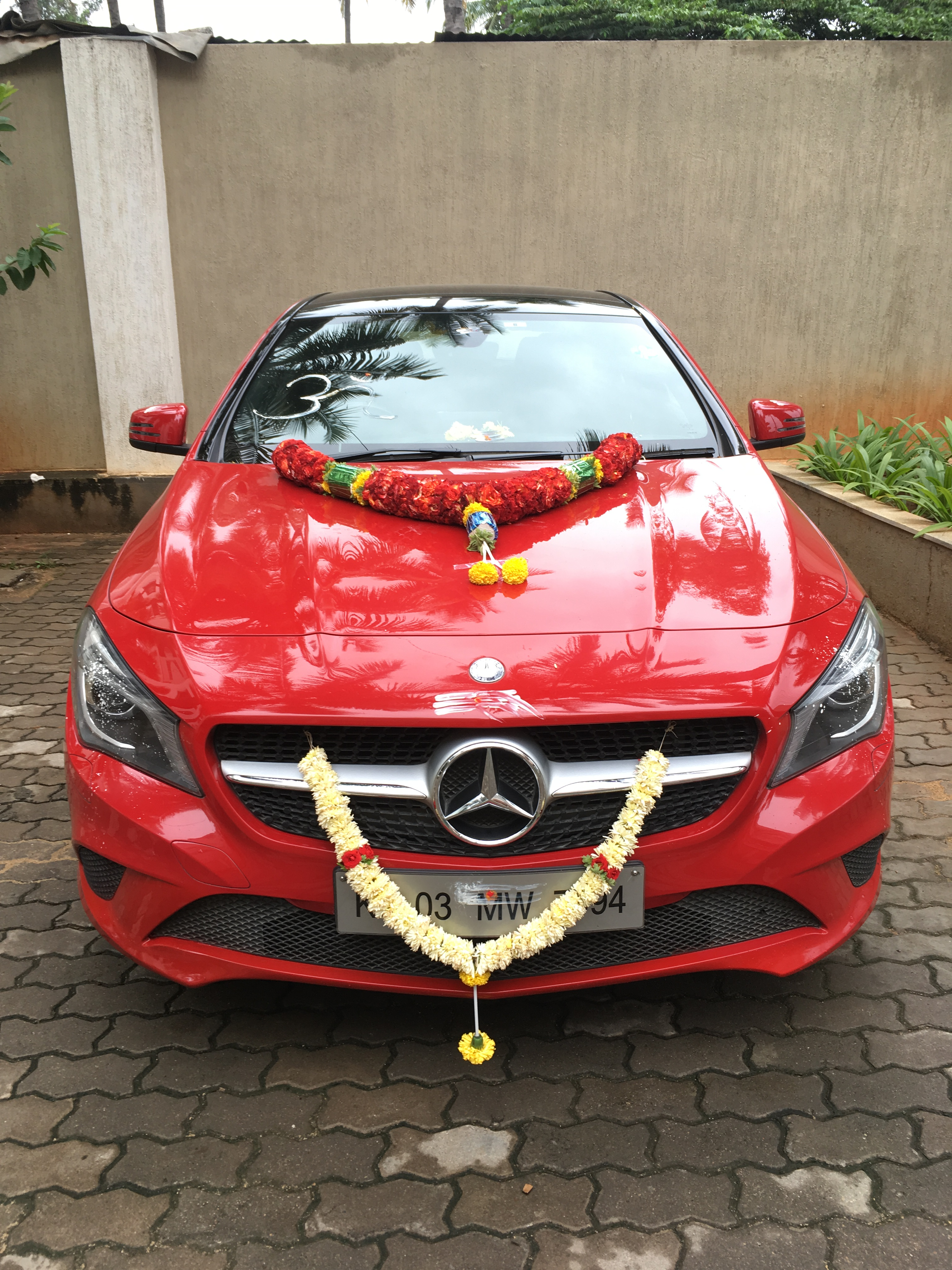
An imported car decorated for the Puja

The tools and all implements of vocation are first cleaned. All the tools, machines, vehicles and other devices are then painted or well polished after which they are smeared with turmeric paste, sandalwood paste (in the form of a tilakam (insignia or mark) and kumkumam (vermillion). Then, in the evening, previous to the puja day, they are placed on an earmarked platform and decorated with flowers. In the case of weapons of war, they are also cleaned, bedecked with flowers and tilak and placed in a line, adjacent to a wall. On the morning of the puja that is on the Navami day, they are all worshipped along with the images of Saraswati, Lakshmi, and Parvati. Books and musical instruments are also placed on the pedestal for veneration. On the day of the puja, these are not to be disturbed. The day is spent in veneration and contemplation.

== Regional traditions ==
=== Karnataka ===
In Karnataka, the erstwhile Mysore state of the Maharajas of Mysore, the ancient Navaratri festival started as a family tradition within the precincts of the palace. The royal family performs the Ayudha Pooja as a part of the Navaratri, inside the palace grounds. The rituals observed are first to venerate the weapons on the Mahanavami day (ninth day), followed by “Kushmanda” (pumpkin in Sanskrit)– the tradition of breaking a pumpkin in the palace grounds. After this, weapons are carried in a golden palanquin to the Bhuvaneshwari temple for veneration. The tradition of the festival is traced to the Vijayanagara Empire (1336 A.D. to 1565 A.D.) when it became a Naada Habba (or people's festival). Raja Wodeyar I (1578–1617) who was viceroy to the Vijayanagara ruler, with his seat of power in Mysore, reintroduced the Vijayanagara practice of celebrating the Navaratri festival, in 1610 A.D. He set rules on how to celebrate the Navaratri with devotion and grandeur. After a gala nine days of durbar, the Maharaja performs a puja in a temple in the palace precincts, which is followed by a grand procession through the main thoroughfares of the Mysore city to the Bannimantap on a caparisoned elephant. The Bannimantap is the place where the Maharaja worships the traditional Shami or Banni Tree (Prosopis spicigera); the legend of this tree is traced to the Mahabharat legend of Arjuna (where he had hidden his weapons of war). The significance of the Shami tree veneration is to seek blessings of the tree (where Rama is also said to have worshipped) for success in the desired avocations (including war campaigns). This festival is also celebrated with lot of fanfare throughout the state, in all villages. In the rural areas, every village and community observe this festival with fervour but there have been conflicts on several occasions as to which community has the first right to perform the Pujas. Generally, the Ayudha puja in villages begins with the sacrifice of sheep and smearing the bullock carts with sheep blood.

=== Kerala ===
In Kerala, the festival is called Ayudha Puja or Saraswati Puja as part of the ten-day puja ceremonies, also named as the festival of autumnal equinox that is observed three weeks from the date of the equinox. The practice followed in the veneration on two days involves the opening day, which is called Pujaveppu (meaning: keeping implements for veneration). The closing day festival is called Pujayeduppu (meaning: taking implements back from veneration). On the Pujaveppu day, all tools, machines, and instruments, including vehicles, musical instruments, stationery and all implements that help one earn the livelihood, are worshipped. On the closing day, these are taken back for re-use. In villages in Kerala, the Ayudha puja is observed with great reverence and several martial art forms and folk dances are also performed on that day.

=== Tamil Nadu ===
In Tamil Nadu, golu is the festival celebrated during the Navaratri period. On this occasion dolls, predominantly that of the deities from Hinduism, are artistically arranged on a seven-stepped wooden platform. Traditionally, 'marapachi' wooden dolls representing Perumal and Thayar are also displayed together at a dominant location on the top step of the platform erected specially for the occasion. On the ninth day (Navami day), Saraswati puja is performed when special prayers are offered to the goddess Saraswati. Books and musical instruments are placed in the puja pedestal and worshipped. Tools are placed for the Ayudha puja. Vehicles are washed and decorated, and puja performed for them on this occasion. This is followed by the Vijayadashami celebrations at the culmination of the ten-day festivities.

=== Maharashtra ===
In Maharashtra, the festival is celebrated as Ayudha Puja/Shastra Puja, Vijayadashami, Navaratri and Saraswati Puja. All weapons, vehicles, agricultural equipment, machines and metal items are worshipped with leaves of the shami tree (Marathi: आपट्याची पाने/सोने), marigold flowers and the 'dhaan' that is grown during 9 days of Navaratri. Marigold flowers have a special significance on Navaratri day. Saraswati Puja is performed and books, musical instruments, etc. are worshiped alongside the goddess. People perform a ritual called Simollanghan, crossing boundary of the village and collect leaves of the apta tree. The leaves signify gold. People visit each other's homes in the evening and distribute the gold (leaves) as a mark of love and respect. Royal Navaratri celebrations take place at various places like Kolhapur.

== See also ==
- Kullu Dussehra – Popular festival celebrated in the state of Himachal Pradesh, India
- Saraswati – Principal Hindu goddess; goddess of knowledge, music, and speech
- Vidyarambham – Hindu rite of passage for young children
- Vijayadashami – Major Hindu festival
