= Golu (festival) =

Festive display of dolls in India

Tamil: Bommai kolu (பொம்மை கொலு) Telugu: Bommala Koluvu (బొమ్మల కొలువు) Kannada: Gombe Habba (ಗೊಂಬೆ ಹಬ್ಬ) Malayalam: Bommakkolu (ബൊമ്മക്കൊലു)
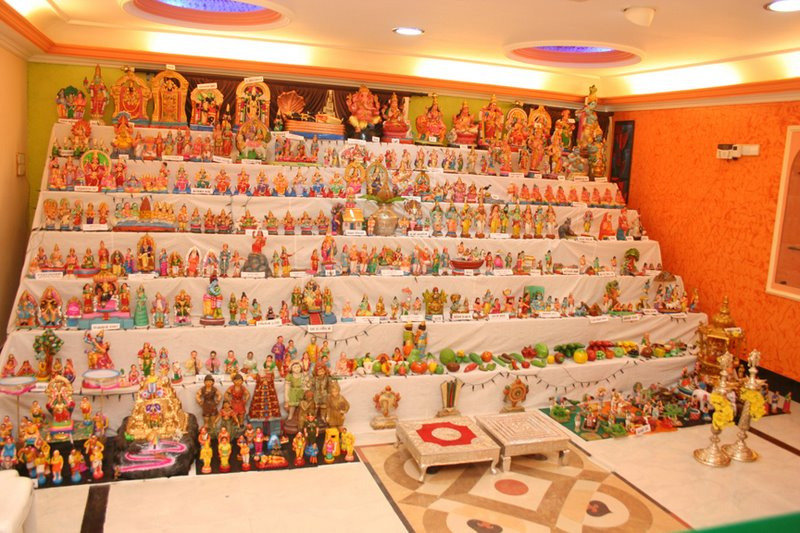
- Dasara dolls arrangement
- Observed by: Hindus of Tamil Nadu, Andhra Pradesh, Karnataka and few parts of Kerala
- Type: Hindu
- Observances: Story telling with dolls, family visiting
- Begins: Mahalaya
- Ends: Vijayadashami
- Related to: Navaratri

Golu is the festive display of dolls and figurines in South India during the autumn festive season, particularly around the multiday Navaratri (Dussehra, Dasara) festival of Hinduism. These displays are typically thematic, narrating a legend from a Hindu text to court life, weddings, everyday scenes, and miniature kitchen utensils. They are also known as Golu, Gombe Habba, Bommai golu, or Bommala Koluvu.

Each displayed item in a golu display is sometimes called a golu doll or equivalent. These are typically made by rural artisans from clay and wooden materials then brightly painted. They are generally arranged in an odd number of padis (tiers or steps) to tell a story. Goddess-related themes are common, along with developments such as anticipated wedding within the family and of friends. During the golu display season, families and neighbors visit each other with gifts to view and chit-chat over the golu display, share festive foods, and sometimes play music or sing devotional songs together. Major Hindu temples such as the Meenakshi Temple in Madurai, arrange elaborate golu displays each year for Navaratri.

== Etymology ==
Bommai golu in Tamil means doll decoration. Bommala Koluvu in Telugu means court of toys and Gombe Habba means doll festival in Kannada. It is a part of the annual Dasara-Vijayadasami Hindu festival where young girls and women display dolls, figurine, court life, everyday scenes along with the divine presence of the goddesses Saraswati, Parvati and Lakshmi in the Tamil, Kannada, and Telugu households during Navaratri, the nine nights.

== Description ==
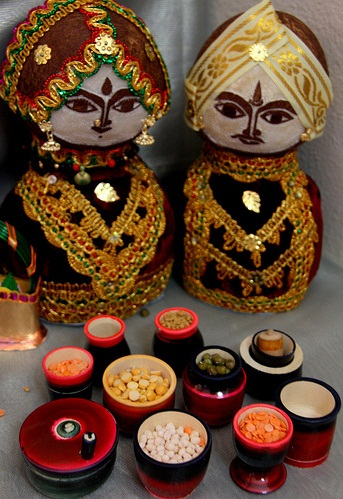
Traditional bride and groom dolls made from dry coconut at homes, Karnataka.

On the first day of Navaratri, following Ganapati puja, a welcoming ritual is performed for goddesses Saraswati, Durga, and Lakshmi by a Hindu ritual called Kalasa Aavahanam which is performed by an elderly male or female of the family at an auspicious time (muhurtam). This is then followed by building a rack of odd-numbered shelves of golu (or Padi) (usually 3, 5, 7, 9, or 11), set up using wooden planks. After the steps have been covered with fabric it is then adorned with various dolls, figurines and toys according to their size, with the deities at the top.

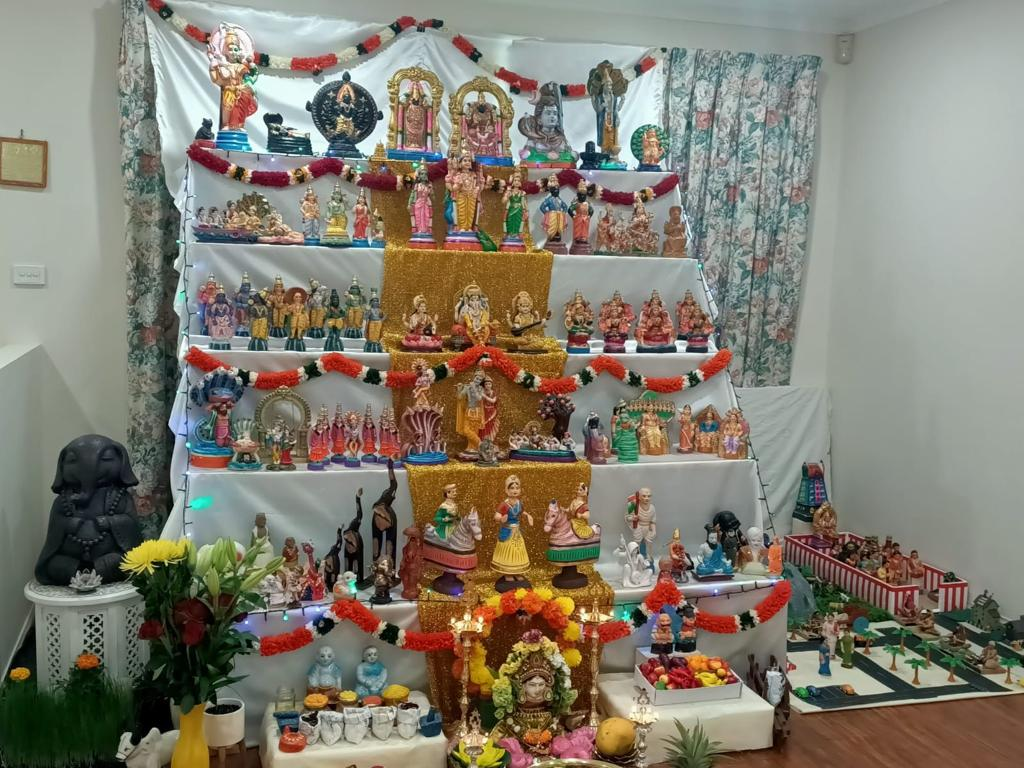
Traditional golu Display in Melbourne, Australia

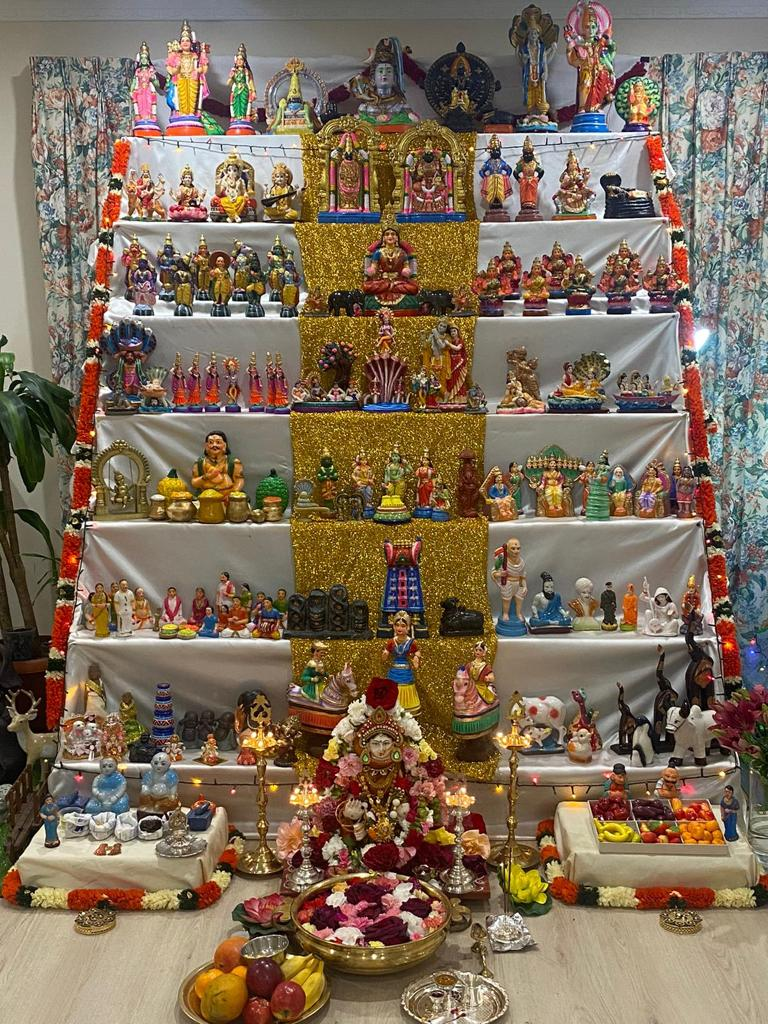
7 Steps Golu in Melbourne, Australia 2023

The dolls are predominantly displayed with depictions from Hindu mythological texts, court life, royal procession, ratha yatra, weddings, baby showers, everyday scenes, miniature kitchen utensils, anything a little girl would have played with. It is a traditional practice to have wooden figurines of the bride and groom together, called 'Marapacchi Bommai' or 'Pattada Gombe', usually made of sandalwood, teak or rosewood or dried coconut and decorated with new clothes each year before being displayed on the golu. In southern India, bride is presented with 'Marapacchi Bommai' during the wedding by her parents as part of wedding trousseau to initiate the yearly tradition of 'Navaratri golu' in her new home with her husband. These dolls come as couples dressed in their wedding attire, depicting husband and wife symbolizing prosperity and fertility and the start of the bride's golu collection. Display figurines are passed on from one generation to another as heirloom, and are often several generations old. In the old Kingdom of Mysore, 'Pattada Gombe' is also believed to be a tribute to the kings of the Wodeyar dynasty who ruled of the region for around 600 years.

In the evenings, women within the neighborhood invite each other to visit their homes to view the golu displays; they also exchange gifts and sweets. A Kuthuvilakku lamp is lit, in the middle of a decorated rangoli, while devotional hymns and shlokas are chanted. After performing the puja, the food items that have been prepared are offered to the Goddess and then to the guests. The first 3 days of the festival are dedicated to Durga, then the next 3 days dedicated to Lakshmi and finally, the last 3 days are dedicated to Saraswati.

On the 9th day, Saraswati Puja, special pujas are offered to goddess Saraswati. Books and musical instruments are placed in the puja and worshipped as a source of knowledge.

The 10th day, Vijayadashami, is regarded by some to be the most auspicious day of all. It was the day Hindus believe the asura Mahishasura was finally destroyed by Durga. It is regarded to mark a new and prosperous beginning. Later, on the evening of Vijayadashami, one of the doll from the display is symbolically put to sleep, and the Kalasha is moved a bit towards North to mark the end of that year's Navaratri golu display. Prayers are offered to thank deities for the successful completion of that year's Navaratri festival and with hope of a successful one the next year. Then the steps are dismantled and the dolls are packed up for the next year.

== History ==
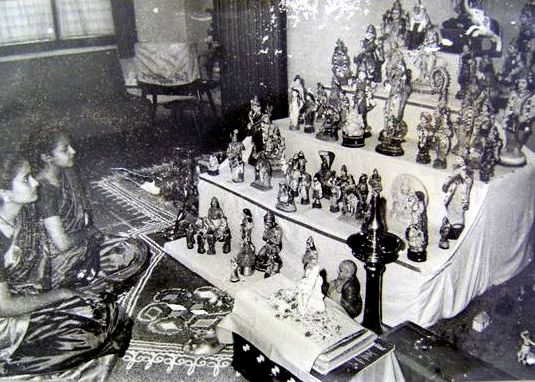
A Bommala Koluvu dolls display at a Telugu household in the early 1950s.

The practice of golu appeared in current day Karnataka, where it is closely associated with the royal Navaratri celebrations under the Vijayanagara monarchy, during which the golu likely appeared, then the Nayakas and Polygars states, who spread it in Andhra Pradesh and Tamil Nadu. The Navaratri, then called Mahanavami, were state celebrations during which royalty, through numerous secular and religious rituals, renewed its alliances with its vassals, established its prestige among its subjects and beyond borders, and legitimized the exercise of its power. For Vasudha Narayanan, it is these very opulent celebrations that influenced the practice of golu in the households of the southern Deccan, where the ordering of society is reproduced, like the ordering of dignitaries and spectators at the Durbar (see the Mahanavami Dibba at Hampi).

In some parts of Andhra Pradesh, there is a still followed tradition of displaying a golu also during the celebrations of Makara Sankranti (in January), which takes the name saṅkrānti bommala koluvu (సంక్రాంతి బొమ్మల కొలువు) in Telugu. This custom is explained by the fact that Navaratri is a period which occurs four times during the year, one per season, including the Magha Gupta Navaratri (or Winter Navaratri). In present-day Tamil Nadu, there is also a rare tradition of installing the golu at Gokulashtami among the Khedawals. A small community of Gujarati Brahmins who migrated to the region from the 18th century, and adopted local cultural aspects.

Bommala koluvu has become an element of South Indian ethos, especially of the heir states of the Vijayanagara and Nayak era (Karnataka, Tamil Nadu and Andhra Pradesh). The association of Navaratri with the celebration of kingship and power during the Vijayanagara period, resulted in many festivities which are still perpetuated. These related celebrations include the Dasara of Mysore or the Navaratri of Ramnad.

=== Tamil Nadu ===
In Tamil Nadu, the exhibition of golu is an attested practice at the court of the kings of Tanjore and Pudukkottai. The Tanjore Palace golu is said to have featured figurines representing up to 18 different castes or social groups.

However, it was not until the end of the 19th century that golu spread among the commoner population far from the royal courts and their influence. This diffusion occurred independently of these royal courts and regions, from the Madrasian bourgeoisie of upper castes background (Chettiars, Iyers, Iyengars, etc.), who probably adopted this practice from the Canarese and Telugu communities of the city. As a result, golu has long been associated with the affluent high and upper middle classes people of urban and upper castes. A socio-cultural marker wrongly presented as exclusive to Tamil Brahmins (a certain number of whose households do not have this practice, which is told to be "absent from their habits"), but more adequate when about the Hindu bourgeoisie of 20th century Madras (composed with a significant proportion of Brahmins). Since then, golu has experienced a continuous and even wider diffusion, particularly in line with logic of social mobility among the urban middle and working classes. Many major temples in the state organize exhibitions of golus, and many public places and communities now install them. However, golu is still far from being a systematic feature in Tamil Nadu households, with the practice yet to become a part of the habits of many, and more common in some communities households. A socio-cultural characteristic of golu practice which is reportedly absent in Karnataka.

With its modern reintroduction in a context far removed from the monarchy, the practice of Golu took on a purely religious dimension in Tamil Nadu, where Koluvu has no apparent links with royalty, and is rather a miniature reproduction of the world, of the totality, and its consecration to the Devi, from whom protection is sought.

The votive practice of golu among the Hindus of Tamil Nadu has also been documented by a number of researchers. Many people, who sometimes don't install a golu at home, offer particular figurines or entire sets of golu to temples as ex-voto offerings. These votive figurines are also installed in domestic golus, following prayers fulfillment.

== Significance ==
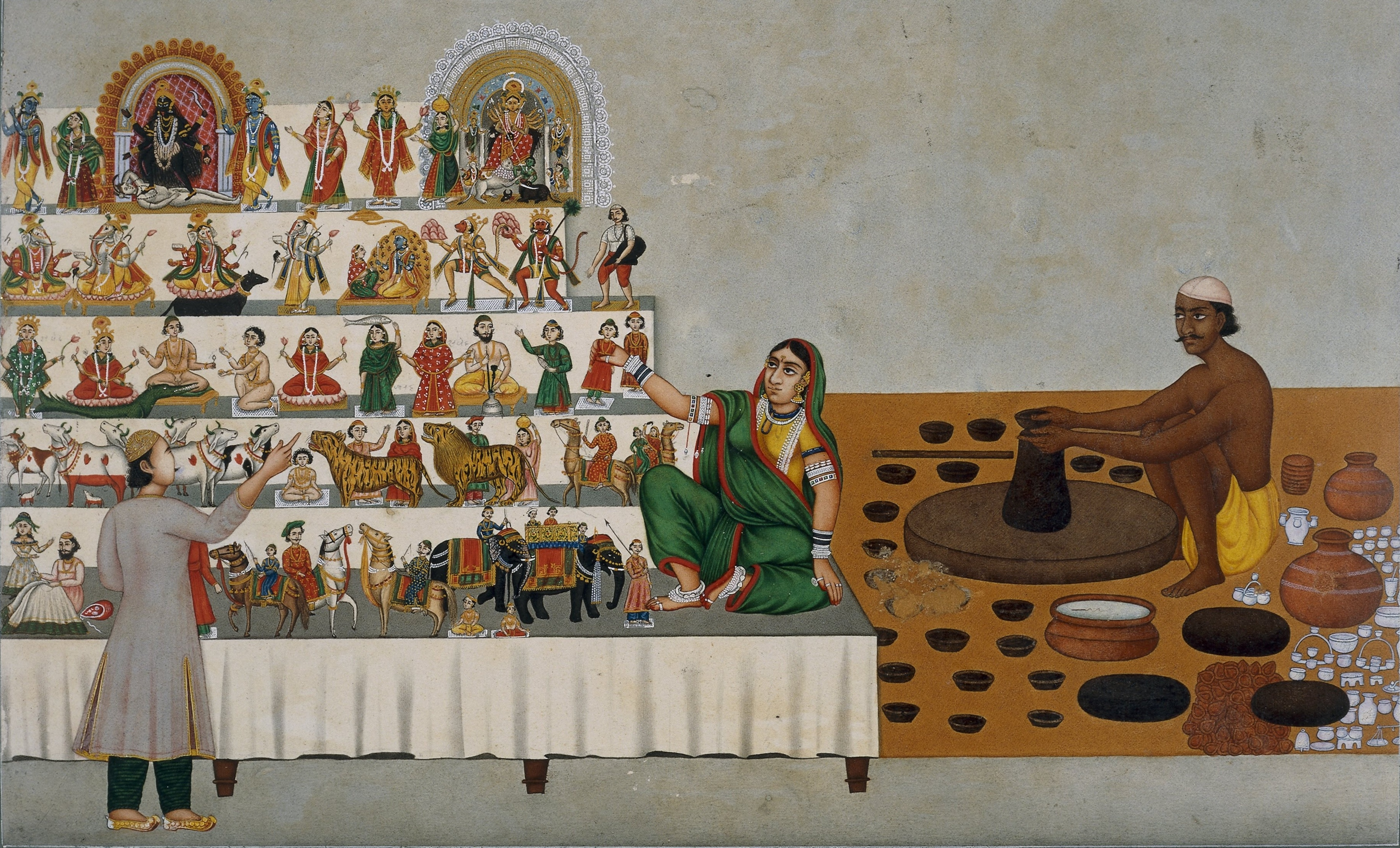
A potter and a stall for the sale of painted figures. A painting of the Patna School of Company style, made by Shiva Dayal Lal in 1870.

Golu also has a significant connection with the agricultural and handicrafts professions in India. Besides the economic aspect of the festival, it is an important occasion for socializing. During this season relatives and friends in south India make it a point to visit each other's homes. This is also a very important occasion that promotes creative expression for women and for the family to work together on an aesthetic aspect. These days, the golu dolls are made from either clay or paper mache, with the latter being light in weight. Some dolls also depict various freedom fighters of the Indian Independence Movement and characters like Spider-Man and Superman considering the need to cater to the younger audience. Some people use collapsible steps, which are easy to install.

In relation to the practice of Golu at the Court of Tanjore, there was a royal patronage of arts and crafts, including pottery and clay work, which notably enabled the creation of Tanjore dolls (the best known is the Tanjorean nautch or dancer lady with bobbling head). These terracota and pulp dolls appeared under the reign of Serfoji II and are today commonly exhibited in golus. Beyond Thanjavur, the practice of Bommala koluvu has contributed to the creation or preservation of many other forms of traditional and ancient crafts, such as woodworking in Kondapalli (Kondapalli toys, known peculiarly for its Dasavatara series) and Tirupati (Tirupati toys) in Andhra Pradesh or Channapatna (Channapatna toys) in Karnataka, which are three other localities known for their equally sought-after craftsmanship of wooden figurines and toys to decorate doll courts. It has also been an excellent outlet for many communities of artisans in southern India, who had more difficulty making a living from their expertise, which was less sought after in an industrialised society. Such as in Vilacheri, on the outskirt of Madurai in Southern Tamil Nadu, where local potters, who notably made terracotta horses (puravi) for the worship of Ayyanar, retrained in making koluvu figurines around the 1960s, and have since been recognized in their new field of work. Panruti, in Northern Tamil Nadu, is also an other area renowned for its golu dolls crafting.

In Tamil Nadu, the growth of the practice of Golu also accompanied that of the Nativity scene. Like the Golu, the practice of the Christmas Crib was for a long time limited to the wealthy social strata of South Indian Christians (especially the Catholics) and to the churches. With urbanisation and the spread of cultural practices and consumption patterns hitherto restricted to the affluent social classes, demand for Christmas crib figures has risen sharply. This demand is also satisfied by the craftsmen who make Golu figurines.

== Gallery ==
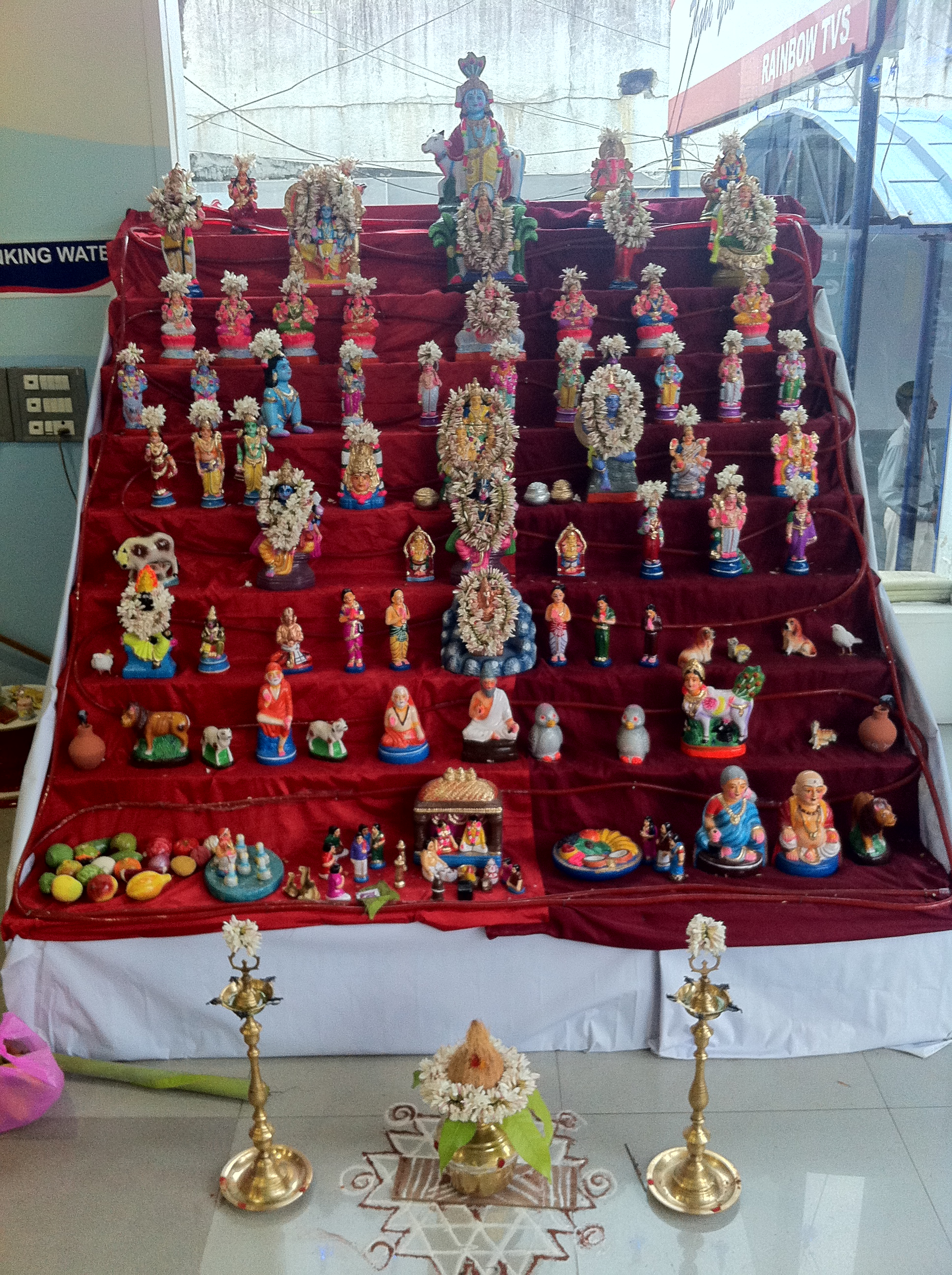
Navarathri Golu in Tamil Nadu

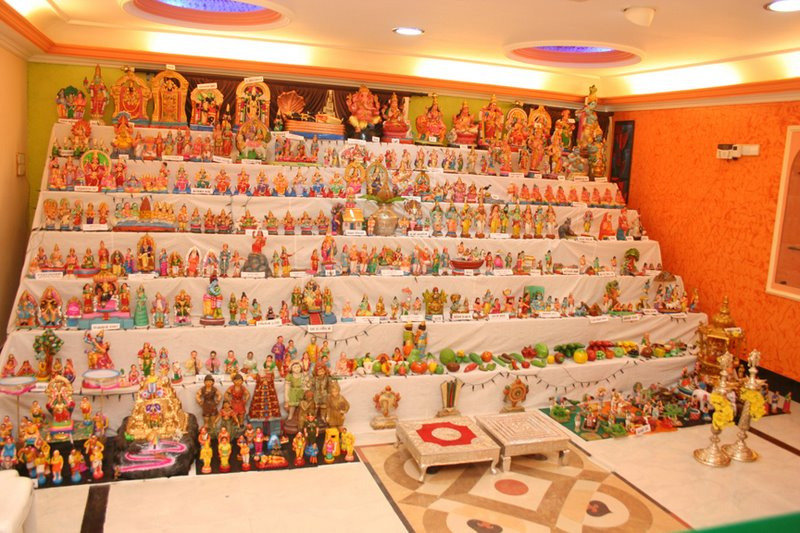
Navarathri Golu display.

Display of the Navratri Golu in seven steps in Tamil Nadu

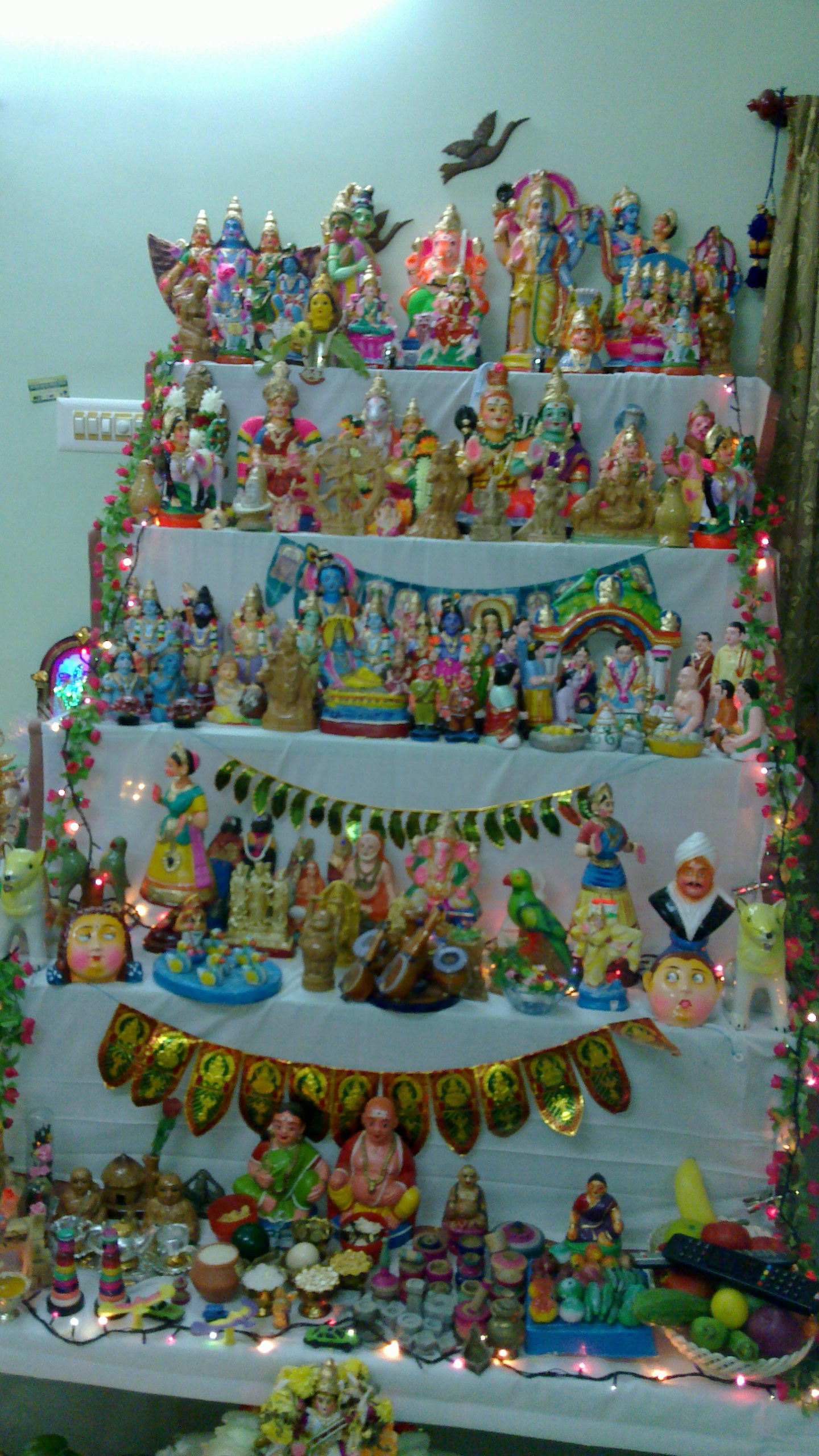
Navarathri Golu

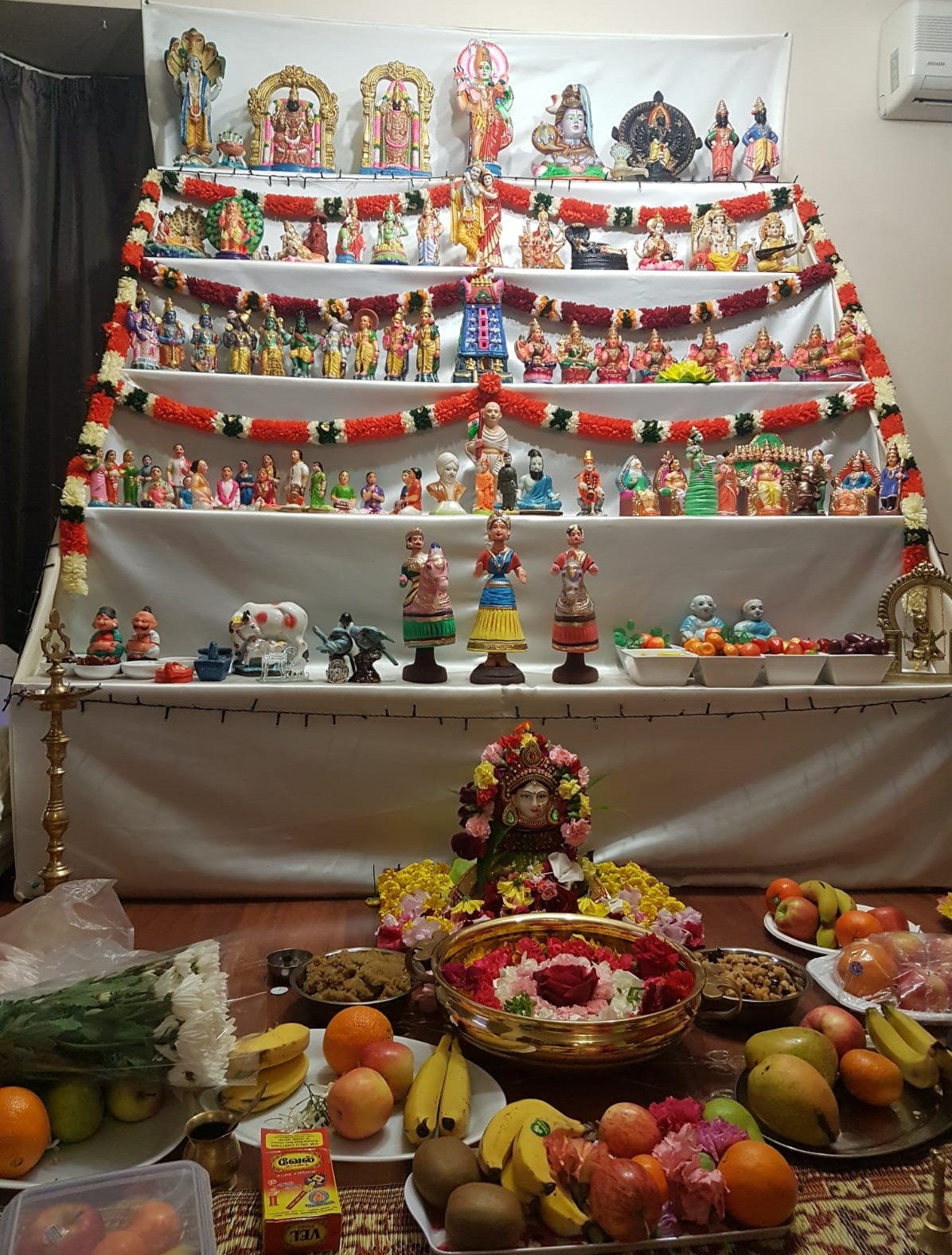
Display of Navarathri Golu in Melbourne, Australia

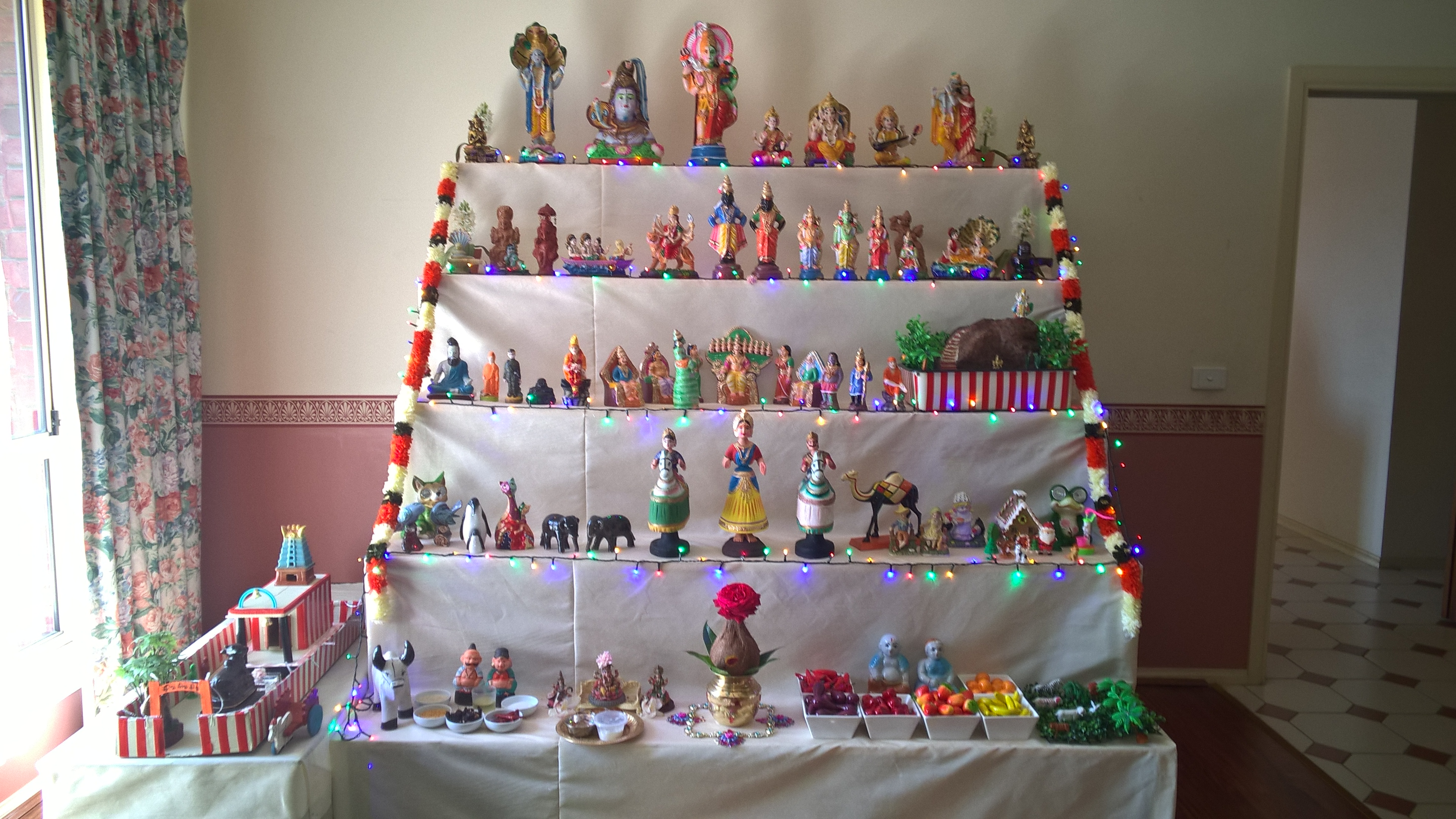
Temple village Golu display in Melbourne, Australia

A Makar Sankranti Bommala Koluvu displayed in a Telugu household.

Golu in Melbourne Australia 2026

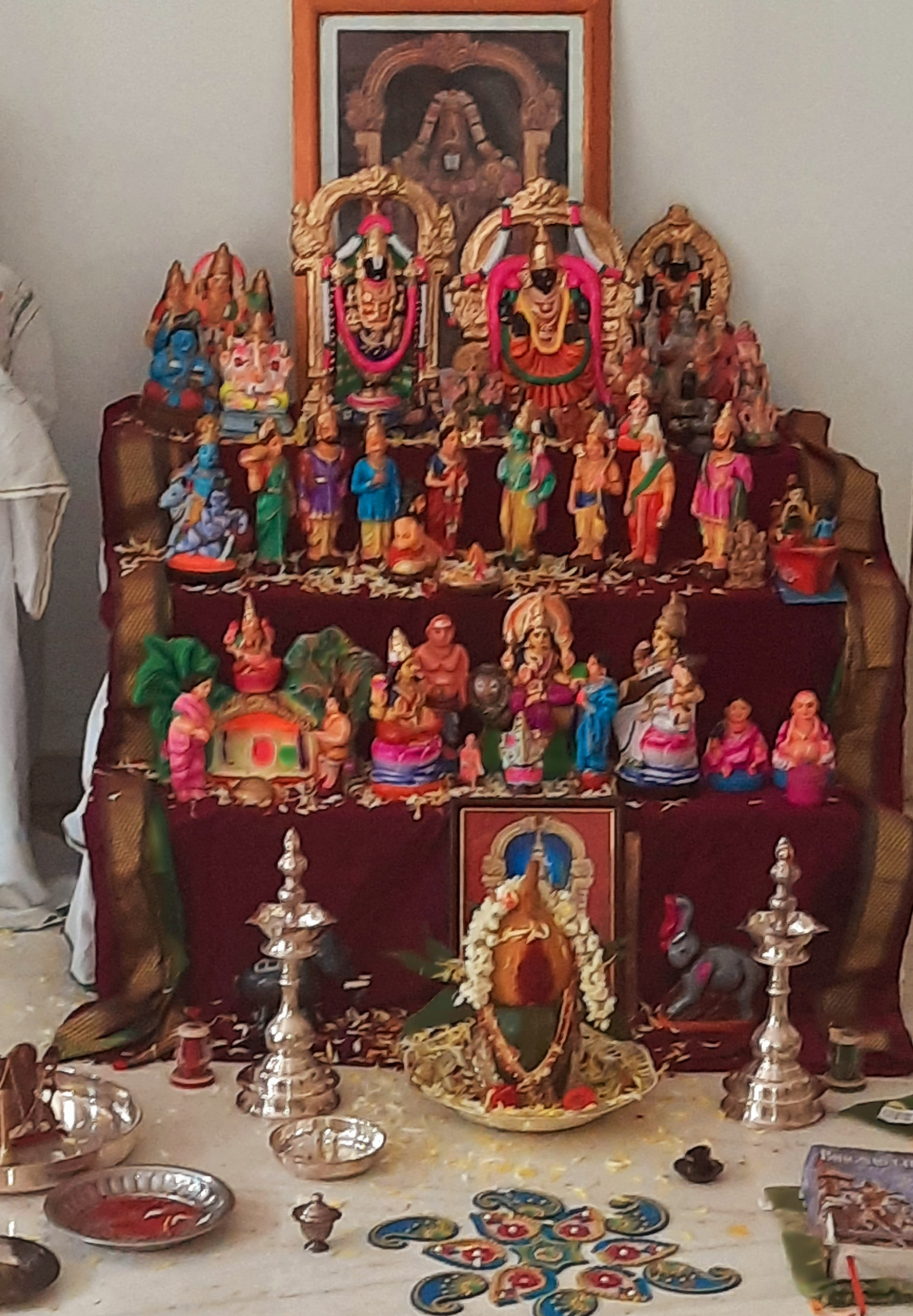
A Vishnu-prominent Golu exhibition.

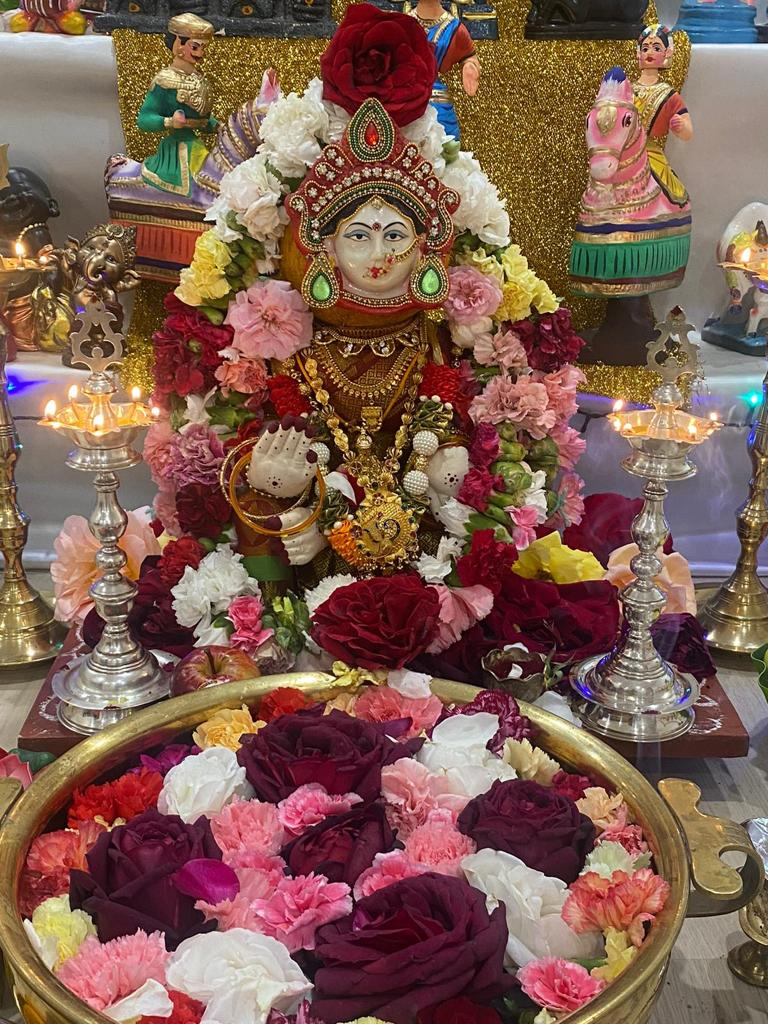
Golu in Melbourne Australia 2026

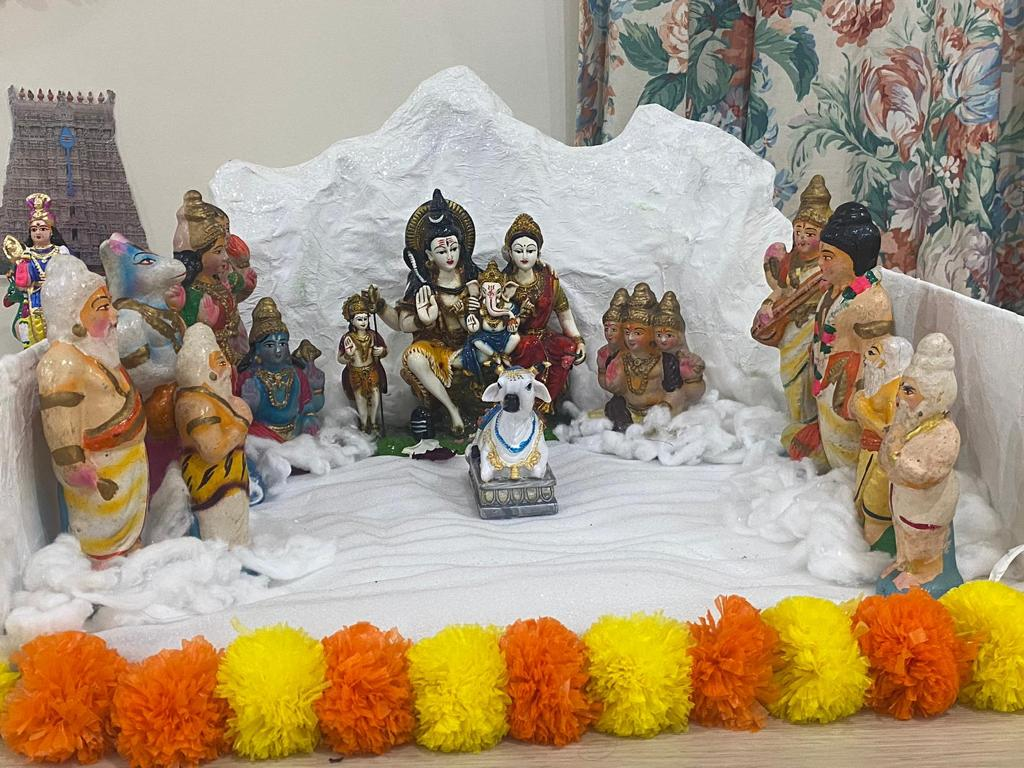
Kailasam in Golu Melbourne Australia 2023

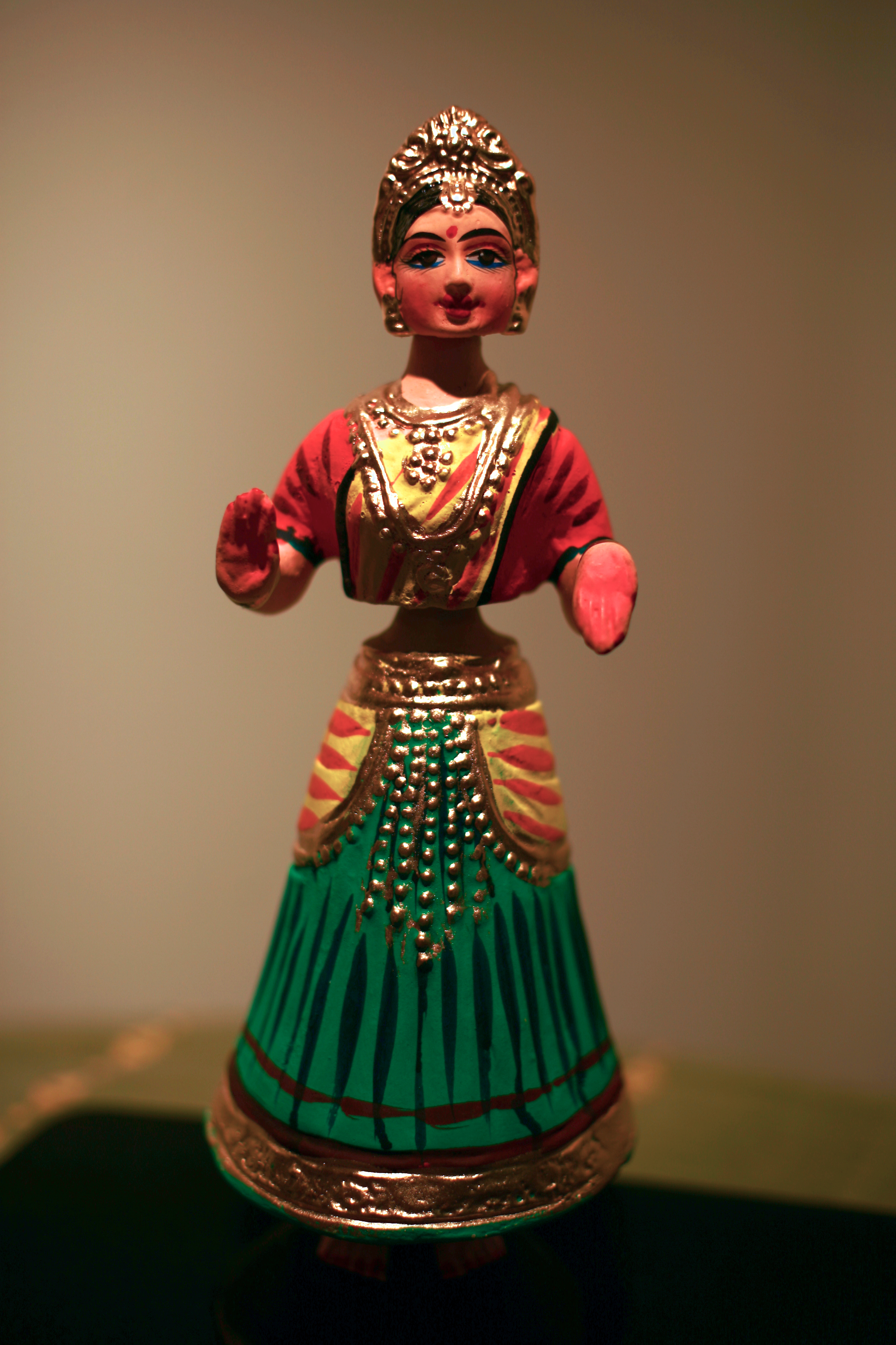
A dancing Golu doll from Thanjavur

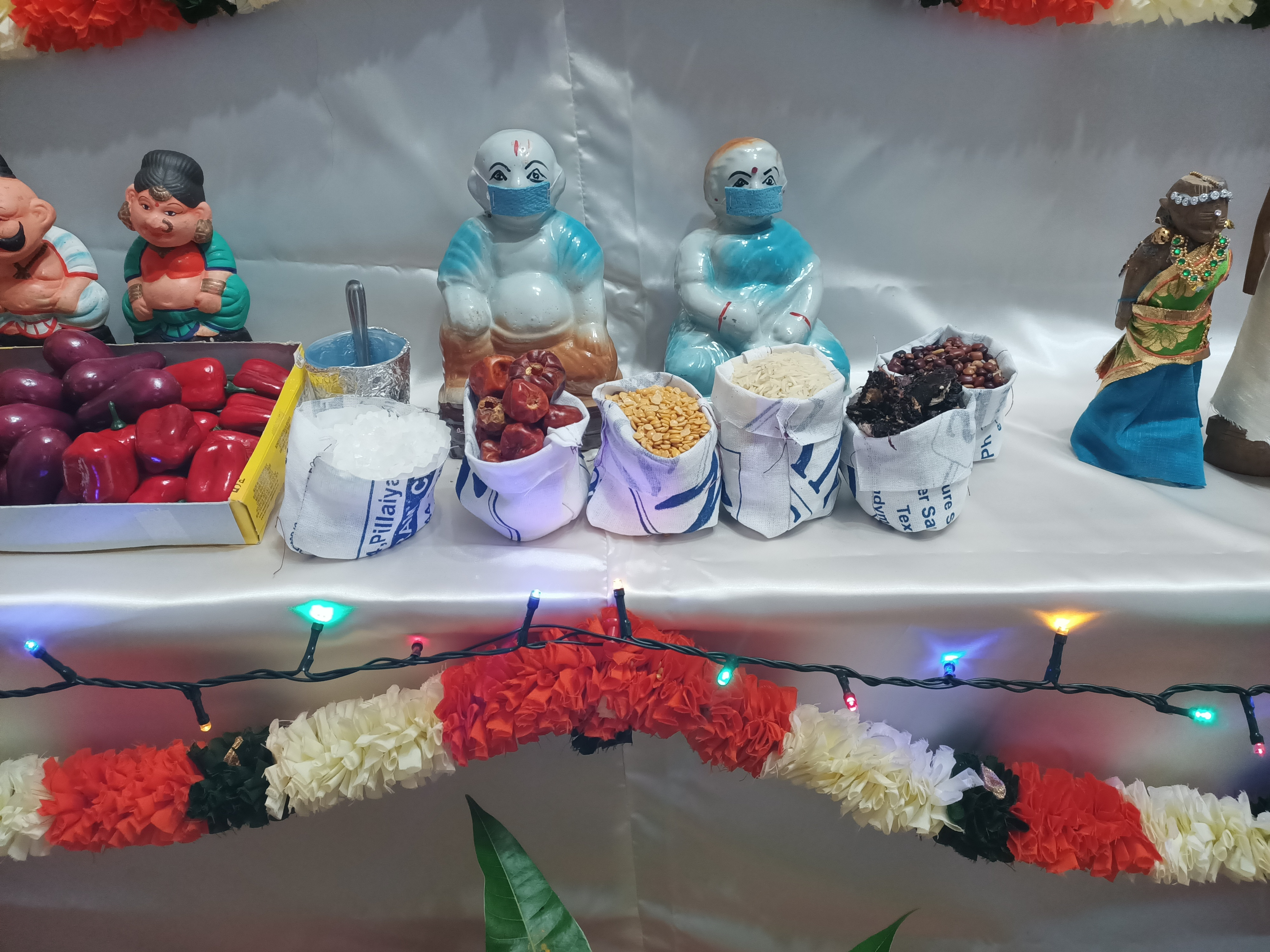
Trader with mask showing COVID-19 safety in Golu display, Melbourne, Australia

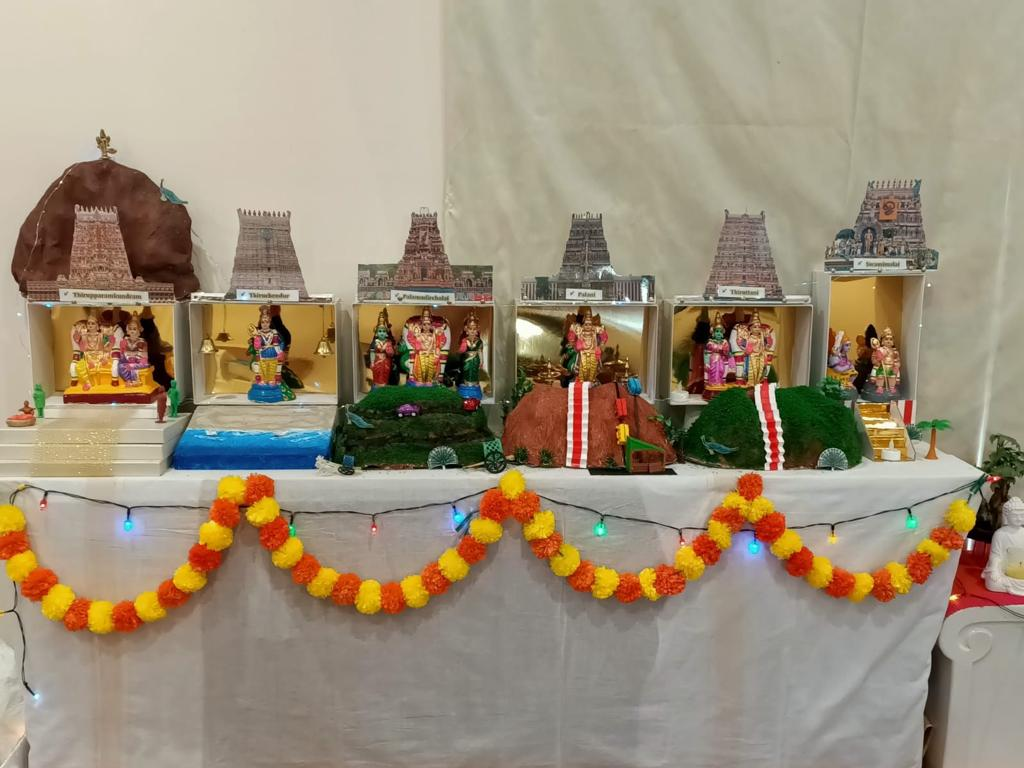
A thematic Golu exhibition based on the Arupadai Veedu (Six sanctuaries of Muruga), in Melbourne, Australia.

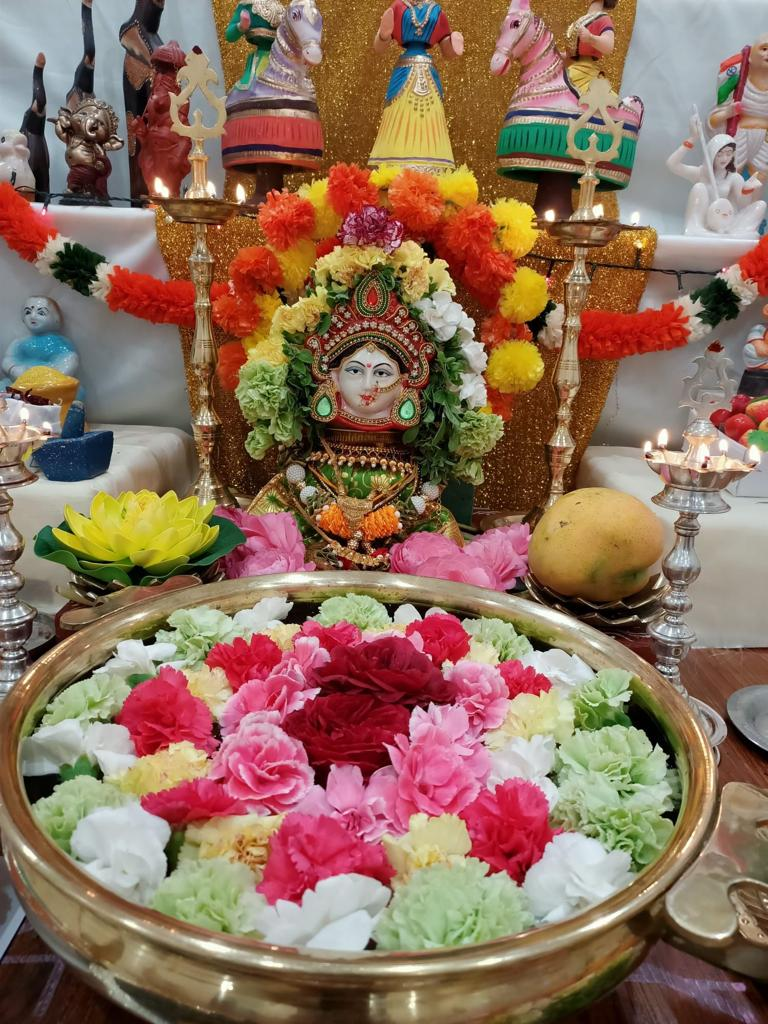
Kalasam in Golu, Melbourne, Australia

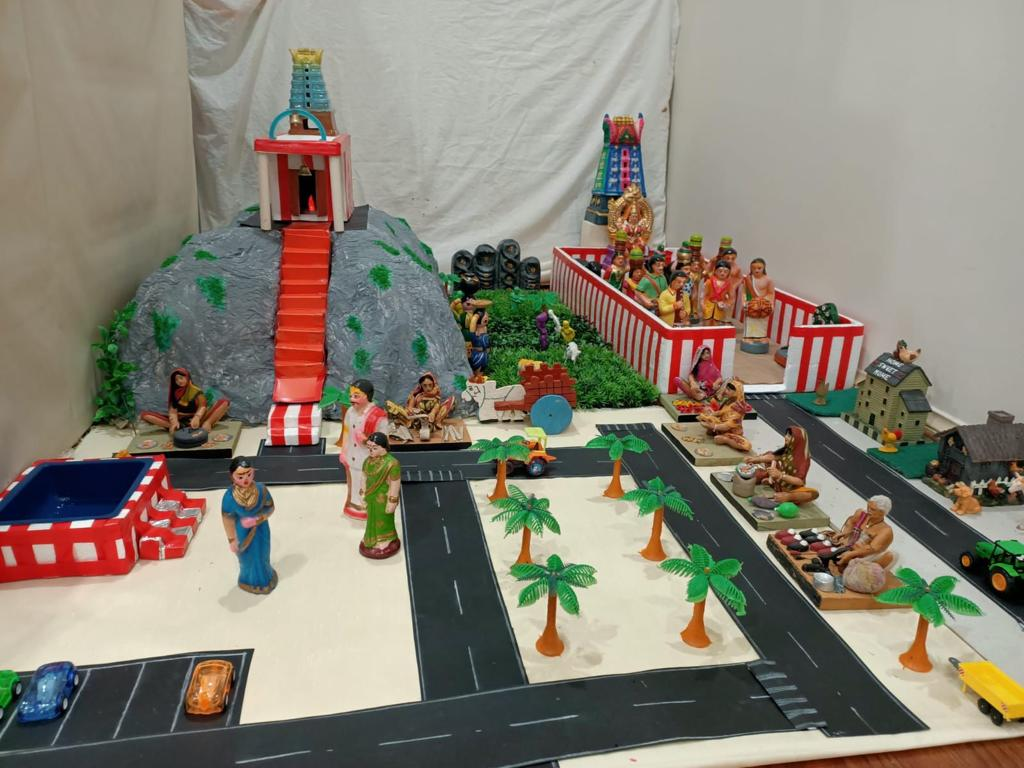
Temple and village in Golu, Melbourne, Australia

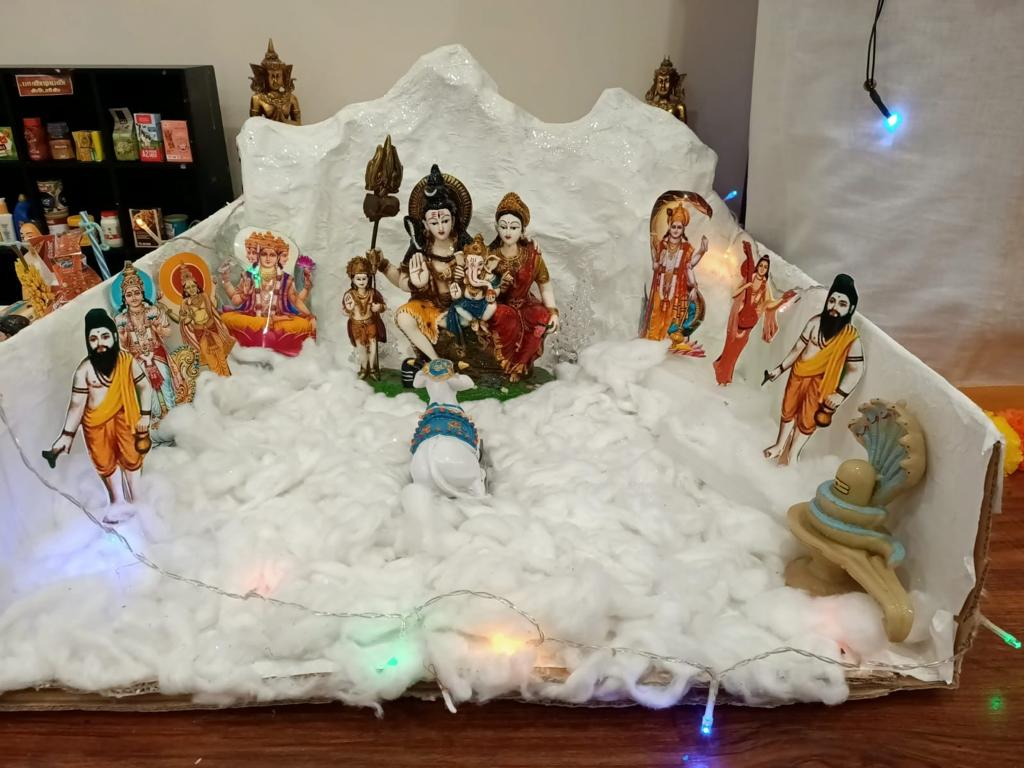
Kailasa in Golu, Melbourne, Australia

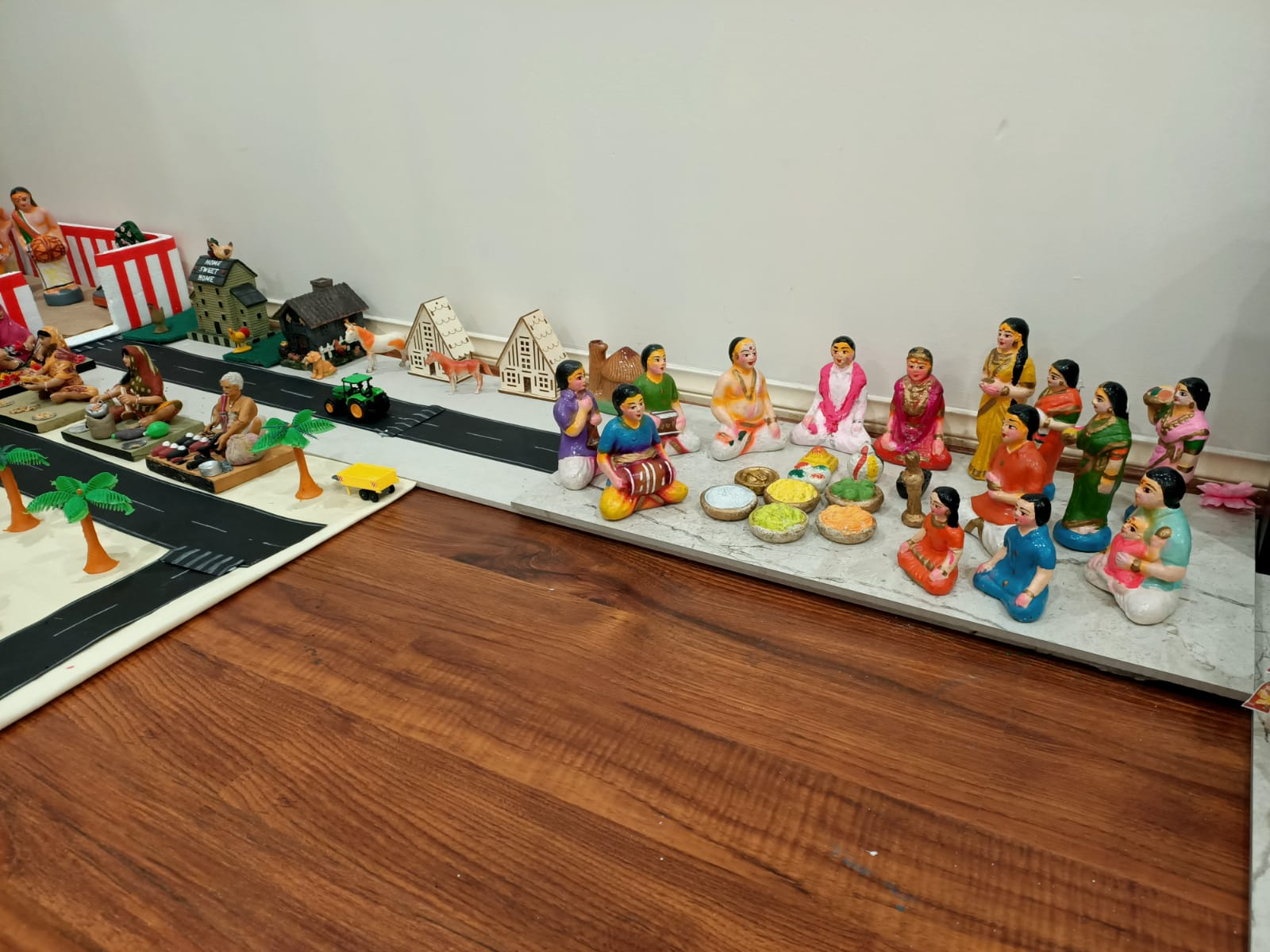
South Indian wedding set up in Golu, Melbourne, Australia

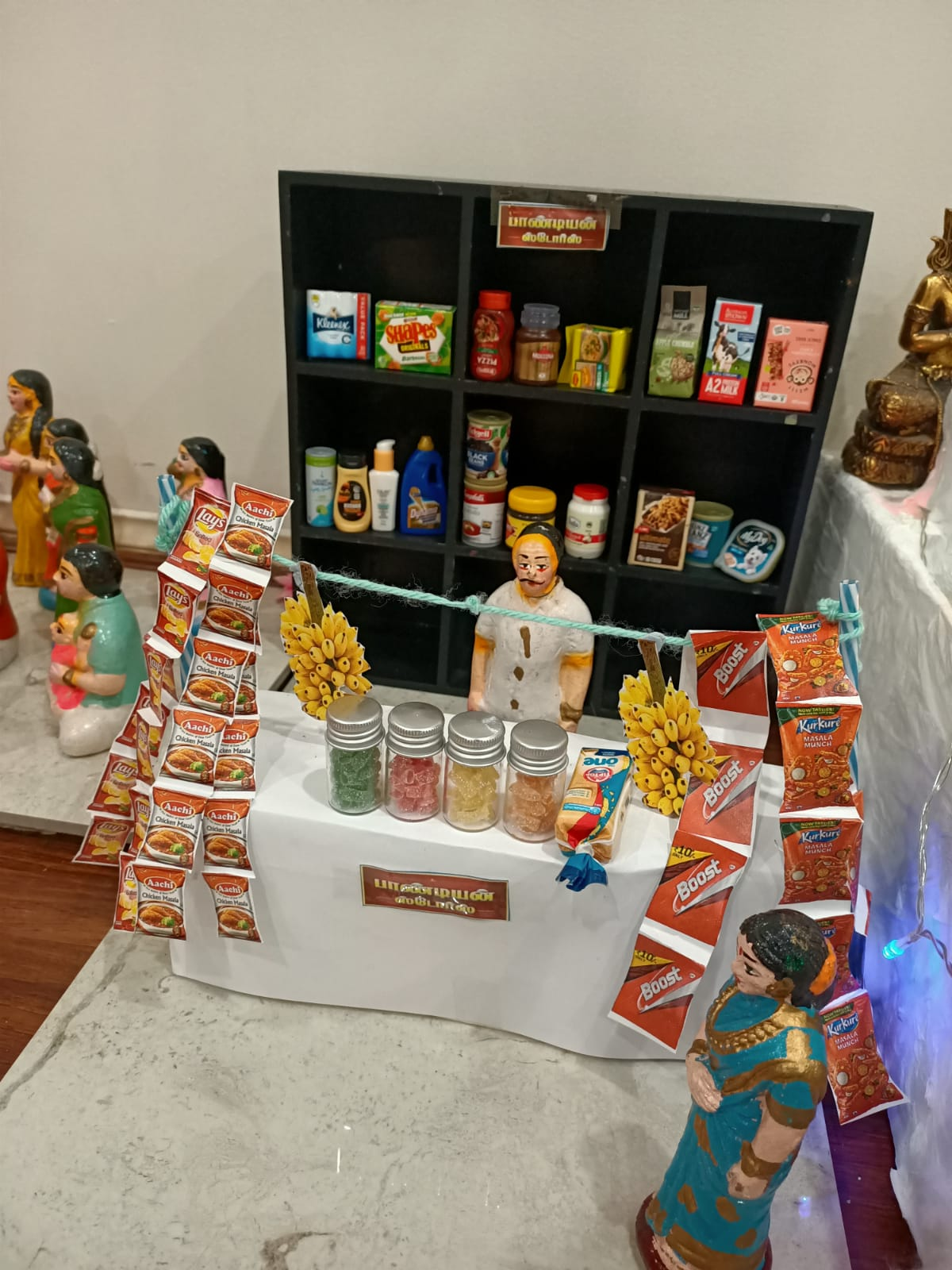
South Indian shop (potti kadai or kirana) set up in Golu, Melbourne, Australia

Figurine of Gadothgajan, a character from Mahabharata.

== See also ==
- Navaratri
- Vijayadashami
- Hinamatsuri
- Marapachi Dolls
