= Ras Mala =

1856 historical work by Alexander Kinloch Forbes

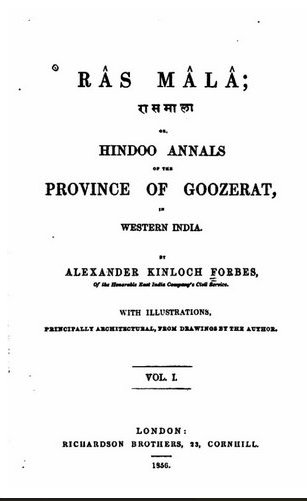
- First edition title page, Volume 1, 1856
- Author: Alexander Kinloch Forbes
- Language: English
- Genre: History
- Publication date: 1856
- Publication place: India

Râs Mâlâ: Hindoo Annals of the Province of Goozerat, in Western India is an 1856 historical work by British colonial administrator Alexander Kinloch Forbes. Divided in two volumes, the work has four sections documenting the history and chronicles from 8th century Gujarat (now in India) to arrival of British and folk literature of Gujarat as well as an historical account of the place and people he came to know during his stay in Gujarat. It was later translated into Gujarati in 1869.

== Origin ==
Alexander Kinloch Forbes (1821–1865), a British colonial administrator, appointed in 1842 came to Ahmedabad as an assistant judge in 1846 where he began to learn Gujarati language first from Bhogilal Pranavallabh, and then from Dalpatram, a Gujarati poet. Forbes also had a deep interest in archaeology, ancient monuments and manuscripts, which made him intensely interested in the old archaeological and historical remains of Gujarat.

Forbes, along with his colleagues, established Gujarat Vernacular Society in 1848. Dalpatram was associated with Forbes since the establishment of Gujarat Vernacular Society and they became close friends. Dalpatram became instrumental, assistant guide and interpreter for Forbes in his attempt to draw the history of the province. Forbes furnished Dalpatram with necessary assistance to travel extensively and collect the chronicles and inscription from different parts of the province. Dalpatram had profound knowledge of Braj Bhasha and Charani dialect, which were popular languages in poetry gatherings at that time. Thus, Dalpatram helped Forbes to map the province and to give an outline of native world view, life style of local people.

Forbes arranged a Kavi Melo (a gathering of poets) at the court of Maharaja Yuvansinha of Idar State in the month of Dussera festival in 1852, and invited Charan poets and other local bards. He inquired of these poets about the history, life practices of the people, language, different rulers, great people of the past, traditions of their region, and recorded it for Ras Mala. He also visited many Jain libraries in search of bards who told the stories of history of Gujarat.

== Publication history ==
In 1854, Forbes left for England, and returned to India in 1856 and published Ras Mala.

In the subtitle of the work Forbes uses the word annals, in a fashion that is used by James Tod in his Annals and Antiquities of Rajasthan (1829 and 1832). A brief memoir on Forbes, prepared by A. K. Nairne, appeared in the 1878 edition of Ras Mala. Ras Mala was translated by Ranchhodbhai Udayaram Dave into Gujarati, and was published by Forbes Gujarati Sabha in 1869 as Gujaratna Ketlak Aitihasik Prasango Ane Vartao.

== Content ==
The Ras Mala has two volumes; each volume is divided into two books. The text contains illustrations, principally architectural, prepared by Forbes himself.

The Ras Mala starts with a description of natural boundaries of Gujarat as viewed by Forbes. The first book gives an account of the rise and fall of the Chavada and Vaghela dynasties. It covers the period from about the eighth to thirteenth century. The second book gives an account of the conquest of Muslims over Anhilwad, a capital of Chavda and Vaghela kings, and the political conflicts between Muslims and Hindu rulers. The third book describes the rise of Maratha power in the province and its fall with the arrival of the British. The fourth book, entitled Conclusions, gives an outline of the life practices of the people of the province: it describes the Hindu castes, Hindu beliefs, religious services and festivals, land tenures under Muslim rulers, Marathas and the British rule, marriage institution, funeral rites, etc.

== Reception and criticism ==
In the introduction of the 1878 edition, J. W. Watson serving at the Rajkot as the British Resident, noted, "There are few other books of reference about Goozerat [Gujarat], and none of them so encyclopaedic in character." H. G. Rawlinson, an historian who introduced a new edition of Ras Mala in 1924, called the book "a work for all time". Ras Mala is often compared with James Tod's Annals and Antiquities of Rajasthan and James Grant Duff's A History of the Mahrattas.
