= Ranchhodbhai Dave =

Gujarati playwright, producer and translator

Ranchhodbhai Udayaram Dave (9 August 1837 – 9 April 1923) was a Gujarati playwright, producer and translator. He is considered the father of modern Gujarati theatre and plays in Gujarati literature.

== Biography ==
He was born on 9 August 1837 in a Khedawal Brahmin family in Mahudha near Nadiad (now in Gujarat, India). He completed his primary education in Mahudha and moved to Nadiad in 1852 to study in English. He joined Law Class in Ahmedabad in 1857. He initially worked in Collector Office in Ahmedabad and later joined M/s Lawrence Company in Bombay in 1863 (now Mumbai) as a representative of Bahechardas Ambaidas, a businessman from Ahmedabad. He also worked as a representative of Gondal, Palanpur and Idar states in Bombay. He befriended Mansukhram Tripathi there. He was awarded Huzoor Assistant by Khengarji III of Cutch State and later appointed a minister (Diwan). He retired in 1904. He was the president of Gujarati Sahitya Parishad in the year 1912 in Vadodara. He was awarded Dewan Bahadur by British Government in 1915. He died on 9 April 1923 following brief illness of brain fever.

His oil painting is placed in the library of Arts & Commerce College at Mahudha.

== Works ==
Dave was not happy with the adult-comedy being performed in traditional-folk Gujarati play form called Bhavai. So he decided to come up with pure and sober Gujarati plays. He had written ten original and four adapted plays from Sanskrit literature. He borrowed from Sanskrit plays and also used mythological themes. He wrote plays on social and moral issues and some of these plays were performed in Bombay by Parsi theatre which caught attention of people. He first published his play Jaykumari-Vijay (1864) in Gujarati monthly Buddhiprakash in serialized manner. It is considered as the first modern love-story of Gujarati. It featured an educated female protagonist. It became very popular in Gujarat. Lalita Dukh Darsak (1866) is a great example of his themes and his ability to address social reforms in his work. It was about an educated girl marrying an illiterate boy and thus passing through social and emotional trial which at the end result in his death. It became very popular and people shed tears at the performance. Nandan, the name of the illiterate boy, became synonymous for a heartless rake. He also wrote mythological play called Harishchandra (1871) which was seen and lauded by Mahatma Gandhi. His other plays are Taramatiswayamvar (1871), Premrai Ane Charumati (1876), Bhanasur Madmardan (1878), Madalasa ane Hritudhwaj (1878), Nala-Damatanti (1893), Nindya Shringarnishedhak Roopak (1920), Verno Vanse Vashyo Varso (1922), Vanthel Virhana Kunda Krutyo (1923). He formed a drama troupe and produced plays to differentiate from Parsi theatre.

His works on prosody in three volumes Rannpingal (1902, 1905, 1907) are noteworthy. His essays are collected in Arogyasuchak (1859), Kul Vishe Nibandh (1867) and Natyaprakash (1990).

His other works are Santoshsurtaru (1866), Prastavik Kathasangrah (1866), Padshahi Rajniti (1890). Yuropianono Purvapradesh Aadi Sathe Vyapar Vol. I, IV, III (1916), II (1915), V (1918) are works on business.

He translated Rasmala Vol I, II (1870, 1892), the history from 8th century to arrival of British and folk literature of Gujarat by Alexander Kinloch Forbes, in Gujarati in 1869. His translations from Sanskrit plays include Malvikagnimitra (1870), Vikramorvarshiya-trotak (1868), Ratnavali (1889) as well as Gujarati Hitopadesh (1889), Laghusiddhantkaumudi (1874). He was member of Shakespeare Katha Samaj. He translated Shakespeare Katha Samaj (1878) and Barthold (1865) from English.

== See also ==
- List of Gujarati-language writers
