= Marapachi Dolls =

Indian wooden dolls

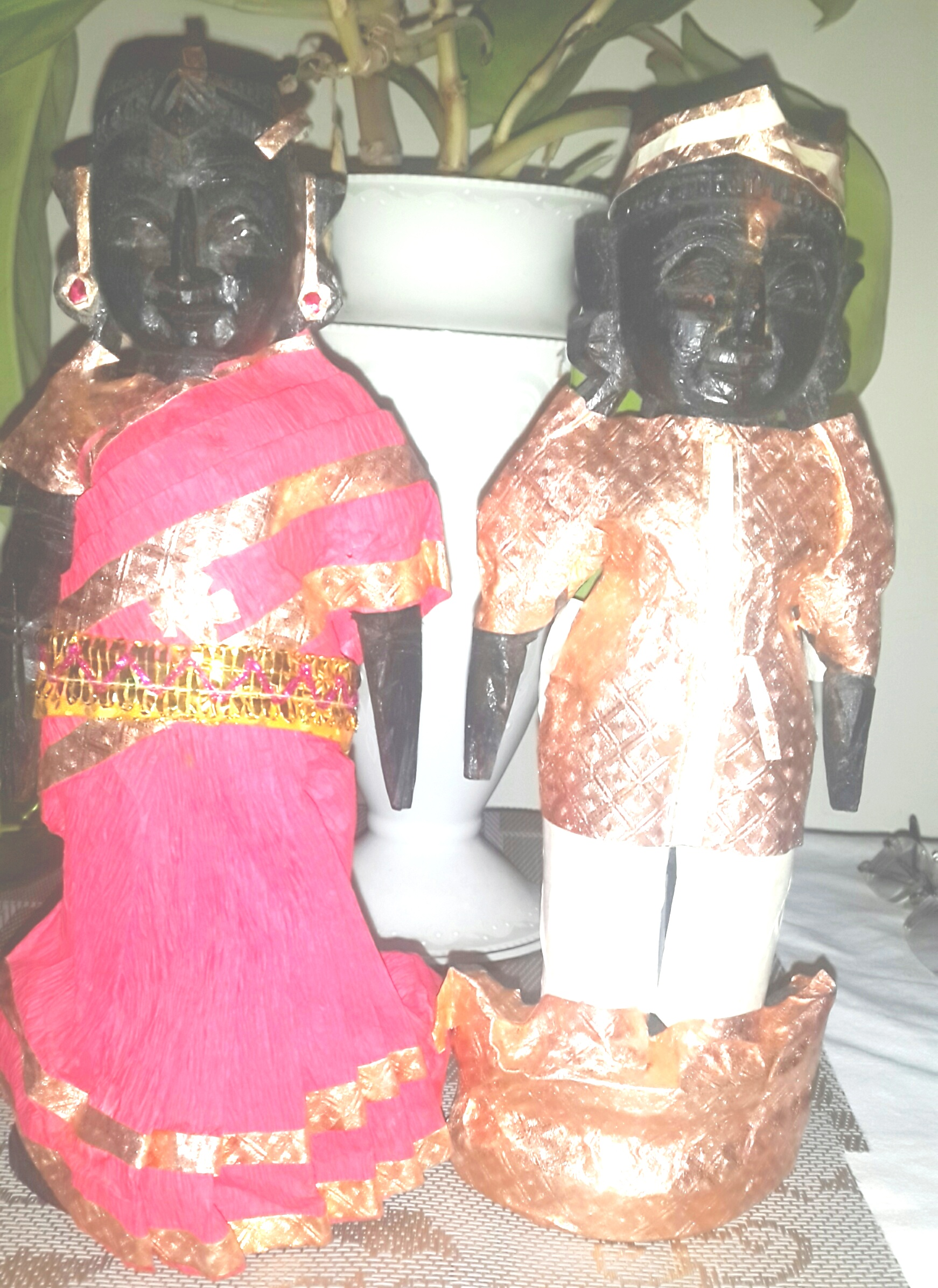
Marapachi dolls of King and Queen

Marapachi Dolls, also known as Marapachi Bommais (literal meaning: "wooden dolls"), are traditional dolls made specifically of red sandalwood (Pterocarpus santalinus) or silk-cotton-wood (Bombax) or red wood (Sequoioideae) which are displayed during the Golu festival in South India as part of Dassara or Navaratri celebrations. These dolls made in pairs generally of male and female are dressed up by children as part of plaything and displayed during the Golu or "Bommai Kolu" festival. Tirupathi is one of the locations where it is specially ornamentally carved, and the dolls are stated to represent Venkateshwara and his consort. They are also made in Kondapalli as Raja-Rani (King and Queen) dolls which are a compulsory display during the Golu festival.

As a tradition Marapachi dolls are a hereditary gift from mother to daughter when the latter starts her Bommai Kolu arrangement. A particular practice followed in South India is to gift the Marapachi Dolls to newly married couple for their children to play with. The significance of this particular gift made of Marapachi doll in red sandal wood is stated to be the medicinal quality of the wood. When a child licks this plaything made of red sandalwood, the child's saliva derives an extract of the wood which the child absorbs into its system.

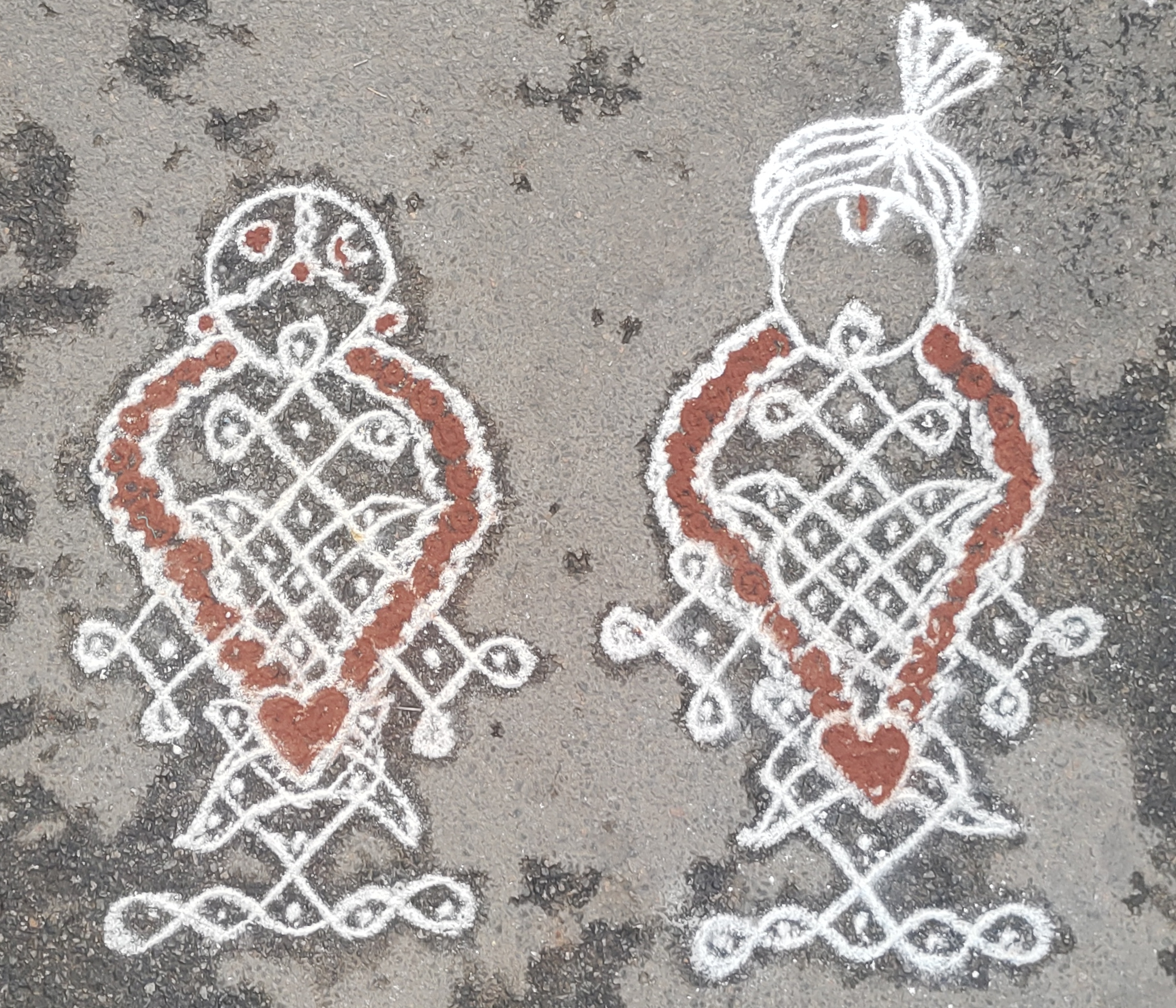
A Kollam inspired by the Marapachi Dolls

During the Golu festival, which is held in South India, as part of Navratri festival, particularly in the states of Andhra Pradesh, Karnataka, and Tamil Nadu, the Marapachi dolls are part of the display; the displays are arranged in an odd number of tiers or steps of 3, 5, 7, 9, or 11, but generally in nine steps. In the traditional arrangement, the top tier is assigned for the display of Marapachi Dolls. Other dolls, either made of clay or wood, are arranged in specified tiers. On the first day of the Navratri, which is the day following New Moon Day, worship is offered by women of the house to the Goddesses Parvathi, Lakshmi and Saraswati.

== See also ==
- Golu
- Navaratri
