= Eva Dave =

Indian writer

- Born: Praful Nandshankar Dave; 5 March 1931; Baroda, British India
- Died: 26 September 2009 (aged 78)
- Education: M. A., B. Ed., Ph. D.
- Alma mater: Maharaja Sayajirao University of Baroda; Washington University in St. Louis
- Occupations: Story writer, novelist, teacher
- Writing career
- Pen name: Eva Dave
- Language: Gujarati

Praful Nandshankar Dave (5 March 1931 – 26 September 2009) was a Gujarati writer. He wrote under the pen name of Eva Dave. He primarily wrote novels and novellas.

== Biography ==
Dave was born on 5 March 1931 in Baroda (now Vadodara), Gujarat, India . His family belonged to Nadiad. He completed his primary and secondary school education in Nadiad and started attending the university in 1949. He completed BA in Gujarati in 1953 and MA. in 1955. He completed BEd from Maharaja Sayajirao University of Baroda in 1956. He studied M. A. in Education in 1957 and PhD in 1963 from Washington University in St. Louis.

He taught at a school in Vallabh Vidyanagar from 1952 to 1956. He also served as a principal in the school in Alina in 1955. He worked as a research assistant in Washington University from 1960 to 1962. He served as the research associate in Saint Louis Mental Hospital, United States in 1963. He returned to India in 1964. He served as the Reader from 1964 to 1972 and as the Professor from 1972 to 1974 in Mysore Regional College of Education, India. He served as a principal-in-charge of Ajmer Regional College of Education from 1977 to 1944(?). In 1977, he joined NCERT, New Delhi as the Reader and later served as the Professor until his retirement in 1991. He died on 26 September 2009.

== Works ==
Dave chiefly wrote novellas. His first novella Sabuni Kakadi was published in the Prajabandhu daily. He was a modernist story writer. His stories explore relationships, family life and the life in the west. His collections of stories include Agantuk (1969), Tarangininu Swapna (1971), Tahomatdar (1980), Kalrakshas (1999) and Chhellu Farman (2005). Agantuk had 25 stories while Tarangininu Swapna has 18 stories with fresh subjects.

Isune Charane: Preyasi (1970) contains two romantic short novels. Mishra Lohi (1999) is his another novel.

== Awards ==
Dave was awarded prizes by the Gujarati Sahitya Parishad and the Gujarat Sahitya Akademi for his short stories. He received the Govardhanram Tripathi Prize and 14th Doomketu Navlika Puraskar.
