= Alexander Kinloch Forbes =

Colonial administrator in British India

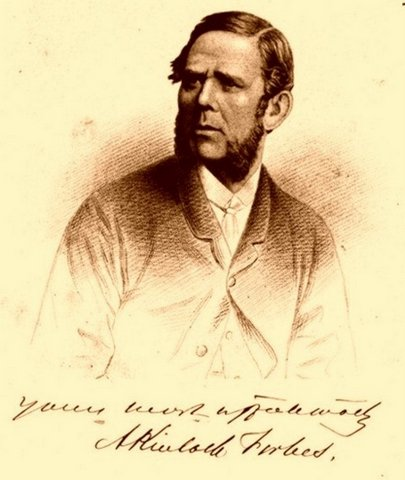
- Portrait and signature of Alexander Kinloch Forbes
- Born: July 7, 1821; London, England
- Died: August 31, 1865 (aged 44); Poona (now Pune), British India
- Education: Haileybury
- Occupations: Writer, judge
- Spouse: Margaret Moir Forbes-Mitchell
- Children: Six
- Writing career
- Language: English, Gujarati
- Notable work: Râs Mâlâ

Alexander Kinloch Forbes (7 July 1821 – 31 August 1865) was a colonial administrator in British India.

== Early life ==
Forbes was born in London on 7 July 1821 to John Forbes-Mitchell (1786-1822) of Thainston and Ann Powell (m. 1809 d. 1861). He was the youngest among six siblings. He was christened on 9 August 1821 at St. Mary, St. Marylebone, London. He was educated at a school in Finchley. He articled to George Basevi, an architect, for eight months but later joined a college Haileybury as he was appointed to Bombay Civil Service by Sir Charles Forbes in 1840. He left it in 1842 and arrived in Bombay, India in November 1843.

== Administrative career ==
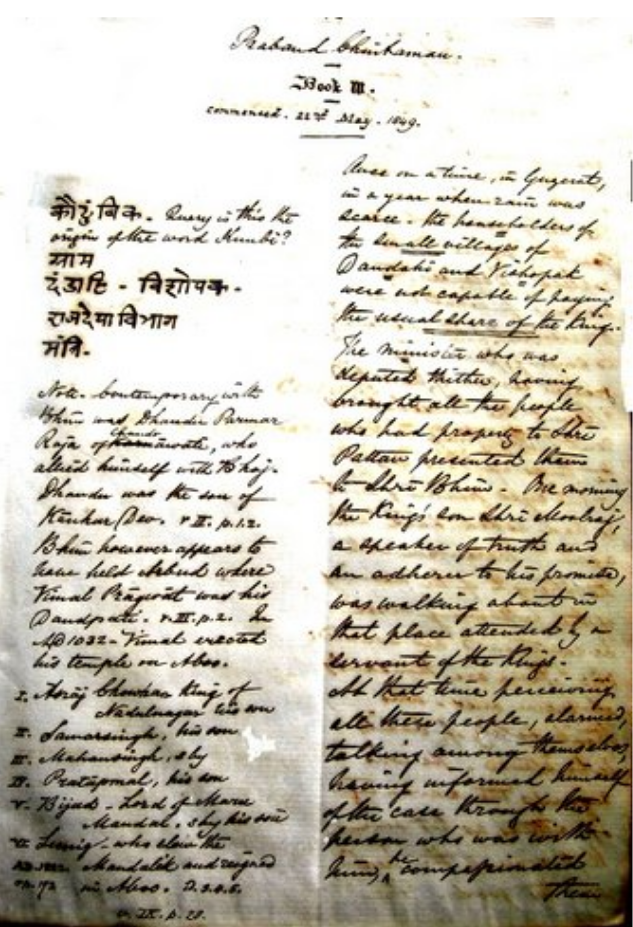
Handwriting of Forbes

Forbes was appointed in 1842 to the Civil Service of the East India Company, later moved to Bombay in 1843. He spent his initial two and half years as Assistant Collector of Ahmednagar and Khandesh. Later he was appointed as Assistant Judge in Ahmedabad in November 1846 where he noted the absence of literary society. He served in different departments in Gujarat such as First Assistant Collector of Ahmedabad and Political Agent to Mahi Kantha until he went home in March 1854. During this period he collected material which was later published as Ras Mala in 1856.

He went back to England in 1854 and returned at the end of 1856. He was appointed as Assistant Judge at Surat and later, in 1858, appointed to the same post at Khandesh. He returned to Gujarat and applied for the vacant Political Agency of Kathiawar. He was turned down but later moved to Kathiawar in September 1859 to subdue the Indian rebellion of 1857 by the Vaghers. The rebellion subdued by March 1860 and he returned to Surat as the Acting Judge. He was appointed Secretary to the Government in March 1861.

He accepted a post in Sudder Court which made him one of the first six Judges of the Bombay High Court in August 1862. He served there until his death in 1865. He also held the honorary post of Vice Chancellor of the University of Bombay. The A. Kinloch Forbes Gold Medal was awarded for proficiency in law at LL.B. Examination of the university.

== Literature ==
Forbes was introduced to Indian languages and literature through the works of William Jones and was inspired to learn Indian languages. So after moving to Ahmedabad, he began to learn Gujarati language first from Rao Saheb Bhogilal Pranavallabh (1818–1889), and then from Dalpatram, a Gujarati poet. He came into contact with Dalpatram through Bholanath Divetia in 1848. Dalpatram taught him Gujarati while Forbes encouraged him to write in Gujarati. They became close friends. He inspired Dalpatram to write Laxmi Natak published in 1849, the first play in Gujarati, based on Greek drama Plutus.

On 26 December 1848 he started the Gujarat Vernacular Society in Ahmedabad, which contributed to a literary renaissance in Gujarati. The fund of Rs 9601 was raised from locals, Baroda State and British officers. The society started the first public library, first school for girls, first periodical, first newspaper and first literary magazine of Gujarat. He was the president of Andrews Library in Surat in 1850 and founded Gujarati Sabha in Bombay in 1865. Gujarati Sabha was later renamed Farbas Gujarati Sabha after him. He organized conclave of Gujarati poets in 1852 at Idar State. Dalpatram's Farbesvilas was an account of this conclave.

Forbes also had a deep interest in archaeology, ancient monuments and manuscripts, which made him intensely interested in the old archaeological and historical remains of Gujarat. In 1856, he published Ras Mala in two volumes which documented the history and chronicles from 8th century to arrival of British and folk literature of Gujarat as well as an historical account of the place and people he came to know during his stay in Gujarat.

He also translated Dalpatram's essay Bhoot Nibandh as Demonology and Popular Superstitions of Gujarat.

== Death ==
Forbes died in Poona (now Pune, Maharashtra, India) on 31 August 1865 after a brief illness. Dalpatram composed Farbes viraha, a Gujarati elegy in his memory.

== Personal life ==
Forbes married Margaret-Moir Forbes-Mitchell (1825-1 November 1904), daughter of Henry David Forbes-Mitchell of Bawlgownie, in Bombay on 25 March 1846. They had six children; Edward Esme Forbes (1855-1920), Emmeline Maria Elizabeth Forbes, Margaret Theodora Lawrence Forbes (d. 1939), John Fraser Forbes (1847-1887), Henry David Erskine Forbes (1849-1920), and Alexander Abernethie Forbes (b. 1851).

== See also ==
- Râs Mâlâ:Hindoo Annals of the Province of Goozerat, in Western India
