= Khedaval =

The Khedaval or Khedawal is a Gujarati Brahmin community. Their traditionally served as merchants, money-lenders, pleaders, and government servants. They practice hypergamy. Some are priests in the Raṇachoḍarāy temple in Ḍākor.

According to the Brahmakṣetra Māhātmya, the Khēḍāvāḷa Brahmins originated from Khēṭaka (modern Khēḍā), five miles away from Brahmakṣetra.

== Notable members ==
- Ranchhodbhai Dave
