= Brinkhaus =

Brinkhaus is a surname. Notable people with the surname include:

- Horst Brinkhaus, German professor of Indology
- Ralph Brinkhaus (born 1968), German politician

== See also ==
- Brinkhuis
