= Necklace Inscribed with the Name of King Pratapamalladeva =

Contested Nepali necklace in US museum

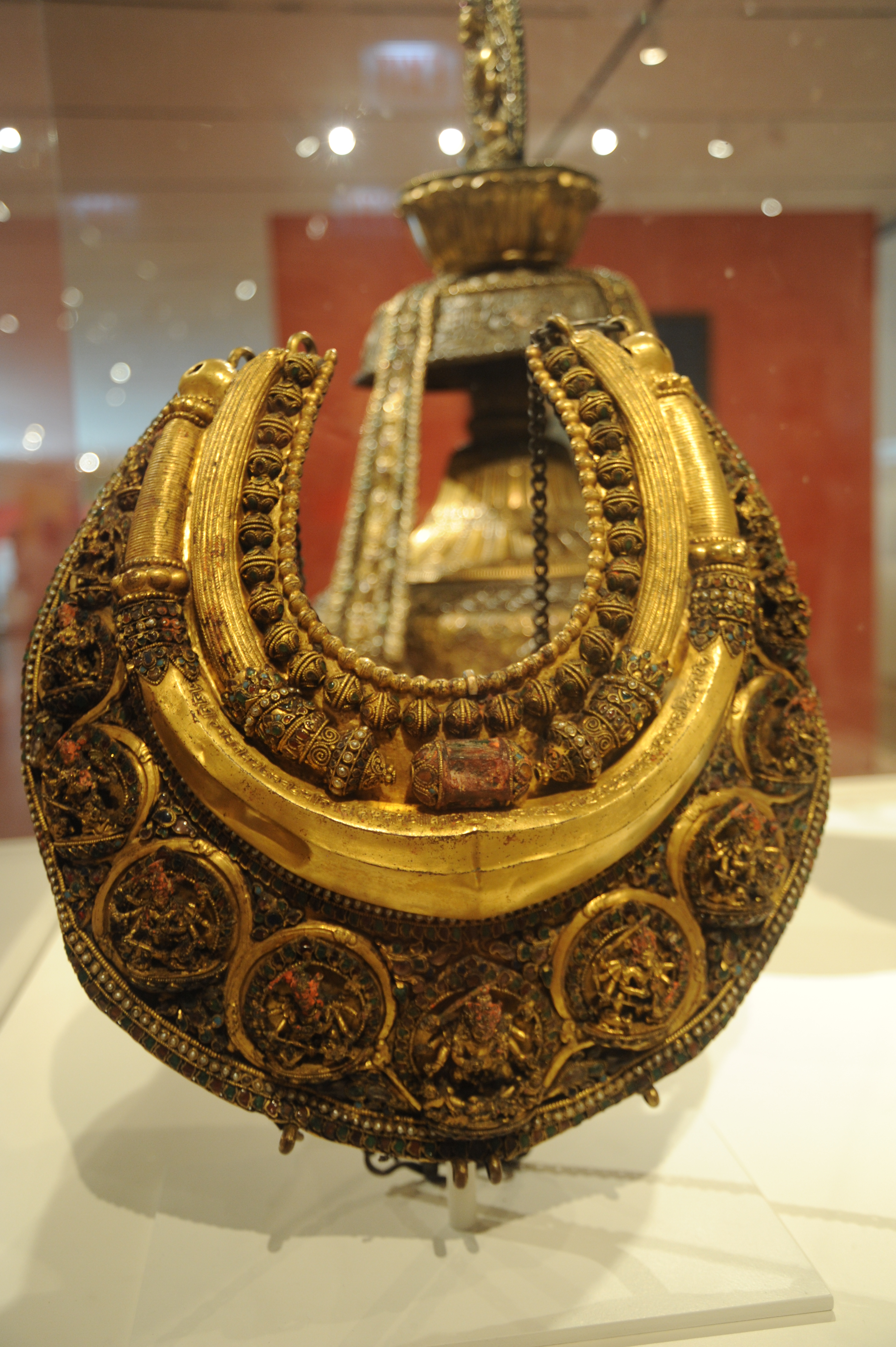
- Year: 1645–1655
- Medium: Gilt copper with semiprecious stones
- Dimensions: 36.2 cm × 35.6 cm (14.3 in × 14.0 in)
- Location: Art Institute of Chicago, Chicago
- Accession: 2010.575
- Website: https://www.artic.edu/artworks/130700/necklace-inscribed-with-the-name-of-king-pratapamalladeva

The Necklace Inscribed with the Name of King Pratapamalladeva, also known as the Taleju necklace, is a 17th-century Nepali ceremonial collar currently housed at the Art Institute of Chicago. The ornate gilt copper necklace, embellished with semiprecious stones, is attributed to King Pratap Malla (r. 1641–1674) of the Malla dynasty and is associated with the Hindu goddess Taleju Bhawani, the patron deity of Nepal's royal family. In 2021, the necklace became the subject of controversy following allegations that it had been stolen from the Taleju Temple in Kathmandu, leading to a formal repatriation request by the Government of Nepal.

== Description ==
The necklace is a highly elaborate ritual ornament traditionally associated with the Taleju Temple in Kathmandu. It may have been commissioned by King Pratapamalla (r. 1641–1674) of the Malla dynasty as an offering to Taleju Bhawani. Pratapamalla may have worn the necklace during court and temple rituals. The necklace was likely made by Newar artists, whose metalworking skills were highly prized across South Asia.

== Display history ==
According to the Art Institute of Chicago website, the necklace has been on public display at the museum since 1976, shortly after its acquisition from the Alsdorf collection. It has regularly appeared in the museum's South Asian galleries as part of the presentation of Himalayan and Nepali art.

In 1997, the necklace was included in the exhibition A Collecting Odyssey: Indian, Himalayan, and Southeast Asian Art from the James and Marilynn Alsdorf Collection (Art Institute of Chicago, 2 August – 26 October 1997).

It was later featured in Himalayas: An Aesthetic Adventure, organised by the Art Institute of Chicago (5 April – 17 August 2003). The exhibition subsequently travelled to Washington, D.C., where it was displayed at the Freer Gallery of Art and Arthur M. Sackler Gallery (18 October 2003 – 11 January 2004).

By 2026, the necklace was removed from display at the Art Institute of Chicago.

== Provenance ==
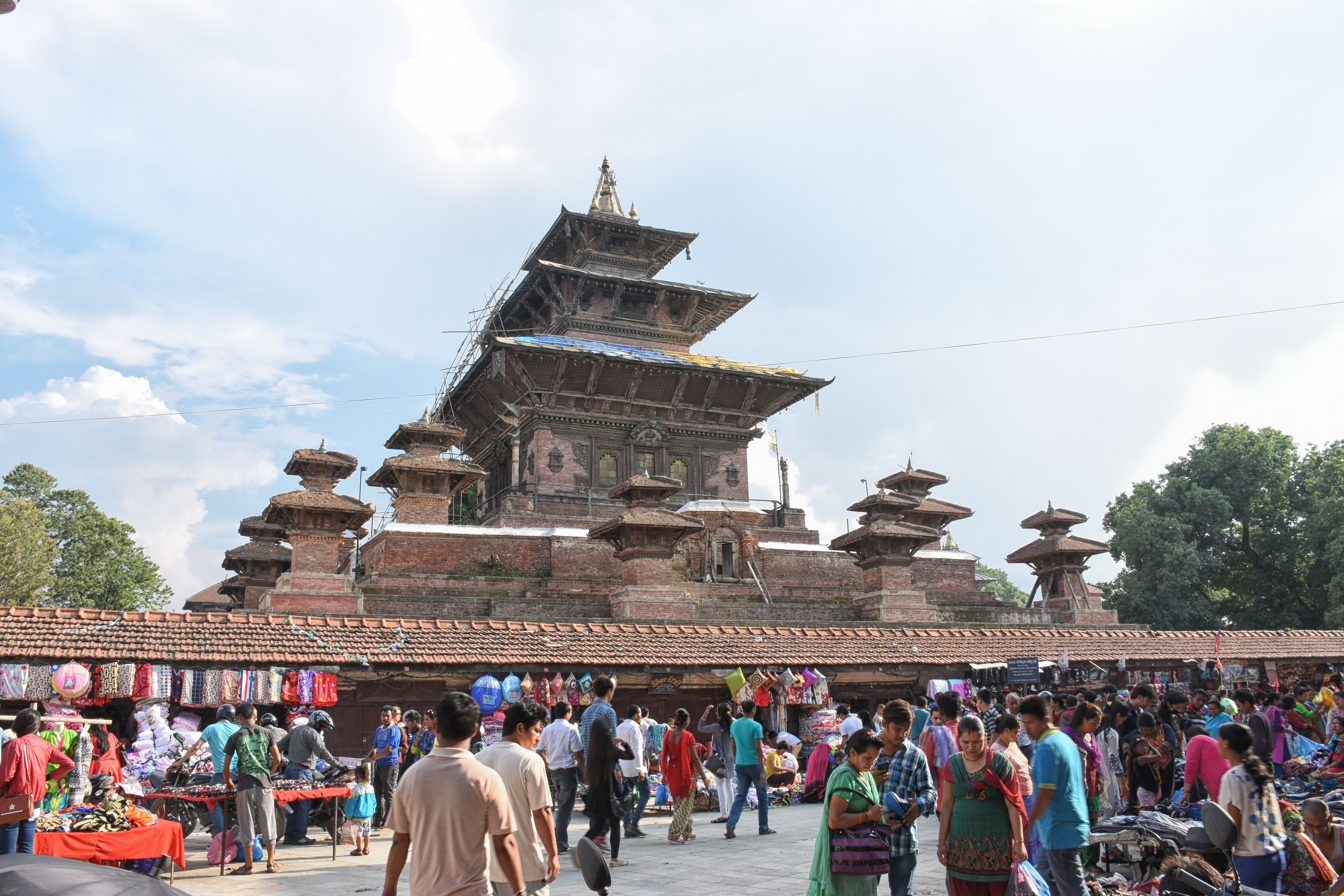
Taleju Temple

Currently, The Art Institute of Chicago has the ownership of the necklace. Despite activism and proving the provenance with historical documents and photographs, the Art Institute of Chicago is not willing to give back this necklace. The provenance of the necklace also mentions that it was sold by Bruce Miller Antiquities of Sausalito in California on 22 June, 1976 to the Alsdorf Foundation — the very year that the necklace was believed to have been stolen in Kathmandu. While, the institute the made by King Pratap Malla to the Taleju Temple in Kathmandu during the seventeenth century. This interpretation is based on the inscription on the necklace, which attributes the ornament to the king and dedicates it to the goddess Taleju.

The necklace was sold to Marilynn and James Alsdorf, Chicago collectors of Asian art. The Alsdorfs placed the necklace on long-term loan to the Art Institute of Chicago in the same year, before formally donating it to the museum in 2010.

The circumstances under which the necklace left the Taleju Temple remain disputed. Unverified claims are that the Art Institute of Chicago believes that it may have been sold by members of Nepal's royal family, while Nepali officials have maintained that the necklace was stolen from Nepal in the 1970s.

== Historical timeline ==
=== 1641–1674 | The Malla period: A sacred royal offering ===
King Pratap Malla, who ruled Kathmandu from 1641 to 1674, is associated with the jewel-studded necklace dedicated to Taleju Bhawani, the Malla kings’ patron goddess. The necklace bears an inscription identifying the king.

=== 1970| Taleju Temple ===
In 1970, during the height of the Panchayat regime, it was moved to the nearby Hanuman Dhoka Museum for safekeeping.

=== 1976 | The necklace disappears from Nepal ===
The necklace reportedly disappeared from the museum. In June 1976, American collectors James d Marilynn Alsdorf acquired it through an antique dealer (Bruce Miller Antiquties) in California. The exact circumstances under which it left Nepal remain disputed.

=== 1976–2010 | Entry into an American museum collection ===
The necklace was placed on long-term loan to the Art Institute of Chicago in 1976. It was formally donated to the museum in 2010, becoming part of its collection of South Asian art.

=== June 2021 | Rediscovery and public advocacy ===
During a visit to the Art Institute of Chicago, Nepali scholar Sweta Baniya recognized the necklace and questioned why a sacred object from Nepal was displayed in the museum. Her social media post brought widespread attention to the necklace and helped launch an international repatriation campaign.

=== August 2021 | Nepal formally requests its return ===
The Nepal government formally requested repatriation. Nepal asserted that the necklace had been removed unlawfully, while the museum sought further documentation to establish its provenance and the circumstances of its transfer.

=== July 2022 | A historical inventory comes to light ===
Guru Uddhav Karmacharya discovers a handwritten inventory associated with Taleju Temple within temple archives. The inscription and historical documentation strengthened efforts to establish the necklace’s connection to Nepal and a translation was sent to the AIC, proving the provenance.

=== 2022–2023 | Documentation and provenance dispute ===
The museum requested additional evidence from Nepal in 2022. By 2023, the dispute remained unresolved, with questions about how the necklace left Nepal and what documentation could establish the circumstances of its removal.

=== 2025 | Removed from display; return still awaited ===
The necklace was off the view since August 2025.

=== 2026| News of Return ===
Devendra Bhattarai wrote this article about the return of the Taleju Bhawani necklace. The DOA had received an email from the US embassy that said AIC was willing to return the necklace, given that the provenance was proven.

Sources: Nepali Times

=== 2026| Email from AIC that investigation is closed ===
The AIC officially emailed DOA to let them know that they are closing the investigation of the Taleju Bhawani Necklace. They continue to ask for provenance.

== Repatriation Campaign ==
After having been on view at the Art Institute of Chicago for 50 years, the Necklace became the subject of public controversy in 2021 when its presence drew attention on social media. The debate surrounding the necklace combined claims of theft during the 1970s, questions about the role of the Nepali state and monarchy in the handling of temple treasures, and competing theories of how the object left Nepal.

=== Social media ===
In 2017, the Lost Arts of Nepal page on Facebook has posted the photo of this necklace. However, the repatriation campaign for the Taleju Bhawani Necklace began in June 2021, after Virginia Tech Associate Professor Sweta Baniya posted a video and a post on Twitter showing the necklace at the Art Institute of Chicago asking why is this necklace here. Sweta Gyanu Baniya asked the question of why is it here that sparked a wide spread question about the necklace. She told the Nepali Times: "I knew the necklace was not where it was supposed to be, it belonged back in the Taleju Temple in Kathmandu." In an interview with Virginia Tech News, she said: "I did not initially think that the necklace was a stolen piece of art, but I was uncomfortable with how it was displayed at the museum." She added: "I was very overwhelmed with the emotions I had. I had a lot of questions and confusion, and the necklace overwhelmed me."

=== Nepali Times report and claims of theft ===
In an article prompted by the viral tweet, the Nepali Times reported that in 1970 the necklace was among the treasures ordered by the Panchayat government to be moved to the nearby Hanuman Dhoka Museum, which was considered safer as it was guarded by the Royal Nepal Army. According to the newspaper, the necklace subsequently disappeared in 1976. Uddhab Karmacharya, whose father was serving as head priest of the Taleju Temple at the time, was quoted as saying: "The government wanted to move the treasures for safe-keeping, but it got stolen anyway." The article did not provide details regarding this alleged theft. In a separate interview with The Rising Nepal Daily, Karmacharya remarked that he had "never seen such a necklace with the written script" during his youth visits to the temple with his father, adding that "maybe I missed it."

=== Government of Nepal's repatriation request ===
In the wake of the Nepali Times article, the Government of Nepal submitted a formal request in August 2021 to the Art Institute of Chicago for the necklace's repatriation through the Embassy of Nepal in Washington, D.C. According to ProPublica, the request was supported by a report prepared by the Department of Archaeology documenting the necklace's disappearance from the Taleju Temple in the 1970s, although the date of the report has not been made public. ProPublica, which had access to the document, reported that it stated that the necklace "must have been smuggled out of the country," while also noting that "Nepali officials don't know precisely when or how the necklace left the country, key facts to help establish its history."

=== Art Institute of Chicago's response ===
In September, 2026, the Art Institute of Chicago officially emailed the Department of Archaeology in Nepal saying that it will not continue the investigation of the necklace. The Art Institute of Chicago does not have any intention to give the necklace back as it keeps on pressing for provenance which has been provided multiple times. In May 2022, the Art Institute of Chicago asked the Nepali government to provide additional records concerning the necklace's removal from the temple, though the museum did not make public which documents it had requested. ProPublica, which had seen the museum's letter to the Embassy of Nepal in Washington, D.C., suggested in article that the Art Institute of Chicago was exploring the possibility that the "country's royal family may have helped sell the necklace (...) to fund its lavish lifestyle." The article also quoted directly from the letter, which sought information about "the actions of the Zonal Office and other government or religious officials who may have removed and separated jewelry and ornaments." A Nepali Times article published in January 2022 had noted that heritage conservationists doubted whether such objects could have been smuggled out of the country through Kathmandu airport without the knowledge of the security forces, the palace, and the government, given that Nepal was an absolute monarchy during the peak smuggling period of the 1960s–70s.

=== Discovery of the Taleju Temple inventory scroll ===
In July 2022, The Rising Nepal Daily reported that a handwritten inventory scroll had been discovered in the archives of the Taleju Temple in Kathmandu. Uddhav Man Karmacharya, the current main priest and grandson of the head priest at the time, said he began searching for records after Sweta Gyanu Baniya's social media post brought the necklace to public attention, as no documentation could be located in the Guthi Sansthan, the government trust institution established in 1964 to manage land endowments supporting Nepal's temples and religious practices, including the maintenance of records of their treasures.

He stated that he eventually uncovered the scroll—written in Pali—buried in the temple. According to the article, epigraphist Shyam Sundar Rajbanshi confirmed that the inscription on the scroll matched that on the necklace held by the Art Institute of Chicago. Karmacharya noted that the scroll was created during his grandfather's tenure and that at the time (circa 1970), a high-level committee including representatives from the royal palace, Guthi Sansthan, zoning authorities, the Home Ministry, and the Culture Ministry oversaw the inventorying of more than 300 offerings, including jewelry, but that "nobody knows where the objects were taken" thereafter.

=== Current status ===
While both the Art Institute of Chicago and the Government of Nepal agree that the necklace once belonged to the Taleju Temple, the central dispute concerns the circumstances under which it left Nepal. The Art Institute of Chicago has raised the possibility that it may have been sold by members of the royal family, whereas the Nepali government has asserted that it was stolen.

As of 2023, the dispute remained unresolved. According to a 2023 ProPublica article, the Art Institute of Chicago stated that the Nepali government had not replied to its May 2022 letter requesting additional information on the necklace. In response, a spokesperson for Nepal's Department of Archaeology said that officials were still searching for the evidence requested by the museum, but maintained that the inscription on the necklace provided "irrefutable" proof that the necklace belonged to Nepal. According to ProPublica, advocates for repatriation maintain that, even if members of the Nepali royal family were involved in the necklace's removal, the Art Institute of Chicago should return it on the grounds that it is an item of spiritual significance that is collectively owned by the nation.

In June 2026, Nepal ambassador to the US Sharad Raj Aran met with executive chair of The Art Institute of Chicago Leslie Darling to discuss the return of the necklace to Nepal.

In September 2026, the Nepali Times reported that the Art Institute of Chicago had withdrawn the necklace from display after US Immigration and Customs Enforcement received additional provenance evidence from the Nepali government indicating that it had been stolen. The Director-General of Nepal's Department of Archaeology, Saubhagya Pradhananga, stated that once the documentation was submitted, the museum began the repatriation process, saying: "The museum is working out the legalities, and it will be back in Nepal this year."

== Literature ==
- Pratapaditya Pal, A Collecting Odyssey: Indian, Himalayan, and Southeast Asian Art from the James and Marilynn Alsdorf Collection , with contributions by Stephen Little (Art Institute of Chicago in association with Thames and Hudson, 1997), p. 342, cat. 307.
- Pratapaditya Pal, Himalayas: An Aesthetic Adventure (Art Institute of Chicago in association with the University of California Press and Mapin Publishing, 2003), p. 75, cat. 43.
- Art Institute of Chicago, The Essential Guide, rev. ed. (Art Institute of Chicago, 2013), p.123.
- Sweta Baniya, The Case of Taleju Bhavani's Necklace (Virginia Tech, 2025).
- Baniya, S., (2025) Social Media as an Avenue for Social Change in TPC. In N. Jones, A. Haas, L. Gonzales, M. Williams (Eds). Routledge Handbook on Technical & Professional Communication.
- Nepal Heritage Recovery Campaign, Sacred Return: The Repatriation of Nepal's Heritage (Nepal Heritage Recovery Campaign, 2025), pp. 42-3.
