= Statue of Lakshmi-Narayana =

Historic statue from Nepal

- लक्ष्मी-नारायणकु मूर्ति (Nepali)
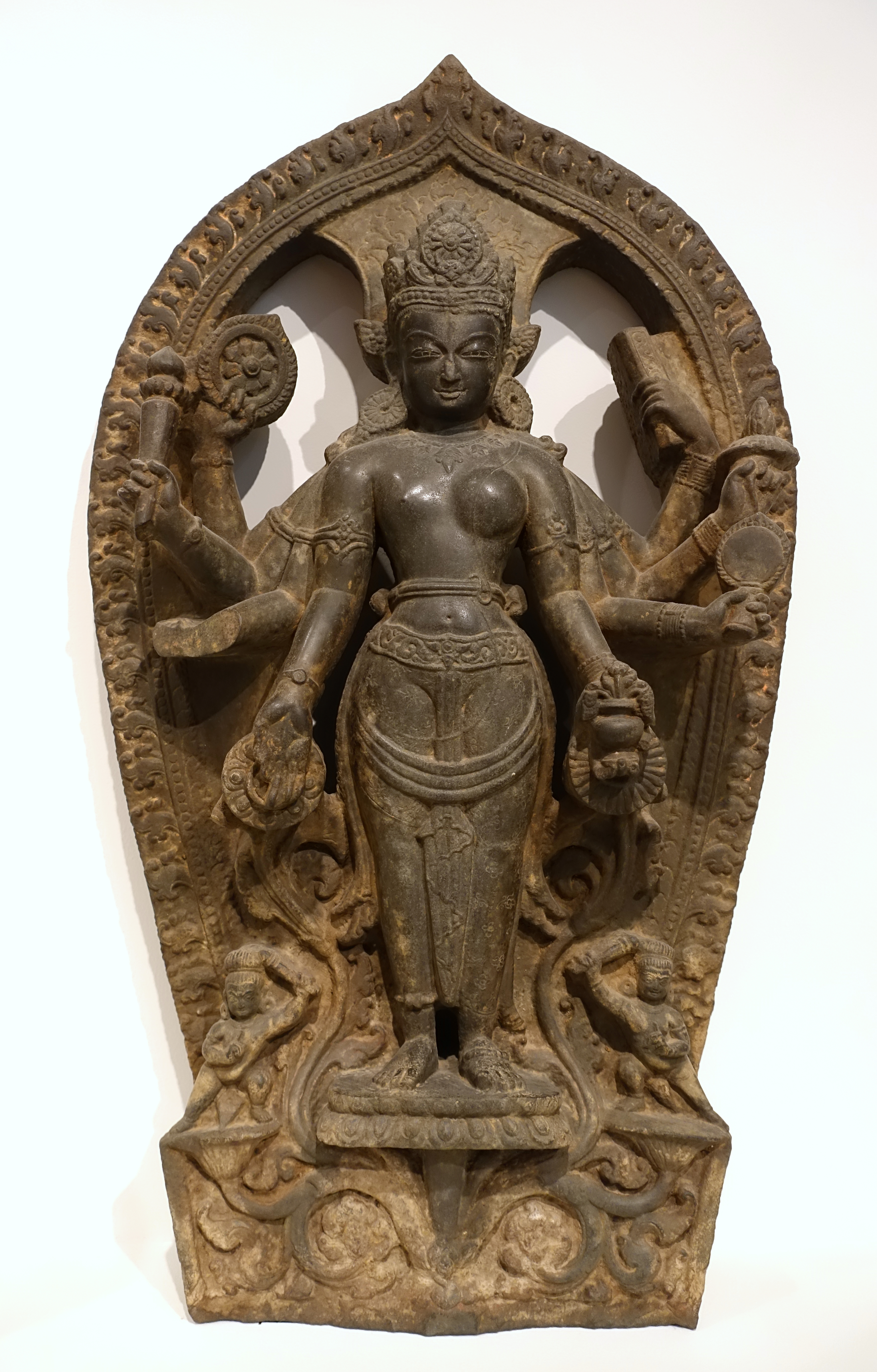
- The statue at the Dallas Museum of Art in 2017
- Year: 10th to 15th century
- Subject: Vishnu and Lakshmi
- Dimensions: 85 cm × 48.9 cm (33.5 in × 19.25 in)
- Weight: 70 kg (150 lb)
- Location: Patan, Nepal

The Statue of Lakshmi-Narayana is a historic Vaikuntha Kamalaja murti (statue) that composites the androgynous form of the Hindu god Vishnu and his consort Lakshmi. The statue dates back to the 10th to 15th century and it was originally located in Patan, Nepal. The statue had been worshipped for 800 years until it was stolen in 1984 and ended up at the Dallas Museum of Art in the United States, before being returned to Nepal 37 years later on 5 March 2021. On December 5, 2021 statue is reinstated in Narayan temple, Patan lalitpur

== Description and importance ==
Dating from the 10th to 15th centuries, the statue was situated in the Narayan Temple in Patan, Nepal. It is made from grey stone, measures about 33.5 in × 19.25 in (85.1 cm × 48.9 cm) and weighs about 70 kg (150 lb). The sculpture is a depiction of Vaikuntha Kamalaja, a composite androgynous form of the Hindu god Vishnu on the right and his consort Lakshmi on the left. The two gods can be identified by the items each are holding: from top to bottom, Vishnu holds a mace, a discus, a conch, and a lotus, while Lakshmi holds a manuscript, a mirror, jewels, and a water pot, and bares a breast. The figure wears a crown, earrings, armlets and bangles, and the garment below the stomach is held by a highly decorated girdle. The pleat is shown falling down, the three-fold scarf is tied around the pleat in a loop around the thighs. Two small idols are standing on louts; they are featured waving a mace, and the oblong stela is decorated with pearls and a flame pattern.

Statues of Vaikuntha Kamalaja are rarely seen outside the Kathmandu Valley, and those available are from ancient iconography. The Lakshmi-Narayana sculpture is a significant statue that had been worshipped for 800 years at the Narayan Temple. After the theft of the statue, in 1993, a duplicate idol was created to replace the original. The replacement did not have the same significance as the original, with a social activist from Patan saying: "God is god regardless of it being a replica or not. However, it does pinch you that the original piece is among foreigners who could not care less about its religious significance." Many pilgrims stopped travelling to the temple for puja, and the neighbourhood's festivals were also troubled.

== Theft ==
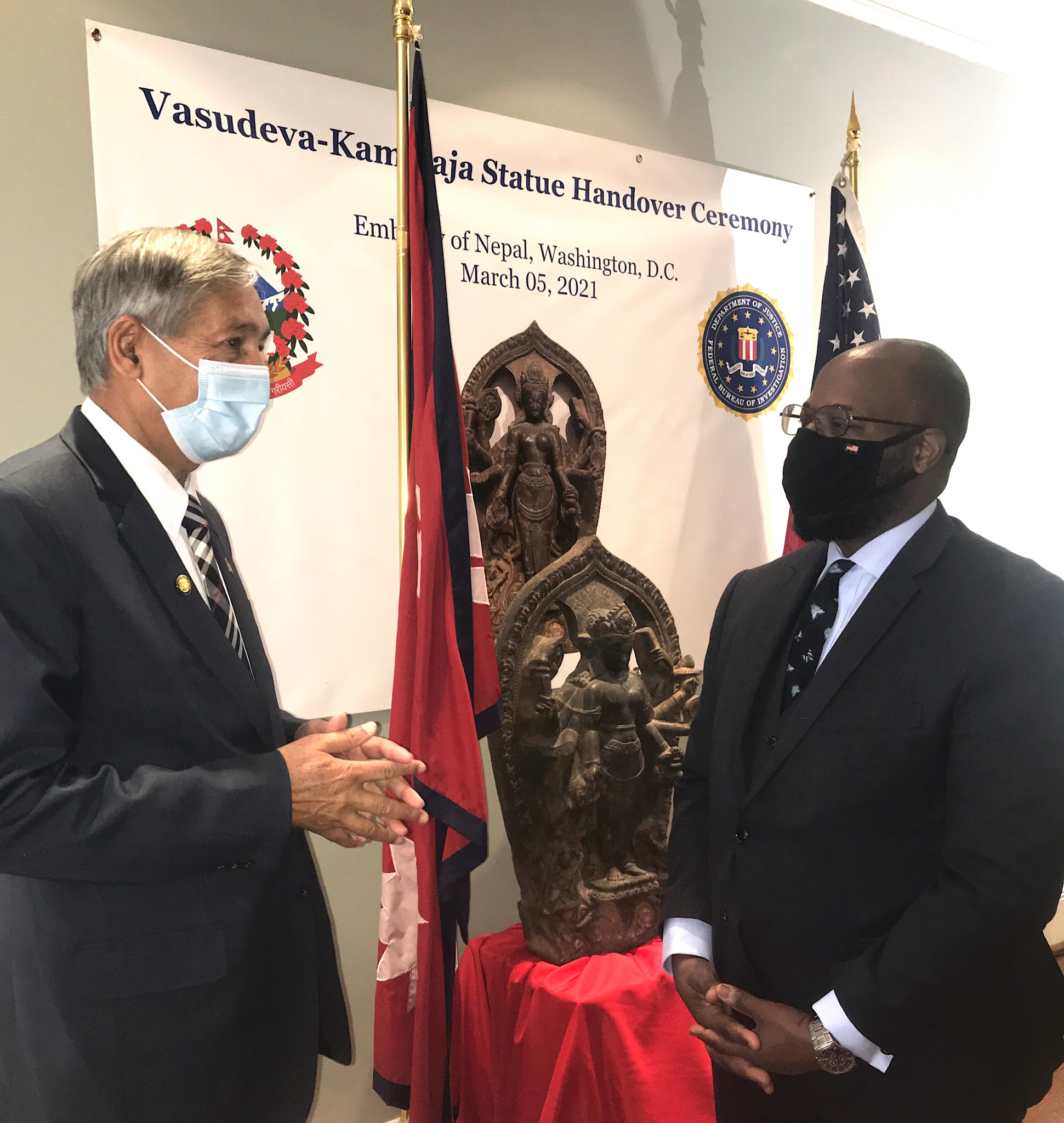
The statue at the handover ceremony, with Nepalese ambassador Yuba Raj Khatiwada

In 1956, the Kingdom of Nepal passed the Ancient Monuments Preservation Act, which prevented the exportation of historic statues from the country. In the 1950s, Nepal opened its border to foreigners, with thousands of tourists going to Kathmandu around the 1980s; since then, art began to slowly disappear from temples and monasteries and appear in museums. According to an estimate in 2020, over half of historical artworks from the Kathmandu Valley had been stolen. One evening in 1984, the Statue of Lakshmi-Narayana vanished from the temple. The statue had first been published in Images of Nepal (1984) by the historian Krishna Deva, and the theft was first documented in Lain Singh Bangdel's Stolen Images of Nepal (1989). On 22 March 1990, it was sold by the international auction house Sotheby's for an undisclosed sum, and the statue was valued at around US$30,000–40,000 in 1999. Sotheby's did not have any records about the auction to prove the statue's provenance. Later, the art collector David T. Owsley loaned the statue to the Dallas Museum of Art.

In 2013, the American artist Joy Lynn Davis painted the statue at its original temple based on her photographs of the temple and the Sotheby's auction photograph. In 2015, she came across a blurry picture of the idol on a blog while conducting a Google Image search as part of a larger investigation into the whereabouts of Nepal's stolen statues. Davis recognized that it was the same statue that had been stolen in 1984, and traced it to the Dallas Museum of Art. On 16 December 2019, the museum removed the statue from view after the art historian Erin L. Thompson tweeted about "its questionable provenance".

In 2019, the museum notified the U.S. Embassy in Nepal, which provided information about the statue. The museum and the lender were subsequently approached by the Federal Bureau of Investigation (FBI), which helped to reach a "mutual resolution and effectuate the transfer of this important object to Nepal". The FBI led a month-long investigation with the U.S. embassy, the Diplomatic Security Service's Overseas Criminal Investigations, the Nepal Police, and the Dallas Museum of Art. On 5 March 2021, the Statue of Lakshmi-Narayana was handed to Yuba Raj Khatiwada, Ambassador of Nepal to the United States by Timothy Dunham, Deputy Assistant Director of the FBI. The same day, Lalitpur Metropolitan City paid the shipping costs, and the statue will be placed at the original site after chhama puja. Chhama puja is a worship that seeks forgiveness in case of any unknowing violation of rituals.

== Legacy ==
Activists from Nepal said the return of the statue "could be the start of a process of repatriating thousands of other religious objects from Kathmandu that are now in Western private collections or museums".
