= Hanuman Dhoka =

Kathmandu's old royal palace

Coordinates: 27.7042°N 85.3075°E

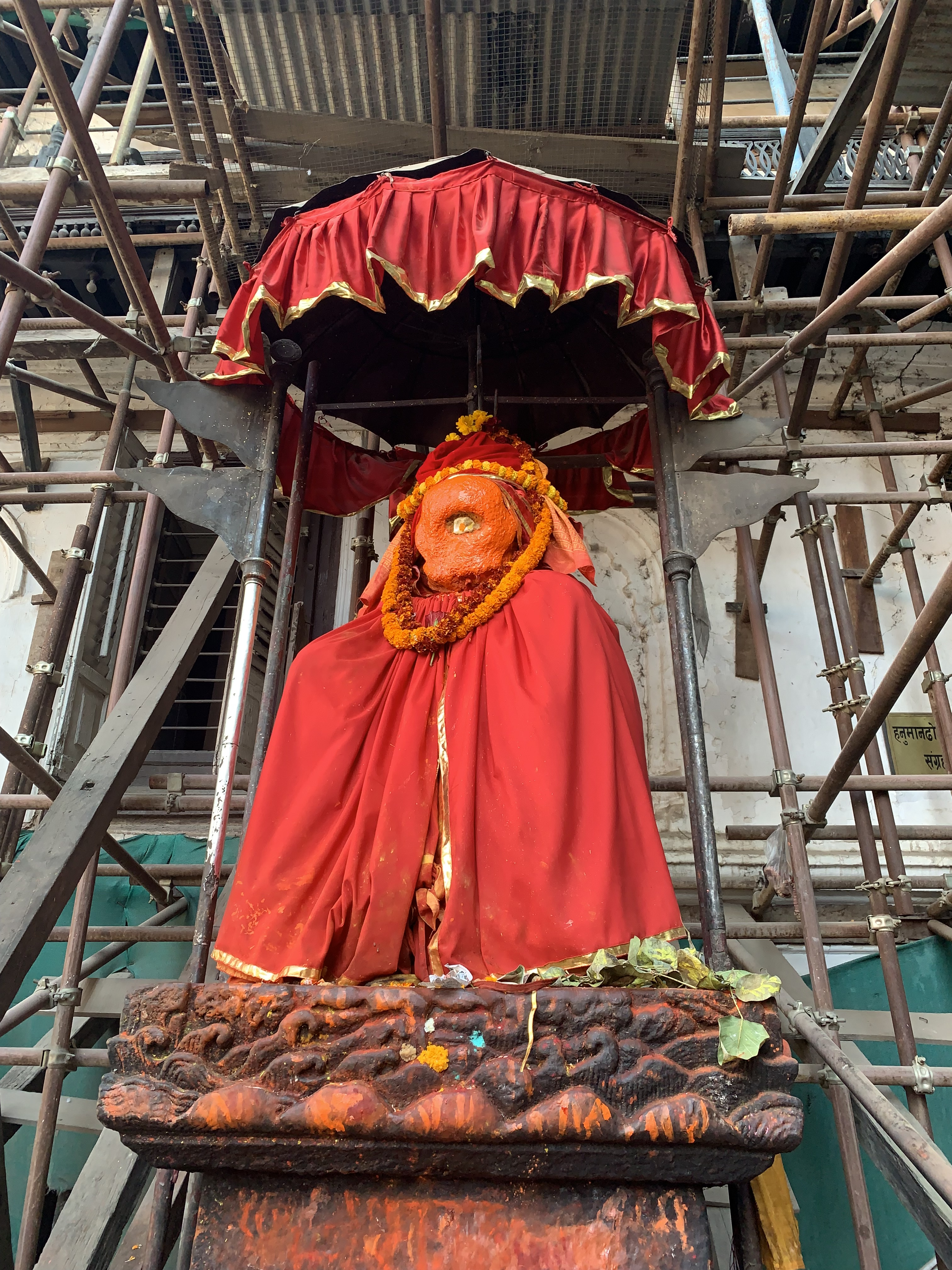
The Hanuman Idol which is the namesake of Hanuman Dhoka, pictured here in 2023

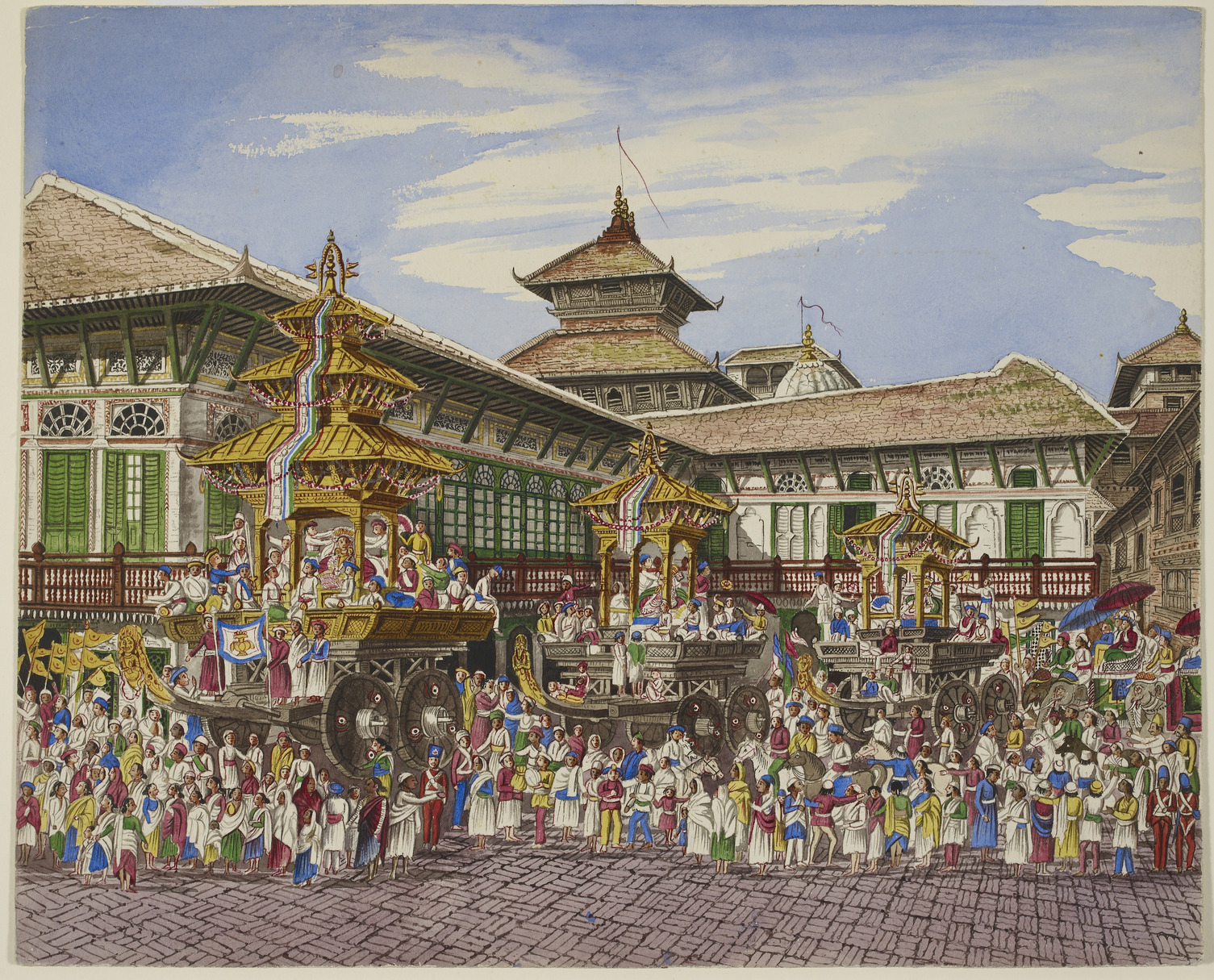
The Hanuman Dhoka in the 1850s, during the Kumari Jatra festivities

Hanuman Dhoka (Nepali: हनुमान ढोका) is a complex of structures with the Royal Palace of the Malla kings and also of the Shah dynasty in the Durbar Square of central Kathmandu, Nepal. The Hanuman Dhoka Palace (Hanuman Dhoka Darbar in Nepali) gets its name from the stone image of Hanuman, the Hindu deity, that sits near the main entryway. 'Dhoka' means door or gate in Nepali. The buildings were severely damaged in the 2015 earthquake.

== History ==
The eastern wing with ten courtyards is the oldest part dated to the mid 16th century. It was expanded by King Pratap Malla in the 17th century with many temples. Sundari Chok and Mohan Chok in the north part of the palace are both closed. In 1768, in the southeast part of the palace, four lookout towers were added by Prithvi Narayan Shah. The royal family lived in this palace till 1886. They afterwards shifted to Narayanhiti Palace. The stone inscription outside is in fifteen languages. The stone is a jaladroni (drinking fountain) and legend states that for someone who understands all 15 languages, milk instead of water would spring from it.

== Description ==
=== Hanuman Gate ===
The "Hanuman Dhoka" proper, or Hanuman Gate, is located on the west side of Durbar Square. It is the entry gate to the palace, where a standing statue of Hanuman (monkey god), dated to 1672, guards the palace. Hanuman is decked with a red cloth and an umbrella. The face is smeared with a red paste. On the left is a stone sculpture dated to 1673 of Narasimha (the half-man, half-lion incarnation of Vishnu), devouring the demon Hiranyakashipu, which is credited to Pratap Malla period according to an inscription on the pedestal of the image.

=== Nasal Chok ===
Ahead of the main entrance, adjoining the Hanuman Temple is the Nasal Chok courtyard ('Nasal' means "dancing one" in Nepal bhasha) named after the image of dancing Shiva located on the east side of the square. This is the square where Birendra was crowned as king in 1975, on the platform in the middle of the courtyard. At the south side of the courtyard, stands the nine storey Basantapur Tower. While the courtyard was built during Malla Period, the buildings around it, which depict intricately carved doorways, windows, and struts, were creations of the Rana rulers. Nasal Chok is rectangular in a north–south direction with entrance from the northwest corner. Near the entrance is an intricately carved doorway with carvings of four gods that leads to the private apartments of Malla king. A golden image of Maha Vishnu is seen now in an open veranda on the eastern wall. The original Maha Vishnu Temple in the square, which housed this image, was destroyed in the 1934 Nepal–Bihar earthquake. Other structures in the courtyard are: the Audience Chamber of the Malla kings in the northeast corner, the throne of the Malla kings in an open verandah and portraits of the Shah Kings.

The Panch Mukhi Hanuman Temple (five-faced Hanuman) dedicated to Hanuman is in the northeast corner of the Nasal Chok. It has a unique design of five circular roofs. The temple priest is the only person who can enter the sanctum of the temple.

The Basantapur Tower ('Basantpur' means "place of Spring") is located on the south of Nasal Chok. It is a nine-storey tower from the top of which a panoramic view of the palace and city could be seen. Erotic images are carved on the struts of this tower. This tower is one of the four red towers that King Prithvi Narayan Shah, built delimiting the four old cities of the Kathmandu Valley namely, the Kathmandu or the Basantapur Tower, the Kirtipur Tower, the Bhaktapur Tower or Lakshmi Bilas, and the Patan or Lalitpur Tower.

=== Mul Chok ===
Mul Chok, dedicated to Taleju Bhawani, is a courtyard with two storey buildings all round that are exclusive places for religious rites. Taleju Bhawani is the tutelary goddess of the Malla family. Taleju Temple with a golden torana (door garland) is located to the south side of the courtyard. During the Dashain festival, the deity of Taleju is shifted to this temple. The entrance to the temple is flanked with images of the river goddesses Ganges and Yamuna. Degu Taleju Temple is another triple-roofed temple built by Shiva Singh Malla that is also dedicated to Taleju.

=== Mohan Chok ===
Mohan Chok, built in 1649 to the north of Nasal Chok, was the residential courtyard of the Malla kings. It was mandatory for a Malla king to be born here to become heir to the throne; an example cited to this belief is that of Jaya Prakash Malla who faced difficulties. At the center of the courtyard, there is a golden waterspout, known as Sun Dhara, said to be spring sourced from Budhanilkantha, in the north part of Valley. It is an ornately carved spout sunk several metres below the courtyard level and the Malla kings used it for their daily ablutions. The four corners have towers. To the north of this chok is the Sundari Chok.

=== Museums ===
On the west side of Nasal Chok, the Tribhuwan Museum has exhibits of items of the grandfather of King Birendra. Exquisite stone carvings, several impressive thrones, jewel-studded ornaments used for coronations, weapons, furniture, wooden temple carvings and a coin collection are on display at the museum. King Tribhuwan's bedroom, study and personal effects have been recreated and preserved here. This part of the palace, next to Durbar Square, was built by the Ranas in the mid to late 19th century.

The southeast corner of the courtyard has the King Mahendra Memorial Museum where two thrones are also on display.

== Palace Museum ==
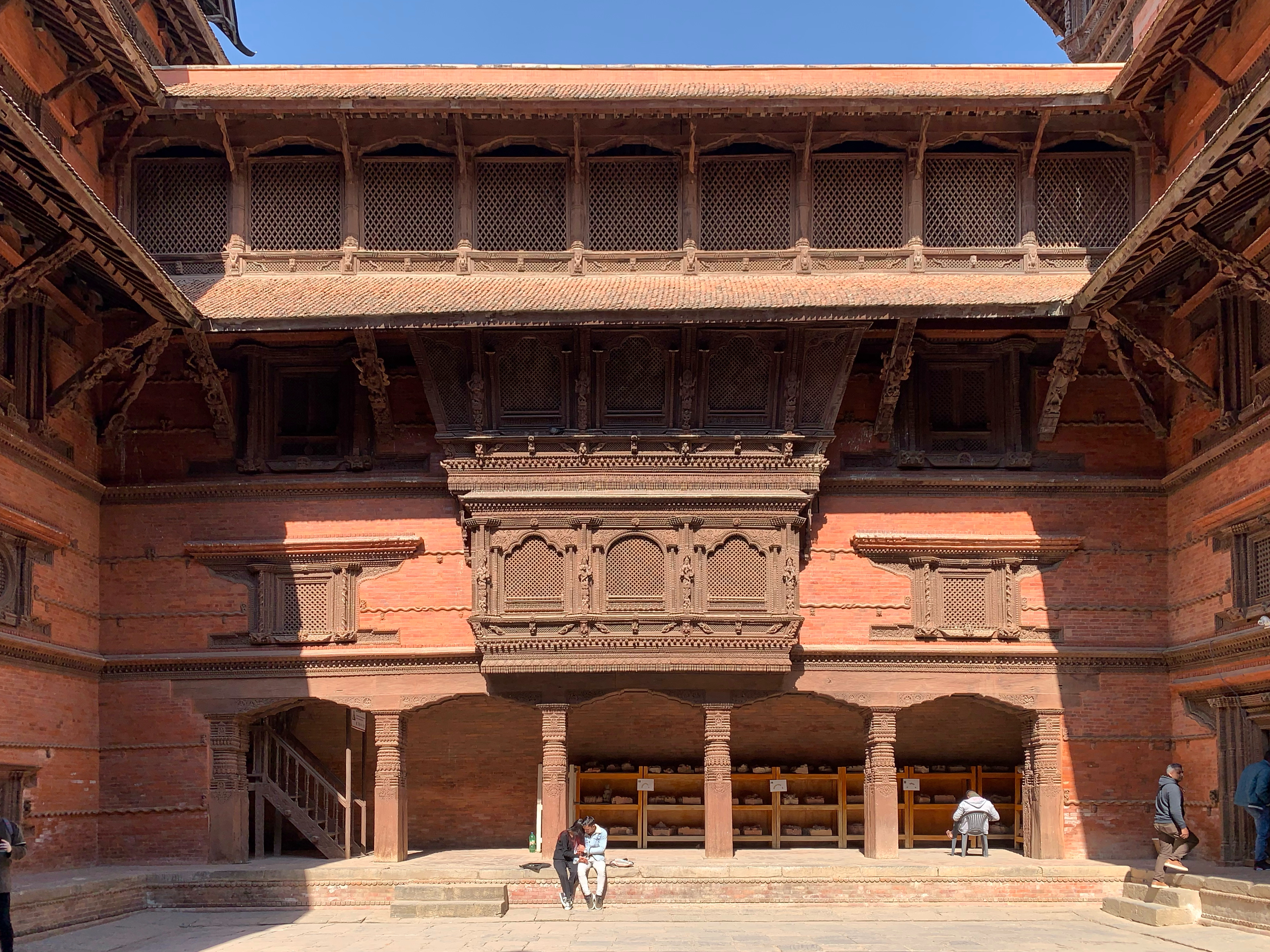
One of the courtyards of Hanuman Dhoka

The Hanuman Dhoka Palace Museum is housed in the Hanuman Dhoka Palace and run by the Nepalese government. The museum is part of the larger Hanuman Dhoka Palace complex, which is known as Hanuman Dhoka Durbar in Nepali. The palace gets its name from the stone image of Hanuman, the Hindu monkey god, that sits near the main entryway. 'Dhoka' means door in Nepali.

The museum tour begins with the section on the Shah Dynasty, the last clan to rule over Nepal, until they were toppled in 2006. This section has artifacts relating to the lives of the various Shah kings, right from their infancy to marriage to their coronation.

There is also a section commemorating the historic changes in Nepal, such as the repealing of the slave system, an act that cost the government of the time Nepali rupees 3,670,000.

== See also ==
- List of museums in Nepal
