= Erin Thompson =

Erin Thompson may refer to:

- Erin L. Thompson, American art historian and lawyer
- Erin Thompson (politician), Australian politician
