= Jumadi =

Androgynous Hindu deity of Tulunadu

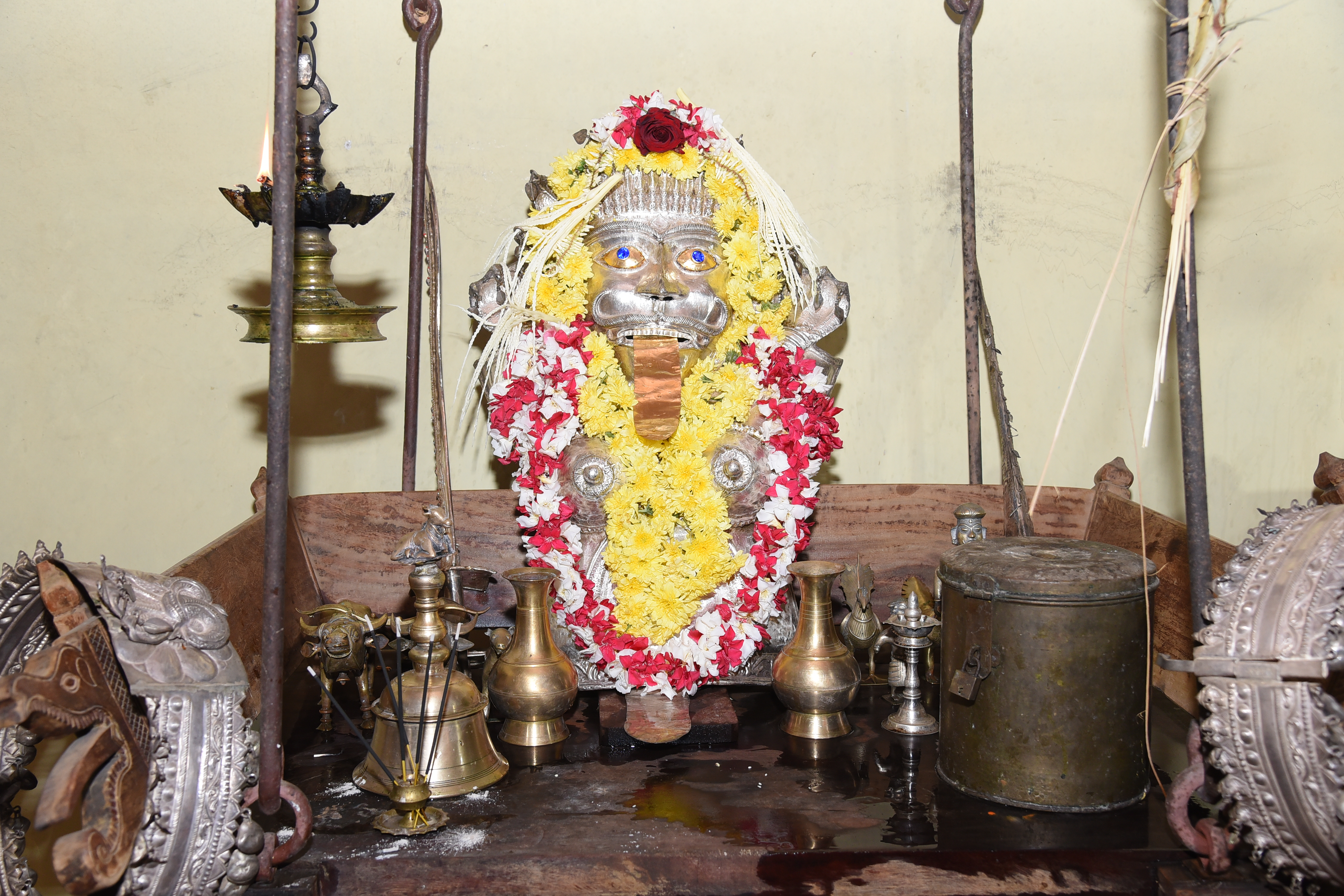
- Murti of Jumadi
- Affiliation: Grāmadevatā; Kuladevata
- Weapon: sword Ghanta
- Texts: Folk religion Dravidian folk religion Animism

Jumadi, also known as Dhumavati, is an androgynous deity worshipped in the Buta Kola folk tradition. The Buta Kola is popular among the Tuluva ethnic people in the coastal districts of Karnataka, India.

== History ==
Jumadi is considered a deity of heavenly origin who descends to the Tulunadu region to receive worship from the people.

The various myths prevalent in the region describe the deity's insatiable thirst

The myths pertaining to Jumadi are oral in nature and are recorded in distinctive Tulu folk songs called paddanas.

The paddanas record the various adventures and legends of the deity. They also record the various forms and names of the deity such as Kanteri Jumadi (Jumadi worshipped by the Bunt feudal lords, Kantanna Adhikari and Devu Poonja), Marlu Jumadi (the wild form of the princely Jumadi), and Sarala Jumadi (Jumadi worshipped by a thousand households),Paddeyi Jumadi in Kumble seeme,Pancha jumadi for Tulu Brahmins.

In Kasaragod and Kumble region Jumadi has a large Boar muga with erupted Teeth(damshtra) with earings of naga with human praying and an elephant on the either ears. paccording to the pardhanas this is the moola roopa of her with weapon like trishula with shield,sword,chamara and ghante.

In other places like mangalore and udupi Jumadi has muga that resembles a male person with moustache,

The legend of Jumadi describes a man-eating asura with insatiable thirst named Dhumasura, who had a boon by which neither a man nor a woman could kill him. Shiva and Parvati were invoked by their adherents, who then descended from Kailasha to slay the asura. On their way, Parvati felt hungry, and Shiva tried to satisfy her through various means, but she remained unsatiated. At last, Shiva offered himself, and ordered Parvati to swallow him. As Parvati swallowed him, Shiva's head did not pass beyond his consort's throat. Their bodies fused, in which the face of Shiva appeared with a moustache, below which was the neck and the body of Parvati. The deity's throat featured the lingam and wore a crown of nagas (snakes). This androgynous form of Shiva and Parvati slew Dhumasura in battle, because of which the deity received the epithet Dhumavati (not to be confused with the Mahavidya goddess Dhumavati.)

== See also ==
- Ardhanarishvara
- Vaikuntha Kamalaja
- Ila
- Nagaradhane
