= Brinkhuis =

Brinkhuis is a surname. Notable people with the surname include:

- Galil Brinkhuis, South African politician
- Jan Brinkhuis (born 1952), Dutch mathematician
- Nienke Brinkhuis (born 1971), Dutch actress who appeared in Swingers (2002 film)
