= Taleju =

Nepalese goddess

- Supreme goddess of Nepal Mandala; Royal tutelary goddess of the Malla kings;
- Anthropomorphic form of Taleju in Bhaktapur Durbar Square, 1753.
- Other names: Yeṭā Parameśvarī; Tārāju; Talesvari; Tavadevara Sveṣṭadevatā; Tulaja
- Venerated in: Hinduism (Shaktism); Newar Buddhism; Tibetan Buddhism
- Affiliation: Durga; Kubjika; Tara
- Major cult center: Nepal Mandala
- Mount: White horse
- Gender: Female
- Region: Nepal Mandala
- Temples: Taleju Temple, Kathmandu; Taleju Temple, Patan; Taleju Temple, Bhaktapur
- Festivals: Mohani; Vijayadashami

Taleju (Newar: 𑐟𑐮𑐾𑐖𑐸; Devanagari: तलेजु) or Taleju Maju (Newar: 𑐟𑐮𑐾𑐖𑐸 𑐩𑐵𑐖𑐸 taleju māju; "mother taleju") or Taleju Bhavani is a goddess worshiped primarily in the Kathmandu Valley of Nepal. While her precise theological identification remains uncertain, Taleju has been variously identified with Durga and Kalika in Newar Hindu traditions and with Tara in Newar Buddhism and Tibetan Buddhism. Taleju was the royal tutelary deity (sveṣṭadevatā) of the Malla rulers of Nepal, under whose patronage her worship became closely associated with the royal courts of the Kathmandu Valley. Temples dedicated to her are found in the former Malla capitals of Bhaktapur, Kathmandu and Patan, with the shrine at Bhaktapur traditionally regarded as her principal sanctuary.

Although traditional Nepalese chronicles from the 19th century push her history to the 14th century, linking her establishment with the Karnata king Harisimhadeva in 1324, the earliest known documentary evidence of her cult dates only to the sixteenth century. The name Taleju itself is first attested in 1644; in a copper-plate inscription issued during the reign of Pratap Malla, with earlier records referring to the goddess through locational epithets or names associated with her status as a tutelary deity.

Beyond her historical association with the Malla kings, Taleju continues to occupy an important position in the religious traditions of the Newar people. Her worship is particularly prominent in Bhaktapur, where ceremonies dedicated to the goddess form an important part of Mohani, the Newar autumn festival. Taleju is also closely associated with the Kumari tradition, in which selected young girls are venerated as living manifestations of the goddess. Many Newar towns in the Nepal Mandala still maintain distinct Kumari institutions.

== Name ==
=== Etymology ===
The etymology of the name Taleju remains uncertain. Bronwen Bledsoe suggests that it may derive from the Newar word tale, meaning "high" or "upper", combined with the honorific suffix ju, giving the interpretation "the deity of the high temple". The same etymology from the Newar word tale is proposed by Lidke who considers the name as "goddess on high", referencing her tall temple in Kathmandu. A similar interpretation is offered by Zotter, who understands the name as referring to a venerable (ju) on high (tale).

Lidke also proposed an alternative Sanskrit etymology of Taleju from the word "tal" meaning "bottom, lower or foundation" joined with "eju", from the root word "ej" meaning "to tremble, vibrate or stir", thus rendering her name as "goddess who trembles/stirs at foundation". Mary Slusser also proposes an alternative etymology from the root tala, which she considers as a tantric designation of the genitalia. An alternative explanation derives Taleju from Tulajā, a name associated with Tulja Bhavani of Maharashtra, India. However, the historical relation between the two goddesses remain uncertain. The scholar Naghabhani however challenged this identification on chronological grounds, noting that Tulajā is not attested as a name for the Nepalese goddess until the 19th century.

=== Timeline ===
A 1753 coin from Jaya Prakash Malla with "Sri 3 Tāleju Māju" written in the Newar Script.

The earliest dated object in the Taleju temples of the Kathmandu Valley is a wooden tympanum in Bhaktapur, dated to NS 671 bhadra sukla 7 (16 September 1551), which names her yeṭā parameśvarī. In Classical Newar, yeṭā means "south," a reference to her shrine's location in the southern building of a courtyard in the palace of Bhaktapur, while parameśvarī is a Sanskrit epithet meaning "the supreme goddess".

Earlier textual evidence indicates that the Taleju temple in Bhaktapur was already established by the mid-sixteenth century, although it was not yet explicitly called Taleju. A historical diary from Bhaktapur dated to 1655 records that in NS 665 Vaiśākha 12 (May 1545), King Prana Malla had offered five golden gajura to the temple of Taleju, with the text using the name "āgama" for the goddess, translating as "the family deity" from Classical Newar. The same name "āgama" is used in the chronicle for another event in NS 666 Mārgaśīrṣa 15 (December 1545). Similarly, when recording another event relating to the temple in Bhaktapur dated to NS 706 phalguna sukla 2 (20 February 1586), the chronicle uses "yeṭā āgama" where "yeṭā" again means "south".

In Kathmandu, the earliest name associated with the goddess is tavadeora meaning "tall temple" in Classical Newar, referring to the Taleju temple of Kathmandu. It is used in the form tavadevara sveṣṭadevatā meaning "tutelary deity of the tall temple" in a treaty between Lakshmi Narasimha Malla and Siddhi Narasimha Malla, dated to NS 741 māgha vadī caturdaśī (20 February 1621). The Malla period chronicles use the name tavadeora when referring to the establishment of the Taleju temple by Mahendra Malla in NS 684 Māgha kṛṣṇa 10 (17 February1564).

The name Taleju itself is first attested only later, in a Newar language copper plate of Pratap Malla in Kathmandu dated to NS 764 jestha purnima (20 June 1644). Since then the name Taleju was very commonly used to refer to the goddess in sources from the Malla period.

Her name was recorded as "Talagu" by the Capuchin Costantino da Ascoli, in an essay from 1747. Similarly, the 8th Situ Rinpoche in his 1748 account of Nepal uses the name "Tārāju" to refer to the goddess Taleju of Bhaktapur.

The East India Company diplomat William Kirkpatrick, in his 1811 book, uses "Toolaja Bhowani" and is the first instance of the use of the name Tulajā for the goddess. The subsequent chronicles of Nepal from the 19th century also exclusively use the name Tulajā for the goddess.

== History ==
=== Mythology ===
Main temple of Taleju inside a courtyard of Bhaktapur Durbar Square, considered to be the oldest shrine of Taleju.

The earliest known source for an account for the origin of Taleju is a Tibetan text by Chos kyi dbang phyug (1584–1630), the sixth Shamarpa, in his pilgrimage diary, A Jewel-Studded Garland, a Journey to Nepal (Tibetan: བལ་ཡུལ་དུ་བགྲོད་པའི་ལམ་ཡིག་ནོར་བུ་སྤེལ་མའི་ཕྲེང་བ།, Wylie: Bal yul du bgrod pa’i lam yig nor bu spel ma’i ’phreng ba). The text gives the following account:

A terrible epidemic once broke out in Nepal while Lord Milarepa was staying at a residence in Nyishang. After the king learned of his fame as one who had attained realization, he wished to invite Lord Mila. Then this, Tārā image spoke a prophecy: “Even if you invite Lord Mila, he will not come. Offer your prayers to him with an offering of arura and one kashika muslin cloth.” The king of that period was one who had attained the power of magic stares and glances, and by means of such a stare he offered and transferred some arura and a roll of such cloth. From his side, the Majestic Lord, by his own magic sight, accepted these; thus, it is locally said.

The earliest Nepalese source regarding the origin of Taleju are Sanskrit genealogical texts belonging to the Rajopadhyaya families of Bhaktapur and Patan titled Talejvāgama and Tulyāgama dating to the 17th century. Brinkhaus connects these texts to a genealogy that King Jagajjyoti Malla of Bhaktapur had developed in 1628, which traced the descent of the Malla dynasty from Harisimha, the last king of the Karnata dynasty of Mithila. The two texts incorporate Taleju into this tradition by linking her arrival in Nepal to Harisimha's own arrival there. (Note: In reality, Harisimhadeva never came to Nepal himself.)

The 19th century chronicles of Nepal expand on the story from the Talejvāgama and Tulyāgama. Following is the story of her origin from the Padmagiri chronicle dated to 1825:

Harisimha, the son of Rāmasimha, a Sūryavaṃśī (Note: Though 19th century Nepalese chronicles assign Solar ancestry to the Karnata Dynasty, the Karnāṭas themselves in their epigraphy claimed Lunar dynasty ancestry.) Rajah of Oudh, having left his own native country arrived in Simraungarh, and took up his lodgings in a separate fortress according to the instructions of a Rakṣas of Laṅkā. On a certain day he was ordered by the goddess to take her with him and proceed to the hills. He arrived and settled at Bhaktapur on Saturday, the 9th of Dussudi 1345 Śaka (A. D. 1323). The followers of Harisimha were 6 Kanauja Brahmans, 2 Ācharyas, 3 Khadgis or warriors/ butchers, 4 Rajikas or washermen, 5 Vaidyas, 6 Newārs, and 7 Tels or oilmen—that is, his followers were of those several castes; and when he finally settled in Bhaktapur, the Rajah of that place left his throne and gave it to Harisimha, who built a temple in the centre of the Darbar and placed in it the goddess Tulaja.

The Capuchin Cassiano Beligatti wrote in his journal from 1744 regarding Taleju: "In all of Nepal, the statue of Bhavani of Batgao is the most esteemed of the others, not only because it is of gold, but because they say it is descended from heaven".

=== Association with the Karnata Dynasty ===
The chronicles of Nepal from the 19th century all describe Taleju as originally being the tutelary goddess of the Karnata Dynasty of Mithila. However, this is largely seen as a construction of the chronicles themselves rather than being a historical source. The idea stems from a claim that the Malla Dynasty itself was descended from the Karnata Dynasty after Harisimhadeva fled his capital of Simraungadh after an invasion by the Delhi Sultanate and then entered Bhaktapur as a refugee and eventually took control of Nepal and established his tutelary goddess Taleju in Bhaktapur.

However, the philologist Brinkhaus discovered that the idea that Harisimhadeva was the ancestor of the Nepalese Mallas is not present in the earliest of the sources, like the Gopal Raj Vamshavali written in 1389, nor in any of the epigraphy from the earlier Malla kings. He also found that the descent claim is also inconsistent as the Mallas claim Solar Dynasty whereas the Karnata in their epigraphy claim a Lunar dynasty as their origin. The Gopal Raj Vamshavali instead gives the following account of the demise of Harisimhadeva:

In N.S. 446, on the day of Magha Sukla Trtiya, King Harasimha of Tirahuta, having assembled all his subjects, led an invading party from Mithila, and attacked the Turk of Delhi (Gayas-ud-din Tugalak). Simraungarha was destroyed. The King and ministers all deserted the place and ran away from there. After some time, they re-entered the place. After some time, when they were on their way to Rajagrama in Dolakha, King Harasimhadeva died in Timpata (Tinpatana). Both his minister and son were held in confinement. They asked for asylum. The noble of Rajagrama grabbed all their wealth.

Brinkhaus found that the claim actually first appears in Muditakuvalayāśva, a 1628 drama by Jagajjyoti Malla, king of Bhaktapur. In it, he presents his 14th-century ancestor Sthitirajmalla, whose ancestry is not given in any earlier source, as a direct descendant of Harisimhadeva through four intermediate kings: Harisimhadeva → Vallasimha → Devamalla → Nagamalla → Asokamalla → Jayasthiti Malla. These four kings are not attested in any earlier source and were most likely literary inventions of the king. In an earlier manuscript dated 1614, the same king had traced his ancestry only as far back as Yaksa Malla. The genealogy in the drama was later recorded in the 17th-century Sanskrit chronicle Nepalavamsavali. However, neither Jagajjyoti Malla's drama nor the Nepalavamsavali yet connects Taleju to Harisimhadeva.

The earliest sources to connect Harisimhadeva to Taleju are two 17th-century private genealogical texts of the Newar Brahmins, the Talejvāgama and the Tulyāgama. However, the story of the fall of Simraungadh, written down in 1740 by the Capuchin friar Cassiano Beligatti as told to him by the people of Bhaktapur, does not mention Taleju as belonging to Harisimhadeva. The story connecting Taleju and Harisimhadeva only took its full modern form only in the 19th-century chronicles.

== Identity ==
You are the gāyatri of the Vaidikas, Daughter of the Ocean (Laksmi) of the Vaisnavas, Mahesi of the Māhesvaras, according to the categories of doctrine on earth, vajravārāhi of the Saugata yogins (Buddhists) and, further, necessity of the mimāmsakas.

— Pratapa Malla describing Taleju in his Sanskrit poem Sarvāparādhastotra

Several scholars have cast doubts on the exact identity of Taleju. Zotter argued that the name "taleju" which he considered a locational epithet, veiled rather than revealed her identity and further argues that her name might "even serve as a generic term subsuming deities of different local origin that accreted within the Nepalese royal palaces over the course of time". The Indologist Alexis Sanderson based on his examination of the ritual manuals belonging to the Newar Brahamins dating to the Malla period proposed that Taleju may not have designated a specific deity but rather a designation applied to eithet Kubjika or Siddhilakṣmī. Sanderson considers Kubjika as the more probable identification of Taleju if she originally referred to a single goddess. Mary Slusser considers Taleju as a form of Durga, particularly in her aspect as mahiṣāsuramardinī supporting this identification through the goddess's anthropomorphic iconography, ritual practices of blood sacrifices to her during Mohani and the alternative names found in Malla period inscriptions: Kālikā, Caṇḍikā, Parameśvarī and Bhavānī.

The anthropologist Robert I. Levy considers Taleju as a manifestation of the supreme goddess within the religious system of Bhaktapur. He argues that though Taleju is often depicted as Durga or Bhagavati in her anthromoporhic form, the people of Bhaktapur maintain a distinction between Taleju and Bhagavati, with the priests of the Taleju temple in Bhaktapur describing Taleju as the "younger sister" of Bhagavati. Levy also notes that during the festival of Mohani, Taleju is assumed by the people of Bhaktapur, and her priests to temporarily assume the form of Bhagavati and Durga. Similarly, Lidke argues that Taleju represents the supreme goddess of Nepala Mandala, encompassing the identities of several power goddessess such as Guhyeshwari, Kubjika and Tripura Sundari.
