= Taleju Temple, Kathmandu =

Hindu temple in Kathmandu, Nepal

Taleju Temple
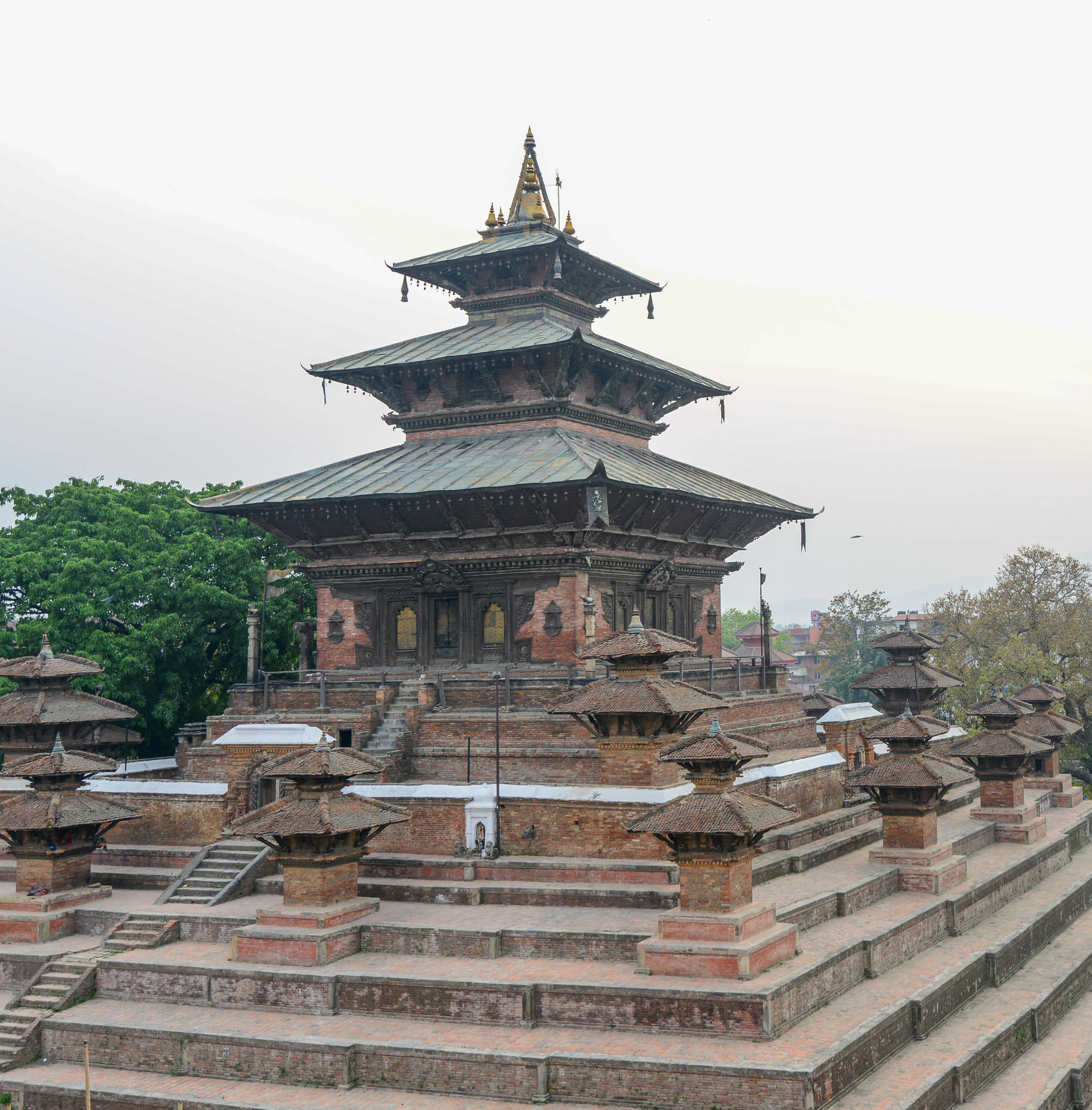

- Location within Bagmati Province Location within Nepal

Religion
- Affiliation: Hinduism
- District: Kathmandu
- Province: Bagmati
- Deity: Taleju Bhawani
- Festival: Dashain

Location
- Location: Kathmandu Durbar Square
- Country: Nepal
- Coordinates: 27.704871°N 85.308008°E

Architecture
- Creator: Mahendra Malla
- Established: 1564

Taleju Temple is a Hindu temple dedicated to Taleju Bhawani, the royal patron goddess of the Malla dynasty of Nepal. It was built in 1564 by Mahendra Malla and is located in Hanuman Dhoka, Kathmandu Durbar Square, a UNESCO World Heritage Site. Inside the temple, there is a shrine to Taleju Bhawani, and her human embodiment, the Kumari Devi. The Taleju Temple is only opened once a year on the occasion of Dashain.

== Gallery ==
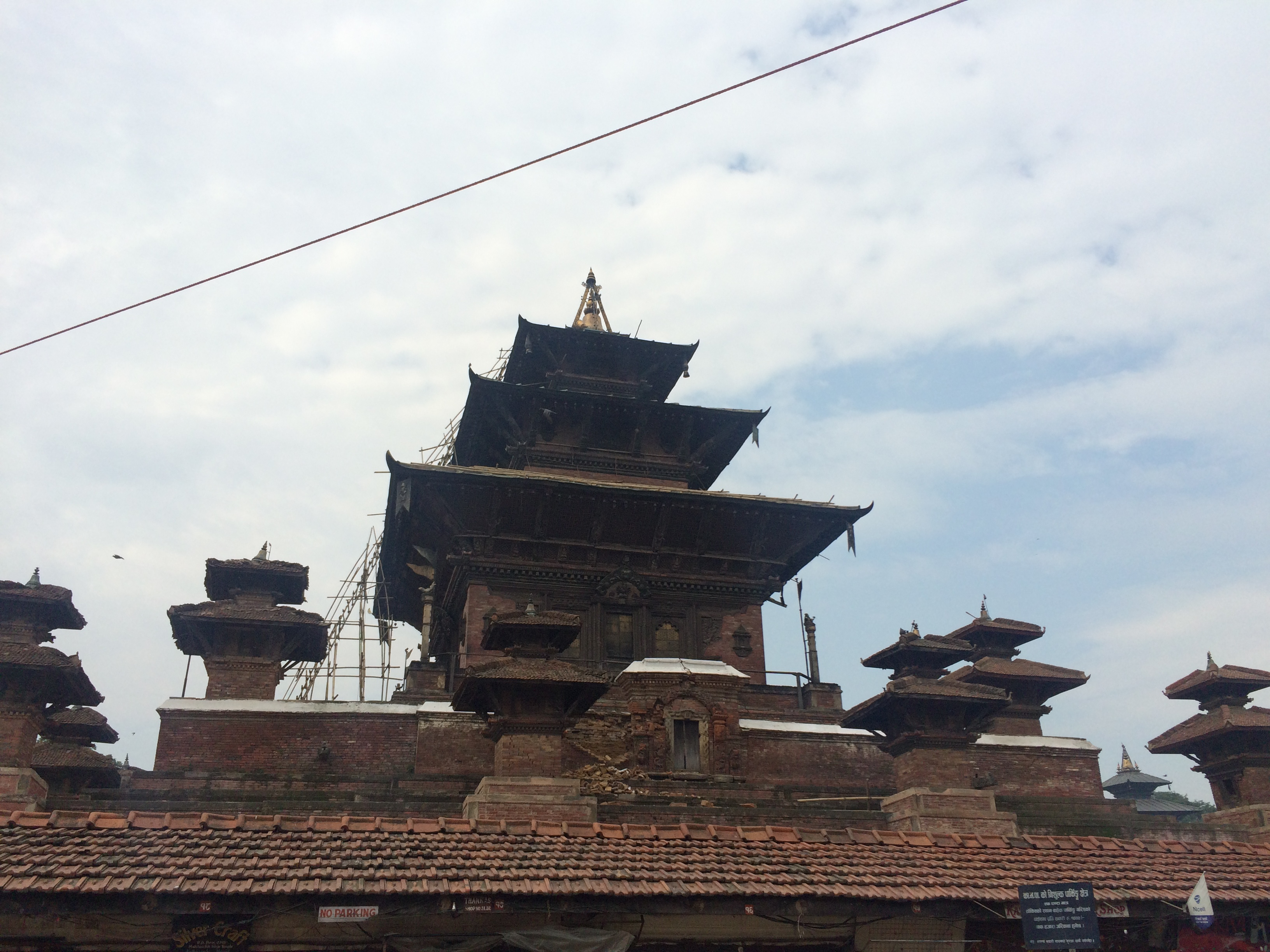
Taleju Temple after 2015 earthquake

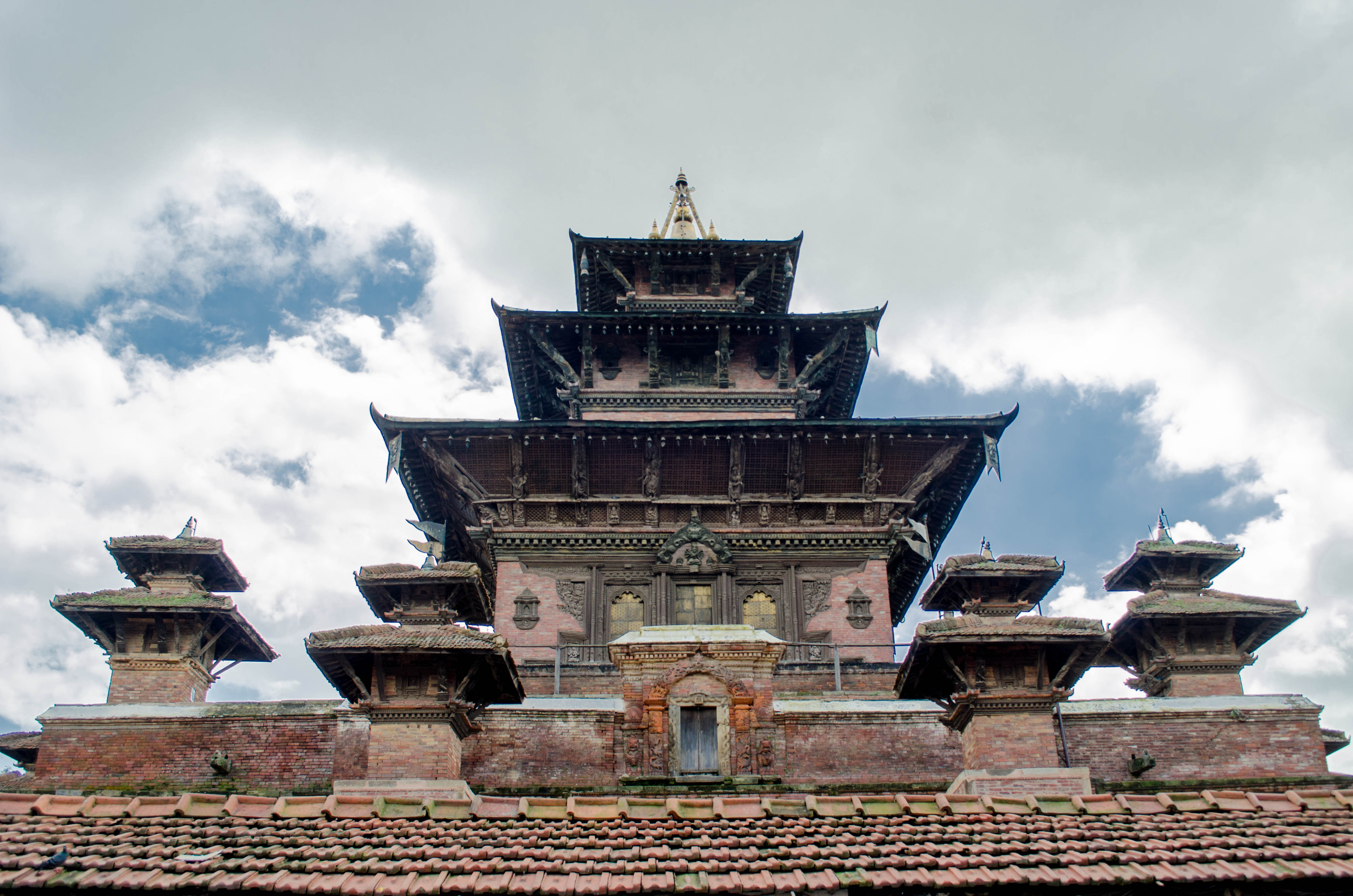

== Taleju Necklace ==
The Taleju Temple once contained the Taleju Necklace, a 17th-century Nepali ceremonial collar now in the collection of the Art Institute of Chicago, where it is known as the Necklace Inscribed with the Name of King Pratapamalladeva. In 1970, Nepalese authorities transferred several treasures from the temple, including the necklace, to the Hanuman Dhoka Palace Museum in Kathmandu for safekeeping. By 1976 the necklace had left Nepal and appeared in the United States, where it was sold by a Californian art dealer to the Alsdorf Foundation, a Chicago-based private collection. The necklace later entered the Art Institute of Chicago, where it has been exhibited ever since. Because of its association with the Taleju Temple, scholars and campaigners in Nepal have sought the necklace’s return. Media reports have raised the possibility that Nepal’s royal family was responsible for its sale.
