= Vaikuntha Kamalaja =

Composite form of Hindu deities Vishnu and Lakshmi

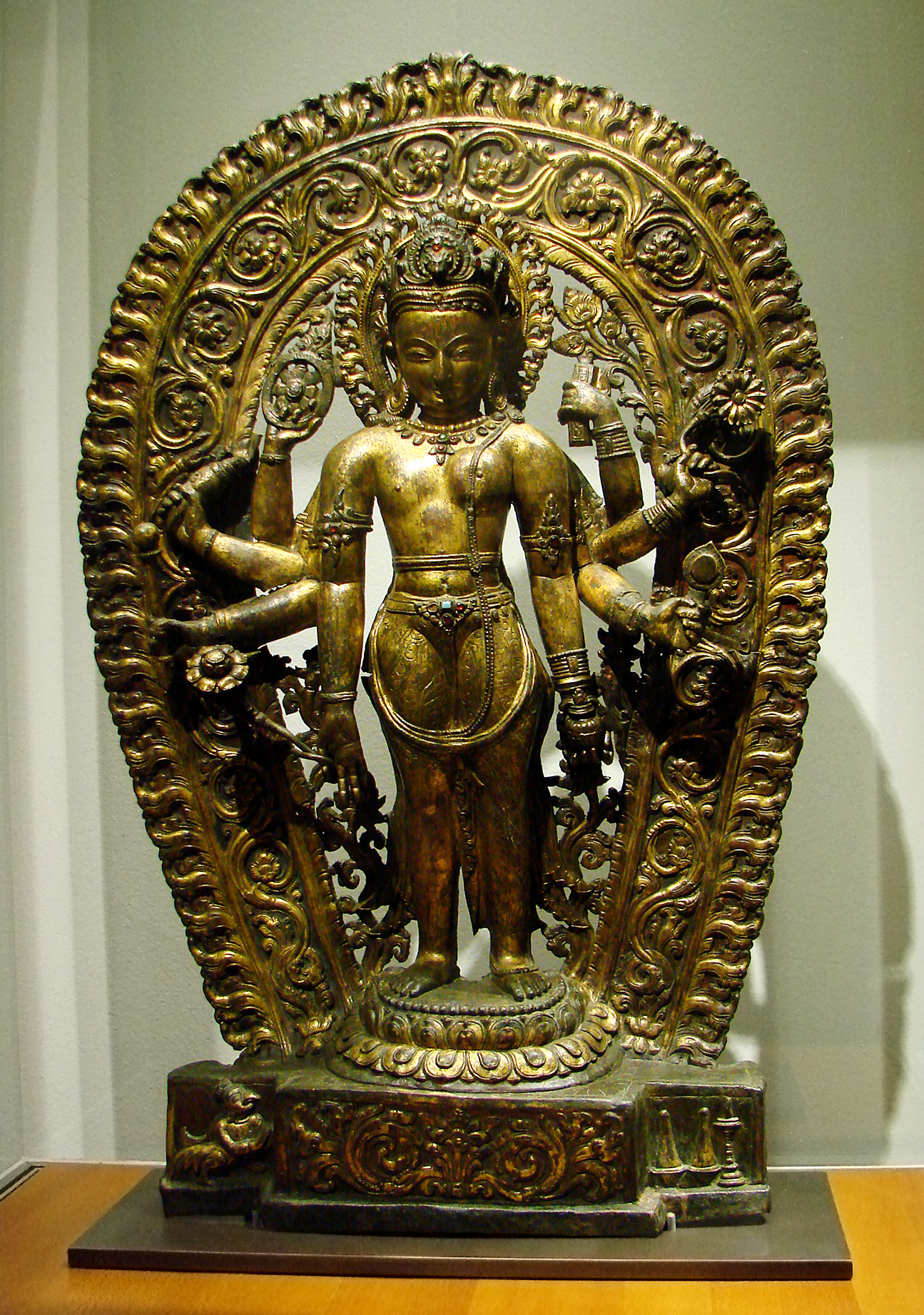
Vaikuntha-Kamalaja, Nepal, gilt copper and inlaid, 14th century, Guimet Museum.

Vaikuntha-Kamalaja (or Lakshmi-Narayana) is a composite androgynous form of the Hindu god Vishnu and his consort Lakshmi. It is also known as Ardhanari Narayana and Vasudeva Kamalaja. Vaikuntha-Kamalaja is a rare form, mostly restricted to Nepal and the Kashmir region of India.

Like Ardhanarishvara, Vaikuntha-Kamalaja is depicted as half male and half female, split down the middle. The right half is the male Vishnu, illustrating his traditional attributes. The icon symbolises the oneness or non-duality of male and female principles of the universe. Vaikuntha-Kamalaja is mentioned in few Tantric and iconographical texts.

== Names ==
The androgynous form of Vishnu is known by several names including: Vaikuntha Kamalaja, (Vaikuntha is the abode of Vishnu, here name of the Vishnu side and Kamalaja is "she who is born of a lotus" – Lakshmi), Vaishnava Ardhanari ("the Ardhanari – "half-woman" of the Vaishnava sect, which is dedicated to Vishnu), Ardhanari-Narayana ("Narayana (Vishnu) who is half-female"), Ardhanari-Vishnu ("Vishnu who is half-woman"), Ardha-Lakshmi-Narayana ("Vishnu who is half-Lakshmi"), Vasudeva-Kamalaja ("Vishnu-Lakshmi"), Vasudeva Lakshmi ("Vishnu-Lakshmi") and Ardha-Lakshmi-Hari ("Hari (Vishnu) who is half-Lakshmi").

== Development ==
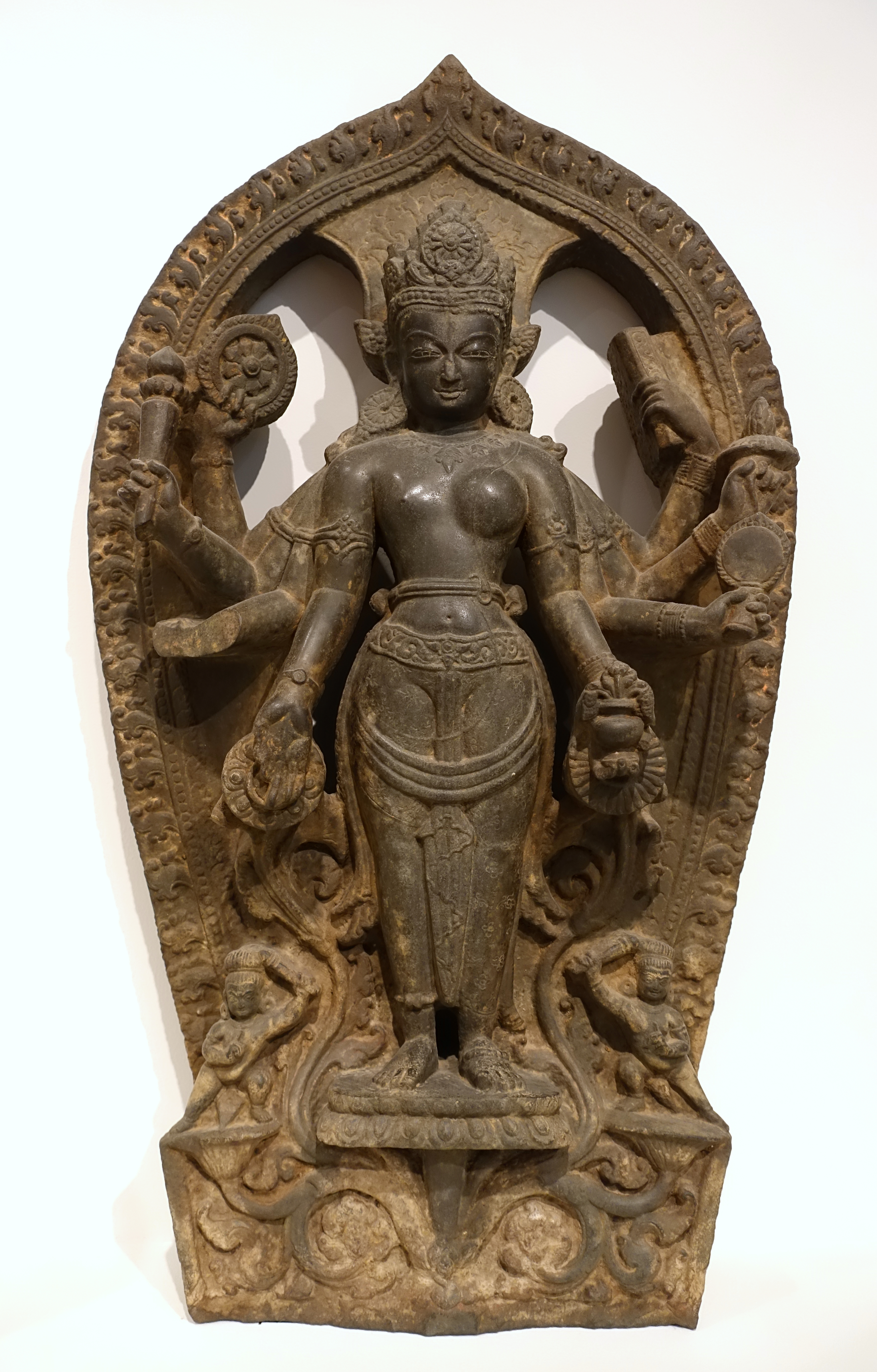
Lakshminarayana statue from Nepal, 10th-11th century (Lalitpur, Nepal).

The concept as well as iconography of Vaikuntha-Kamalaja is derived from Ardhanarishvara – the popular androgynous form of the god Shiva and his consort Parvati. P. Pal suggests that the concept of Vaikuntha-Kamalaja originated in Eastern India and then migrated to Nepal, however according to Deo, the concept originated in medieval Nepal, which D. C. Sircar refutes citing an 11th-century Gaya inscription. A late 11th century inscription of the local ruler Yakshapala in the Shitala Gaya Temple in Gaya, India says that Yakshapala built the temple to house a number of deities, including Kamalardhangina-Narayana, "Narayana (Vishnu) whose half body is Kamala ("Lakshmi"). According to another theory, Kashmir was the birthplace of Vaikuntha-Kamalaja. Although relevant Indian texts and icons of Vaikuntha-Kamalaja are found in Nepal, hardly any exist in India except Kashmir. Some notable Indian icons of Vaikuntha-Kamalaja are found at Bijbehara (late 10th–11th century), Anantnag, Kashmir; Jaintipur, Haryana; Baijnath Temple, Himachal Pradesh (1204 CE) and the Sayana Thakura icon of Jagannath Temple, Puri.

Vaikuntha-Kamalaja icons are found in Nepal since 13th century. The earliest known Nepali depiction of Vaikuntha-Kamalaja is in a 1263 AD pata (cloth panel), now in the Ramakrishna Mission Institute of Culture, Kolkata, India. Some Nepali bronze sculptures of Vaikuntha-Kamalaja are housed in some museums. Notable among Vaikuntha-Kamalaja icons are icons in Indreshvar Temple, Panauti; Narayan Temple, Patan and Saraswati Temple, Sankhu.

While Ardhanarishvara's legends and iconography are recalled in the Puranic scriptures, Vaikuntha-Kamalaja is not mentioned in them. The Vaikuntha-Kamalaja is hinted implicitly in many Pancharatra treatises and Tantric texts. Tantric iconographic texts like Saradatilaka (10th–11th century-in a dhyana mantra -a mantra mentioning a deity's iconic form), the 17th century Tantrasara of Krishnananda (in a dhyana mantra) as well as the 16th century Shilparatna mentions the iconography of this androgynous form of Vishnu.

== Iconography and symbolism ==
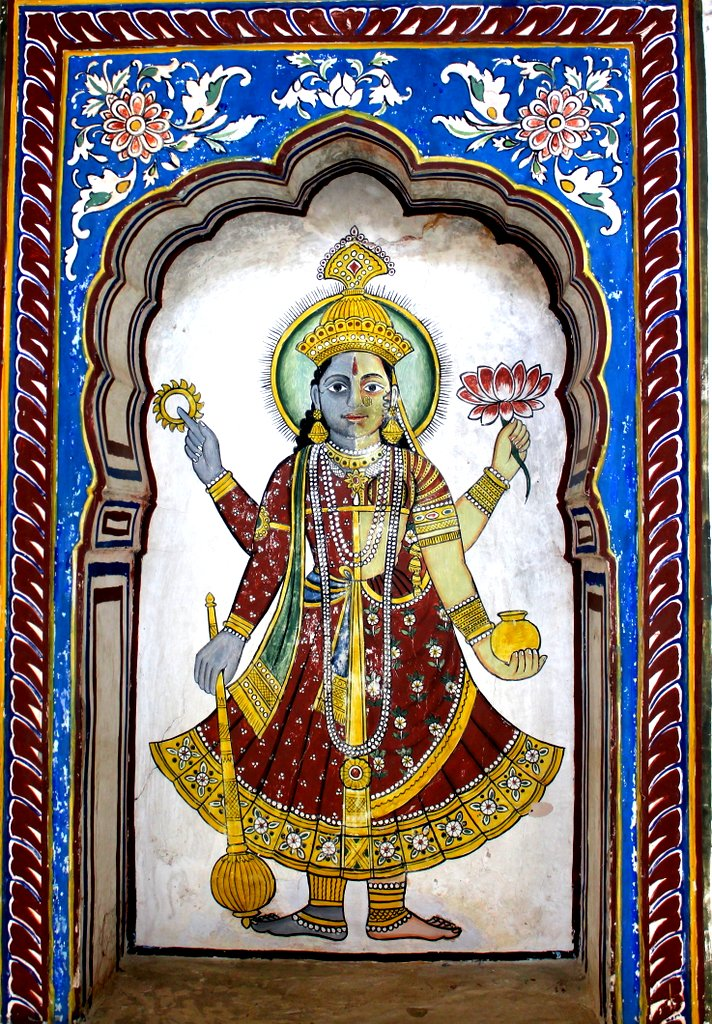
North Indian-style mural of Vaikuntha Kamalaja in Podar Haveli Museum, Nawalgarh, Rajasthan.

As explained in Saradatilaka and Tantrasara, Vaikuntha-Kamalaja, like Ardhanarishvara, symbolise the oneness or non-duality of male and female principles of the universe. The Shilparatna specifically talks about the oneness of Vishnu and Lakshmi. It also denotes the combination of Sat (truth) and Cit (consciousness), producing ananda (bliss) (See Satcitananda). Like Ardhanarishvara, the left half is female signifying Lakshmi, the right is the male Vishnu. The icon is depicted standing on a lotus pedestal or may be seated on the Garuda or Garuda (the vahana – mount – of Vishnu) as well as a tortoise or Kurma, often associated with Vishnu, but aligned with Lakshmi as her mount in this particular iconography. Sometimes, the Garuda and the tortoise may be depicted kneeling to the deity on male and female side respectively of the standing deity. Vaikuntha-Kamalaja is eight-armed, has a fuller female breast and a longer floral-patterned waist-garment on the left, while the male half wears a plain shorter waist-garment up to the knee or a same length garment but with a different design. The Vishnu half holds the four traditional attributes of Vishnu: chakra(discus), shankha (conch), gada (mace) and lotus. The female half holds a kalasha (coconut-mango leaves atop a pot) or kumbha (water-pot) filled with gems, mirror, manuscript or book and a lotus. The goddess side may also hold a bell or a rosary. The manuscript and mirror are never associated with Lakshmi's iconography, however they are traditionally associated with other goddesses, suggesting their influence on the iconography of female side. The manuscript is the attribute of goddess Sarasvati, while the mirror is the traditional attribute of Parvati, especially in Ardhanarishvara icons. The necklace, anklets, waist-belt are common on both sides; the ear-rings, shape of the crown and arm ornaments differ.

== See also ==
- Ardhanarishvara
- Jumadi
- Lakshmi Narayana
- Harishankari
