= Mary Shepherd Slusser =

American archaeologist (1918–2017)

Mary Shepherd Slusser (1918–2017) was an American archaeologist known for her work in Nepal, where she lived and worked alongside local professionals including Sanskritists and historians.

She and her colleagues uncovered information about the art, architecture, language, epigraphy, and cultural history of the Newal community in the Kathmandu Valley. Slusser also uncovered the chronology of Nepalese artworks, which in turn allowed her to better define the geographical boundaries of ancient towns and cities in the Kathmandu Valley.

Slusser's collection of Nepalese artifacts (now mostly dispersed across several museums in the United States) was less well-known to her contemporaries, and became the subject of scrutiny in 2026, when an investigation in Himal Southasian found that she had knowingly purchased and sold stolen objects.

== Life and career ==
Slusser was born in Ontario, Canada in 1918 to George Percy and Ethel Mary Shepherd. In the year following her birth, her family moved to rural Michigan. Her mother hunted for food while her father worked in a machine shop. She developed an interest in archaeology as a young child when she and her sister, Dorothy, would play with souvenirs sent to their mother from around the world by her first husband, a British sailor. These souvenirs included Chinese ceramics, Japanese figurines made of ivory, an ebony elephant from India and a tiger skin, head included.

When Slusser was 17 years old, she became a naturalized citizen of the U.S. She attended the University of Michigan alongside her sister. Mary Shepherd Slusser met her future husband, Robert, a US Navy sailor while attending the University of Michigan. In 1942, she graduated with a bachelor's degree and moved to New York City, following her sister, who was enrolled in a graduate program at New York University's Institute of Fine Arts. In 1950, Slusser graduated with her PhD in anthropology from Columbia University. The title of her dissertation was "Preliminary archeological studies of Northern Central Chile" and she completed some of her coursework at both NYU and Harvard University.

After the completion of her PhD in 1950, Slusser worked for the U.S. State Department as a research analyst. Her work with the state department, from 1951– 1958, focused mainly on Latin America and Southeast Asia. During this time, her husband was working for the U.S. State Department as well, specifically as an economist with USAID. Eventually, his work took him overseas, and Slusser accompanied him on his travels.

The couple arrived in Nepal in 1965 and remained there for more than six years. There, she learned to speak Nepali fluently. At the request of the Department of Anthropology of the Smithsonian's National Museum of Natural History, Slusser assembled a small ethnographic collection from the Kathmandu Valley. Her research in Nepal subsequently developed into a broader study of the region's history, art, architecture, and cultural traditions, culminating in the publication of Nepal Mandala: A Cultural Study of the Kathmandu Valley in 1982.

Slusser continued to work in museums until retirement. This work included a three- year stint from 1975–1978 as curatorial assistant at the Museum of African Art, where she had previously and briefly worked in 1971, and a postdoctoral fellowship at the Freer Gallery of Art and Arthur M. Sackler Gallery in 1989. While working on her fellowship, she was invited back to Kathmandu to supervise the creation of the Patan Museum, a museum devoted to the art of Nepal. Upon completion of her fellowship, Slusser was asked to stay with the museum. She maintained her position as an unpaid research associate for the remainder of her career.

Throughout her career, Slusser made many contributions to the understanding of Nepalese culture, history, language, and art. She has multiple published works which reflect her career including a two- volume set of text and images, mainly her own photographs from her time in Nepal, titled Nepal Mandala: A Cultural Study of Kathmandu Valley and a book, which she co- authored with Paul Jett, on Nepalese art titled The Antiquity of Nepalese Wood Carving: a Reassessment. Articles published by her alongside her co-authors include, "Metamorphosis: Sheet Metal to Sacred Image in Nepal", "The Nepalese Caitya: 1500 Years of Buddhist Votive Architecture in the Kathmandu Valley", "The Devimahatmya Paintings Preserved at the National Archives", "The Purandi Hoard: Metalwork from Eleventh-Century Nepal", "Water Conduits in the Kathmandu Valley".

== Collecting practices in Nepal ==
While living in Nepal between 1965 and 1972, Slusser accumulated a collection of "roughly 500" Nepalese art and ethnographic objects, mostly from street salesmen and artifact dealers. At the request of the Department of Anthropology of the Smithsonian Institution's National Museum of Natural History, she assembled a small ethnographic collection from the Kathmandu Valley. She and her husband, H. Robert Slusser, also acquired Nepalese artworks and religious objects for their own collection. Some objects from their private collection were later donated to the Arthur M. Sackler Gallery.

In September 2026, art historian Erin L. Thompson published an investigation in Himal Southasian examining Slusser's private collecting practices in Nepal. Drawing in part on Slusser's diaries and archival materials, Thompson reported that Slusser knew many of the devotional objects she collected to be stolen. Slusser brought her collection back to the United States, selling parts of it during her lifetime and bequeathing the rest to museums including LACMA, the Virginia Museum of Fine Arts, and the National Museum of Natural History. Thompson characterized Slusser's collection practices as "loot". Slusser feared that traditional Nepalese culture and faith would be lost to modernization, and believed that she was "rescuing" the artifacts she purchased.

Slusser extensively documented her collecting practices in her diaries. For instance, after she purchased a statue at the Gokarneshwor Mahadev temple in December 1965, she wrote that she was "sure [the sellers] had just stolen" the image, noting that grains of ritual rice remained attached to it. In other instances, Slusser complained of having to scrub off puja anointing powders from Devas she purchased. Thompson reported that some of the items Slusser purchased from dealers may have been stolen explicitly to be sold to her: although she frequently haggled, the prices she paid were still far higher than the monthly and even yearly wages of most Nepalis. In at least one case, the theft of an artifact Slusser purchased (a set of bone regalia) caused the specific Guthi ritual tradition associated with the regalia to go extinct. Slusser was aware that the theft and export of such antiquities was strictly prohibited by Nepalese law, but avoided customs inspection by mailing her collection back to the U.S. through the Army Post Office in Kathmandu.

Smithsonian collection records independently document Nepalese objects formerly owned by the Slussers. Provenance records for some objects identify purchases made in Kathmandu, while records for other objects identify the Slussers as previous owners but list the method by which they acquired the objects as unknown.
