= Pratapaditya Pal =

Indian-American art historian and curator

Pratapaditya Pal is an Indian scholar of Southeast Asian and Himalayan art and culture, specializing particularly in the history of art of India, Nepal and Tibet. He has served as a curator of South Asian art at several prominent US museums including Boston's Museum of Fine Arts, the Los Angeles County Museum of Art, and the Art Institute of Chicago, where he has organized more than 22 major exhibitions and helped build the museums' collection . He has also written over 60 books and catalogs, and over 250 articles on the subject, taught at several universities, and served as the editor of the Indian art magazine, Marg. In 2009 he was awarded Padma Shri by the Government of India for his contributions to the study of Indian art.

== Early life and education ==
Pal was born in Bengal, British India and received his early schooling in Shillong, Darjeeling and Calcutta. Studying at the University of Calcutta, he hoped to specialize in anthropology, but the university didn't offer any courses in the area in 1957, and he instead obtained a Master of Arts degree in ancient Indian history and culture. He continued at the university to earn a PhD in the history of Nepali architecture in 1962. He then won a scholarship to Cambridge University, where in 1965 he earned a second PhD in Nepali sculpture and painting. However he failed to get a teaching job in India, and moved to the US instead.

== Career ==
In 1967 Pal was appointed the curator of the Indian art collection at Boston Museum, a position that had previously been held by Ananda Coomaraswamy. In 1969, he moved to the Los Angeles County Museum of Art, which was then beginning to develop its own collection of Indian art. Pal joined as the head of department of Indian and Islamic art, and subsequently served as the museum's acting director (1979–80) and as the senior curator of Indian and Southeast Asian art from 1981. Los Angeles Times art writer Suzanne Muchnic described his legacy as building the museum's collection from "a handful of items to about 4,000 pieces, giving LACMA one of the nation's preeminent holdings of Indian and Southeast Asian art."

In 1995, Pal was appointed visiting curator of Indian, Himalayan and Southeast Asian Art at The Art Institute of Chicago. He moved to Norton Simon Museum, Pasadena, California in 2003. During the mid-1970s Pal had advised Norton Simon on acquiring Asian art for that museum.

== Writings ==
Books and catalogs

- Indian Sculpture, (catalog of the LACMA collections): Volume 1 (to 700 AD, 1992), Volume II (700-1800, 1988), University of California Press
- The Elegant Image: Bronzes from the Indian Subcontinent in the Siddharth K. Bhansali Collection, New Orleans Museum of Art (2011).
- Goddess Durga: The Power and The Glory, Marg Publications (2009).
- Asian Art at the Norton Simon Museum, Vol. I. Art from the Indian Subcontinent, Yale University Press (2003).
- The Holy Cow and Other Animals: A Selection of Indian Paintings from the Art Institute of Chicago (with Betty Seid), Art Institute of Chicago (2002).
- The Art and Architecture of Ancient Kashmir, Marg Publications (1989)
- Icons of Piety, Images of Whimsy: Asian Terra Cottas from the Walter Grounds Collection, LACMA (1987).
- From Merchants to Emperors: British Artists and India, 1757–1930 (with Vidya Dahejia), Cornell University Press (1986).
- Light of Asia: Buddha Sakyamuni in Asian Art, LACMA (1984)
- Tibetan Paintings: A Study of Tibetan Thankas, Eleventh to Nineteenth Centuries, Sotheby Publications (1984).
- Art of Tibet: A Catalogue of the Los Angeles County Museum of Art Collection, University of California Press (1984).
- A Buddhist Paradise: The Murals of Alchi, Western Himalayas (with Lionel Fournier), Visual Dharma Publications (1982).
- The Classical Tradition in Rajput Painting from the Paul F. Walter Collection, Pierpont Morgan Library (1978).
- The Sensual Immortals: A Selection of Sculptures from the Pan-Asian Collection , MIT Press (1977).
- Nepal: Where the Gods are Young, Asia Society (1976).
- Bronzes of Kashmir, Akademische Druck- und Verlagsanstalt (1975)
- The Arts of Nepal. Part I. Sculpture, EJ Brill (1974).
- Aspects of Indian Art. Papers Presented in a Symposium at the Los Angeles County Museum of Art, October 1970 (editor), EJ Brill (1972).
- The Art of Tibet, Asia Society (1969).

== Awards and recognition ==
- Padma Shri, 2009.
- The Pratapaditya Pal Senior Lectureship in Curating and Museology in Asian Art created at School of Oriental and African Studies at London University
