= Jan Brinkhuis =

Dutch mathematician (born 1952)

Jan Brinkhuis (born 1952) is a Dutch mathematician, and associate professor of Finance and Mathematical Methods and Techniques at the Econometric Institute of Erasmus University Rotterdam, specialized in the theory and application of optimization theory and game theory.

Born in Veenendaal, Brinkhuis received his PhD in mathematics in 1981 at King's College London under supervisor of Albrecht Fröhlich with the thesis Embedding Problems and Galois Modules. After graduation, he started his academic career as research associate at King's College London on a SERC grant. In 1983 he moved back to The Netherlands and joined the Econometric Institute of Erasmus University Rotterdam. Since early 2000s Brinkhuis is also teacher at the Tinbergen Institute.

In 2000 Brinkhuis was awarded Education and Research award by the Erasmus University Rotterdam, and in 2009 he was elected Tinbergen Professor of the Year 2008/2009 by the first-year students. In 2005 Brinkhuis and Vladimir Tikhomirov wrote Optimization: Insights and Applications an introduction to mathematical optimization, published by Princeton University Press.

== Publications ==
Books

- 1981. Embedding Problems and Galois Modules. PhD thesis King's College London.
- 1986. Normal integral bases and complex conjugation. Econometric Institute.
- 2005. Optimization: Insights and Applications, Jan Brinkhuis and Vladimir Tikhomirov, Princeton University Press

Articles, a selection:

- 1983. "Non-repetitive sequences on three symbols." Quarterly Journal of Mathematics 34.2: 145–149.
- 1992. "On the Galois module structure over CM-fields." manuscripta mathematic 75.1 (1992): 333–347.
