= Horst Brinkhaus =

German Indologist

Horst Brinkhaus is a German Indologist. He was a German professor of Indology at University of Kiel until the closure of Indology at that university in 2014. He is a specialist in Sanskrit, Nepali, and Newar literature. From 1979 to 1981 and 1983 to 1985 he was director of the German Nepal Manuscript Preservation project. He completed his Habilitation at the University of Hamburg in 1985. In the words of Leonard W. J. van der Kuijp he is at the "vanguard of Indo-Nepalese and Nepalese studies".

== Publications ==
- Jagatprakāśamallas Mūladevaśaśidevavyākhyānanāṭaka : das älteste bekannte vollständig überlieferte Newari-Drama. Stuttgart : F. Steiner Verlag, 1987.
- The Pradyumna-Prabhāvatī legend in Nepal : a study of the Hindu myth of the draining of the Nepal Valley. Stuttgart: F. Steiner Verlag, 1987.
- Horst Brinkhaus: Cyclical Determinism and the development of the trimūrti-doctrine. In: Brockington/ Schreiner 1999, p. 35-47.
- Horst Brinkhaus: Book Review of Adriaensen/Bakker/Isaacson 1998 (The Skandapurāṇa. Volume I. Adhyāyas 1-25) and Bakker/Isaacson 2004 (The Skandapurāṇa. Volume IIA. Adhyāyas 26–31.14). Indo-Iranian Journal 48,3-4 (2005) 281–288.
- Horst Brinkhaus: Book Review of Kölver 2003 (Das Weltbild der Hindus herausgegeben von Adalbert Gail). Indo-Iranian Journal 50,3 (2007) 311–316.
- Horst Brinkhaus: 'Weltuntergang' (pralaya, pratisaṃcara etc. ) in den Purāṇas. In: Preisendanz 2007, p. 653-666.
- Horst Brinkhaus: The 'Purāṇization' of the Nepalese Māhātmya Literature. In: Koskikallio 2009, p. 303-311.
- Horst Brinkhaus: Tolerance and Syncretism in the Religious History of the Kathmandu Valley. In: Lienhard 1996, p. 137-147.
- Horst Brinkhaus: Book Review of Bisschop 2006 (Early Śaivism and the Skandapurāṇa. Sects and Centres). Indo-Iranian Journal 54,3 (2011) 296–300.
- Horst Brinkhaus: Book Review of Bailey 2008 (Gaṇeśapurāṇa. Part II: Krīḍākhaṇḍa. Translation, Notes and Index). Indo-Iranian Journal 56,2 (2013) 179–185.
