= Erin L. Thompson =

American art historian and lawyer

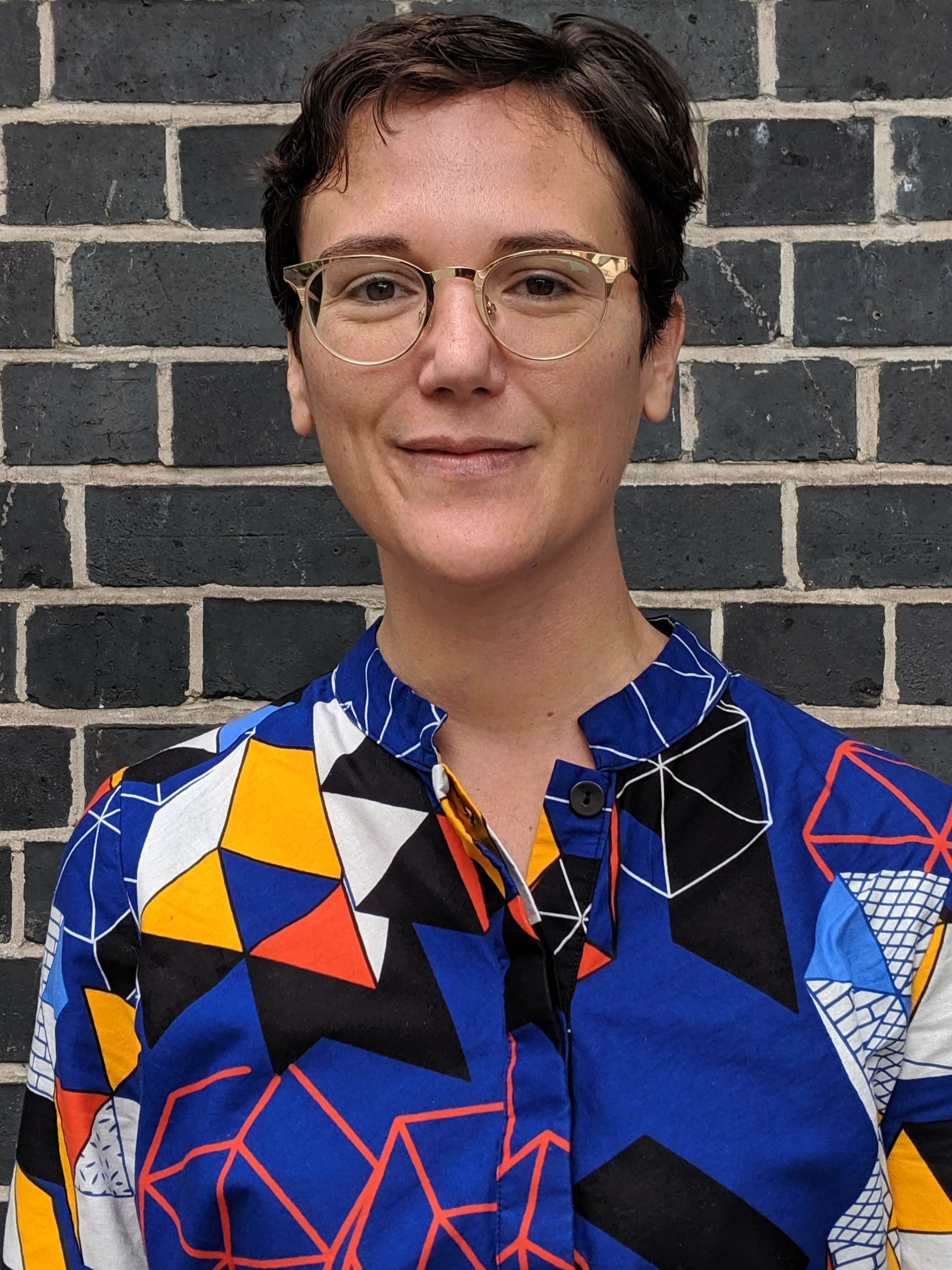
- Erin L. Thompson in London, 2019

Academic background
- Education: Barnard College (BA); Columbia University (JD, PhD)

Academic work
- Discipline: Art history
- Sub-discipline: Art theft, art crime
- Institutions: Columbia University

Erin L. Thompson is an American art historian and lawyer. She is a professor in the Department of Art and Music at the John Jay College of Criminal Justice (City University of New York). She studies art crime, including antiquities looting, the deliberate destruction of art, and art produced by detainees at the Guantánamo Bay military detention camp.

== Career ==
Thompson graduated from Barnard College in 2002. She holds a J.D. from Columbia Law School and a Ph.D. in art history from Columbia University. She has written about art theft, repatriation cases, and ISIS destruction of ancient art and archeological sites like Palmyra, Syria. She has given a TEDx talk on "Terrorists and Archeologists: How the Past Belongs to the Present". Thompson also testified as an expert witness in the 5Pointz graffiti art case.

In 2015, Thompson co-curated the exhibit "The Missing: Rebuilding the Past" at the Andrew and Anya Shiva Gallery, John Jay College. This included works by artists and scholars, such as Morehshin Allahyari, who protest ISIS and other forms of destruction of the past through creative protests and reconstructions.

In 2017, Thompson co-curated the exhibit "Ode to the Sea: Art from Guantánamo" at the President’s Gallery, John Jay College, New York. The exhibit included works created at Guantánamo Bay Detention Camp by eight detainees. Due to the response to the exhibit, the Pentagon prohibited any further artwork from leaving Guantánamo. Thompson appeared on The Opposition with Jordan Klepper to defend the exhibit.

In June 2020, during the protests following the murder of George Floyd, Thompson caught the attention of Fox News commentator Tucker Carlson, when she publicly commented on a video showing protesters preparing to tear down a Minneapolis statue of Christopher Columbus, saying that, "I'm a professor who studies the deliberate destruction of cultural heritage and I just have to say... use chain instead of rope and it'll go faster."

In September 2026, Himal Southasian published an investigation by Thompson into the legacy of American scholar Mary Slusser, examining archival records that indicated Slusser had acquired and exported hundreds of sacred and historical artefacts from Nepal while building her reputation as a leading expert on the country's cultural heritage. The investigation explored the role of scholars and museums in the international movement of cultural objects and its implications for heritage preservation and repatriation efforts in Nepal.

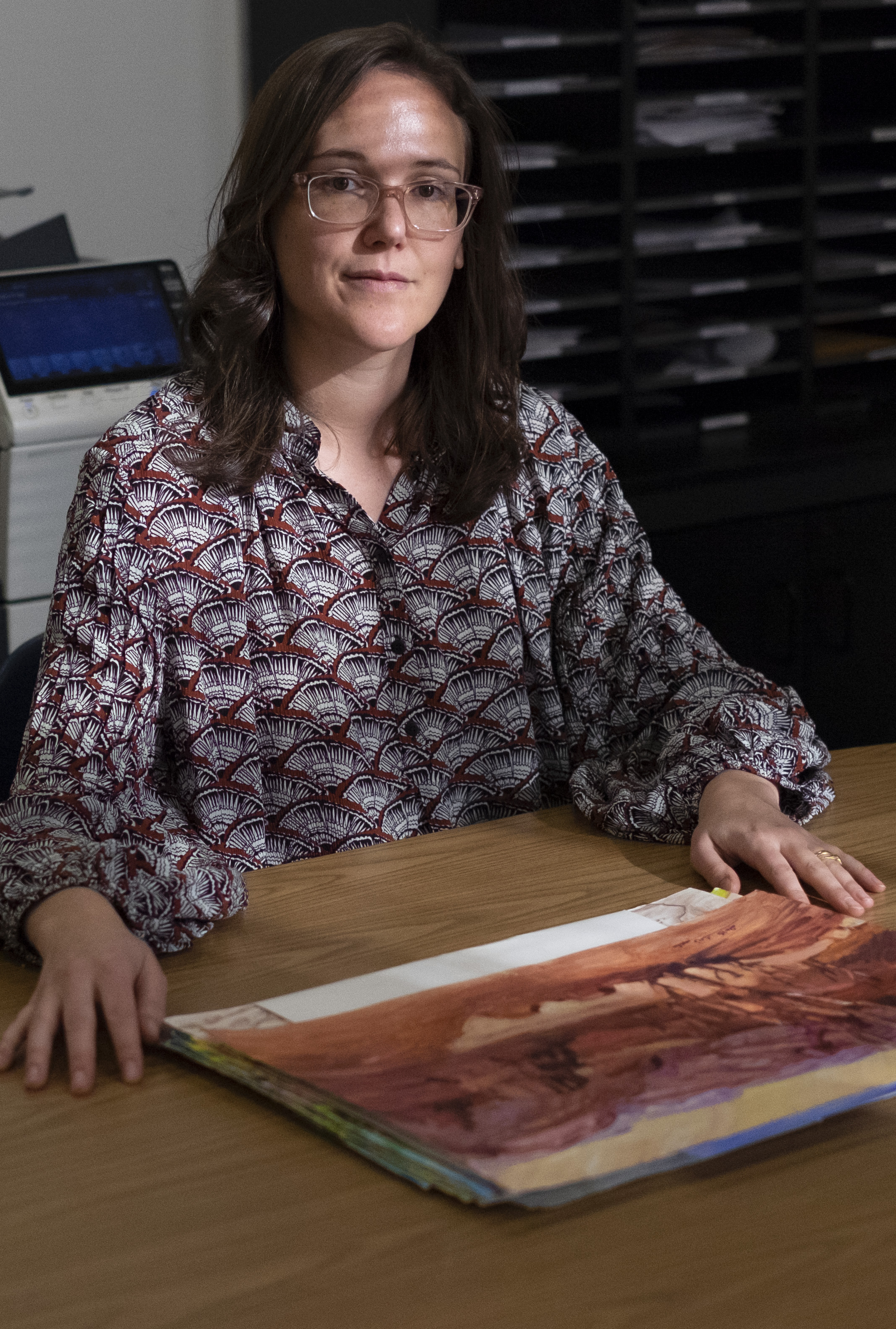
Thompson with artwork made at Guantanamo at John Jay College in 2018

== Bibliography ==
=== Books ===
- Possession: The Curious History of Private Collectors from Antiquity to the Present (Yale, 2016). ISBN 9780300208528
- Smashing Statues: The Rise and Fall of America's Public Monuments (W. W. Norton & Company, 2023) ISBN 9781324050490

=== Op-Eds ===
- “Op Ed: Egypt’s Looted Antiquities,” The New York Times (May 30, 2014).
- “Op Ed: Restrict Imports of Antiquities from Syria to Cut Down on Looting,” New York Times (October 9, 2014).
- “Op Ed: Islamic State’s War on Art Turns a Profit,” Bloomberg View (May 18, 2015).
- "Op Ed: Art Censorship at Guantánamo Bay," The New York Times (November 27, 2017).

=== Articles ===
- "If We Return Nazi-Looted Art, The Same Goes for Empire-Looted," Aeon (July 5, 2016).
- "Why People Collect Art," Aeon (August 23, 2016).
- "Palmyra in Winter," The Kenyon Review (July/August 2017).
- "Hobby Lobby’s Antiquities Trouble," Sapiens (July 10, 2017).
- "Art from Guantánamo," The Paris Review (October 2, 2017).
- "What We Can Learn From Art Painted Inside Guantánamo," The Nation (December 4, 2017).
- "Mary Slusser’s secret loot of Nepal’s sacred art and heritage," Himal Southasian (September 16, 2026)
