= Ancestors of Rama =

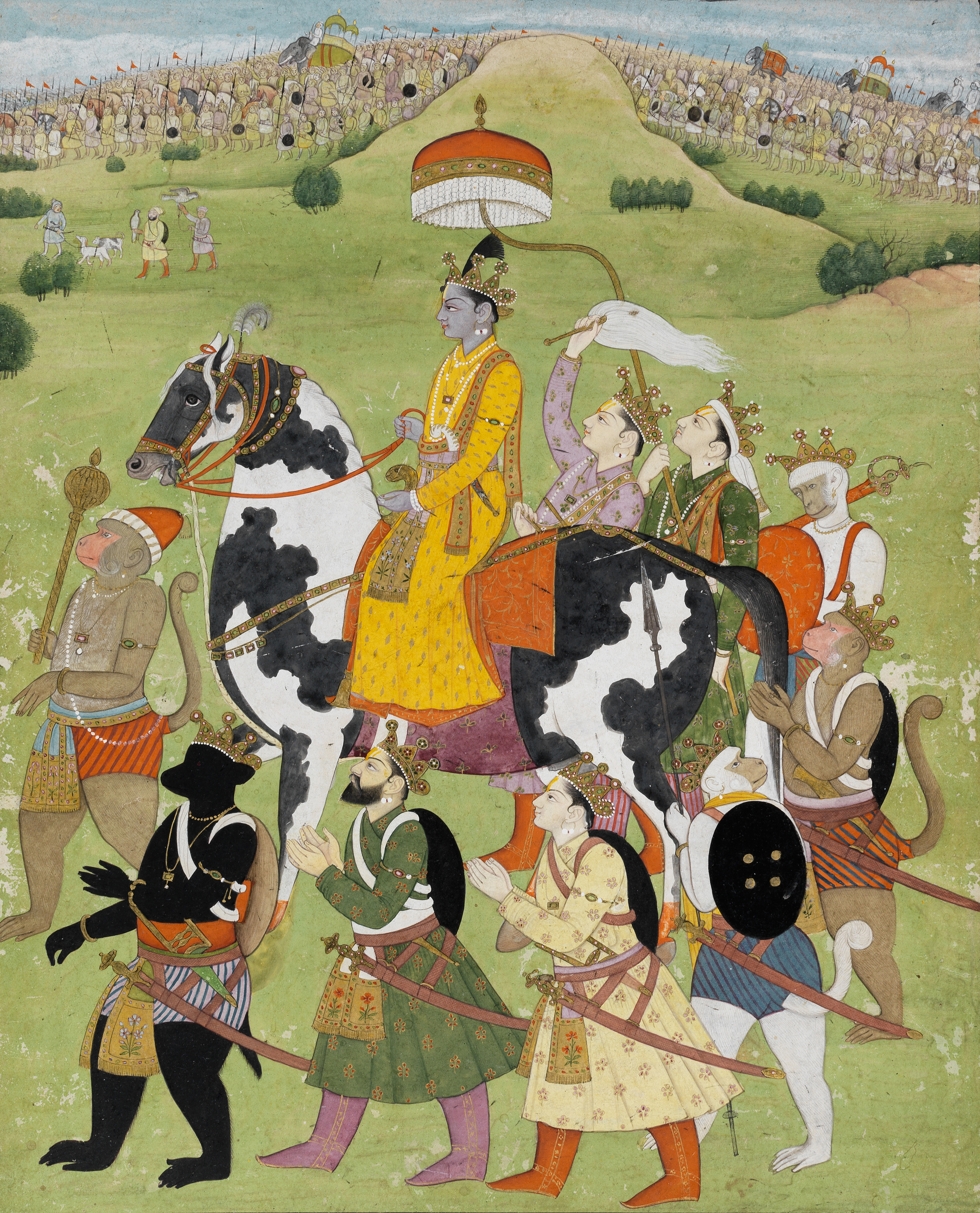
Painting of Rama returning to Ayodhya

The ancestors of Shree Ram, the protagonist of the Ramayan, are described below according to Vishnu Puran and Valmiki Ramayan. The famous personalities of Suryavansh as per the Vishnu Puran, Valmiki Ramayan, Ramakatha Rasavahini, Bhagavat Puran, and Raghuvansh Charitram are Ikshvaku, Vikushi, Kakust, etc. According to Hinduism, the city of Kosala and Ayodhya were founded by Manu (the earliest Prajapati) and by his son Ikshvaku, whose descendant was Shree Ram.

== Lineage ==
Brahma → Marichi → Kashyapa → Vivasvan → Vaivasvata Manu → Ikshvaku → Kukshi → Vikukshi (Shashada) → Bana → Anaranya → Prithu → Trishanku → Dhundhumara → Yuvanashva → Mandhata → Susandhi → Dhruvasandhi → Bharata → Asita → Sagara → Asamanja → Amsuman → Dilipa → Bhagiratha → Kakutstha → Raghu → Pravriddha (Kalmashapada) → Shankhana → Sudarshana → Agnivarna → Shighraga → Maru → Prashushruka → Ambarisha → Nahusha → Yayati → Nabhaga → Aja → Dasharatha → Shree Ram.
