= Kalmashapada =

King in Hindu mythology

Information
- Race: Ikshvaku dynasty
- Family: Sudasa (father)
- Spouse: Madayanti
- Children: Asmaka (acknowledged son, born by Vashistha)

Kalmashapada (Sanskrit: कल्माषपाद, romanized: Kalmāṣapāda), is a king In Hindu scriptures, who was cursed to be a rakshasa (demon) by the sage Shakti. He is speculated as an ancestor of Rama, the avatar of the god Vishnu and the hero of the Hindu epic Ramayana.

Many texts narrate how Kalmashapada was cursed to die if he had intercourse with his queen, so he obtained a son from Vashishtha by niyoga, an ancient tradition whereby a husband can nominate another man to impregnate his wife. Kalmashapada's story is narrated in various works, including the classic epic poems Mahabharata and Ramayana, and the Puranas.

== Description ==
The Mahabharata and the Puranas agree that Kalmashapada was the son of the king Sudasa (Sudhasana); however, the Ramayana names his father was Raghu, a king whom the other texts identify as a descendant of Kalmashapada. All texts agree that his ancestors include Sagara and Bhagiratha, though the generations between Bhagiratha and Kalmashapada may vary among the texts. The Padma Purana states that he was the son of Rituparna, the contemporary Solar king of Nala-Damayanti (even a character in their story).

Some texts state that Kalmashapada's birth name was Mitrasaha, but he was known by his patronymic Saudasa. A commentator on the Vishnu Purana says that Mitra-saha (literally, "one who forbears a friend") is an epithet the king acquires from the curse of the sage Vashishtha. The king restrains (saha) himself from retaliation against his friend (mitra) Vashishtha's curse, though he possesses the power to do so. The Vayu Purana, the Agni Purana, the Brahma Purana, and the Harivamsa call him Amitrasaha, "one who forbears (saha) a foe (amitra)"; here, Vashishtha is taken to be an enemy.

Kalmashapada was the king of Ayodhya (Kosala) and was married to Queen Madayanti. The Bhagavata Purana notes that she was also known as Damayanti.

== Legend ==
=== Shakti's curse ===
The Mahabharata narrates that once, Kalmashapada was roaming the forest for hunting. He encounters the sage Vashishtha's eldest son, Shakti, on a narrow path. As a kshatriya (a member of the military class), Kalmashapada does not make way for Shakti, a Brahmin (a member of the priesthood class). Nevertheless, Shakti refuses to budge. Finally, an enraged Kalmashapada hits Shakti with his whip. In turn, the sage curses the king to wander the forest for 16 years. The sage Vishvamitra, the arch-enemy of Vashishtha who desires to have Kalmashapada as his disciple, sends a rakshasa (named Kinkara) to possess the king's body. Vishvamitra plots to destroy his enemy's family with the help of the king. Under the influence of the rakshasa, the king serves human flesh to a Brahmin, who sets Shakti's curse into effect. The king turns into a cannibalistic rakshasa.

=== Vashishtha's curse ===
The Uttara Kanda of the Ramayana and the Shiva Purana narrate about Vashishtha cursing Kalmashapada with slight variation. The Uttara Ramayana tells that once, while hunting in the forest, Kalmashapada mistakenly kills a rakshasa disguised as a tiger cub. His fellow rakshasa – who was also disguised as a cub – assumes his true form and warns the king that he will take his revenge against the wrongful death at the proper time. The Shiva Purana and the Bhagavata Purana identify the other rakshasa as the brother of the slain one, and does not mention the tiger cub disguise. The Vishnu Purana also notes that the demons appeared in the form of tigers.

The king returns to his capital and invites his guru Vashishtha to the ashvamedha sacrifice. The sage accepts. The vengeful rakshasa assumes the form of the sage and informs the king that he secretly desires to eat meat (a taboo for sages), and that the king should come to his ashrama and offer him meat. Deceived by the rakshasa's disguise, Kalmashapada with his queen goes to Vashishtha's ashram and presents him with meat. The sage feels insulted seeing the taboo offering, and curses the king to be a rakshasa.

In the Shiva Purana, the Bhagavata Purana, and the Vishnu Purana, the rakshasa disguises himself as a Brahmin cook and gains entry to the king's kitchen. When Vashishtha arrives in Ayodhya on the king's invitation for a Shraddha ceremony, or simply dinner, the rakshasa cooks human flesh and offers that to the sage on behalf of the king. The enraged sage curses him to be transformed into a human-eating rakshasa and wander the forests. The pious king is outraged by the unjust curse and quarrels with the sage. Vashishtha reduces the curse to 12 years when he hears of the rakshasa's deception. But the king is not satisfied. He takes water in his hand to cast a curse on Vashishtha, but the queen dissuades him. However, the curse-ridden water was not to be wasted; If thrown on the ground, it would destroy the crop. If thrown in the air, it would spoil the rains. Throwing in any direction would harm some living beings. Ultimately, the king throws the water on his own feet. Since the king's feet become black and white in colour, he gains the epithets Kalmashapada and Kalmasanghri (literally, "pied feet").

=== Life as a rakshasa ===
The Mahabharata narrates that Kalmashapada cultivates an intense hatred for Vashishtha and his sons. He eats Shakti and his 99 brothers to seek his vengeance. The grief-stricken Vashishtha leaves his ashram and starts roaming the forest. He even tries to kill himself, but fails every time. Texts such as the Mahabharata, the Linga Purana, and the Kanchipuranam blame Vishvamitra for provoking Kalmashapada to slay Vashishtha's sons. An older scripture, Brihaddevata, also mentions that multiple Saudasas (sons of Sudasa) slay the hundred sons of Vashishtha.

Various texts relate that in the forest, Kalmashapada encounters a young Brahmin couple engaged in coitus. Kalmashapada disturbs the act before climax and captures the Brahmin youth. His wife pleads that her husband has not impregnated her yet, and that it was improper to kill a Brahmin. However, Kalmashapada devours the youth. The chaste Brahmin widow wails and curses Kalmashapada that he would die if he touched any woman with amorous intent. The wife cremates her husband and performs sati by jumping into his funeral pyre.

The Shiva Purana adds a continuation: The sin of killing a Brahmin transforms into a monster called Brahmahatya, who starts following Kalmashapada. The latter tries to escape the monster, and finally reaches King Janaka's court. There, the sage Gautama teaches Kalmashapada divine knowledge and directs him to the Shiva temple of Gokarna to free him of his sins. At Gokarna, Kalmashapada performs intense austerities and is liberated from Brahmahatya.

The Mahabharata also records an encounter between the sage Uttanka and Kalmashapada. After serving his guru Gautama for a hundred years, Uttanka is allowed to go, but must provide Gautama with gurudakshina, a traditional repayment for his teacher's services. Gautama's wife Ahalya suggests that he bring her the divine earrings of Madayanti, Kalmashapada's wife, as repayment. Uttanka meets the cannibalistic Kalmashapada, who approaches Uttanka to eat him, but Uttanka stops him and explains that he is duty-bound to get Madayanti's earrings as a gurudakshina and that he, Uttanka, would return to Kalmashapada after fulfilling his obligation. Kalmashapada agrees and directs him to his wife, who refuses to part with her earrings until Uttanka brings some token from Kalmashapada as proof of his consent. Upon returning from Kalmashapada with a token, Madayanti gives him the earrings.

=== Liberation from the curse and children ===
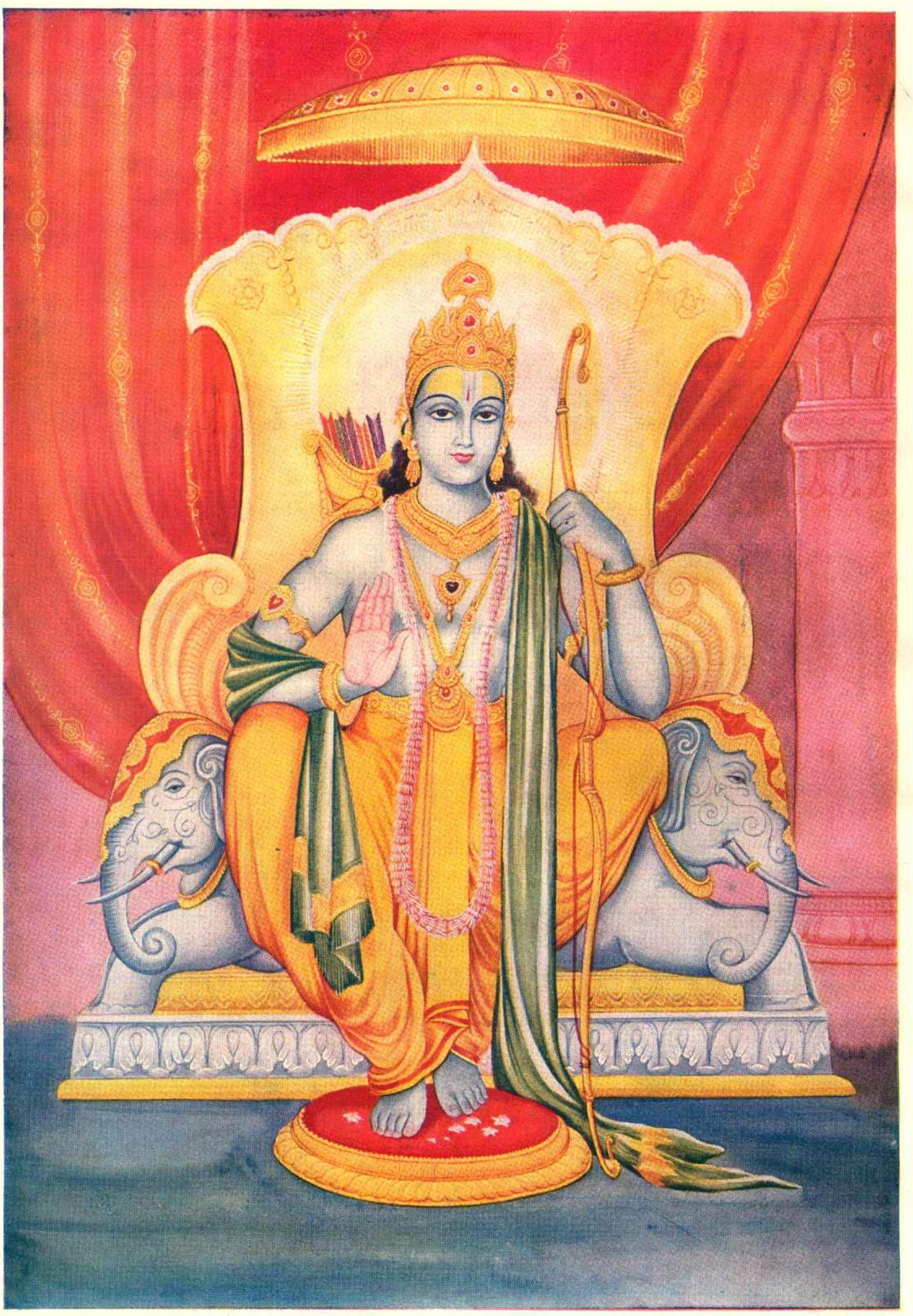
Rama is a descendant of Kalmashapada.

The Mahabharata narrates that Vashishtha meets Kalmashapada at the end of the 12-year period and frees the king of the curse. The king returns to his original form and accepts the sage as his guru and purohita (priest). Both of them return to Ayodhya. However, Kalmashapada is still heirless and cannot unite with his wife in coitus due to the Brahmin widow's curse. The king requests Vashishtha to inseminate Madayanti, following the practice of niyoga. The queen becomes pregnant by the sage, but does not deliver for 12 years. Finally, the frustrated queen breaks her womb with a stone and her son is born. Since the son is born with the aid of a stone (ashman), he is named Ashmaka ("the child born of a stone"). The Mahabharata adds that this act of "giving" his wife to a Brahmin helps Kalmashapada attain heaven.

A central character of the epic, King Pandu, who is cursed to die upon having sex with his wife, convinces his wife Kunti to have niyoga with the gods and mother children for him, citing the example of Kalmashapada. The scholar Meyer suggests that the tale of Pandu may be inspired by the much older narrative of Kalmashapada.

Other texts agree that Vashishtha ends Kalmashapada's curse; however, there is some variation. In the Bhagavata Purana, Vashishtha himself strikes the queen's belly with a stone after seven years to free the child. The Vishnu Purana credits the queen for opening her own womb, but the period is seven years.

All texts agree that Kalmashapada is an ancestor of Dasharatha and his divine son Rama, the hero of the Ramayana. The names of Kalmashapada's children and the number of generations between Kalmashapada and Dasharatha varies. The Vishnu Purana, the Vayu Purana, the Bhagavata Purana, the Kurma Purana, and the Linga Purana contain a few variations of the names. According to them, Ashmaka was the son of Kalmashapada, and nine generations lie between Kalmashapada and Dasharatha. The Matsya Purana, the Agni Purana, the Brahma Purana, and the Harivamsa call Kalmashapada's son Sarvakarma (who is said to be the grandfather of Kalmashapada in the Vishnu Purana, et al.), but agree as to the number of generations with the Vishnu Purana, et al. The Ramayana identifies the son as Shankhana and states that ten generations lie between Kalmashapada and Dasharatha.

== In Buddhism ==
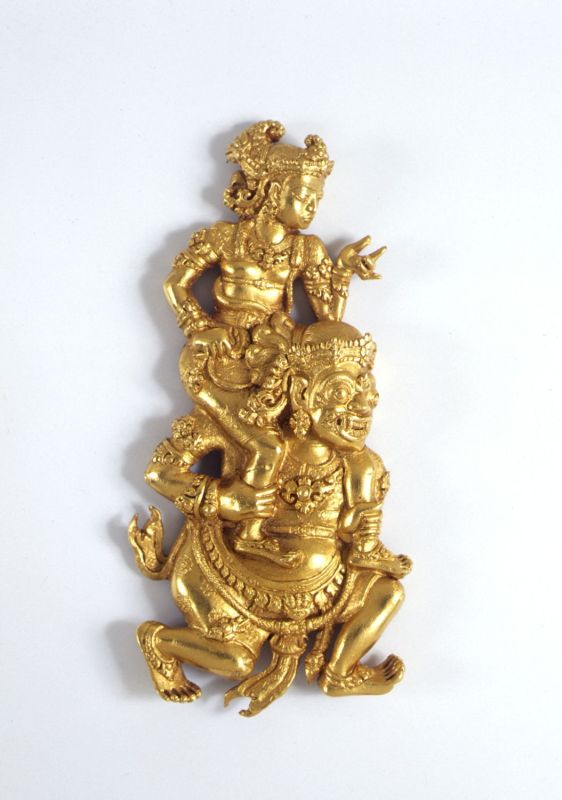
A figure of gold from the Majapahit period representing Sutasoma being borne by Kalmashapada

In Buddhist literature, Kalmāṣapāda (Pali: Kammāsapāda) is better known as Porisāda ("cannibal") or Saudāsa.

In the Theravāda Jātaka collection, he is the antagonist of the Mahāsutasoma Jātaka (Jātaka No. 537)—where he is identified as a previous birth of Aṅgulimāla—and also appears in the Jayaddisa Jātaka (Jātaka No. 513). The king of Benares developed an uncontrollable craving for human flesh after his cook accidentally served him flesh from a funeral pyre, awakening a habit from a past birth as a raksha. Expelled from his kingdom, he becomes a forest cannibal (porisāda) and receives the epithet Kammāsapāda ("spotted-foot") after treading on an acacia stake while fleeing pursuers, leaving a scar resembling well-grained timber.

To fulfill a vow to a tree spirit by sacrificing 101 monarchs, Porisāda captures a hundred kings and finally seizes Prince Sutasoma (the Bodhisatta, ruler of the Kuru kingdom). This motif mirrors king Jarāsandha, who imprisons eighty-six kings to sacrifice them to Śiva. Granted temporary leave to reward a Brahmin for reciting four sacred stanzas, Sutasoma voluntarily returns to face execution rather than break his promise; astounded by this integrity and moved by Sutasoma's teachings on morality, Porisāda renounces cannibalism, frees the captive kings, and regains his throne.

In Sanskrit and Mahayana Buddhist texts—such as Āryaśūra's Jātakamālā (tale 31), the Laṅkāvatāra Sūtra, and the Karuṇāpuṇḍarīka Sūtra—Saudāsa similarly serves as an exemplar of dietary transformation and compassion, with some versions attributing his feral nature to his birth from King Sudāsa and a lioness. The narrative also spread to Southeast Asia, notably inspiring the 14th-century Old Javanese Kakawin Sutasoma by Mpu Tantular.

== See also ==
- Asmaka Mahajanapada

== Sources ==
- Mani, Vettam (1975). Purāṇic encyclopaedia : a comprehensive dictionary with special reference to the epic and Purāṇic literature. Delhi: Motilal Banarsidass. ISBN 978-0-8426-0822-0.
- Meyer, Johann (1971). Sexual life in ancient India : a study in the comparative history of Indian culture. Delhi: Motilal Banarsidass Publishers Private Ltd. ISBN 978-81-208-0638-2.
- Mitchiner, John (2000). Traditions of the seven Risis. Delhi: Motilal Banarisdass. ISBN 978-81-208-1324-3.
- Wilson, H. H. (1866). The Vishńu Puráńa. Trübner & CompanyBooks.
- Watanabe, K (1909). The Story of Kalmāṣapāda and Its Evolution in Indian Literature. (A Study in the Mahābhārata and the Jātaka) (PDF). p. 253.
