= Amshuman =

King in Hindu literature

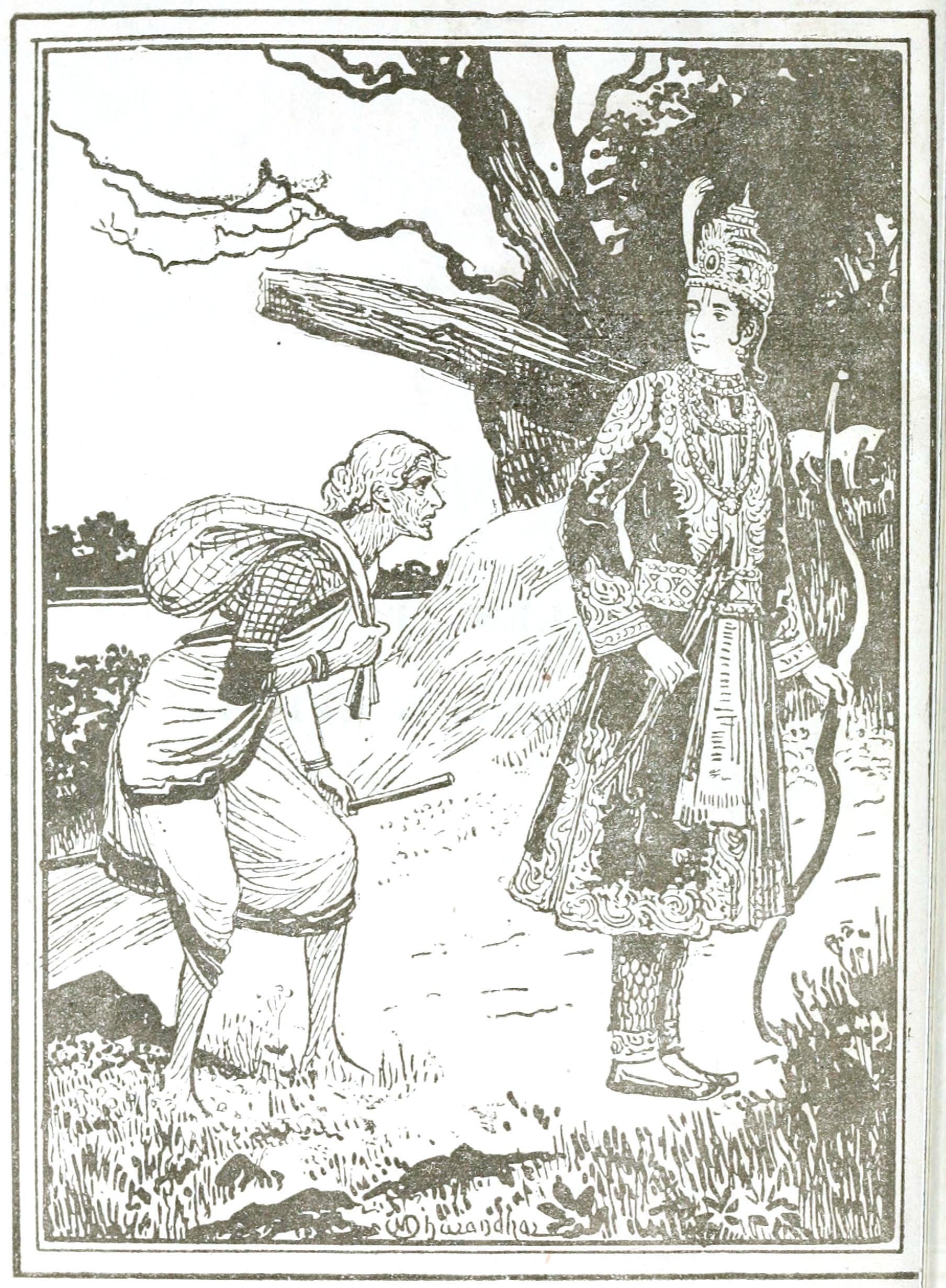
- Amshuman talks to an elderly woman
- Texts: Ramayana, Puranas
- Region: Ayodhya

Genealogy
- Parents: Asamanjasa (father), Ambujakshi (mother)
- Children: Dilipa
- Dynasty: Suryavamsha

Anshuman (Sanskrit: अंशुमान्, romanized: Aṃśumān) is a king of the Suryavamsha dynasty in Hinduism. The son of Asamanjasa, Amshuman becomes the king of Ayodhya after the death of his grandfather, King Sagara. Anshuman’s grandson, Bhagiratha, brings the flow of the Ganges down from heaven.

== Legend ==
=== Quest ===
When King Sagara performs the ashvamedha yajna, Indra steals the sacrificial horse. Sagara asks his 60,000 sons, including Amshuman's father, Asamanjasa, to go and fetch it. The sons venture to the netherworld, and find the horse tied beside the meditating Sage Kapila. The sons create a great din upon their discovery, disturbing the penance of the sage. As a consequence, Kapila burns them to ashes with his fiery eyes. When Sagara's sons do not return, he requests his grandson, Amshuman, to go and look for them.

=== Discovery ===
Amshuman follows the path that his father and uncles took to Patala. There, he sees Sage Kapila and the horse. He approaches him respectfully, and asks about the whereabouts of his family members. Upon being told that they were burnt to ashes, he becomes inconsolable, since his father and uncles would now be unable to attain heaven, due to the proper funeral rituals not having been performed. Kapila tells Amshuman that only his yet unborn grandson, Bhagiratha, could bring the Ganges down from Svarga. Amshuman reports these unfortunate tidings to Sagara, who becomes grieved.

King Sagara could not find a solution to bring the river Ganga to the earth, and ultimately dies after ruling his kingdom for 30 thousand years. As per primogeniture, the people and ministers then installed Amshuman as their king.

Amshuman would be succeeded by his son, Dilipa.
