= Kampilya =

Capital of Southern Panchala

Kampilya was the capital of the Panchala Kingdom, which was a mahajanapada mentioned in the Mahabharata. Kampilya was the capital of southern Panchala and Ahichchhatra was the capital of northern Panchala. Kampilya was ruled by Drupada during Mahabharata period. It is mentioned in Mahabharata that when the Pandavas were in exile and staying in Ekachakra (Etawah), (Uttar Pradesh) they learned that Drupada, King of Panchala, had announced the Swayamvara of his daughter Draupadi. Then they went to Kampilya (Kampil, Uttar Pradesh), the capital of Drupada.

== History ==
Previously called by the names Kampilya and Makandi, the history of Kampilaji dates back to the times of Bhagawan Vimalanatha. It is also the birthplace of king Harisen of the Ikshvaku dynasty. It was the capital of king Drupad who ruled this place during the period of Bhagawan Neminatha. Many remains found during the excavation work indicate that there were many Jain temples at this place. But now the place is being transformed into a village. This is also the birthplace of Sati Draupadi among the 16 sati. The deities at this place are said to belong to the Guptan period.
