= Anaranya =

King in Hindu literature

Anaranya (2)
- Texts: Ramayana

Genealogy
- Parents: Sambhuta (father)
- Children: Prishadashva
- Dynasty: Suryavamsha

Anaranya (2) (Sanskrit: अनारण्य, romanized: anaaraṇya) is a king of the Suryavamsha (Solar dynasty) featured in Hindu literature. His legend is described in the Hindu epic Ramayana. He was killed by Ravana. His son Prishadashva became the new king.

== Legend ==
Anaranya is a descendant of Ikshvaku, and a king of Ayodhya. According to the Ramayana, after the rakshasa king Ravana gained the Pashupatastra from Shiva, he declared war against humans, and decided to battle Anaranya. A fierce battle ensued between their forces. Due to the sorcery employed by the rakshasas, Anaranya, along with his army, were defeated. He was thrown away from his chariot after being struck down by Ravana's mace. Even as the rakshasa derided the king and his dynasty, Anaranya issued a curse that Ravana would meet his end by one of his descendants from the same dynasty. This curse comes true when Rama defeats Ravana.
