= Bersal =

The Barswal/ Barai/Bersal/ Barsyal (also called as Barisal, Barsyal, Bariwar, Barsala, Barsar or Badsar) is a Suryavanshi Rajput clan, and they were Rajas of Kashmir and Kangra. They are from the lineage of Maharaja Barsu/Barsal Dev Jamwal, a Dogra Rajput of Kashmir from the descendant of Maharaja Daya Karan Jamwal, Grandson of MahaRaja Jambulochan. They have migrated to other states in Northern India such as Gujarat and Rajasthan and are called by the names Barsal and Barswal as well. The Hindu branch provided the Maharajas of Jammu and Kashmir.

== Name variation ==
This goth of Rajput has different spelling variation in different regions. In Punjab state it is written as Barsal. In Jammu and Kashmir written as "Barsyal or Barai ". In Uttar Pradesh it is written as Barai. In Rajasthan it is written as Bersal and Barai . In Dehradun, Uttarakhand and in Kangra, Himachal Pradesh it is written as "Barswal".In some other parts of India written as "Barsar" and "Barsuwal"
