= Asmaka =

Ancient kingdom in India

Asmaka Aśmaka
- c. 700 BCE–425 or 345 BCE
- Asmaka and other Mahajanapadas in the Post Vedic period.
- Capital: Potali; Podana
- Common languages: Prakrit; Sanskrit
- Religion: Jainism; Buddhism
- Government: Monarchy
- Historical era: Iron Age
  - Established: c. 700 BCE
  - Disestablished: 425 or 345 BCE
| Succeeded by |
| Magadha |
- Today part of: Telangana, Maharashtra and Andhra Pradesh

Aśmaka or Assaka was a Mahajanapada in ancient India which existed between 700 BCE and 425 or 345 BCE according to the Buddhist texts and Puranas. It included areas in present day Telangana and Maharashtra in south-central India. In Gautama Buddha's time, many of the Assakas were located on the banks of the Godavari River (south of the Vindhya mountains).The capital of Aśmaka was the city variously named Podana, Potali, Paudanyapura, and Potana. Most scholars identify it with present-day Bodhan in Telangana.

In ancient India, during the 6th century BCE, there were sixteen Mahajanapadas. Among them, Ashmaka (or Assaka) was the only Mahajanapada located in South India.

== Location ==
Aśmaka was located on the Godāvarī river, between Mūlaka and Kaliṅga. The capital of Aśmaka was the city variously named Podana, Potali, Paudanyapura, and Potana, which corresponds to modern-day Bodhan in Telangana.

== History ==
Panini who lived in about the seventh century B.C. makes mention of Asmaka which was in the interior of the Deccan watered by the Godavari, which is identified with modern Nizamabad district.

Aśmaka annexed the small kingdom of Mūlaka located to its west during the Mahajanapada period, after which it became the southern neighbour of the kingdom of Avanti.

The Hathigumpha inscription of Kharavela (2nd century BCE) mentions Kharavela's threat to a city variously interpreted as "Masika" (Masikanagara), "Musika" (Musikanagara) or "Asika" (Asikanagara). N. K. Sahu identifies Asika as the capital of Asmaka. According to Ajay Mitra Shastri, "Asika-nagara" was located in the present-day village of Adam in Nagpur district (on the Wainganga River). A terracotta seal excavated in the village mentions the Asmaka janapada. Asmaka also included Mulaka area around Paithan known in ancient times as Pratishthana. According to Sutta Nipata Saketa or Ayodhya was first halting place on the southward road (Dakshinapatha) from Shravasti to Pratishthana.

Anguttara Nikaya like the Puranas tells that Assaka was one of the sixteen Mahajanapadas of Jambudvīpa. It had abundance of food and gems. It was wealthy and prosperous. One of the oldest works of the Pali-Buddhist literature, the Sutta-Nipata (verses 976-7) speak of a Brahman guru called Bavarl, as having left the Kosala country and settled near a village on the Godavari in the Assaka territory in the Dakshinapatha.

== Puranas ==
- Brihannaradiya Purana narrates entire story of the origin of Asmakas. King Saudasa, also known as Kalmashapada. After killing a tiger, a vengeful monster assumes the form of his priest, Vasistha, and tricks him into offering human flesh as a sacrifice. Vasistha curses Saudasa to become a monster for twelve years. Despite his efforts to avoid his fate, Sudas eventually succumbs to the curse. Every night, he took the form of a monster and used to kill human beings. One night in spite of the requests of a Brahmani, he ate up her husband. As a result, he is further cursed to die during union with his wife. After twelve years, Saudasa is freed from Vasistha's curse but remains haunted by the Brahmani's curse. With Vasistha's help, his queen, MadayantI, conceives a son named Asmaka. Asmaka's grandson, Narikavaca, is saved by naked women and is named accordingly. Dilīpa the forefather of the Lord Rama, is a descendant of Narikavaca, establishing a connection between the Ikshvakus and the Asmakas.
- Bhavishya Purana also mentions Asmaka as the son of Saudasa.

== Jataka tales ==
- Jataka tales, narrates a story of King Assaka of Potali, who is deeply grieved by the loss of his beautiful queen. The Bodhisattva, witnessing the king's sorrow, decides to intervene. A young Brahmin informs the king about the Bodhisattva's ability to communicate with the dead. The Bodhisattva reveals to the king that his queen has been reincarnated as a tiny dung-worm. Despite the king's pleas and declarations of love, the dung-worm, speaking in a human voice, reveals that she now prefers the life of a worm over her former existence. The king is astonished by this revelation and learns a valuable lesson from the Bodhisattva.
- Another story of the Assaka country and its connection with Kalinga is narrated in the Jataka tales. King Assaka of Potali, in the Assaka country, faced a challenge when King Kalinga of Dantapura sent his four beautiful daughters on a royal tour. Kalinga declared that any king who desired his daughters would have to fight him. Despite the initial resistance, Assaka's minister, Mandisena, welcomed the princesses and persuaded Assaka to marry them. Upon hearing this, Kalinga invaded Assaka, but was ultimately defeated through Nandisena's diplomacy. Kalinga was forced to send a portion of his daughters' dowry to Assaka. From then on, the two kings maintained a peaceful relationship.This story shows that the Assakas and the Kalingas were neighbours and that their countries bordered on each other. Evidently, it is the southern Assaka country on the Godavari.

== See also ==
- Asmaka kingdom
- Kingdoms of Ancient India
- Mahajanapada
- Janapada
- History of India
