= Bahuka =

Bahuka may refer to:

- Bahu (Bahuka), a king of the Solar dynasty founded by the legendary Indian king Ikshvaku
- Bahuka (Nala), a character from the Mahābhārata who temporarily bore the name "Bahuka"
- "Bahuk", a Gujarati narrative poem by Chinu Modi that is named after its central character, Bahuka (Nala)
