= Vimalanatha =

13th Tirthankara in Jainism

- 13th Jain Tirthankara
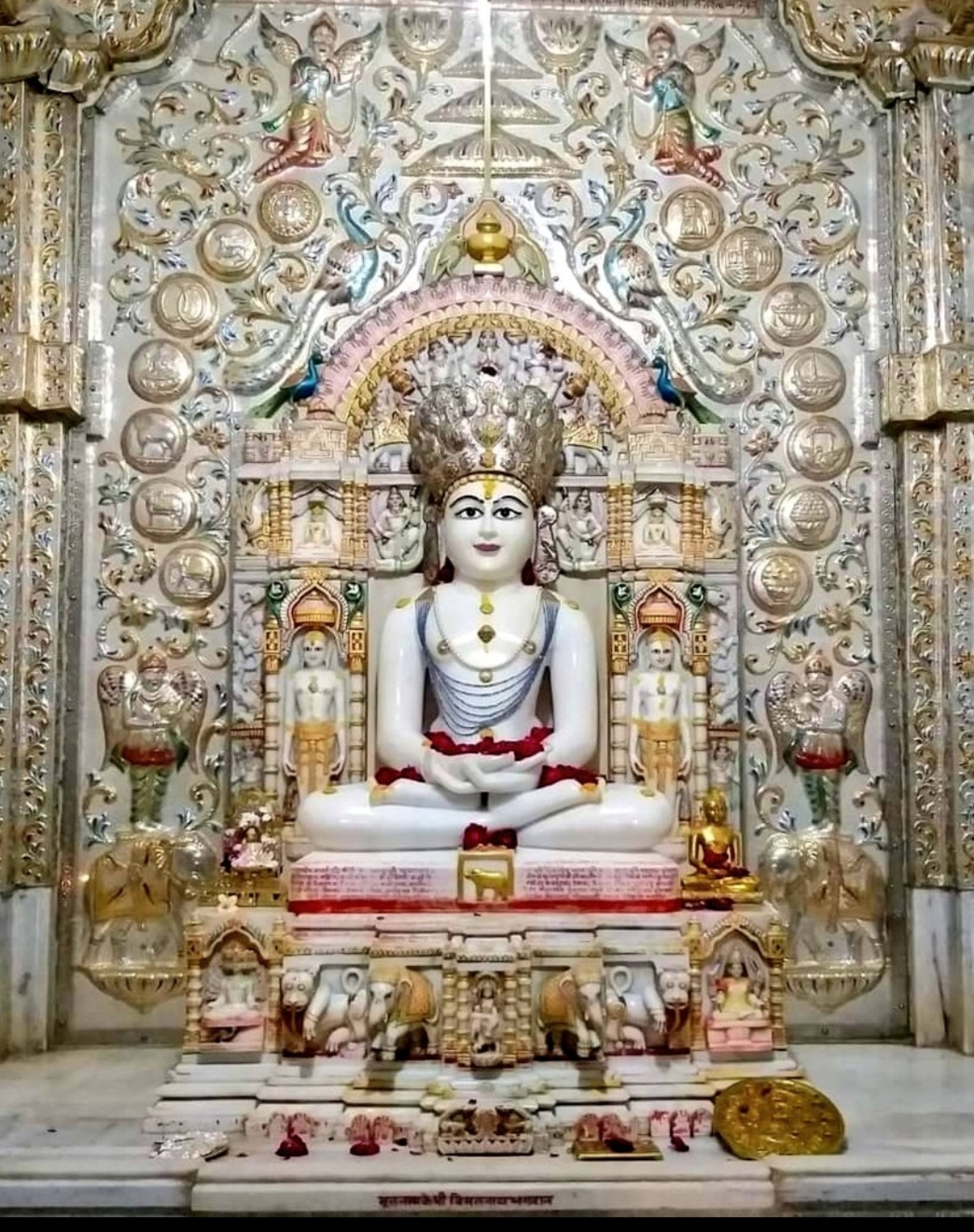
- Tirthankara Vimalanatha at Kampilji Shwetambar Jain Temple, Uttar Pradesh
- Venerated in: Jainism
- Predecessor: Vasupujya
- Successor: Anantanatha
- Symbol: Boar
- Height: 60 bows (180 meters)
- Age: 6,000,000 years
- Color: Golden

Genealogy
- Born: Kampilya
- Died: Shikharji
- Parents: Kritvarma (father); Shyama (Suramya) (mother)
- Dynasty: Ikṣvākuvaṁśa

Vimalanatha was the thirteenth Jain Tirthankara of the present age (Avasarpini). According to Jain beliefs, he became a Siddha, a liberated soul which has destroyed all of its karma. Vimalanatha was born to King Kratavarma and Queen Shyamadevi at Kampilya of the Ikshvaku dynasty. His birth date was the third day of the Magh Sukla month of the Indian calendar.

== Life and legends ==
According to Jain tradition, Vimalanatha is venerated as the 13th tirthankara of the present cosmic age (avasarpini). Jain universal history states that he was born into the ancient Ikshvaku dynasty to King Kratavarma and Queen Shyamadevi in the city of Kampilya. His birth is traditionally observed on the third day of the Magha Shukla month of the lunisolar Jain calendar. Within the expansive framework of Jain cosmology, texts attribute to him a symbolic lifespan of 6,000,000 years and a towering physical height of 60 bows (dhanushas). After a period of ruling his kingdom, traditional narratives describe him renouncing worldly attachments to become an ascetic, eventually attaining omniscience (Kevala Jnana). Following his period of preaching, he ultimately achieved liberation from the cycle of rebirth (moksha) on the sacred peaks of Mount Shikharji in modern-day Jharkhand.

Vimalantha is said to have been born 30 sagara after his predecessor, Vasupujya. His successor, Anantanatha, is said to have been born 9 sagara after him.

== Iconography ==
In Jain art and sculpture, Vimalanatha is traditionally depicted in a meditative posture with a golden complexion. He is distinctly identified by his unique iconographic emblem, the boar, which is typically carved or stamped onto the pedestal beneath his idols. As with all tirthankaras, he is depicted alongside his dedicated guardian deities (Shashan-devatas). According to the Digambara tradition, his accompanying male guardian deity (yaksha) is Shanmukha, while his female guardian (yakshi) is Anantamati. Conversely, the Śvētāmbara tradition identifies his guardian deities as Bhrikuti and Vidita, respectively.

== Temples and legacy ==
As the 13th tirthankara, Vimalanatha is heavily venerated, resulting in the establishment of several significant historical and modern temple complexes dedicated to his worship.

=== Places of birth and liberation ===
The ancient city of Kampilya in Uttar Pradesh, traditionally identified in Jain universal history as his royal birthplace, serves as a primary center for his pilgrimage and houses historically significant shrines dedicated to his early life. Furthermore, marking the geographic site of his ultimate spiritual liberation, a dedicated shrine (tonk) enshrining his footprints (charan) is actively venerated by pilgrims on the peaks of Mount Shikharji.

=== Other temples ===
In Maharashtra, the Shree Vimalnath Bhagwan Tirth in Dhule acts as a major regional spiritual center, alongside a prominent Śvētāmbara temple complex situated in Bibwewadi, Pune. Reflecting the global expansion of the modern Jain diaspora, a significant contemporary Jain Derasar dedicated to his worship has also been established in Dubai.

== Gallery ==
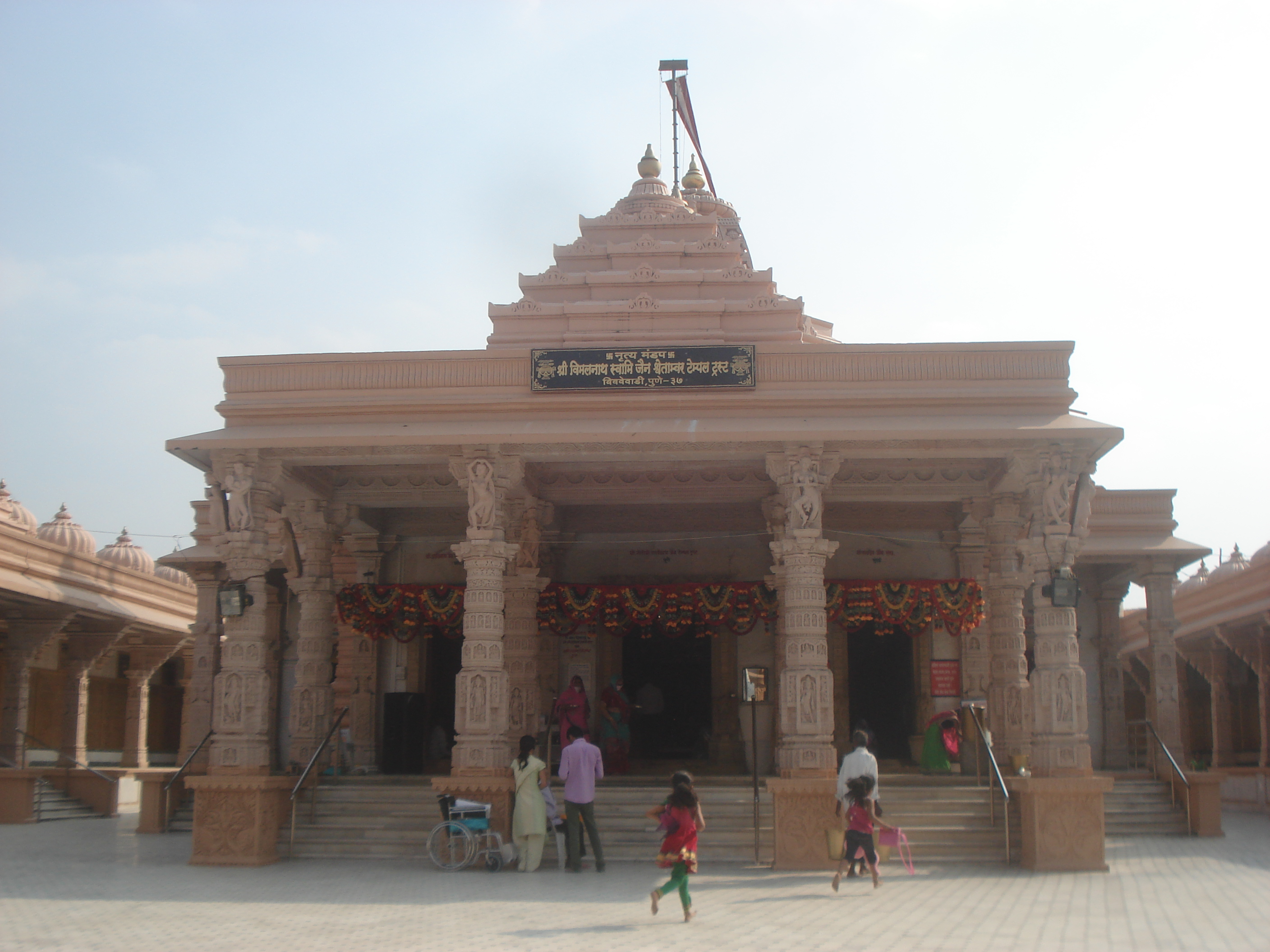
Shri vimalnatha swami Jain shwetambar temple, Bibwewadi

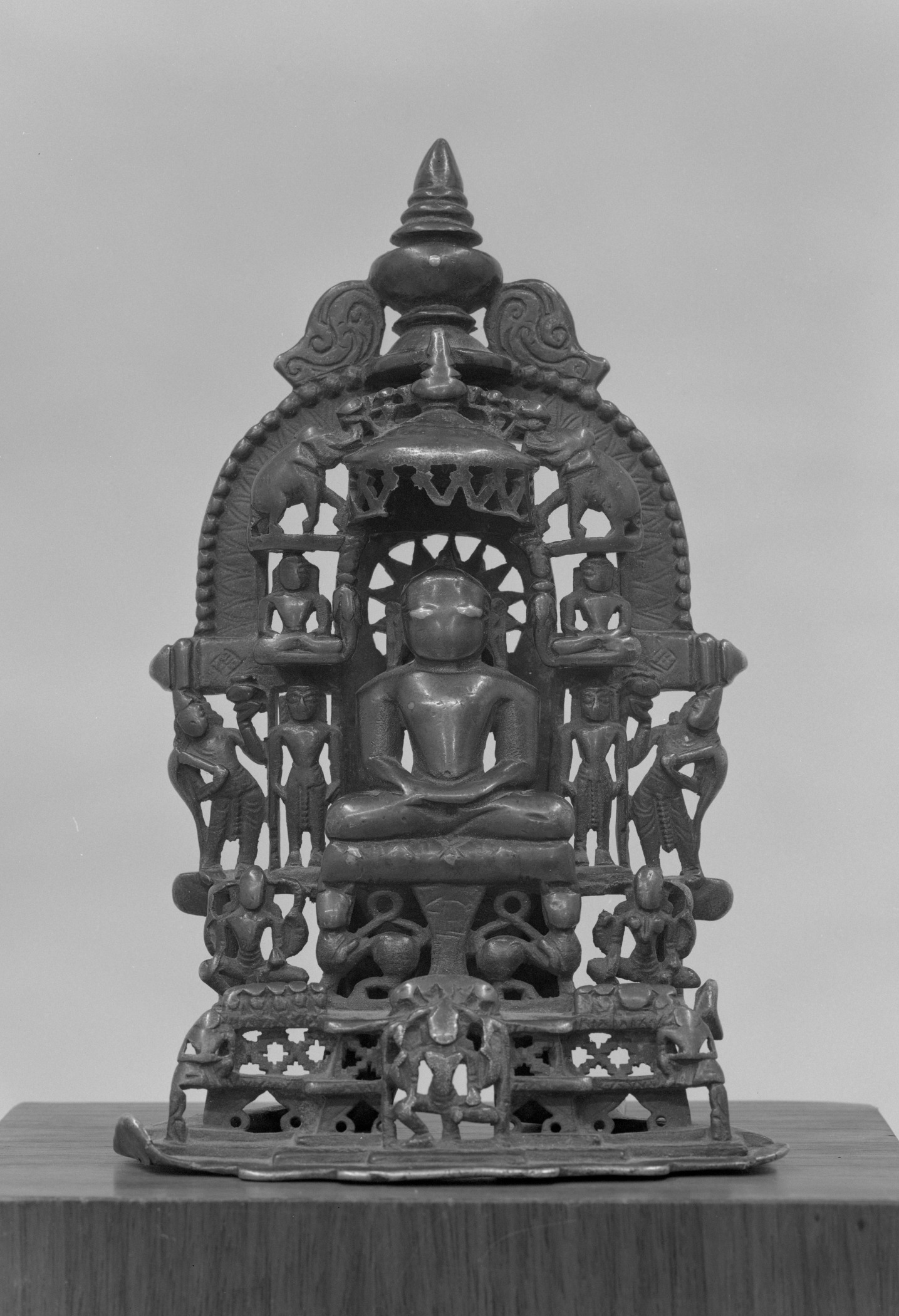
Jain Altarpiece with Vimalanatha in Los Angeles County Museum of Art, 15th century

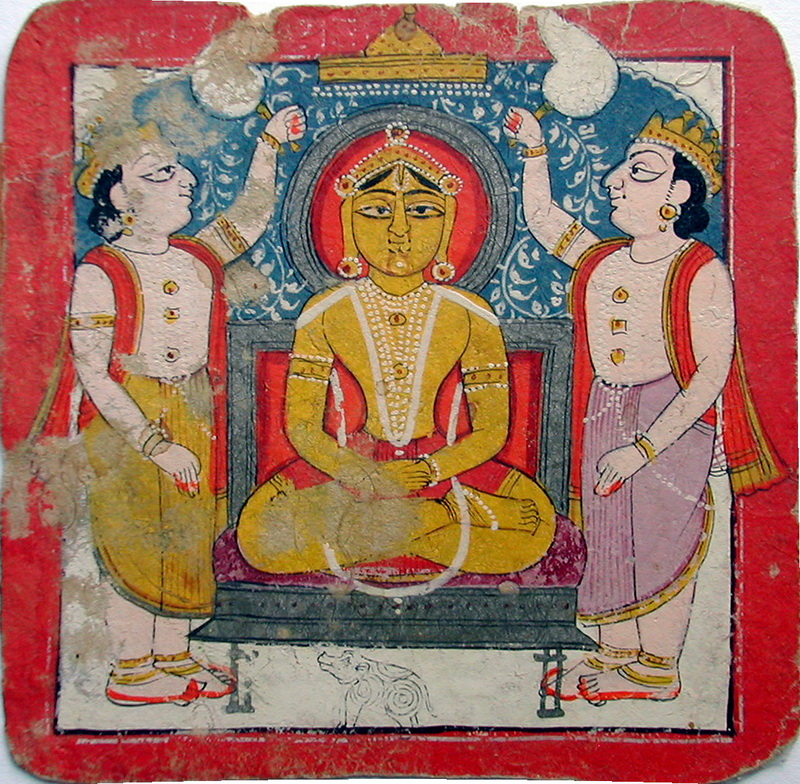
Miniature painting from Jodhpur ca. 1800 of 13th Tirthankara or Jina of Jainism

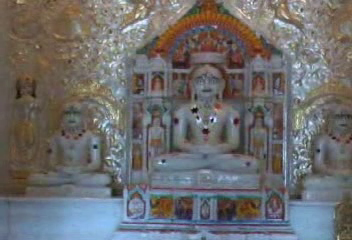
Bhagwan Vimalnathji idol of Bishangarh

== See also ==
- God in Jainism
- Arihant (Jainism)
- Jainism and non-creationism
