= Asamanja =

Prince in Hindu tradition

Asamanjasa
- Texts: Ramayana, Puranas
- Region: Ayodhya

Genealogy
- Parents: Sagara (father), Keshini (mother)
- Consort: Ambujakshi
- Children: Amshuman
- Dynasty: Suryavamsha

Asamanjasa (Sanskrit: असमञ्जस, romanized: Asamañjasa), also rendered Asamanja, is the eldest son of King Sagara and one of his two queens, Keshini, in Hindu literature.

== Legend ==
=== Ramayana ===
The birth of Asamanjasa is described in the Ramayana. King Sagara of the Suryavamsha dynasty married Keshini and Sumati, but still lacked heirs for several years. Thus, accompanied by his two queens, he set forth towards the mountain Bhṛguprasravaṇa in the Himalayas, and performed a long tapas. Pleased, the sage Bhrigu offered the king a boon: One of his queens would give birth to one son, but one who would further the dynasty's line, and his other queen would produce 60,000 sons. After a few years, Keshini gave birth to Asamanjasa, and Sumati gave birth to the 60,000 sons.

According the text, the prince was a wild and wicked young man. He used to throw young boys playing in Sarayu river into great depths, and see them drown. Thus, his father Sagara exiled him. But his son Amshuman, from his wife Ambujakshi, was a favourite of the people, and succeeded Sagara as the next king of Ayodhya.

=== Vishnu Purana ===
According to the Vishnu Purana, King Sagara performed the ashvamedha yajna to establish his suzerainty of the earth. Indra, the king of the devas, grew fearful over the results of the yajna, and so he decided to steal the sacrificial horse near a mountain. He left the horse at Patala near the sage Kapila, who was engaged in a deep meditation. King Sagara's 60,000 sons, and his son Asamanjasa, collectively known as the Sagarputras (Sons of Sagara) were commanded to find the horse. When the 60,000 sons circled the Ashtadiggajas and found the horse grazing near the sage, they made a great hubbub. When the furious sage opened his eyes to glare at them, they were immediately burned to ashes. Sagara would be succeeded by Asamanjasa's son, Amshuman.

=== Harivamsa ===
According to the Harivamsa, he was afterwards famous for his valour, under the name of Panchajana.
