= Jain temple, Dubai =

Temple in Dubai, UAE

Coordinates: 25.17005°N 55.42360°E

Vimalanatha Daresar
- Location within United Arab Emirates

Religion
- Affiliation: Jainism
- Deity: Vimalanatha

Location
- Location: Bur Dubai, Dubai, United Arab Emirates
- Interactive map of Vimalanatha Daresar

Architecture
- Temple: 1

The Jain Temple, Dubai (referred to locally as Derasar) is a house temple (ghar derasar) in Dubai, United Arab Emirates (UAE).

== About temple ==
The temple caters for the large Jain community in the United Arab Emirates and is the only Śvetāmbara Jain temple in Bur Dubai, where most of the Jains reside. The temple complex has Lord Vimalanatha, the thirteenth Jain Tirthankar as Moolnayak, Lord Parshwanath, the twenty third Tirthankar and Lord Sumatinath, the Fifth Tirthankar. Padmavati mata moorti is also there in this temple. There are more than 10,000 Jains in Dubai as of 2012.

== See also ==
- List of Jain temples
