= M. C. Joshi (archaeologist) =

Indian archaeologist (1935–2007)

Munish Chandra Joshi (30 March 1935 – 1 January 2007) was an Indian archaeologist who served as Director General of the Archaeological Survey of India (ASI) from 1990 to 1993. He was the head of the ASI when the Babri Masjid was demolished in 1992.

Joshi (1935–2007) devoted all his life to the study and research on art history, architecture, iconography, epigraphy, besides field archaeology. He left an indefatigable mark as an Indologist.

== Early life ==
Joshi was born at Haldwani in United Provinces on 30 March 1935. In 1956, he passed his M. A. in history from Lucknow University and joined the Archaeological Survey of India.
