= Trishanku =

King in Hindu literature

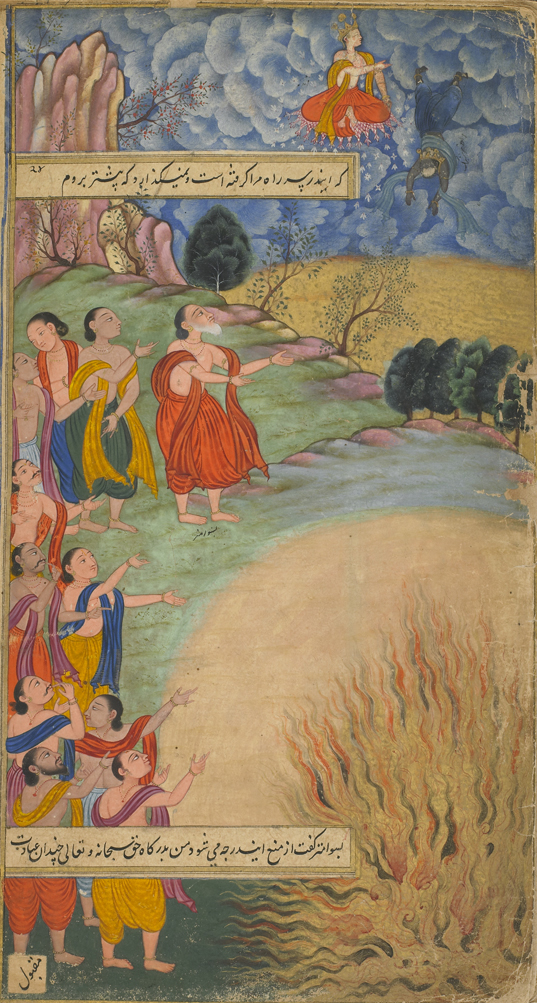
- Indra prevents Trisanku from ascending to heaven in physical form. Mughal Folio from the Ramayana of Valmiki.
- Texts: Ramayana

Genealogy
- Parents: Trayyāruṇa (father)
- Children: Harishchandra
- Dynasty: Suryavamsha

Trishanku (Sanskrit: त्रिशङ्कु, romanized: Triśaṅku), born Satyavrata, is a king of the Suryavamsha (Solar dynasty) featured in Hindu texts. His legend is described in the epic Ramayana. He is the son of Prithu.

== Etymology ==
The name Trishanku is a combination of Sanskrit words Tri meaning 'three' and śaṅku (शङ्कु) meaning 'stumps', thus the name means 'three stumps', likely denoting to the alignment of stars of the Southern Cross constellation.

== Legend ==
=== Puranas ===
==== Curse of Vasishtha ====
According to legend, Satyavrata was an impious and lustful prince. He is recorded as having been banished by his father, Trayyāruṇa, for stealing a Brahmin bride from her wedding ceremony. Holding the royal preceptor, Vasishtha, responsible for his prescription of the punishment, Satyavrata nursed a great hatred towards him. He is described as having greatly assisted the preceptor's traditional rival, Vishvamitra, when the latter's family suffered from hunger, offering them food daily during a severe drought. Once, when he was unable to find any game after a day of hunting, the hungry prince came across Nandini, Vasishta's beloved cow. He vengefully slew the cow, cooked it, and offered its meat to the unsuspecting family of Vishvamitra. When Vasishtha realised what had occurred, he cursed the prince to become a chandala and declared that he would henceforth be called Trishanku (three sins), referring to his actions of provoking the fury of his father, his abduction of another man’s bride, and his consumption of the flesh of a cow.

==== Ascent to heaven ====
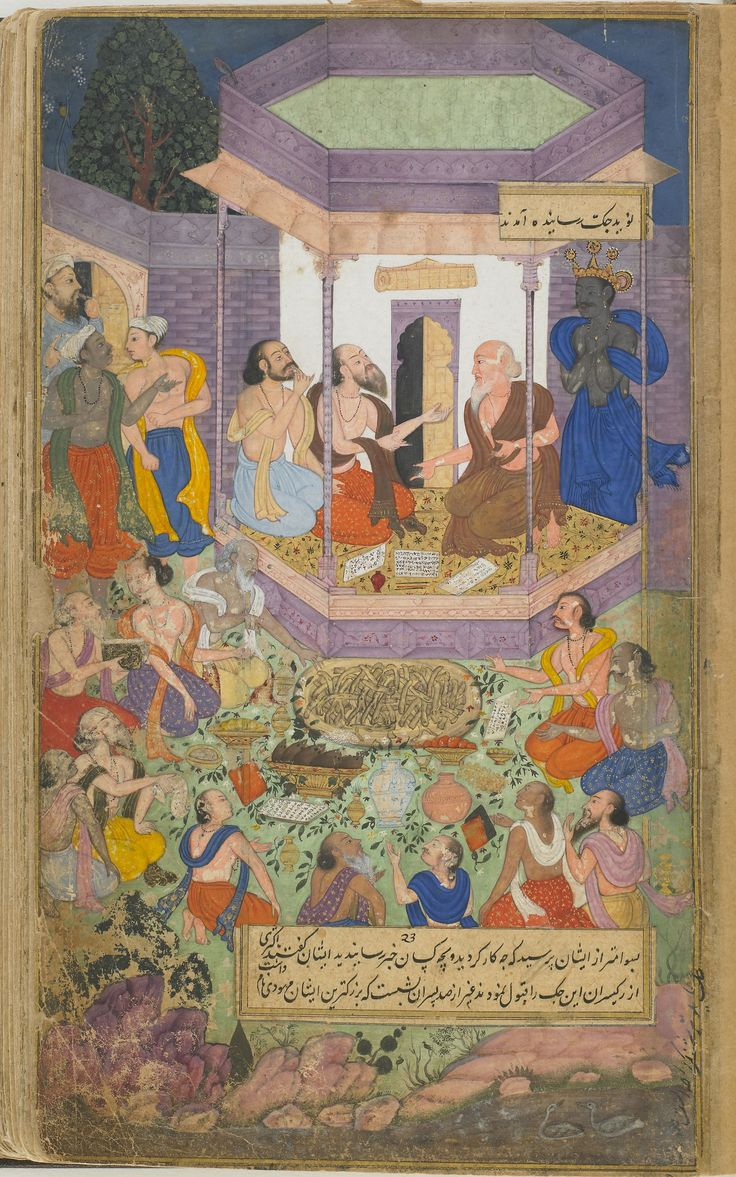
Ramayana By Akbar

The story of Trishanku's ascent to heaven is told in the Bala Kanda portion of the Valmiki Ramayana. The king had been promised a place in Svarga (the abode of the celestial deities) by the sage Vishvamitra. The sage engaged in a solitary yajna to achieve this, not joined by other sages due to instructions from Sage Vasishtha. Due to the power of the sage's ceremony, the king ascended to the gates of Svarga. The devas reported this to Indra, who angrily kicked Trishanku from the abode because of his bad karma, sending him hurtling towards the earth. Vishvamitra was able to halt his fall mid-way during his descent, and so the king was left suspended in the air. Indra opted to create a new Svarga below his own Svarga as a compromise, just for the residence of Trishanku. In retort, Vishvamitra created a new Indra and devas to occupy the new heaven with the king. Terrified of the powers of the sage, Indra relented, and personally carried Trishanku to the real Svarga on his own golden vimana.

=== Ramayana ===
According to the Ramayana, Trishanku is described to be a self-controlled, truthful, and righteous king in the Ikshvaku dynasty who wanted to ascend to Svarga in his own body.

He approached the chief priest of the Ikshvaku dynasty, Vasishtha, and later the priest's sons, to ask them if they would perform a sacrifice to help him secure such a place. Both Vasishtha and his sons refused Trishanku's request as impossible. When Trishanku told Vasishtha's sons of his intention to seek some other means to achieve his goal, they angrily cursed him so that he would physically transform into a chandala.

Abandoned by everyone because of this transformation, the king then seeks the help and refuge of Vishvamitra, who agrees to do the sacrifice for him out of pity. When he performed the sacrifice, however, none of the devas came to take their portions when summoned. Enraged by this, Vishvamitra raises the king to Svarga by his own ascetic power.

As soon the king reaches heaven, however, he is kicked out by Indra and the other devas because he was a chandala and thus deemed unworthy of ascending to Svarga in his body.

Eventually, an enraged Vishvamitra, threatening to undermine Indra's authority, secures the king a place among new stars, constellation, and even devas he creates through his own ascetic power, albeit with his head downwards.

=== Taittiriya Upanishad ===
The Siksha Valli of the Taittiriya Upanishad includes teachings attributed to Trishanku.

== See also ==
- Nahusha
- Yayati
- Indradyumna
