= Sagara (Hinduism) =

King in Hindu tradition

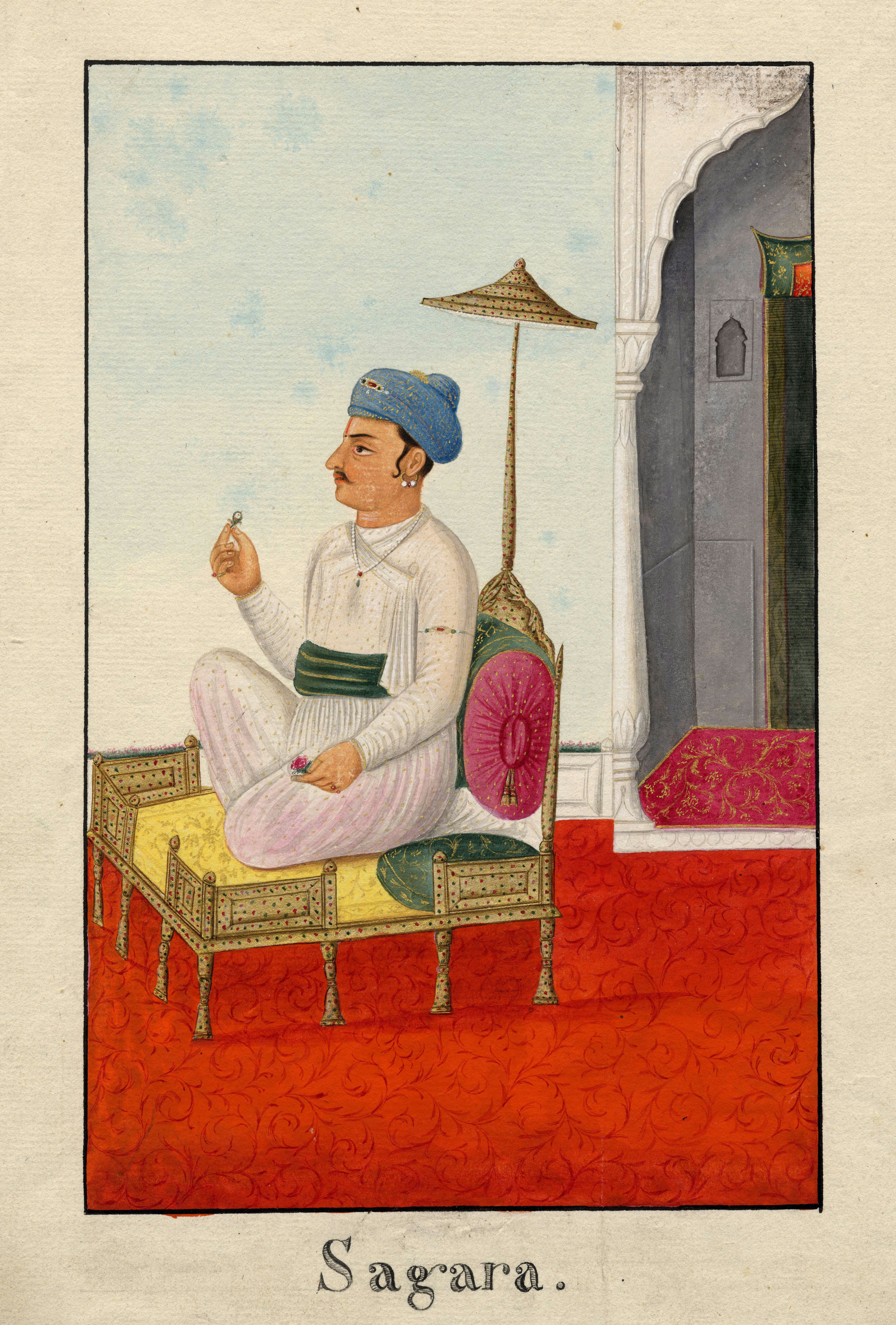
- Artistic depiction of Sagara
- Texts: Ramayana, Mahabharata, Puranas
- Region: Ayodhya

Genealogy
- Parents: Bahuka also known as Jitshatru (father); Yadavi also known as Vijayadevi (mother)
- Spouse: Keshini and Sumati
- Children: Asamanjasa (Keshini), 60,000 sons (Sumati)
- Dynasty: Suryavamsha

Sagara (Sanskrit: सगर, romanized: Sagara, lit. 'one who is born with poison') is a king of the Suryavamsha dynasty in Hinduism. The son of Bahuka, he ruled the city of Ayodhya, with two wives, and 60,001 sons.

== Legend ==
=== Birth ===
Saagar was born to Bāhuka, and his wife, Yadavi, at the ashrama of Sage Aurva, while seeking refuge in the hermitage from the attacks of Tālajaṅgha, the king of Hehaya. While Yadavi was in the seventh month of her pregnancy, her co-wife administered a poison to her, due to which she remained pregnant for seven years. When Bahuka died in the hermitage, Yadavi was ready to follow him in his funeral pyre, but was prevented by Aurva, who promised her that her child would grow up to become a great and fortunate emperor. Yadavi delivered shortly. As the poison (gara) given to her by her co-wife had immobilised her pregnancy, Aurva named her son Sagara (Sa-with, gara-poison).

=== Reign ===
Sage Aurva conducted the Upanayana ceremony of Sagara, and taught him the Vedas. Once, Yadavi wept to hear the boy address the sage 'father', and when he enquired her of her sorrow, she told him about his real father and heritage. Sagara sought to win back his birthright.

The people of Ayodhya, who lived in fear of Tālajaṅgha, sought the counsel of Vasishtha, who advised them to bring Sagara back to reconquer the kingdom. The masses waited outside the ashrama of Aurva for five days to bring their plea to Sagara. With the blessings of the sage, and accompanied by the people, Sagara fought Tālajaṅgha, reconquered his kingdom, and crowned himself as the king.

=== Children ===
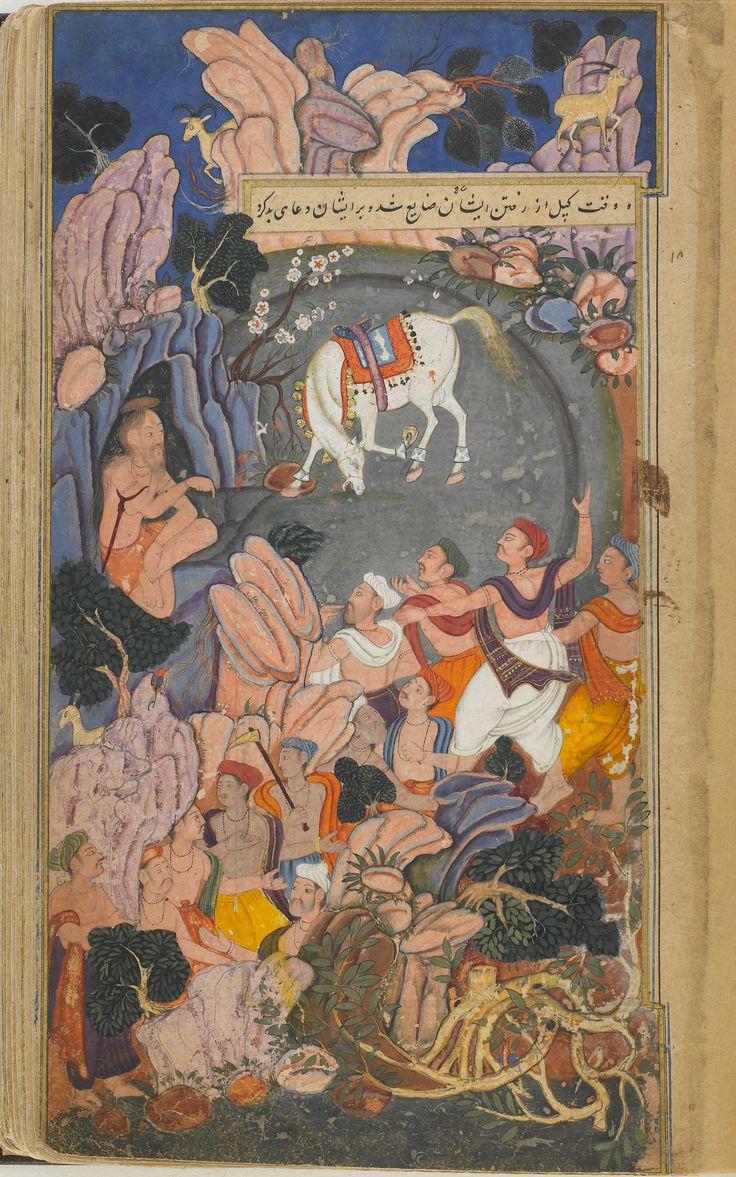
The sons of Sagara discover the stolen sacrificial horse grazing near Vasudeva, who had assumed the form of Kapila

Sagara had two wives called Sumati and Keshini.

As he had no issue for long, Sagara, with his two wives, went to the Himalayas, and started to perform tapas at the Bhṛguprasravaṇa mountain. After a century of thus, the sage Bhrigu appeared, and blessed Sagara that one of his wives would give birth to 60,000 sons, and the other to one, who would add to the glory of the dynasty. Sumati chose to bear the 60,000 sons, and Keshini decided to bear the one son. The sons of Sumati are described to be predicted to be unrighteous in character, while the son of Keshini would be righteous.

The king and his queens returned to Ayodhya, and in due course, Keshini delivered one son called Asamañjasa. Sumati gave birth to a lump of flesh, which developed into 60,000 children after being cut into thousands of effulgent pieces by Shiva.

Sagara embarked on a triumphal tour with his sons, and started a war of conquest. After conquering the northern regions of the land, he moved towards the south, his object being Māhiṣmatī, the kingdom of the Hehayas. He is stated to have destroyed the realm of his father's usurpers completely in battle.

=== Death of the Sagarputras ===
According to the Vishnu Purana, King Sagara performed the ashvamedha yajna to establish his suzerainty of the earth. Indra, the king of the devas, grew fearful over the results of the yajna, and so he decided to steal the sacrificial horse near a mountain. He left the horse at Patala near the sage Kapila, who was engaged in a deep meditation. King Sagara’s 60,000 sons, and his son Asamañjasa, collectively known as the Sagarputras (Sons of Sagara) were commanded to find the horse. When the 60,000 sons circled the Ashtadiggajas and found the horse grazing near the sage, they made a great hubbub. When the furious sage opened his eyes to glare at them, they were immediately burned to ashes.

Generations later, one of Sagara’s descendants, Bhagiratha, undertook the task of freeing the souls of his ancestors from Patala. He pursued this task by performing tapas to the goddess Ganga, and succeeded in causing her to descend from Svarga upon the earth as the river Ganges, and performing the funeral rites for the 60,000 perished sons at Patala.

=== Abdication ===
After the death of his sons, Sagara abdicated the throne of Ayodhya, anointing Amshuman, the son of Asamañjasa, as his successor. He retired to the ashrama of Aurva, and started to perform a penance to cause the Ganga to descend upon his son's ashes.

== Jainism ==
In Jain tradition, Sagara was younger brother of Lord Ajitanatha (second Tirthankara). He was born to Kshatriya King Jitashatru and Queen Vijayanti (Yasomati) of Ikshvaku dynasty in Ayodhya. He was the second Chakravartin ruler of Avasarpiṇī (present half of worldly time cycle as per Jain cosmology) who conquered the world with his seven jewels. His queens were Sumati and Bhadra. He had sixty-thousand sons from his queens, Janhu being the eldest. Janhu flooded the Naga Kingdom with waters of river Ganga. This infuriated the Naga King who burnt all the sons of Sagara in anger. Sagara then place Bhagiratha, his grandson, on throne and left for penance.

== See also ==
- Bhagiratha
- Yayati
- Kapila
