= Bahuka (Hinduism) =

King in Hinduism

- Texts: Puranas

Genealogy
- Spouse: Yadavi
- Children: Sagara
- Dynasty: Suryavamsha

Bahuka (Sanskrit: बाहुक, romanized: Bāhuka), also called Subahu, is a king of the Suryavamsha (solar dynasty) featured in Hindu literature.

== Legend ==
According to the Puranas, Bahuka was the son of Vrika. He was ousted from his throne and driven out of his country by the Haihayas and the Talajanghas. He took refuge in the hermitage of the sage Aurva. His son, Sagara, was born in this hermitage.
