= Bhagiratha =

King in Hindu tradition

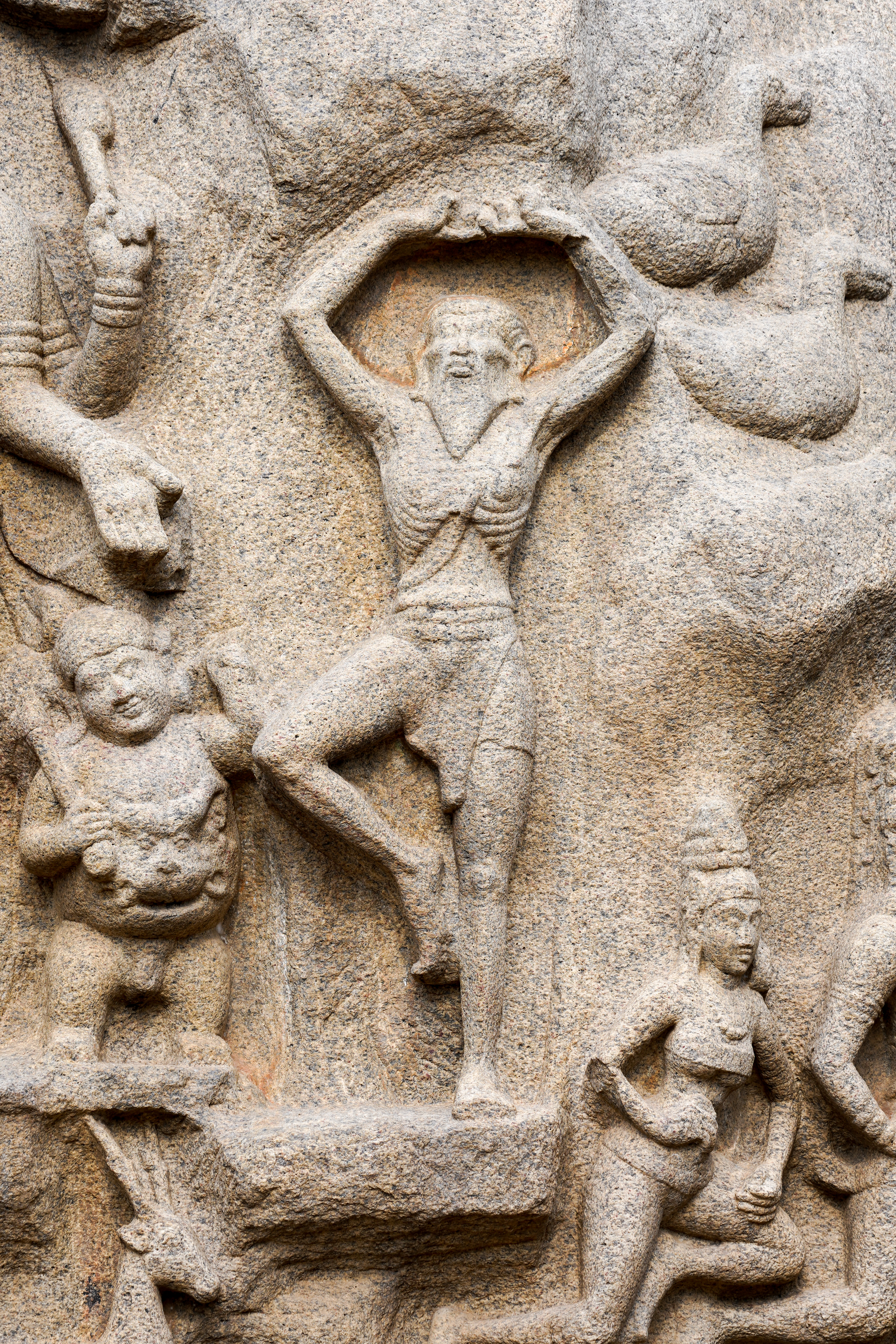
- Sculpture of Bhagiratha's penance, Descent of the Ganges, Mahabalipuram
- Texts: Ramayana, Mahabharata, Puranas
- Region: Ayodhya

Genealogy
- Parents: Dilipa (father)
- Children: Śruta (son), Haṃsī (daughter)
- Dynasty: Suryavamsha

Bhagiratha (Sanskrit: भगीरथ, IAST: Bhagīratha) is a legendary king of the Ikshvaku dynasty in Hindu literature. He is best known for his legend of bringing the sacred river Ganges, personified as the Hindu river goddess Ganga, from heaven upon the earth, by performing a penance.

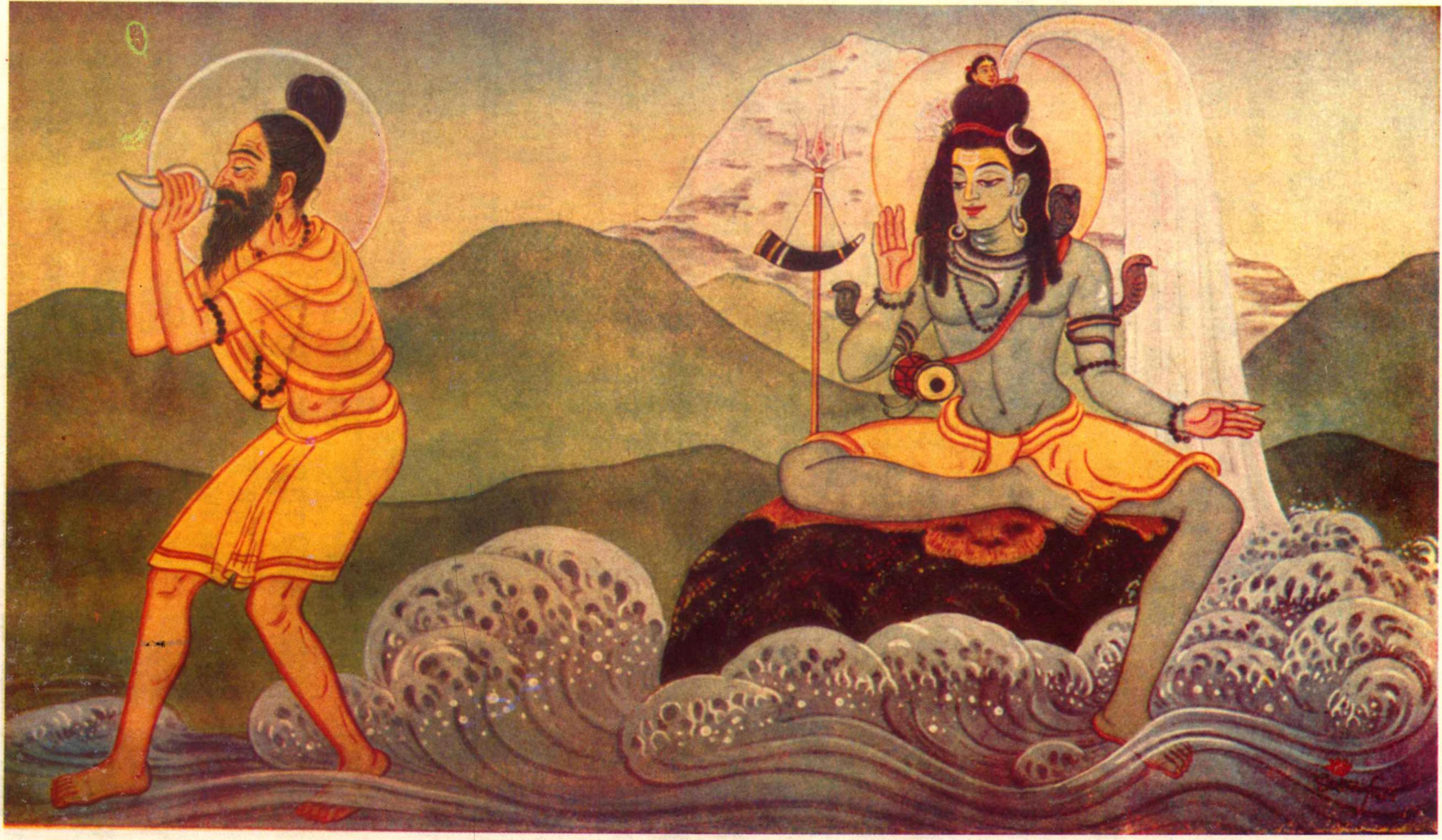
Representation of Bhagiratha as Ganga descends upon the earth

== Legend ==
=== Bhagirathaprayatnam ===
King Sagara, the great-grandfather of Bhagiratha, once performed the ashvamedha sacrifice, but the sacrificial horse was stolen by Indra. The deity had the animal sequestered in Patala, where Sage Kapila was performing a penance. The 60,000 sons of Sagara discovered the horse in Patala, whereupon they disturbed Kapila with their hoarse noises. Infuriated, the 60,000 sons of Sagara were reduced to ash by the fiery eyes of the sage. The responsibility of performing the funeral rites of these sons passed down from generation to generation, until it was acquired by Bhagiratha, who upon his ascension to the throne of Ayodhya, went to practice austerities in the Himalayas, to invoke the goddess Ganga. Ganga told Bhagiratha that were she to descend from Svarga to the earth, the force of her fall would be difficult to sustain. She asked him to obtain the favour of the matted-haired, blue-throated deity Shiva, as no one except him would be able to sustain her. Heeding her words, the king then performed a penance that lasted for a millennium for Shiva at Kailasa, and sought his cooperation in allowing Ganga to flow through his hair. Shiva granted him the boon, and stood in position, even as the torrent of Ganga's stream rushed upon his hair. Ganga flowed along the matted hair of Shiva for a thousand years. Bhagiratha performed another penance to please Shiva, until the deity shook his hair and allowed a single drop to descend upon the Indo-Gangetic plain, which became the Ganges. For Bhagiratha, the river flowed along the plain to Patala, and performed the funeral rites of Sagara’s sons. This episode is referred to as Bhagīrathaprayatnam, literally meaning, "Bhagiratha's labour".

To commemorate his efforts, the head stream of the river is called Bhagirathi by locals, till it meets the Alaknanda river at Devprayag. The mythical pātāla where the sage Kapila meditated is identified with the Sāgar Island, at the confluence of the Bhagirathi stream of the Ganges (flowing by Kolkata and revered as Ganga) and the Bay of Bengal. The sea (sam-udra) is called Sāgara in honour of Bhagiratha's ancestor the King Sagara. Kapila's ashrama is located at Sagar Island and hosts the annual Ganga Sagar Mela and bathing rituals on Makara Sankranti day every year.

While flowing towards Patala, the Ganga flooded the ashrama of Sage Jahnu. To punish the haughtiness of the goddess, the sage swallowed the river. It was with the insistent entreaties of Bhagiratha that the sage consented to push the river out through his ear, which offered the goddess the epithet Jahnavi.

=== Reign ===
After completing the funeral rites of his ancestors, Bhagiratha governs once more as king, and his people were wealthy and prosperous under his reign.

The Mahabharata states that the king had a great efficacy of gifting cows, offering hundreds of thousands of cows and their calves to the sage Kohala.

He marries his famous daughter, Haṃsī, to the sage Kautsa, before departing the earth.

== Literature ==
=== Narada Purana ===
In the Narada Purana, King Bhagiratha appeases Yama, and holds a discussion with him regarding the nature of righteousness. Yama offers the king various modes of being righteous, including offering employment and donating wealth to Brahmins, building Vishnu and Shiva temples, rituals that should be performed for the aforementioned two deities, donating food to the hungry, and the acquisition of punya. Yama goes on to describe the nature of sin, as well as the various hells that exist. The deity instructs the king to worship Vishnu, who is the equivalent of Shiva, and informs him of his future of freeing his ancestors from Naraka by causing the descent of the Ganga.

=== Bengali literature ===
In most accounts of Bhagiratha, he is born to his father Dilipa and his unnamed mother in an unremarkable fashion. However, a number of Bengali accounts tell how Dilipa dies without begetting an heir. This story may first be attested in the Bengali-script recension of the Sanskrit Padma Purana; it recurs in the influential, probably fifteenth-century CE Bengali Krittivasi Ramayan, and thereafter in other texts from Bengal such as Bhavananda's Harivansha, Mukundarama Chakravartin's Kavikankanachandi, and the sixteenth-century Ramayana by Adbhutacharya.

Dilipa's lack of an heir troubles the gods, because it has been prophesied that Vishnu will be born to Dilipa's line, and this prophecy cannot come true unless Dilipa has a child. Therefore, through the advice of a sage or god, two of Dilipa's widows have sex with one another and in this way one gets pregnant and gives birth to Bhagiratha. However, the baby is deformed (in the Padma Purana version, for example he is boneless, while in the Krittivasi Ramayan he is merely a lump of flesh) until he encounters the crippled sage Ashtavakra, who transforms him into a beautiful, strong child/youth. The Krittivasi Ramayan even goes on to describe Bhagiratha being bullied at school for having two mothers rather than heterosexual parents. Some of the texts too use the story to provide a folk-etymology for Bhagiratha's name, claiming that it comes from bhaga ('vulva').

== Gallery ==
A sculpture of Bhagiratha can be seen beneath the spout of almost every dhunge dhara (hiti) or tutedhara (jarun, jahru, jaladroni), two types of drinking fountain found in the old settlements of Nepal. Bhagiratha is pictured sitting, standing or dancing while holding or blowing a conch. A similar figure can be seen below the gargoyles in some temples in India.

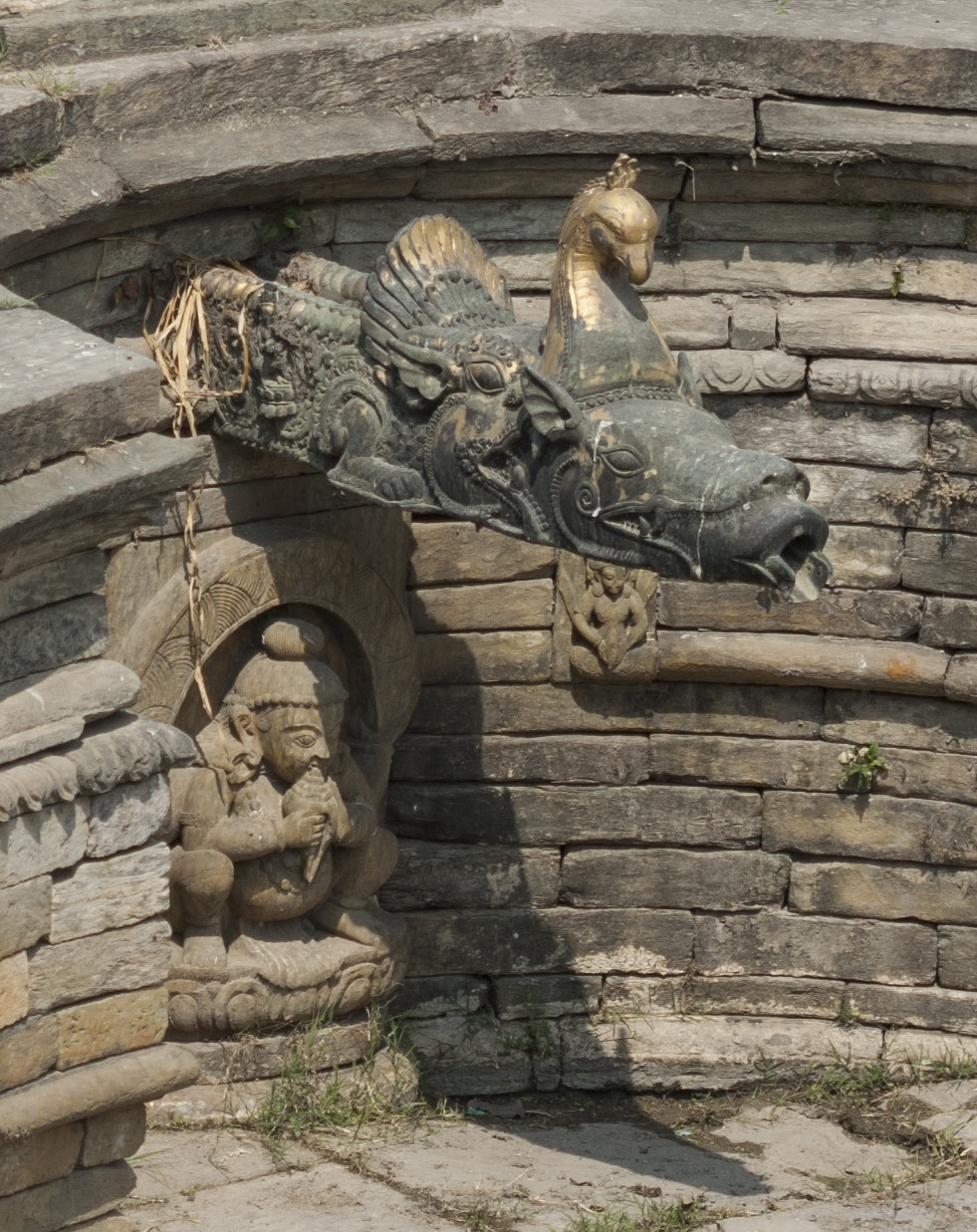
Bhagiratha beneath a spout of Sundhara, Kathmandu, Nepal

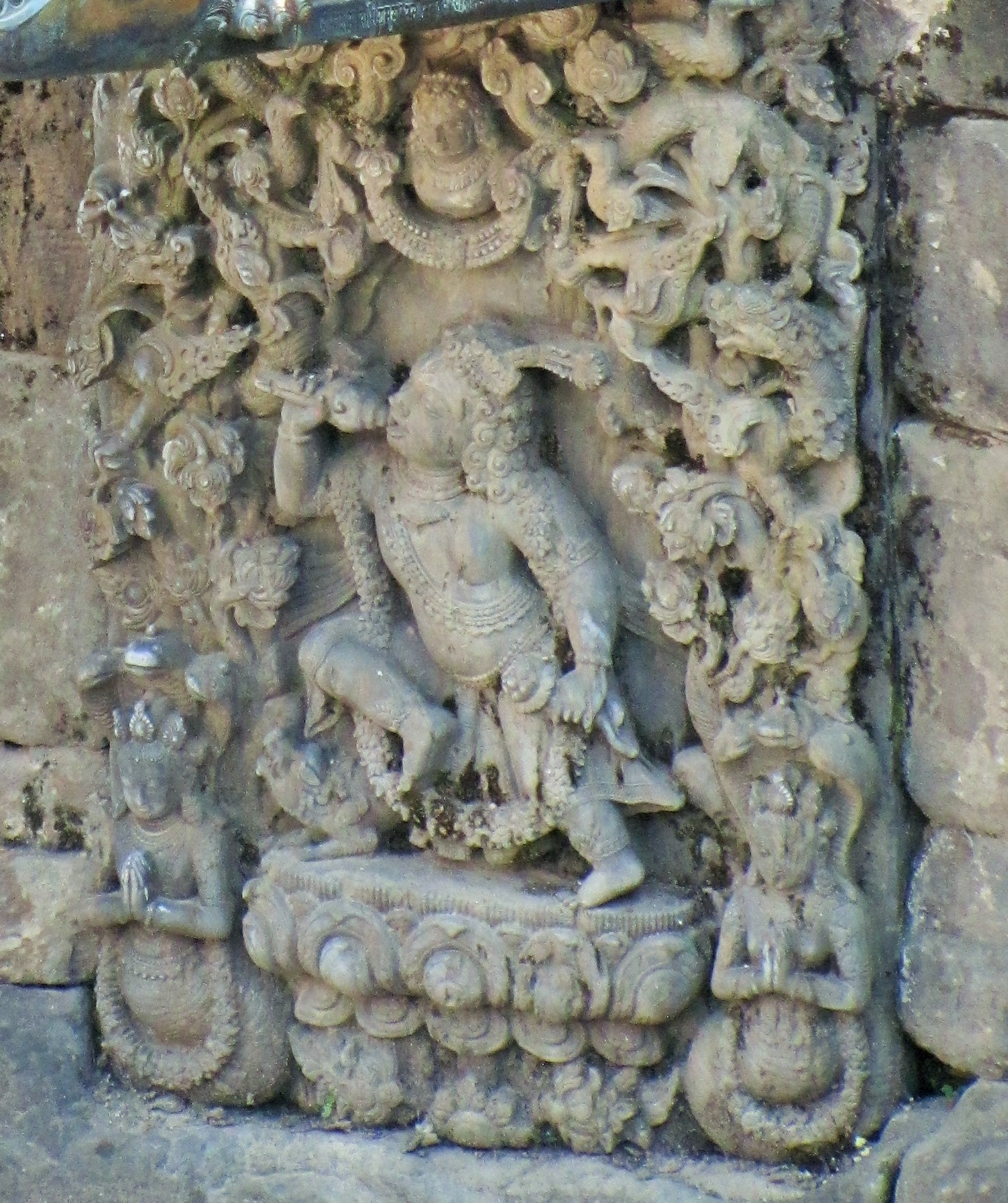
Bhagiratha in Thanthu Darbar Hiti, Bhaktapur, Nepal

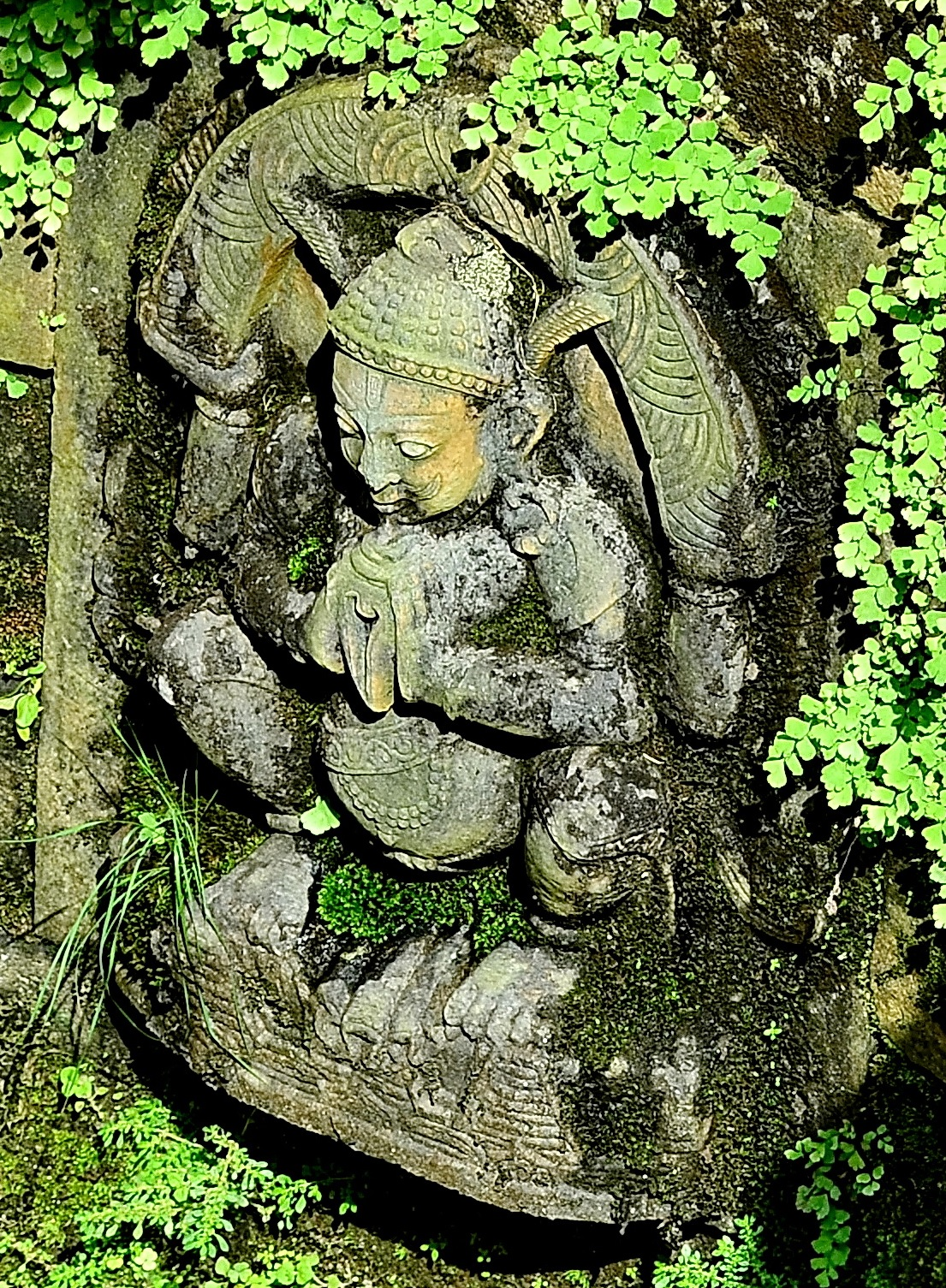
Bhagiratha at the spout of Gahiti, Changunarayan, Nepal

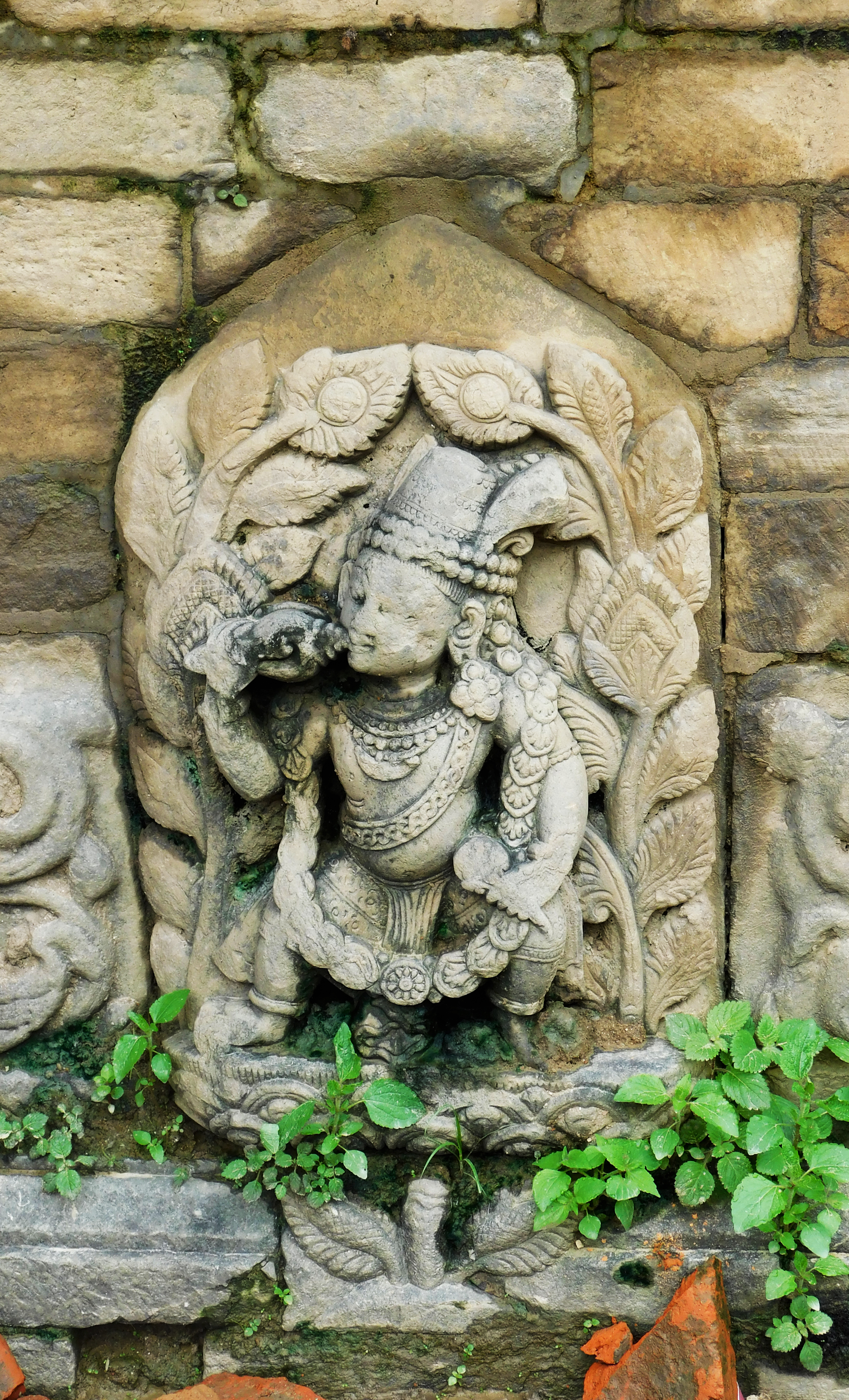
Bhagiratha on a jarun in Bhaktapur, Nepal

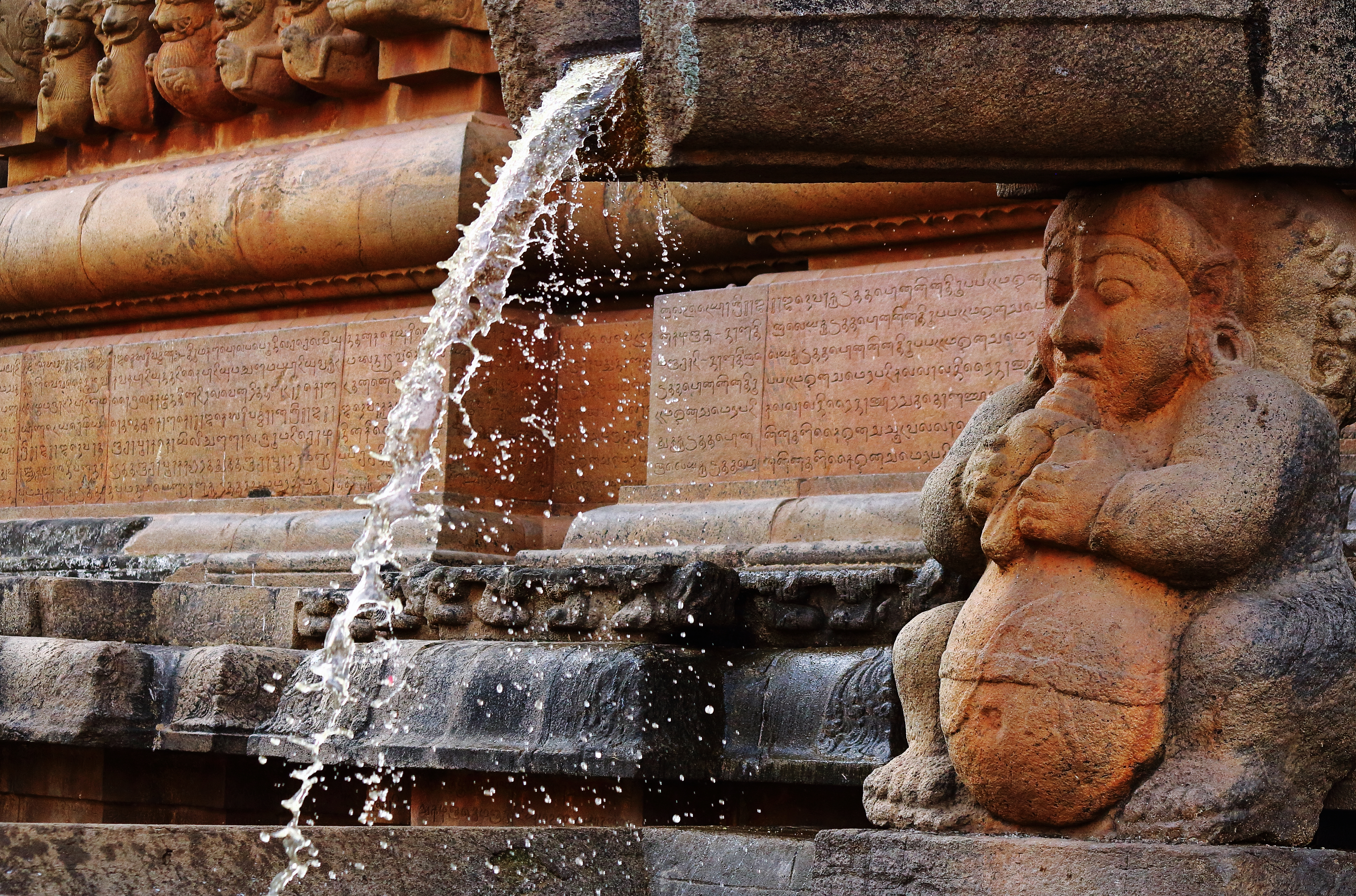
Bhagiratha beneath a gargoyle at the Brihadisvara Temple, Thanjavur, India

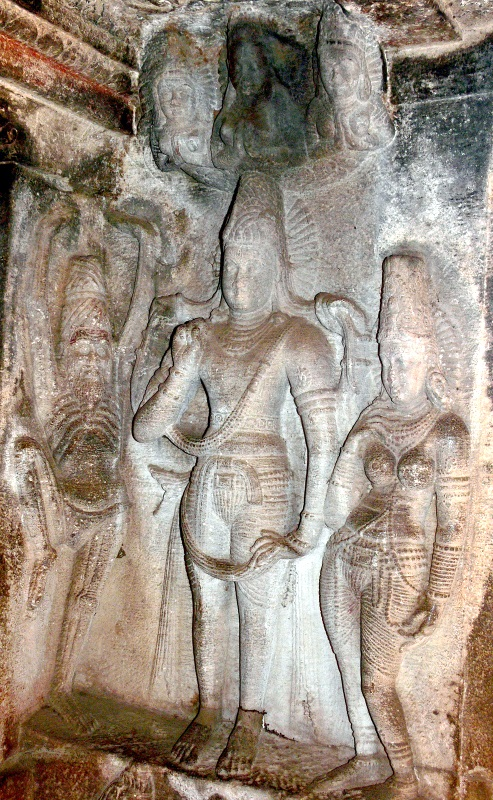
Bhagiratha (left) at the Ravana Phadi Cave, Aihole, India

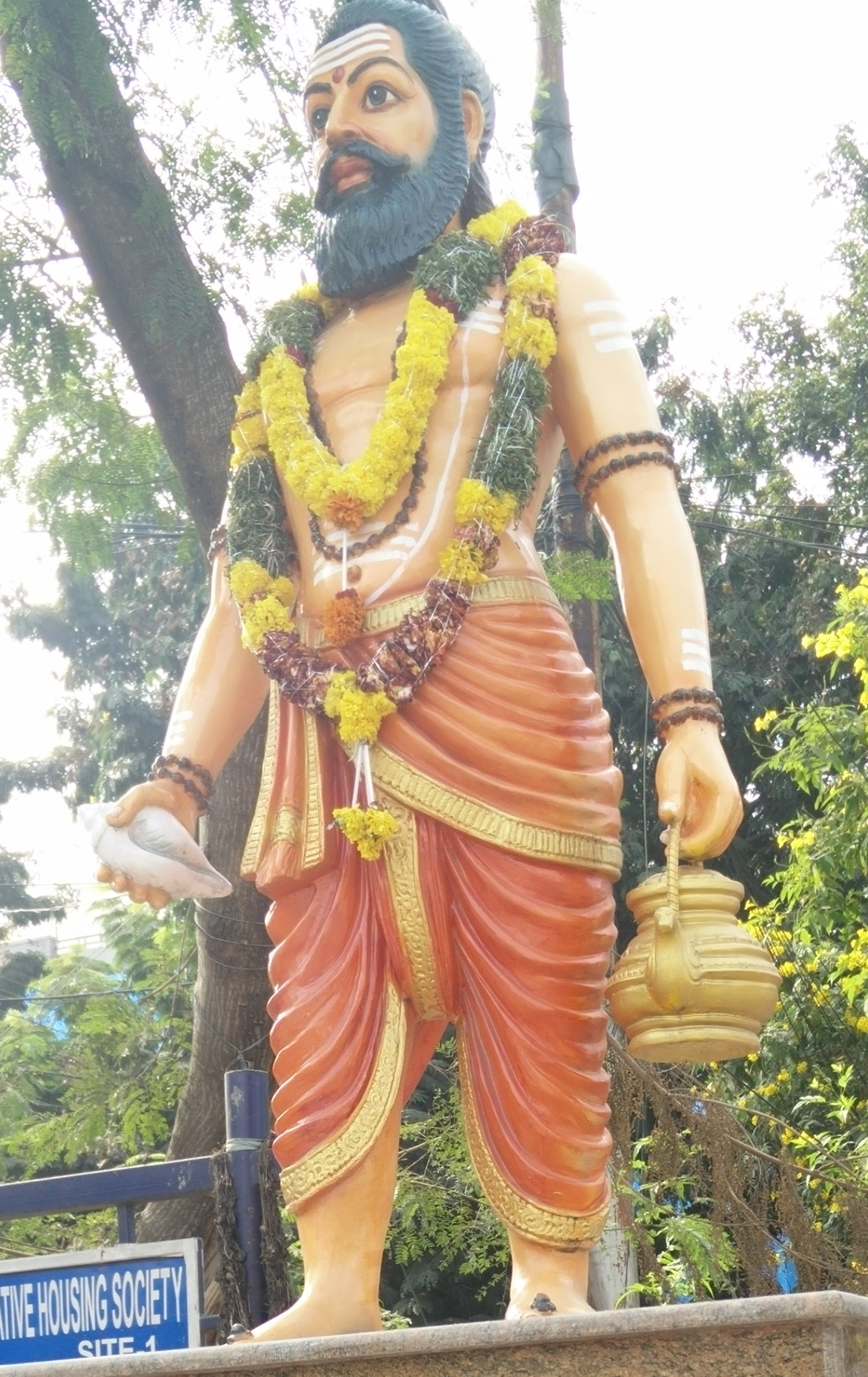
Bhageeratha statue in Hyderabad, India

== See also ==
- Kapila
- Ganga
- Sagara

== Sources ==
- The Ramayana (2001) by Ramesh Menon
- Dictionary of Hindu Lore and Legend (ISBN 0-500-51088-1) by Anna L. Dallapiccola
