= Ayodhya (Ramayana) =

Legendary city in Sanskrit texts

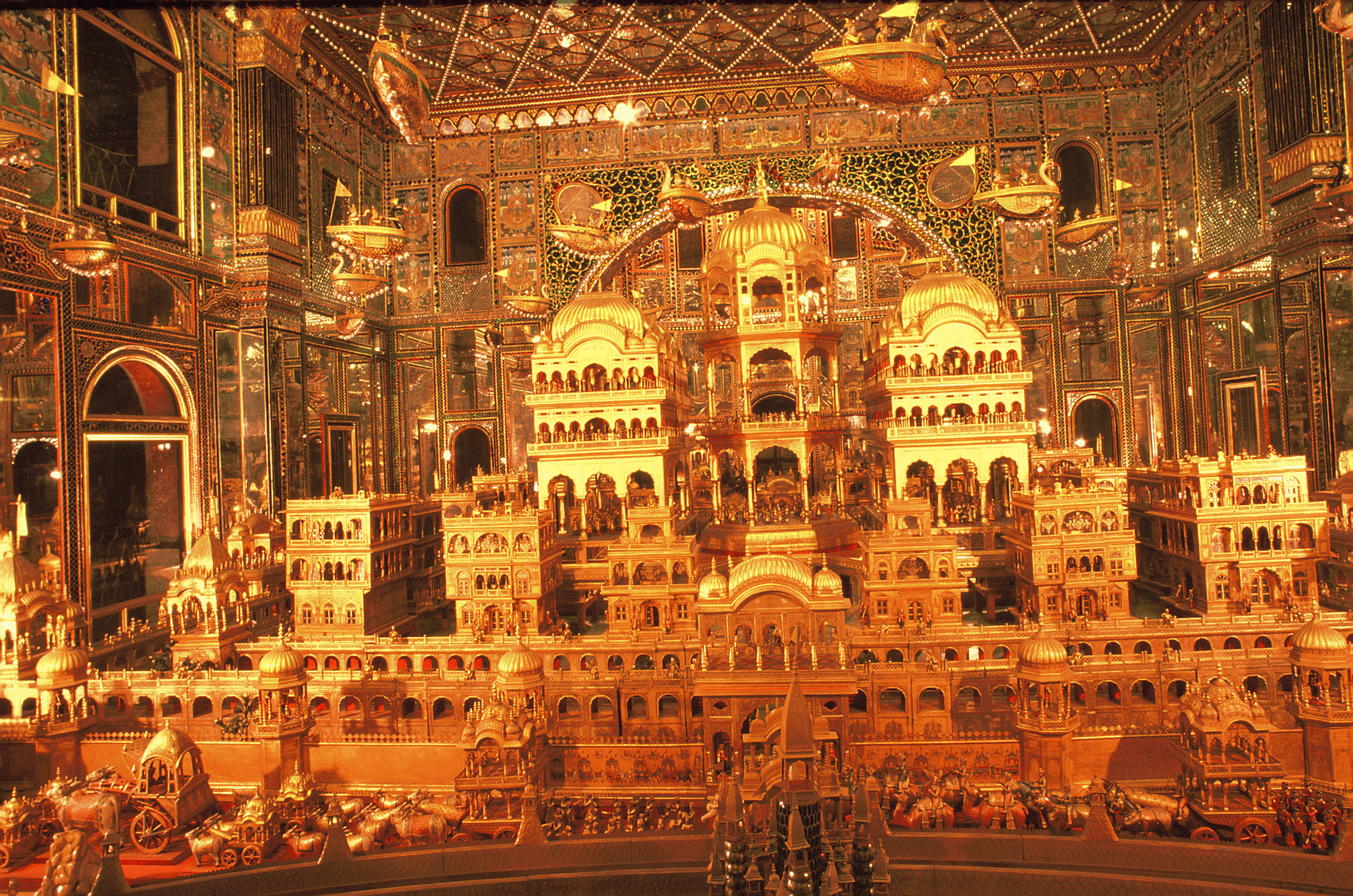
Gold carving depiction of the legendary Ayodhya at the Ajmer Jain temple

Ayodhya is a city mentioned in the ancient Sanskrit-language texts, including the Ramayana and the Mahabharata. These texts describe it as the capital of the Ikshvaku kings, including Rama. The epic Ramayana states that Rama was born to Kaushalya and King Dasharatha in Ayodhya, a city on the banks of Sarayu River.

The historicity of this legendary city is of concern to the Ayodhya dispute. According to one theory, it is same as the present-day Indian city of Ayodhya. According to another theory, it is a fictional city, and the present-day Ayodhya (originally called Saketa) was renamed after it around the 4th or 5th century, during the Gupta period.

== Scriptural references ==
According to the Ramayana, Ayodhya was founded by Manu, the progenitor of mankind, and measured 12x3 yojanas in area. Both the Ramayana and the Mahabharata describe Ayodhya as the capital of the Ikshvaku dynasty of Kosala, including Rama and Dasharatha. The Purana-pancha-lakshana also describes the city as the capital of Ikshvaku kings, including Harishchandra.

The Ramayana states that the city was ruled by king Dasharatha, a descendant of king Ikshvaku. His son Rama was exiled to the forest, and returned to the city after several travails, establishing an ideal rule in the kingdom. According to Uttara Kanda, a later addition to the Ramayana, Rama divided the kingdom into North and South Kosala at the end of his reign, with respective capitals at Shravasti and Kushavati, and installed his two sons (Lava and Kusha) to rule them. Rama himself entered the waters of the Sarayu river, along with all the inhabitants of the city, and ascended to heaven. The location where they ascended is Gopratara Tirtha, according to the Mahabharata. Ayodhya was subsequently repopulated by king Rishabha.

Several other literary works based on the story of Rama also mention Ayodhya. These include the Abhisheka and Pratimanataka by the poet Bhāsa (dated 2nd century CE or earlier), and the Raghuvamsha of Kalidasa (c. 5th century CE).

According to the Jain tradition, five tirthankaras were born at Ayodhya, including Rishabhanatha, Ajitanatha, Abhinandananatha, Sumatinatha, and Anantanatha.

== Historicity ==
=== Identification with present-day Ayodhya ===
Many modern scholars, including B. B. Lal and H. D. Sankalia, have identified the legendary Ayodhya with the present-day Ayodhya town, but this theory is not universally accepted.

Arguments cited in favour of this identification include:

- Several ancient texts, including the Ramayana, the Bhagavata Purana, and the Padma Purana, mention that the legendary Ayodhya was located on the banks of the Sarayu river, just like the modern Ayodhya.
- The Gupta-era texts, such as Kalidasa's Raghuvamsha and the Brahmanda Purana use "Ayodhya" as another name for Saketa, which was the ancient name of present-day Ayodhya. This identification also occurs in the later Sanskrit texts, including Hemachandra's Abhidhana-Chintamani and Yashodhara's commentary on Kamasutra.
- Several ancient texts, including the Vishnu Smriti and the Matsya Purana mention Ayodhya as a place of pilgrimage (tirtha). The 1092 CE Chandrawati inscription of the Gahadavala king Chandradeva mentions that he took bath on the Svarga-dvara tirtha situated on the confluence of the Sarayau and the Ghaghra rivers at Ayodhya.
- The epics describe the legendary Ayodhya as the capital of Kosala. A 1st century BCE inscription issued by Dhanadeva, who describes himself as the lord of Kosala, has been found at present-day Ayodhya. Several later inscriptions also mention the city of Ayodhya.

=== Identification as a legendary city ===
A section of scholars have argued that the legendary Ayodhya of Ramayana is a purely mythical city, and is not same as the present-day Ayodhya. These scholars include M. C. Joshi, Hans T. Bakker, and a group of 25 historians from the Jawaharlal Nehru University (JNU), among others. According to these scholars, the process of identifying the legendary Ayodhya with Saketa (an ancient name of present-day Ayodhya) began in the early centuries CE, and was completed during the Gupta period.

The various arguments made in favour of identifying the legendary Ayodhya as a fictional city include the following:

==== Lack of archaeological evidence ====
The JNU historians argue that according to the archaeological evidence, the earliest possible settlements at Ayodhya can be dated to c. 8th century BCE, while the Ramayana is set much earlier. The Ramayana depicts Ayodhya as an urban centre with palaces and buildings, while the excavations at present-day Ayodhya indicate a primitive life.

Hans T. Bakker notes that no place called Ayodhya is attested by any epigraphic or other archaeological evidence before the 2nd century CE. The earliest extant inscriptions mentioning a place called Ayodhya are from the Gupta period. For example, a 436 CE inscription describes a donation to Brahmins hailing from Ayodhya. A 533–534 CE inscription mentions a nobleman from Ayodhya. The Gaya inscription, said to be issued by Samudragupta (4th century CE), but possibly an 8th century fabrication according to modern historians, describes Ayodhya as a garrison town.

==== Lack of ancient literary evidence ====
Early Buddhist and Jain texts mention Shravasti and Saketa, not Ayodhya, as the major cities of the Kosala region. The later texts such as the Puranas, which mention Ayodhya as the capital of Kosala, simply follow the legendary Ramayana.

According to Hans T. Bakker's analysis, the Sanskrit sources that mention Ayodhya but not Saketa are predominantly fictional in nature: these texts include Mahabharata, Ramayana, and Purana-pancha-lakshana. On the other hand, the Sanskrit sources that mention Saketa but not Ayodhya are of "semi-scientific or factual nature". The Buddhist Pali-language texts name a city called Ayojjha or Ayujjha (Pali for Ayodhya), but suggest that it was located on the banks of the Ganges river (see below). In the early Jain canonical literature, "Aujjha" (a Prakrit form of "Ayodhya") is mentioned only once: the Thana Sutta describes it as the capital of Gandhilavati, a district of the "largely mythological" Mahavideha country. This indicates that the Ayodhya of Sanskrit epic literature is a fictional city.

Among the Sanskrit sources, the identification of Ayodhya with Saketa first appears in texts from the Gupta period, including the Brahmanda Purana and Kalidasa's Raghuvamsha. The Jain text Paumachariya (dated before 4th century CE) first incorporates the Rama legend into Jain mythology. During this period, the Jains linked the mythology of the Ikshvaku dynasty with their tirthankaras and chakravartins. For example, the first tirthankara Rishabha is said to have been born in Ikkhagabhumi (according to Kalpasutra) or Viniya (according to Jambu-dvipa-prajnapati), which are identified as Ayodhya (Aojhha) or Saketa. In the 19th century, Alexander Cunningham of Archaeological Survey of India believed that Ramayana also identifies Ayodhya with a Saketa, based on a verse that supposedly describes Dasharatha as the king of "Saketa-nagara". However, this verse was fabricated by a Brahmin of Lucknow: it is not found in the original Ramayana text.

==== Local Vikramaditya legend ====
A local oral tradition of Ayodhya, first recorded in writing by Robert Montgomery Martin in 1838, mentions that the city was deserted after the death of Rama's descendant Brihadbala. It remained deserted for several centuries until King Vikrama (or Vikramaditya) of Ujjain came searching for it. On the advice of a sage, Vikrama determined that the site of ancient Ayodhya as the place where the milk would flow from the udder of a calf. He cut down the forests that had covered the ancient ruins, established a new city, erected the Ramgar fort, and built 360 temples.

According to the JNU historians, this myth of "re-discovery" seems to recognize that modern Ayodhya is not same as the ancient Ayodhya, and appears to be an attempt to impart the modern town a religious sanctity that it originally lacked. These historians theorize that the 5th century emperor Skandagupta (who adopted the title Vikramditya) moved his residence to Saketa, and renamed it to Ayodhya, probably to associate himself with the legendary solar dynasty. According to Bakker, the Guptas moved their capital to Saketa either during the reign of Kumaragupta I or Skandagupta, and this event is possibly alluded to in the Raghuvamsha.

Kishore Kunal argues that there is no historical evidence to support the theory that Saketa was renamed as "Ayodhya" by Skandagupta. He notes that the Kalidasa's Raghuvamsha clearly refers to the same city by the names "Saketa" and "Ayodhya", while narrating the legend of Rama. Historian Gyanendra Pandey argues that Kalidasa's mention of "Saketa" and "Ayodhya" do not prove any connection between the legendary Ayodhya and the present-day Ayodhya, as he lived in the Gupta period (c. 5th century CE), presumably after the Guptas had changed the name of Saketa to "Ayodhya".

==== Relatively recent association with Rama ====
The rise of the modern Ayodhya town as a centre of Rama worship is relatively recent, dating back to the 13th century, when the Ramanandi sect started gaining prominence. Several inscriptions dated between 5th and 8th centuries mention the town, but do not mention its association with Rama. The writings of Xuanzang (c. 602–664 CE) associate the town with Buddhism. It has also been an important Jain pilgrimage centre, and an ancient Jain figure (dated 4th-3rd century BCE) has been found here. The 11th century texts refer to Gopataru tirtha in Ayodhya, but do not refer to the birthplace of Rama.

Bakker notes that the legend of Rama was not always connected with Ayodhya: for example, the Buddhist Dasaratha-jataka mentions Varanasi, not Ayodhya, as the capital of Dasharatha and Rama. Thus, the association of Rama with Ayodhya may be a result the claim that he was a member of the Ikshvaku family, and this family's association with Ayodhya.

==== Analysis of Ramayana ====
According to M. C. Joshi, "a critical examination of the geographical data available in Valmiki's narratives does not justify the commonly accepted identification of the ancient city with the modern one". For example, in the Ayodhya Kanda of the Ramayana, Bharata takes a geographically "non-sensical" route while traveling to Ayodhya from the kingdom of his uncle Kekeya (located in the extreme west of the Indian subcontinent). During this journey, he passes through places located in present-day Odisha and Assam.

==== Location on the banks of the Ganges ====
According to Hans T. Bakker, the older parts of Mahabharata and Purana-pancha-lakshana mention Ayodhya as the capital of the Ikshvaku kings, but do not state that it was situated on the banks of the Sarayu river. The older parts of Ramayana only suggest that it was located in the vicinity of the Sarayu river. For example, Ramayana 2.70.19 states that the funeral processions of Dasharatha traveled from the city to Sarayu using palanquins and chariots, which according to Bakker, suggests that Sarayu was located at some distance from the city. According to Bakker, only the newer (5th century and later) parts of Ramayana explicitly describe Ayodhya as located on the banks of the Sarayu river.

The JNU historians agree that an ancient historical city called "Ayodhya" (Pali: Ayojjha or Ayujjha) existed, but argue that it was not same as the modern Ayodhya, or the legendary city described in the Ramayana. This theory is based on the fact that according to the ancient Buddhist texts, the ancient Ayodhya town was located on the banks of the river Ganga (Ganges), not Sarayu. For example, the Samyutta Nikaya states "Once Lord Buddha was walking in Ayodhya on the bank of the Ganga river". Buddhaghosha's commentary on the Samyutta Nikaya mentions that the citizens of Ayodhya (Ayujjha-pura) built a vihara for the Buddha "in a curve of the river Ganga".

Kishore Kunal argues that the word "Ganga" is also used as common noun for a holy river in Sanskrit. In his support, he presents another verse from Samyutta Nikaya (4.35.241.205), which states "Once Lord Buddha was walking in Kaushambi on the bank of the Ganga river". The ancient city of Kaushambi was actually located on the banks of the river Yamuna, not Ganga. S. N. Arya similarly points out that the 7th century Chinese Buddhist traveler Xuanzang states that he reached Ayodhya ("A-yu-te") after crossing the Ganga river, while traveling southwards (Ayodhya is actually located to the north of the Ganges river). Xuanzang seems to have used the term Ganga to describe "a long affluent of the great river".

==== Taittiriya Aranyaka and Atharvaveda description ====
M. C. Joshi asserted that Ayodhya is mentioned in a Taittiriya Aranyaka verse, which is also found with some variations in the Atharvaveda:

aṣṭācakrā navadvārā devānāṃ pūrayodhyā
tasyāṃ hiraṇyayaḥkośaḥ svargo loko jyotiṣāvṛtaḥ
yo vai tāṃ brahmaṇo vedāmṛtenāvṛtāṃ puram
tasmai brahma ca brāhmā ca āyuḥ kirtim prajāṃ daduḥ
vibhrājamānām hariṇīṃ yaśasā saṃparīvṛtām
puraṃ hiraṇyayīṃ brahmā viveśāparājitām

— Taittiriya Aranyaka 1.27
Translation:

Ayodhya (impregnable), the city of the gods, consists of eight circles (also cycles) and nine entrances;
within it there is the golden treasure-dome, the celestial world, ever-illuminated with light (north pole).
Whoever knows it as the Creator's city ever surrounded with nectar
will have long life, fame, and offspring bestowed on him, by Brahma (the sun), and Brahma (the moon).
Into this city ever shining, moving, and pervaded with Yasas (fame and lustre),
the Creator has entered.

— Translation by M. C. Joshi

Joshi argues that the Ayodhya city, as described in the Taittiriya Aranyaka (and Atharvaveda), is obviously a mythical city, because it is said to be surrounded by a pool of nectar, and is described as the location of "the golden treasure-dome of the celestial world". According to Joshi, this Ayodhya is similar to the mythical places such as Samavasarana and Nandishvaradvipa, which appear in the Jain mythology.

According to other scholars, such as B. B. Lal, the word ayodhya in this context is not a proper noun (the name of a city), but an adjective, meaning "impregnable". The verse describes the human body (pur) as having eight chakras and nine orifices:

aṣṭācakrā navadvārā devānāṃ pūrayodhyā
tasyāṃ hiraṇyayaḥkośaḥ svargo jyotiṣāvṛtaḥ

— Atharvaveda 10.2.31
Translation:

Eight-wheeled, nine-doored, is the impregnable stronghold of the gods;
in that is a golden vessel, heaven-going (swarga), covered with light

— Translation by William Dwight Whitney

Lal points out that two cognate forms ayodhyena and ayodhyaḥ appear in Atharvaveda 19.13.3 and 19.13.7 respectively, in similar sense of "invincible". The 14th century commentator Sayana also confirms this meaning of the word. the later text Bhagavad Gita also describes the human body as a city with nine doors, in which the soul resides. This confirms that the Atharvaveda uses "ayodhya" as an adjective, not as the name of a city.
