= Solar dynasty =

Legendary Indian dynasty

House of Ikshvaku Suryavamsha
- Country: Kingdom of Kosala, Kingdom of Videha, Shakya Kingdom
- Founder: Ikshvaku
- Final ruler: Sumitra (historical claimant)
- Style: Raja of Kosala
- Deposition: 362 BCE

The Solar dynasty or Suryavamsha (Sanskrit: सूर्यवंश, romanized: Sūryavaṃśa, lit. 'Sun's lineage'), also called the Ikshvaku dynasty, is a lineage or dynasty said to have been founded by King Ikshvaku. In Hindu literature, it ruled the Kosala Kingdom, with its capital at Ayodhya, and later at Shravasti. They worshipped their clan deity, Surya (a Hindu solar deity), after whom the dynasty is named. Along with the Lunar dynasty, the Solar dynasty comprises one of the main lineages in Hinduism.

According to Jain literature, the first Tirthankara of Jainism, Rishabhanatha himself, was King Ikshvaku. Twenty-one further Tirthankaras were born in this dynasty.

According to Buddhist literature, Gautama Buddha descended from this dynasty.

The important personalities belonging to this royal house are Mandhatri, Muchukunda, Ambarisha, Bharata, Bahubali, Harishchandra, Dilīpa, Sagara, Raghu, Dasharatha, Rama, and Pasenadi. Both the Hindu Puranas and the Buddhist texts include Shuddodhana, Gautama Buddha, and Rahula in their accounts of the Ikshvaku dynasty but, according to the Buddhist texts, Mahasammata, an ancestor of Ikshvaku who was elected by the people as the first king of the present era, was the founder of this dynasty.

== Origins ==
Suryavamsha, or the Solar Dynasty, is one of the two major legendary Kshatriya dynasties found in Hindu Puranic and epic literature, the other being Chandravamsha or the Lunar dynasty. According to the Harivamsha, Ikshvaku is considered the primogenitor of the dynasty of, and was granted the kingdom of Aryavarta by his father Vaivasvata Manu. Manu settled down in the Aryavarta region after he survived the great flood. A. K. Mozumdar states that Manu is the one who built a city on the Sarayu (being the river that his mother Sanjana was the goddess of) and called it Ayodhya meaning the 'invincible city'. This city served as the capital of many kings from the solar dynasty and is also believed to be the birthplace of Rama.

Some Hindu texts suggest Rishi Marichi, one of the seven sages and first human creations of Brahma as the progenitor of the dynasty. Marichi's eldest son, Kashyapa, is said to have settled down in Kashmir (Kashyapa-Meru or Kashyameru). He also contributed to the verses of the Vedas. Later, Vivasvan, son of Kashyapa and Aditi, famously known as the Hindu god Surya, married Saranyu who was the daughter of Vishvakarman, the architect of devas. He had many children, but Manu was given the responsibility of building the civilization. As a result it formed a dynasty that was named Suryavamsha or the solar dynasty. Manu is also the progenitor of the Lunar Dynasty because he married his daughter Ila to Budha, the son of Chandra or the moon god. The couple gave birth to King Pururavas, who became the first king of the Chandravamsha, or the Lunar dynasty.

== Historical claimants ==
After the death of the powerful king Prasenjit and disappearance of his successor Viḍūḍabha after defeating the Shakyas, the kingdom of Kosala declined. King Sumitra, who regarded himself to be the last Suryavamsha ruler, was defeated by the powerful emperor Mahapadma Nanda of Magadha in 362 BCE. However, he wasn't killed, and fled to Rohtas, located in present-day Bihar.

== Bhagavata Purana ==
Ikshvaku and his ancestor Manu are also mentioned in the Bhagavata Purana (Canto 9, Chapter 1),

योऽसौ सत्यव्रतो नाम राजर्षिर्द्रविडेश्वर: ।
ज्ञानं योऽतीतकल्पान्ते लेभे पुरुषसेवया ॥

स वै विवस्वत: पुत्रो मनुरासीदिति श्रुतम् ।
त्वत्तस्तस्य सुता:प्रोक्ता इक्ष्वाकुप्रमुखा नृपा: ॥

yo ’sau satyavrato nāma
rājarṣir draviḍeśvaraḥ
jñānaṁ yo ’tīta-kalpānte
lebhe puruṣa-sevayā

sa vai vivasvataḥ putro
manur āsīd iti śrutam
tvattas tasya sutāḥ proktā
ikṣvāku-pramukhā nṛpāḥ

Translation:

Satyavrata, the saintly king of Dravida kingdom, received spiritual knowledge at the end of the last millennium by the grace of the Supreme.

He became known as Vaivasvata Manu, the son of Vivasvān.

In the next manvantara [period of Manu], I will have received this knowledge from you.

I also understand that such kings as Ikṣvāku were his sons, as you have already explained.

== Buddhism ==
The Buddhist text, Buddhavaṃsa and Mahāvaṃsa (II, 1–24) traces the origin of the Shakyas to king Okkaka (Pali equivalent to Sanskrit Ikshvaku) and gives their genealogy from Mahasammata, an ancestor of Okkaka. This list comprises the names of a number of prominent kings of the Ikshvaku dynasty, namely, Mandhata and Sagara. The genealogy according to the Mahavamsa is as follows:

1. Okkāka
2. Okkāmukha
3. Sivisamjaya
4. Sihassara
5. Jayasena
6. Sihahanu
7. Suddhodana
8. Gautama Buddha
9. Rāhula

== Jainism ==
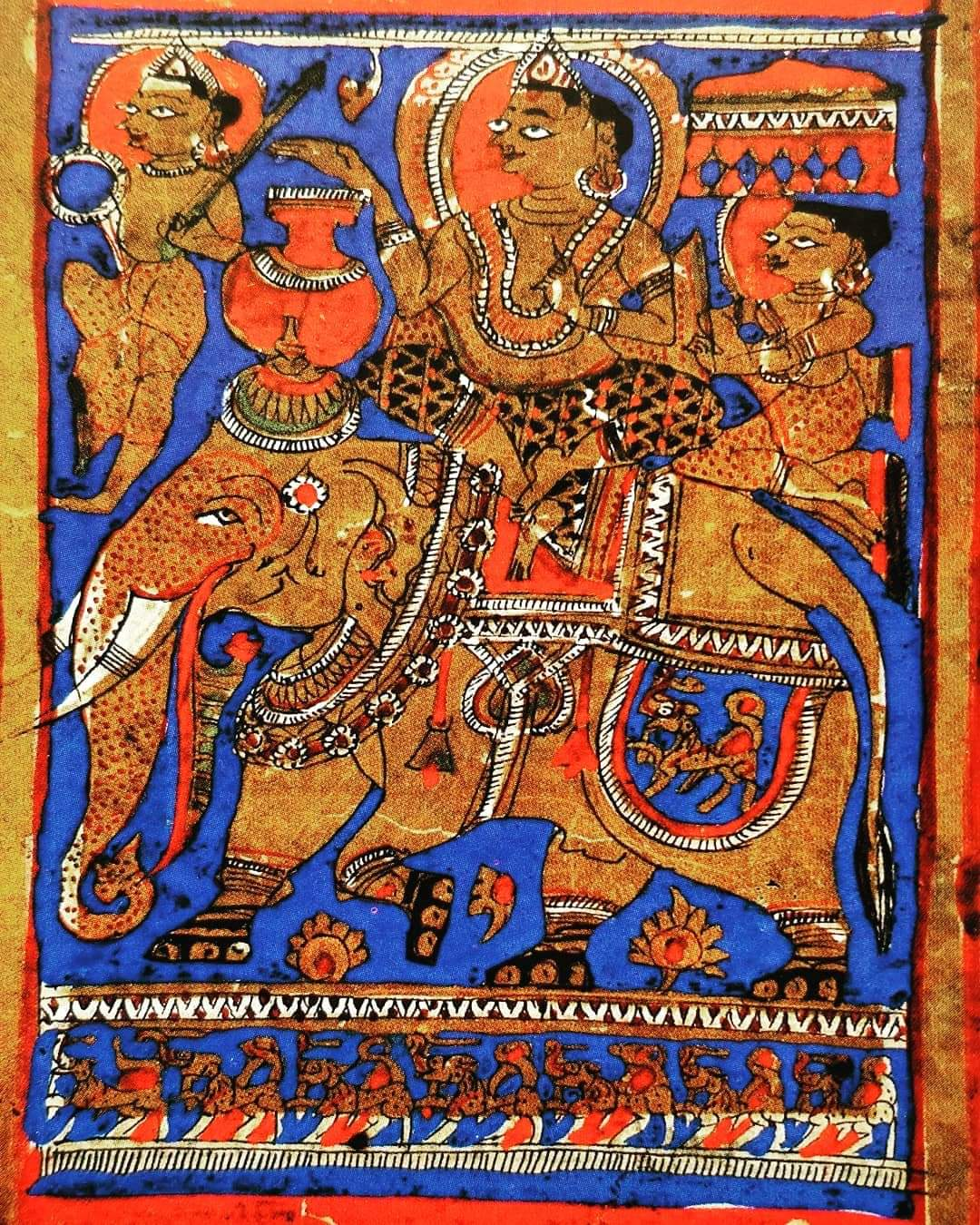
Medieval era Indian art depicting King Ikshvaku (Rishabhanatha) imparting the skill of pottery to his people.

Rishabhanatha, the first Tirthankara, is identified with King Ikshvaku and the founder of the Ikshvaku dynasty. The earliest recorded reference to the Ikshvaku dynasty can be found in the Swayambhustotra, a Sanskrit epic poem composed by Acharya Samantabhadra, a Jain poet originally from Tamil Nadu. The Swayambhustotra praises the 24 Tirthankaras, including Rishabhanatha, and mentions the lineage of the Ikshvaku dynasty:

Rishabhanatha or Ikshvaku, the first of the kings of the Ikshvaku dynasty, was the seeker of liberation, won over His senses to get established in the pure Self, independent, endured afflictions, and steadfast in His resolve. He relinquished the expanse of the faithful lady earth, clothed, as it were, up to the ocean, and embraced the noble asceticism. The Ikshvaku dynasty has a significant place in Jainism, as twenty-two Tirthankaras were born in this dynasty.

- Origin
  - Rishabhanatha (son of King Nabhi), the founder of Jainism in the present Avasarpani era (descending half time cycle as per Jain cosmology and Manvantara in hindu cosmology) is said to have founded the Ikshvaku dynasty. The name for the Ikshvaku dynasty comes from the word ikhsu (sugarcane), another name of Rishabhanatha, because he taught people how to extract ikshu-rasa (sugarcane-juice).
  - Bharata Chakravarti (first Chakravartin) and Bahubali (first Kamadeva), sons of Rishabha
  - Arkakirti and Marichi, son of Bharata
- at the time of Ajitanatha
  - Jitashatru (father of Ajitanatha) and his younger brother Sumitra (father of Sagara)
  - Ajitanatha (the 2nd Tirthankara) and Sagara (2nd Chakravartin)
  - Janhu (eldest son of Sagara), the one who flooded village of Nagas with waters of Ganga leading to turning of sixty thousand sons of Sagara into ashes by Jawalanprabha (emperor of Nagas)
  - Bhagiratha (eldest grandson of Sagara)
- at the time of Sambhavanatha
  - Jitari (father of Sambhavanatha)
  - Sambhavanatha, the 3rd Tirthankara
- at the time of Abhinandananatha
  - Sanvara (father of Abhinandananatha)
  - Abhinandananatha, the 4th Tirthankara
- at the time of Sumatinatha
  - Megha (father of Sumatinatha)
  - Sumatinatha, the 5th Tirthankara
- at the time of Padmaprabha
  - Sidhara (father of Padmaprabha)
  - Padmaprabha, the 6th Tirthankara
- at the time of Suparshvanatha
  - Pratishtha (father of Suparshvanatha)
  - Suparshvanatha, the 7th Tirthankara
- at the time of Chandraprabha
  - Mahasena (father of Chanraprabha)
  - Chandraprabha, the 8th Tirthankara
- at the time of Pushpadanta
  - Sugriva (father of Pushpadanta)
  - Pushpadanta, the 9th Tirthankara
- at the time of Shitalanatha
  - Dridharatha (father of Shitalnatha)
  - Shitalanatha, the 10th Tirthankara
- at the time of Shreyanasanatha
  - Vishnu (father of Shreyanasanatha)
  - Shreyanasanatha, the 11th Tirthankara
- at the time of Vasupujya
  - Vasupujya (father of Tirthankara Vasupujya)
  - Vasupujya, the 12th Tirthankara
- at the time of Vimalanatha
  - Kritavarma (father of Vimalanatha)
  - Vimalanatha, the 13th Tirthankara
- at the time of Anantanatha
  - Simhasena (father of Anantanatha)
  - Anantanatha, the 14th Tirthankara
- at the time of Dharmanatha
  - Bhanu (father of Dharmanatha)
  - Dharmanatha, the 15th Tirthankara
- at the time of Shantinatha
  - Vishvasena (father of Shantinatha)
  - Shantinatha, the 16th Tirthankara and 5th Chakravarti
  - Chakrayudha, son of Shantinatha
  - Kuruchandra, son of Chakrayudha
- at the time of Kunthunatha
  - Sura (father of Kunthunatha)
  - Kunthunatha, the 17th Tirthankara and 6th Chakravarti
- at the time of Aranatha
  - Sudarsana (father of Aranatha)
  - Arahnatha, the 18th Tirthankara and 7th Chakravarti
- at the time of Mallinatha
  - Kumbha (father of Mallinatha)
  - Māllīnātha, the 19th Tirthankara
- at the time of Munisuvrata
  - Dasharatha (father of Rama)
  - Padma/Rama, the 8th Balabhadra
  - Lakshmana, the 8th Vasudeva
  - Madanankusha (son of Rama)
  - Anangalavana (son of Rama)
- at the time of Naminatha
  - Vijaya (father of Naminatha)
  - Naminatha, the 21st Tirthankara
- at the time of Parshvanatha
  - Asvasena (father of Parshvanatha)
  - Parshvanatha, the 23rd Tirthankara
- at the time of Mahavira
  - Siddhartha (father of Mahavira)
  - Mahavira, the 24th Tirthankara

== Rulers ==
=== Suryavamsha Kings before Rama ===
1. Vaivasvata Manu or Satyavrata or Nabhi
2. Ikshvaku
3. Kukshi or Vikukshi (Note: Vikukshi is the son of Kukshi in the Balakanda.) or Śaśāda
4. Bāna or Shakuni
5. Kakutstha or Puranjaya (Purañjaya) or Anaranya I
6. Anena (Anenā) (Note: also depicted as son of Vikukshi)
7. Prithu (Pṛthu)
8. Vishtarashva (Viṣṭarāśva), Visvarandhi, or Viśvagandhi
9. Chandra (Cāndra-yuvanāśva)
10. Yuvanashva I (Yuvanāśva)
11. Shravasta (Śrāvasta)
12. Brihadashva (Bṛhadaśva)
13. Dhundumārashva (Dhundhumārashva) or Kuvalayashva (Kuvalayāśva)
14. Dhreedhashva (Dṛḍhāśva) or Kapilashva (Kapilāśva) or Bhadrashva (Bhadrāśva)
15. Pramoda
16. Haryashva I
17. Nikumbha
18. Baharnashva (Barhaṇāśva)
19. Giritashva
20. Amitashva (Amitāśva)
21. Krishashva (Kṛśāśva) or Akrutashva
22. Prasenajit I
23. Yuvanashva II
24. Mandhata
25. Purukutsa I (or Vasuda) and Muchukunda
26. Ambarisha
27. Trasadasyu
28. Sambhruta
29. Anaranya II
30. Preeshadashva
31. Haryashva II
32. Hastya
33. Sumana
34. Tridhanva
35. Trayyaruni
36. Trishanku or Satyavrata II
37. Harishchandra
38. Rohitashva
39. Harita
40. Chanchu
41. Chakshu or Sudeva
42. Vijaya
43. Ruruka or Brahuka
44. Pratapendra
45. Bruka
46. Sushandhi
47. Bahuka
48. Vrika or Bharata II
49. Bahu or Asita
50. Sagara
51. Amshuman
52. Dilipa I
53. Bhagiratha
54. Suhotra
55. Shruti
56. Kukutsa II
57. Raghu I
58. Nabhaga
59. Ambarisha II
60. Shindhudvipa
61. Ayutayu
62. Pratayu
63. Rituparna
64. Sarvakama I
65. Sudasa
66. Kalmashapada
67. Asmaka (Aśmaka)
68. Mulaka or Sarvakama II
69. Dasharatha I
70. Ilibil or Ananaranya III
71. Vishvamashaha
72. Nidhna
73. Animitra (Anamitra)
74. Duliduh or Mūlaka
75. Dilipa II or Dirghabhahu or Khaṭvāṅga
76. Raghu II
77. Aja
78. Dasharatha II
79. Bharata III
80. Rama

=== Suryavamsha Kings after Rama ===
1. Kusha and Lava
2. Atithi
3. Nishadha
4. Nala II
5. Nabhas
6. Paundrika
7. Kshemadhanva
8. Devanika
9. Ahinagu
10. Ruru
11. Pariyatra
12. Sala
13. Dala
14. Bala
15. Uktha
16. Sahasrasva
17. Para II
18. Chandravaloka
19. Rudraksh
20. Chandragiri
21. Banuchandra
22. Srutayu
23. Uluka
24. Unnabha
25. Vajranabha
26. Sankhana
27. Vyusitasva
28. Visvasaha
29. Hiranyanabha Kausalya
30. Para III
31. Brahmistha
32. Putra
33. Pusya
34. Arthasidhi
35. Dhruvasandhi
36. Sudarsana
37. Agnivarna
38. Sighraga
39. Maru
40. Parsusruta
41. Susandhi
42. Amarsana
43. Mahasvana
44. Sahasvana
45. Visrutvana
46. Visvabhava
47. Visvasahva
48. Nagnajit
49. Brihadbala

== See also ==
- Hinduism
- Kosala kingdom
- Ramayana
- Rama
- Ikshvaku
- Lunar dynasty
- List of Hindu empires and dynasties
- List of Jain states and dynasties

== Sources ==
- Zimmer, Heinrich (1952), Joseph Campbell (ed.), Philosophies of India, London: Routledge & Kegan Paul Ltd, ISBN 978-81-208-0739-6
- Shah, Natubhai (2004), Jainism: The World of Conquerors, Motilal Banarsidass, ISBN 978-81-208-1938-2
- Jain, Kailash Chand (1991), Lord Mahavira and his times, Delhi: Motilal Banarsidass, ISBN 978-81-208-0805-8
- A.K.Mazumdar (2008). The Hindu history. Rupa Publications India. ISBN 978-81-86772-17-1.

Preceded by Kulakara (in Jainism)	Ikshvaku Dynasty	Succeeded by
