= MeMeraki =

Indian culture-technology company

- Type: Private
- Industry: Culture-technology, E-commerce
- Founded: 2019
- Founders: Yosha Gupta
- Headquarters: Gurugram, Haryana
- Products: Enterprise art projects, Online workshops, Handcrafted products
- Services: Craft led Commissions and Installations, Craft Educational Programs and Workshops, Artworks and Curated Craft Collections
- Website: www.memeraki.com

MeMeraki is an Indian culture-technology company founded in 2019. It is headquartered in Gurugram, Haryana, India.

== History ==
MeMeraki was founded in 2019 by Yosha Gupta as a "digital platform" connecting traditional Indian artisans with broader audiences.

Prior to founding MeMeraki, Gupta launched a cashback platform "LafaLafa" in 2014. It was mentioned in Gadgets 360’s coverage of Indian startup funding activity in 2016.

In January 2026, MeMeraki and its team appeared in Shark Tank India season 5 and secured Rs. 1 crore. It also received an undisclosed institutional funding from "Next Bharat Ventures", the impact investment arm backed by Suzuki Motor Corporation, Japan.

The company brought together many craft traditions of India including the Kalamkari traditions of Andhra Pradesh and Tamil Nadu, along with the Mata Ni Pachedi tradition of Gujarat.
