= Vahana =

Mounts of Hindu deities

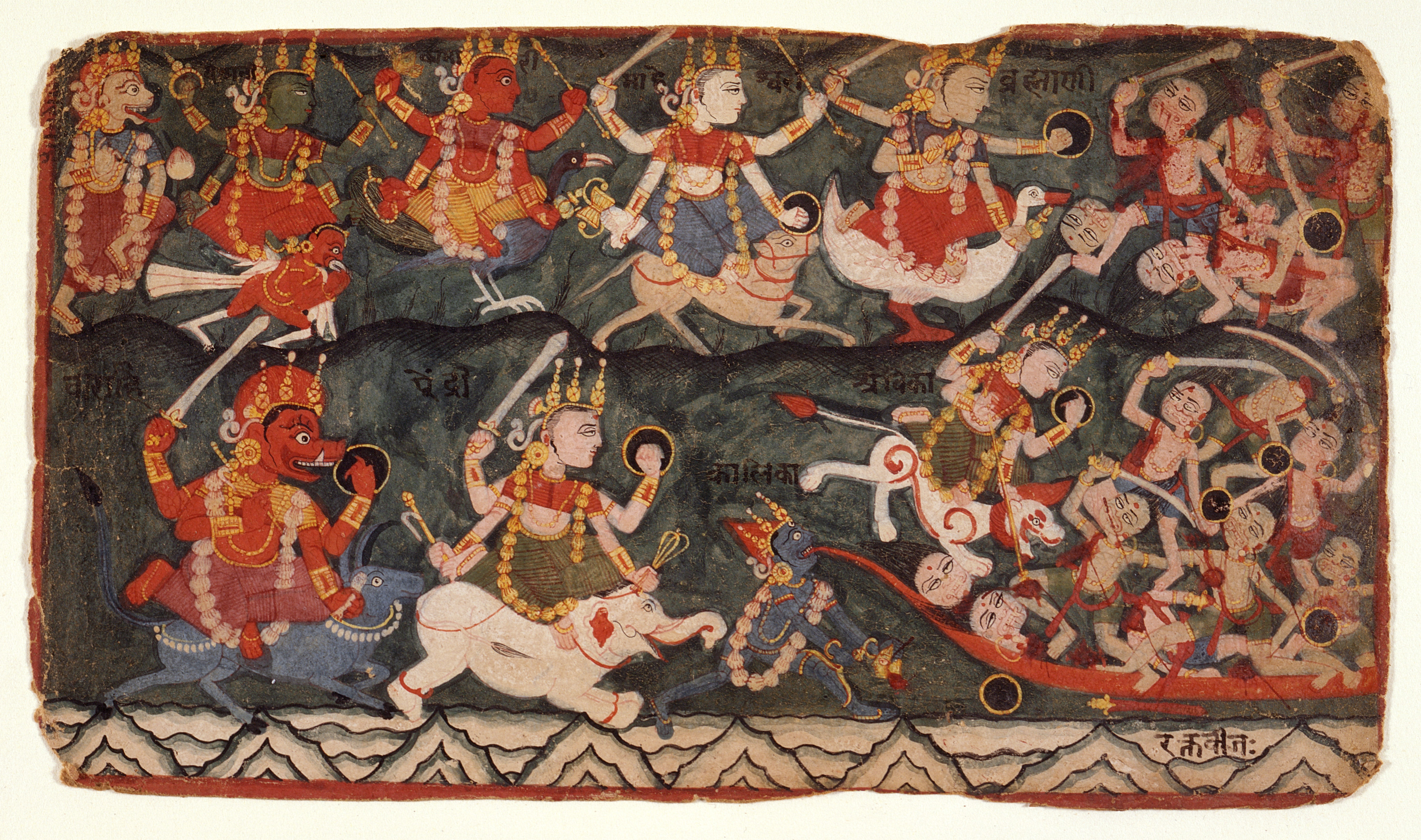
The eight Matrikas riding different vāhana like (top row, second from left to right) Garuda, a peacock, Nandi bull, a hamsa (goose/swan); (bottom row, from left) buffalo, elephant and lion

The vāhana (Sanskrit: वाहन, romanized: vāhana, lit. 'that which carries') or vahanam (Sanskrit: वाहनम्, romanized: vāhanam) denotes the being, typically an animal or mythical entity, a particular Hindu deity is said to use as a vehicle. In this capacity, the vāhana is often called the deity's "mount". Upon the partnership between the deity and his vāhana is woven into much iconography and Hindu theology. Deities are often depicted riding (or simply mounted upon) the vāhana. Other times, the vāhana is depicted at the deity's side or symbolically represented as a divine attribute. The vāhana may be considered an accoutrement of the deity: though the vāhana may act independently, they are still functionally emblematic of or even viewed as an extension of their "rider". The deity may be seen sitting or standing on the vāhana. The deity may be sitting on a small platform, riding on a saddle, or riding bareback on the vāhana.

== Etymology ==
Vah in Sanskrit means to carry or transport. The word also means 'vehicle' in Sanskrit and other Indian languages.

== Symbolism ==
In Hindu iconography, the positive attributes of a divine vehicle are often emblematic of the deity it carries. Nandi the bull and vehicle of Shiva, represents strength and virility. Dinka the mouse and vehicle of Ganesha, represents speed and sharpness. Parvani the peacock and vehicle of Kartikeya, represents splendor and majesty. The hamsa, the vehicle of Saraswati, represents wisdom, grace, and beauty.

However, a divine mount also symbolizes the negative or destructive forces over which the deity triumphs. Mounted on Parvani, Kartikeya reins in the peacock's vanity. Seated upon Dinka, the rat (Mushika), Ganesha subdues erratic thoughts, which multiply like rodents in the dark. Shani, the protector of property, rides a vulture, raven, or crow, whose thieving tendencies he represents. Under Shani's influence, the vahana can turn even malevolent events into sources of hope.

== Examples ==
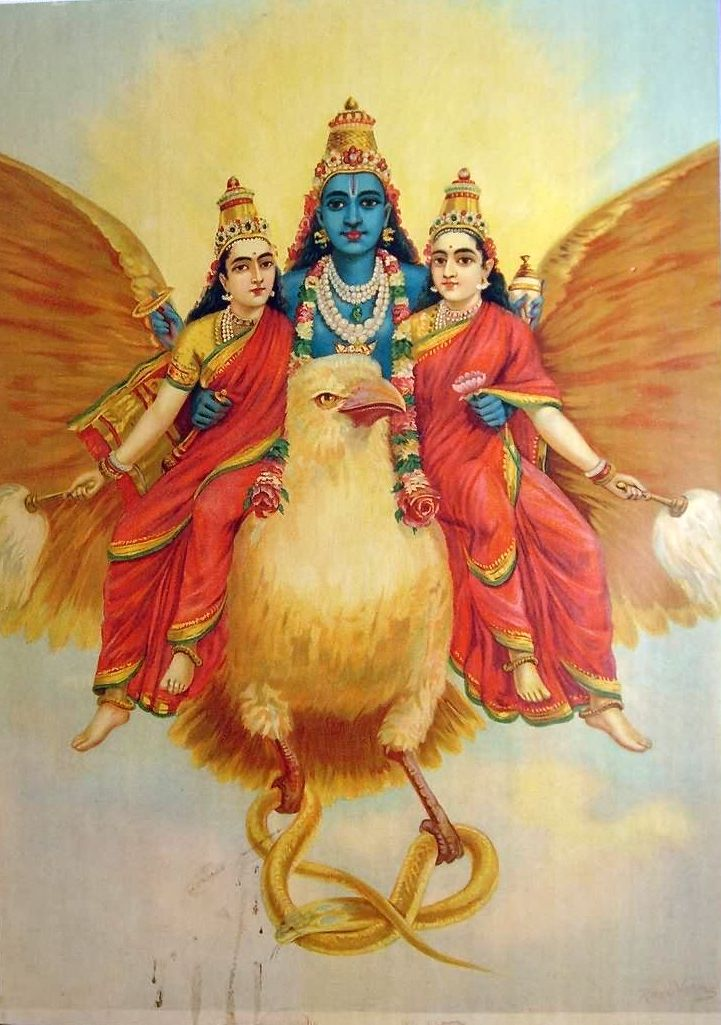
Garuda, with God Vishnu riding with his consorts

=== Garuda ===
Garuda and the story of how he became the mount of Vishnu are richly detailed in Hindu texts. Born to Vinata through the power of Kashyapa's penance, the demigod was anguished to find that his mother had been enslaved by her co-wife, the cruel Kadru. When he pleaded with Kadru to free his mother, she demanded amrita, the nectar of immortality, as the price of her freedom. His quest to secure amrita is described in the Mahabharata episode known as the Amṛtakalaśāpaharaṇam:

Garuḍa approached the pot of nectar, and Viśvakarmā who attacked him first was felled to the ground. The dust storm raised by the waving of Garuḍa’s wings blinded everybody. The Devas and Indra, nay, even the sun and the Moon lined up against Garuḍa, but he defeated them all, and entered the particular place where the pot of nectar was kept. Two terrific wheels were rotating round the pot and they would cut into mince-meat anybody who tried to lay hands on the pot and a machine circled the wheels. Below the wheels were two monstrous serpents with glowing eyes and protruding tongues like flashes of fire, and the serpents never closed their eyes. The very look with those eyes was enough to poison anyone to death. Garuḍa blinded those eyes by raising a torrent of dust, pierced them in the middle with his beak and through the hole, his body reduced to such a tiny shape, went nearer to the pot. He destroyed the wheels and the machine, and carrying the pot of nectar in his beaks rose to the sky shielding the light of the sun by his outspread wings. Mahāviṣṇu, who became so much pleased with the tremendous achievements of Garuḍa asked him to choose any boon. Garuḍa requested Viṣṇu that he should be made his (Viṣṇu's) vehicle and rendered immortal without his tasting amṛta. Both the boons were granted.

— Vettam Mani, Puranic Encyclopaedia, Garuḍa (Garuḍa goes to Devaloka and steals the Pot of Nectar)

=== Mushaka ===
Statue of Mushaka at the Shree Vighnaharta Ganesh Mandir in Koparkhairane, Navi Mumbai.

While Ganesha was still a child, a giant mouse began to terrorize his friends. Ganesha trapped the creature with his lasso (pasha) and made him his mount. Mushaka was originally a gandharva, or celestial musician. After absent-mindedly stepping on the feet of a rishi (sage) named Vamadeva, Mushaka was cursed and transformed into a demon mouse. However, once the rishi calmed his anger, he promised Mushaka that one day the devas themselves would bow down before him. This prophecy was fulfilled when the mouse became the vahana of Ganesha.

=== Nandi ===
Before becoming the vahana of Shiva, Nandi was a deity called Nandikeshvara, the lord of joy and master of music and dance. Over time, his name and artistic attributes were absorbed into the aspect of Shiva known as Nataraja. From an anthropomorphic or semi-bovine form, he has been represented primarily as a bull. Since then a statue of Nandi has guarded the entrance of virtually every Shiva temple, perpetually facing the inner shrine.

=== Paravani ===
Kartikeya, the war god known as Murugan in South India, is mounted on a peacock named Paravani. This peacock was originally a demon named Surapadma, while his banner's rooster was originally a demon named Krichi. After battling Murugan, the demon repented as Murugan's divine spear (vel) descended upon him. Surapadma transformed himself into a mango tree to evade death, but when Murugan split the tree in two, one half became a rooster, which he made his battle emblem, and other became a peacock, which he chose as his mount (vahana).

In another version, Kartikeya was born specifically to kill the demon Tarakasura. Raised by the Krittikas, he was appointed commander of divine armies when he was only six days old. After defeating Tarakasura, Kartikeya forgave his fallen foe and transformed him into his mount, the peacock.

=== Yali ===
The Yali is a mythical creature that combines the features of a lion, elephant, serpant and sometimes a horse. It is used as an important vahana in South Indian Hindu traditions. It represents strength and majesty. Silver or gold-plated wooden procession mounts (Yali vahanam) are used during annual temple festivals such as Brahmotsavam to carry the deities of Vishnu. In Navagraha iconography, Budha (Mercury) is also sometimes depicted as riding a Yali.

== Compared to other belief systems ==
The animal correspondences of Hindu divine vehicles (vahana) are not consistent with Greek and Roman mythology or other belief systems that tie a specific animal to a particular deity. For example, the Hindu goddess Lakshmi is associated with elephants, an owl, or—a rare non-animal vehicle—a lotus blossom. The ancient Greek goddess Athena also had an owl as her emblem, but the symbolic meaning assigned to owls in the two traditions differ significantly, as do the roles of goddesses themselves.

Lakshmi is primarily the goddess of wealth and prosperity, and her owl serves as a warning against greed, isolationism, and selfishness. By contrast, Athena is primarily the goddess of wisdom, with her owl symbolizing erudition, secret knowledge and scholarship. The Greco-Roman interpretation is paralleled in Roman Catholic iconography, in which St. Jerome, famed for translating the Vulgate, is often depicted with an owl symbolizing wisdom and scholarship. Depending on the tribe, Native American traditions ascribe diverse meanings to the owl—both positive and negative—as do Ainu and Russian folklore, but none match the specific symbolism assigned to Lakshmi's owl.

Some scholars argue that similar cross-cultural comparisons for other Hindu vahana show that parallels with animal symbols elsewhere are either coincidental or inevitable (such as linking bulls to virility) rather than evidence of shared origin. Conversely, theologians argue that each vahana, as an aspect of ishta-devata (or an asura in its own right), embodies unique spiritual wisdom; while comparative analysis offer insight, true understanding is not served by reducing distinct cultural symbols to homogeneous meanings.

== List of vahanas ==
Vahana	Deities associated	Image
Mouse mushaka	Ganesha (pictured); Vinayaki; Karni Mata	Ganesha riding his mouse
Horse	Kalki, Revanta, Chandra, Surya (pictured), Khandoba, Ayyanar, Ushas; Mhalsa	framless
Garuda (pictured)	Vishnu, Krishna, Rama, Vaishnavi	
Yali	Vishnu	
Nandi (pictured)	Shiva, Maheshvari, Ishana; Ishvari	
Ram	Agni (pictured), Mangala; Svaha; Dhavdi Mata	
Peacock	Kartikeya (pictured), Kaumari; Saraswati	
Dog	Bhairava (pictured); Hadkai mata	
Hamsa (pictured)	Brahma Brahmani, Saraswati, Gayatri, Vishvakarma	
Makara	Ganga (pictured), Varuna, Akhilandeshwari, Khodiyar; Kaveri; Tapati; Various river goddesses	
Tiger	Chandraghanta, Kushmanda, Durga, Rahu, Ayyappan (pictured)	
Lion	Skandamata, Katyayani, Parvati (pictured), Budha, Chandika, Mariamman, Kamakhya, Narasimhi, Kaushiki, Avad mata, Jagaddhatri, Durga, Vaishno Devi	
Elephant	Indra (pictured), Lakshmi, Shachi, Brihaspati	
Parrot	Meenakshi, Kama (pictured), Rati	
Antelope	Chandra, Vayu (pictured)	
Water buffalo	Yama (pictured), Varahi, Dhandai Devi; Chamunda	
Cat	Shashthi (pictured)	
Donkey	Kalaratri, Shitala (pictured), Kali, Alakshmi	
Owl	Lakshmi (pictured); Chamunda; Kāla	
Vulture	Ketu (pictured), Shani; Alakshmi; Nirṛti	
Crow	Shani, Dhumavati (pictured); Jyestha	
Tortoise	Yamuna (pictured)	
Cockerel	Bahuchara Mata (pictured)	
Cow	Dattatreya (pictured), Shailaputri, Mahagauri, Bhumi; Umiya Maa; Gatrad maa	
Snake	Manasa (pictured) naagbai mata Nageswari mata	
Corpse (Betāl)	Chamunda (pictured), Smashana Kali	
Mongoose	Kubera (pictured); Bhadra	
Man	Nirrti (pictured), Kubera, Bhadrā Devi	
Duck	Manasa (pictured)	
Ilish	Jhulelal	
Camel	Hanuman, Momai	
Jackal	Shivaduti, Kali	
Dhole	Chamunda	
Goat	Meldi Mata and Gel maa	
Gaur	Paplaj Mata; Verai Maa	

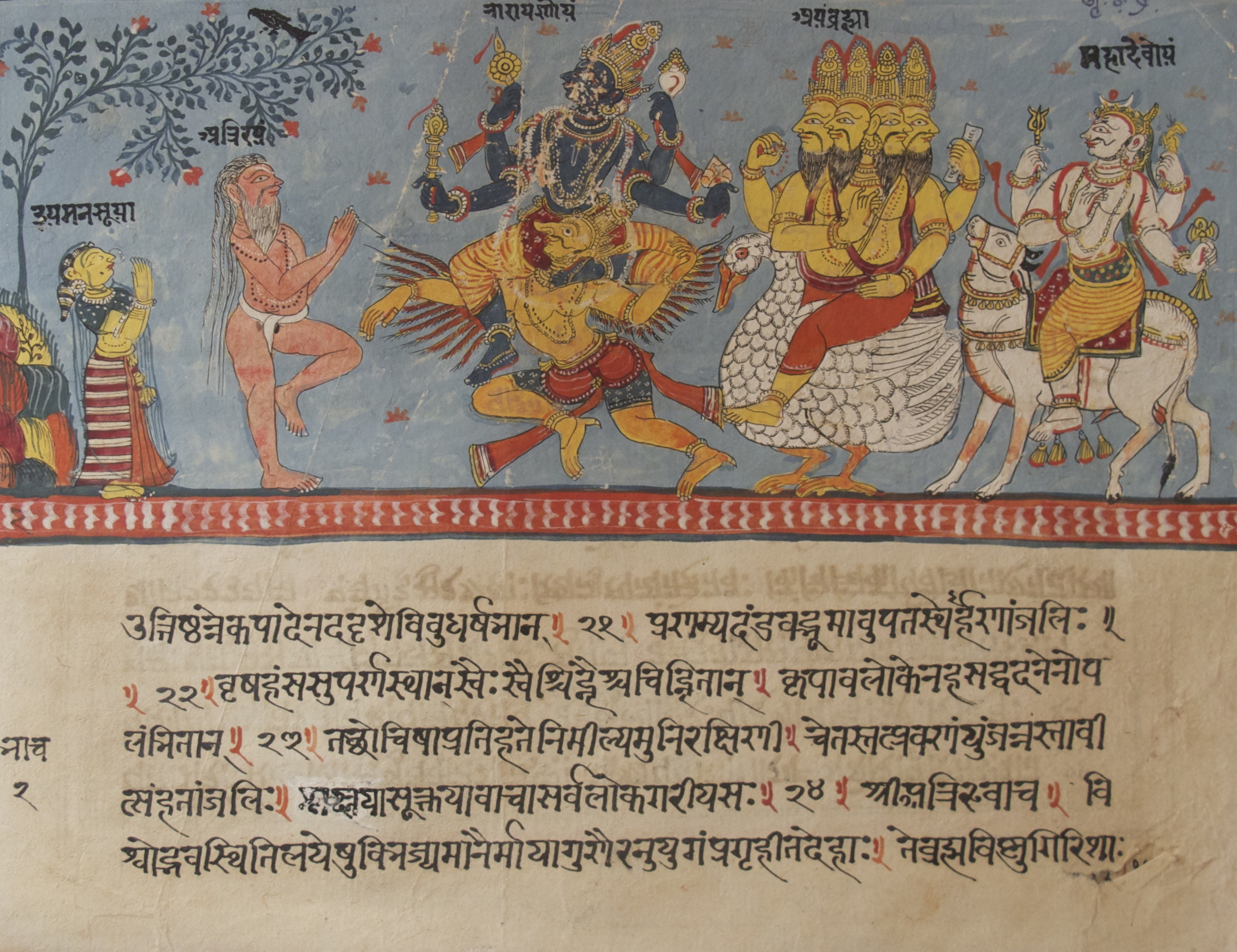
A Bhagavata Purana manuscript page depicting the story of Atri and Anasuya meeting the Trimurti riding on their respective vahanas. (PhP 4.1.21-25). (Paper, late 18th century, Jaipur)

These iconographic associations are not always uniform. For example, Ganesha is sometimes depicted riding a peacock. Less frequently, Ganesha appears mounted on an elephant, or a lion, or a multi-headed serpent (see Ganesha's Vahanas).

The vahana symbolically doubles as a deity's power. The vahana also represents the devotee's mind, which the deity controls and guides. Goddess Durga defeated the demon Mahishasura without the help of her vahana, lion given to her by her father Himalaya. Lakshmi, the goddess of fortune, dispenses material and spiritual wealth from her mount, the owl Uluka. Ganesha, the remover of obstacles, cannot enter every space despite his strength. However, his mount—the mouse Mushika or rat Akhuketana—can crawl into small crevices and survive in harsh environments, enabling Ganesha to overcome the greatest of obstacles.

== See also ==
- Hindu deities
- Hindu iconography
- Hindu mythology
- List of Hindu deities
