= Ganga Dussehra =

Hindu festival

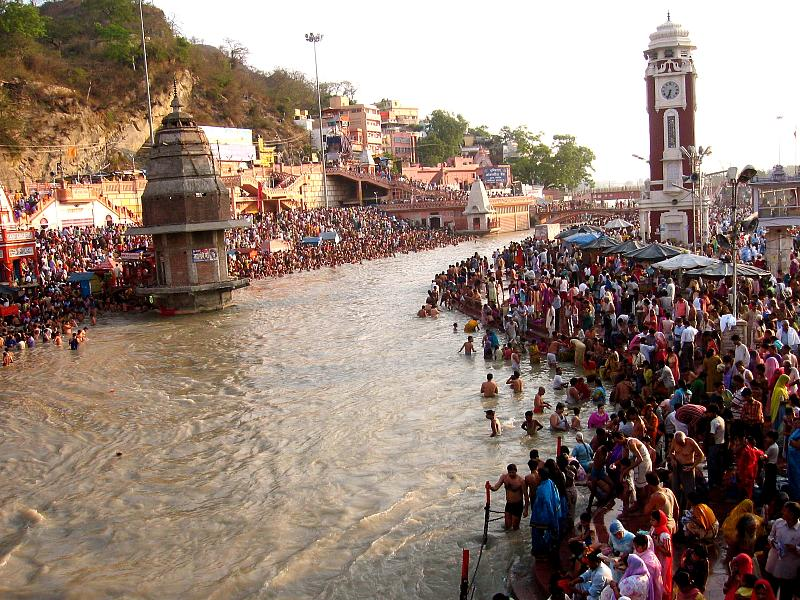
- Ganga Dussehra at Har Ki Pauri, Haridwar in 2005
- Observed by: Hindus
- Type: Hindu festival
- Significance: Commemorate the divine descent of Ganga from the heaven
- Observances: Worship of Goddess Ganga and Bathing in Ganges river
- Date: Dashami (10th day) Jyeshtha month (Hindu calendar)
- Frequency: Annual

Ganga Dussehra, also known as Gangavataran, is a Hindu festival celebrating the avatarana (descent) of the Ganges. It is believed by Hindus that the holy river Ganges descended from heaven to earth on this day. Ganga Dussehra takes place on Dashami (10th day) of the waxing moon (Shukla Paksha) of the Hindu calendar month Jyeshtha. The festival celebration lasts ten days, including the nine days preceding this holy day.

== Celebration ==
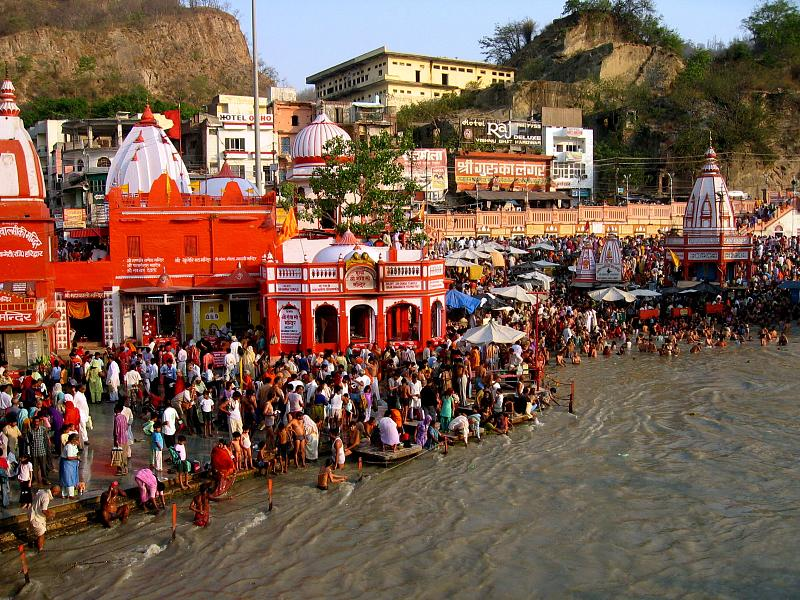
Ganga Dussehra at Haridwar in 2005

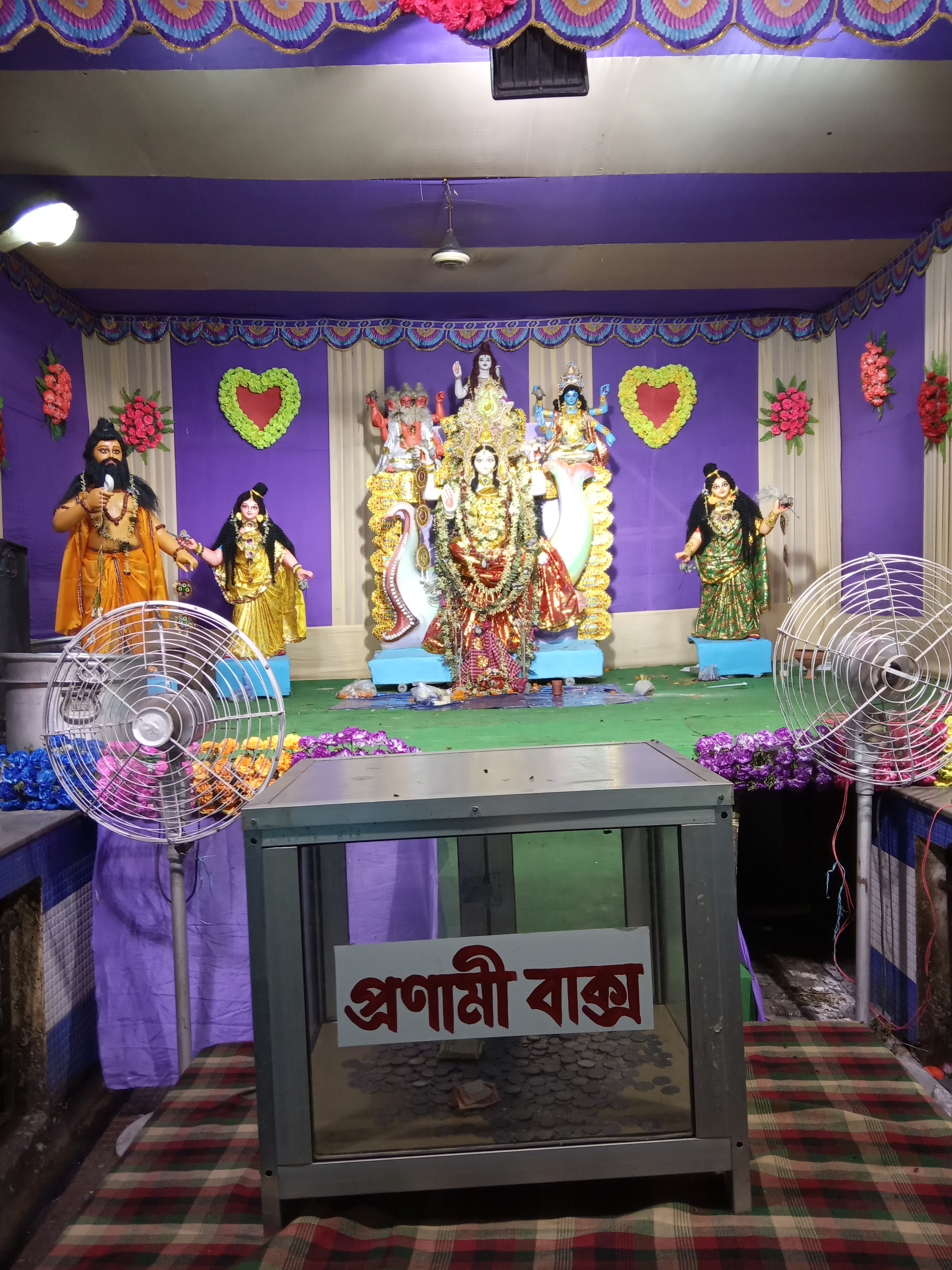
Idol of Goddess Ganga worshipped in Kolkata during Ganga Dusherra

Ganga Dussehra is observed by Hindus mainly in the states of Uttar Pradesh, Uttarakhand, Bihar, and West Bengal, where the river flows. Haridwar, Varanasi, Garhmukteshwar, Rishikesh, Allahabad, and Patna are the main locations of the celebrations, where devotees gather at the banks of the Ganges and perform aartis (a religious ritual in which a light lamp is moved clockwise circularly in front of a deity as a part of prayer) to the river. Taking a dip in the river on this day is believed to bring the devotee to a state of purification and also heal any physical ailments he may have. In Sanskrit, dasha means ten and hara means destroy; thus bathing in the river during these ten days is believed to rid the person of ten sins or, alternatively, ten lifetimes of sins.

On the same day, the river Yamuna is also worshipped and kite-flying events are organized. Devotees take a holy dip in the Yamuna at places like Mathura, Vrindavan, and Bateshwar, and give offerings of watermelon and cucumber. They distribute drinks such as lassi, sharbat and shikanji.

In 2017, an estimated 15 lakh people celebrated the festival in Haridwar. At the Dashashwamedh Ghat in Varanasi, several rituals such as deep daan (offering of floating diyas to the river) and maha aarti are conducted. In Patna, a grand aarti is performed in the evening by priests at Gandhi Ghat and an 1100m garland is offered to the river at Adalat Ghat.

== See also ==
- Ganga puja
