= Meldi Mata =

Hindu goddess

Meldi Mata is a Hindu goddess and household deity who protects farmland. A legend says that she can grant any wish. She is mainly famous in the western state of Gujarat. She is a revered goddess for gujrati farming Hindus and people of Chunvalia Koli. Her vahana is a goat. She has eight hands which hold a variety of weapons.

== Iconography ==
Goddesses worshipped in Gujarat are often distinguished by their animal mounts. Bahuchar Mata is associated with a rooster, Khodiyar Mata with a crocodile, and Meldi Mata with a goat. One origin narrative connects Meldi Mata to the goddess Parvati. Parvati gives her the goat as her mount and also grants her powers. Meldi Mata is represented in Gujarati devotional images in the Mata ni Pachedi textile tradition.

In popular lithographs, she is depicted with multiple arms holding different weapons such as a trident, sword, discus, and mace.

== Protective and tantric associations ==
Meldi Mata has been associated with protection from spirits and other forms of danger. Modern devotional materials present her mantras (sacred chants) and yantras (ritual diagrams) as sources of protective and practical power. Meldi Mata is described as capable of granting fertility, pacifying enemies, warding off spirits, and providing other worldly benefits.

== Worship ==
Worship of Meldi Mata varies among temples and communities. Common practices include arti, the singing and performing of bhajans and garbas, offerings of prasad, and different forms of a havana. As part of her worship through devotional music, the use of Meldi folk songs and bhajans at temples is prevalent.

At the Jasalpur temple, annual celebrations include garba singing and dancing. The celebrations also include a "garbo" procession in which women carry earthen pots containing lamps to the goddess's shrine.

Devotees visit Meldi Mata temples with requests concerning fertility, prosperity, migration, and other practical concerns. When their wishes are fulfilled, devotees may return with offerings or undertake pilgrimages.

== Sources ==
- Dinnell, Darry (2019). Upwardly mobile Mātās: The transformation of Village Goddesses in Gujarat, India (Thesis). McGill University. doi:10.82308/32734.
- Fischer, Eberhard (2014). Temple Tents for Goddesses in Gujarat, India. Niyogi Books. ISBN 9383098155.
