= Jahnu =

Hermit-king in Hinduism

Genealogy
- Parents: Ajamīḍha (father), Suhotra (Some Purāṇa), Keśinī (mother)
- Spouse: Kaveri
- Children: Balākāśva, Sunandā, Ajaka
- Dynasty: Chandravamsha

Jahnu (Sanskrit: जह्नु) is a hermit-king in Hinduism, belonging to the Chandravamsha dynasty. The son of King Ajamīḍha, Jahnu abdicates his kingdom in favour of his son, Balākāśva, or sometimes Ajaka, and retires to perform a penance. According to the Harivamsa and Brahma Purana, he is also the husband of Kāveri.

== Legend ==
=== Curse on Ganga ===
Jahnu's curse on the goddess Ganga is described in the Brahma Purana:

The valorous Jahnu was born of Keśinī and Ajamīḍha. He performed a sacrifice of long duration called Sarva Medhāmakha. Eager to have him as her husband Gaṅgā approached him like a humble lady. As he declined the proposal Gaṅgā flooded his sacrificial hall. O brahmins, on seeing the sacrificial chamber thus flooded all round king Jahnu became infuriated. He said to Gaṅgā—O Gaṅgā, ere long, reap the fruits of this arrogance of thine. I shall condense your water flourishing in the three worlds and drink it up.

— Brahma Purana, Chapter 11

=== Descent of Ganga ===
As prophesied, Jahnu appears in the legend of Ganga and Bhagiratha. When the goddess Ganga descended upon the earth after being released from Shiva's locks, her torrential waters wreaked havoc upon Jahnu's fields and penance. Angered by this, the great sage drank up all the Ganges' waters to punish her. Seeing this, the devas prayed to the sage to release Ganga, so that she could proceed on her mission to release the souls of the ancestors of Bhagiratha. Jahnu relented, and he released the Ganges from his ear. For this, the Ganges river is also known as Jahnavi, meaning "daughter of Jahnu".
