= Ganga puja =

Religious festival in Tripura, India

Ganga Puja
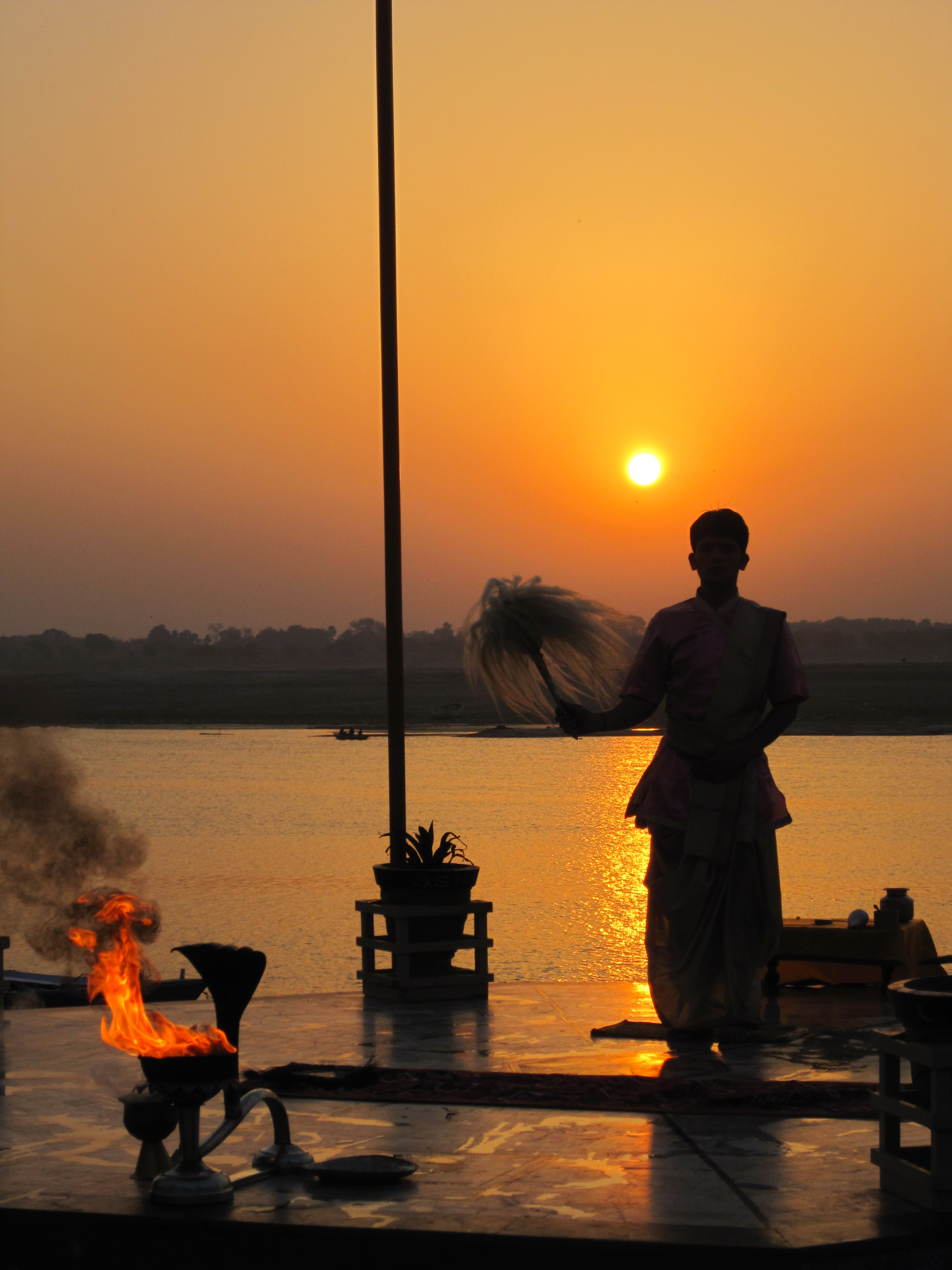
- Morning Aarti of the Ganges at sunrise, Varanasi
- Observed by: Tripuri people
- Celebrations: Worshipping the river/stream
- Date: In March/April/May (Decided by the Hindu Lunisolar calendar)

Ganga puja is a religious festival of the northeastern state of Tripura in India. The tribal Tripuri people worship the Goddess of the river, and pray to be saved from epidemic diseases and for the well-being of pregnant women. The celebration involves building a temple of bamboo in the middle of the river or a stream. The River Ganges, known locally as Ganga, is one of the fourteen prime deities worshipped in this region. The festival is popularly celebrated throughout the state. The festival is popularly celebrated throughout the state somewhere in March, April, or May, with its date fixed according to the Hindu Lunisolar calendar.

== Custom ==
Ganga puja is celebrated after the Navanna festival, which marks the rice harvest. Its date is variable, but it falls in March or April. It worships the river goddess of the Ganga, or Ganges, one of the fourteen foremost deities of Tripura. On this occasion, tribal communities assemble on the banks of a stream or river and "pare three pieces of bamboo into beautiful flowers". After this they build a temporary temple in the middle of the stream, also made out of bamboo, and hold celebrations reverently. Adult male geese, goats, and even buffalo are sacrificed to the gods, in the belief that through such offerings the gods may use their power to prevent epidemic diseases. Another purpose of the festival is that the gods are reverently asked to ensure the well-being of pregnant women. Throughout the state of Tripura, traditional dance forms part of the festival of worship.

== Related events ==
To pay for the festival, financial contributions were levied on the people of the tribes by the priests and those in authority under the hereditary ruler of the state of Tripura. In 1943, these charges were raised from ₹ 2 to ₹ 4 (Indian rupees), leading to widespread protests against this increase by the tribespeople, but their objections were quelled.

Following the independence and partition of what had been British India in August 1947, the acting ruler of the State of Tripura, the regent Kanchan Prava Devi, did not accede to the new Union of India, and this began an organized movement in the state called the Mukti Parishad, the aim of which was to end the rule of the Maharajahs of Tripura and establish democracy instead. In 1948, the leader of this movement, Desharrath Debbarma, used the occasion of the Ganga puja to raise funds by charging ₹ 1 from each family for the Mukti Parishad. However, the activities of his movement were put down, it became less and less active, and in 1950 it finally merged with the Communist Party. In the meantime, Tripura had acceded to the new India in October 1949.
