= Dhandai Devi =

Hindu Temple

Adi Shakti Dhandai Devi (Mahalakshmi)
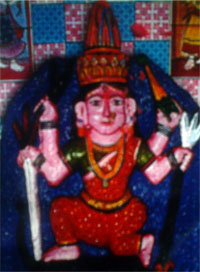
- Idol of Dhandai Devi.
- Sanskrit transliteration: śrī dhanadā'ī mātā
- Devanagari: श्री धनदाई माता
- Mount: Mahishasura (a buffalo demon)

Adi Shakti Dhandai Devi (Mahalakshmi) Mandir is a Hindu temple at Mhasdi near Sakri Taluka in Maharashtra, India.
