= Nirṛti =

Hindu deity

Nirṛti (Sanskrit: निर्ऋति, romanized: Nirṛti) sometimes spelled Nirruti or Nirriti, is a Hindu deity, personifying death, decay, and sorrow. In early Hindu scriptures, Nirṛti is a goddess who lives in the kingdom of the dead. In later Hinduism, Nirṛti and Nirṛta is also a male god, who is regarded as a dikpala ("guardian of the directions") of the southwest.

== Etymology ==
The Sanskrit word Nirṛti means 'decay' and is derived from nirṛ (lit. 'to separate'). It can be interpreted as meaning "devoid of ṛta/i", a state of disorder or chaos.

The name nirṛti has the meaning of "absence of ṛta", meaning 'disorder', or 'lawlessness', specifically the guardian to the absence of divine or cosmic disorder.

This term was used in Vedic texts to indicate a realm of non-existence and absolute darkness, which threatened to consume those who failed in their duties to sacrifice and procreate. In nirṛti, there was no light, no food, and no children: none of the necessary elements of Vedic life and ritual.

== Vedic goddess ==
Nirṛti is mentioned in the hymns of the Rigveda, mostly to seek protection from her or imploring for her during a possible departure. In one hymn (X.59), she is mentioned several times. This hymn, after summing up her nature, also asks for her departure from the sacrificial site. In the Atharvaveda (V.7.9), she is described as having golden locks. In the Taittiriya Brahmana (I.6.1.4), Nirṛtī is described as dark, dressed in dark clothes and her sacrificial shares are dark husks. In the sacred Shatapatha Brahmana (X.1.2.9), she is associated with the southwest quarter as her region. But elsewhere in the same text (V.2.3.3.) she is mentioned as living in the kingdom of the dead.

== Puranic god—Dikpala ==
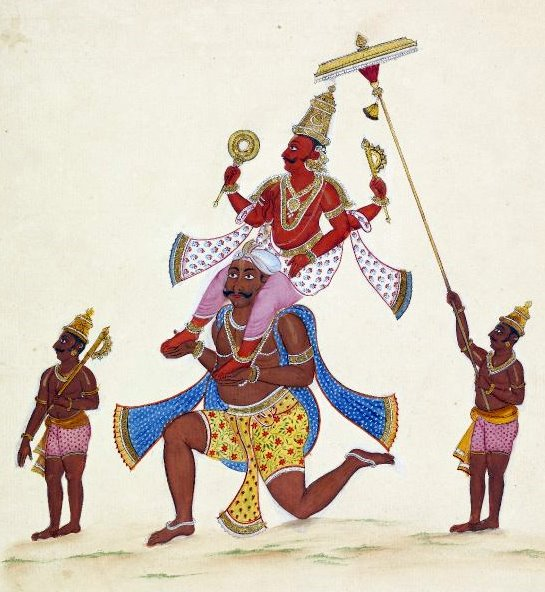
A painting of Nirṛta riding a man and accompanied by servants, c. 1820.

According to some scholars and authors, the goddess Nirṛti transformed into a male in later Hindu mythology and became a dikpala. Nirṛti is regarded as the guardian of the southwest direction.

Nirṛti is sometimes included as one of the rudras and described as the son of Sthanu. Varying descriptions of the god Nirṛti are found in different scriptures. According to the Agamas, Nirrti is dark-skinned with a large body and draped in yellow garments. His vahana is either a man or a lion. The Vishnudharmottara Purana states that Nirṛti has a terrific appearance with ill-looking eyes, gaping mouth, and exposed teeth. The same scripture also gives a varying account that Nirṛti's vahana is a donkey and he holds a danda (a large staff) in his hands. The Vishnudharmottara Purana also mentions that Nirṛti has four consorts named Devi, Krishnangi, Krishavandana and Krishnapasha. According to the scripture Devi-Bhagavata Purana, Nirṛti resides in a city named Krishnajana, which is located in the southwestern part of Mount Meru. The city is said to have an area of 2500 yojanas.

== Puranic goddess ==
In later Hindu texts, Nirṛti was also re-conceptualized as a goddess. According to some texts, she is the wife of Adharma (not-dharma) that signifies an important component of Prakriti for the Purusha who dwell in forests and the mother of three rakshasas—Mrityu (death), Bhaya (fear) and Mahabhaya (terror)—who were collectively referred to as Nairrita. Other texts portray her as the daughter of Adharma and Himsa (violence, the opposite of Ahimsa); she married her brother—Arita (not ṛta) and became the mother of Naraka (personification of the hell) and Bhaya. In the Bhagavata Purana, she is presented as Aprajaḥ (one without children) who takes Adharma and Mṛṣā (untruth), two of Brahma's sons or creations, as adopted sons. Some texts identify Nirṛti with other inauspicious goddess, Jyeshtha or Alakshmi. In this context, she is described to have emerged from the Samudra Manthana (the churning of the ocean).

== Sources ==
- Dallapiccola, Anna L. (December 2002). Dictionary of Hindu Lore and Legend. New York, NY: Thames & Hudson. ISBN 0-500-51088-1.
