= Alakshmi =

Hindu goddess of misfortune

- Goddess of Misfortune and Grief
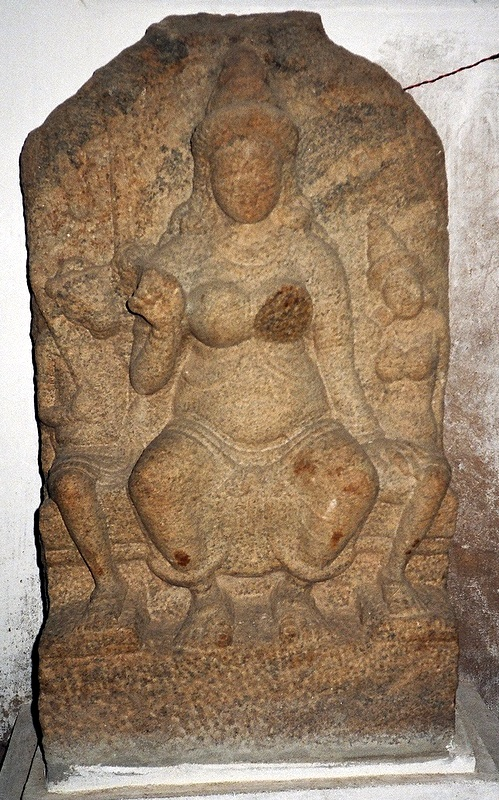
- Goddess Alakshmi or Jyeshtha at Kailash Temple, Kanchipuram
- Other names: Jyestha, Nirṛti
- Devanagari: देवी अलक्ष्मी
- Mantra: Alakshmi nashana mantra (Mantra for destroying Alakshmi)
- Mount: Crow, Donkey
- Texts: Linga Purana Śrī Sūkta (Rigveda) Padma Purana

Genealogy
- Siblings: Lakshmi
- Spouse: Kali (asura), Rishi Uddalaka (according to Padma Purana)

Alakshmi (Devanāgari: अलक्ष्मी; from the roots अ (a): "not" and लक्ष्मी (Lakshmi): "goddess of fortune", figurative meaning "goddess of misfortune") meaning "not Lakshmi" or "anti-Lakshmi". She is described as being "cow-repelling, antelope-footed, and bull-toothed." Or she "has dry shriveled up body, sunken cheeks, thick lips, and beady eyes and that she rides a donkey." Alakshmi is also known as Kalahapriya and Daridara, Jyestha and the shadow opposite of Lakshmi.

She is not mentioned by name in the Vedic, Upanishadic or early Puranic literature, but all aspects of Alakshmi match those of the Rig Vedic goddess Nirṛti. She is also said to be the shadow of Lakshmi. In Padma Purana, the cosmology includes her where the Samudra Manthana creates both good and bad of everything that emerges. That which is inauspicious and bad emerges first, more effort creates the auspicious and good, according to Padma Purana.

A hymn describing Alakshmi is as follows:

amangaḷā pradhā jyēṣṭhā krṣṇa varṇā kurūpiṇī |
darda dāmpāhinī dēvī sakala duḳha dāyinī

— Unknown, Verse 1

Jyestha, the woman who provides inauspiciousness, having the blackest complexion and the blackest of clothes, The granter of pain and suffering, the one who gives sorrow to the world.

First Alakshmi emerges, then Lakshmi appears during the Samudra Manthana. Gods send Alakshmi to go dwell amongst pernicious persons, give them poverty and grief. She as the Asura of inauspiciousness and grief is the opposite of Lakshmi who is the "Devi" of auspiciousness and joy.

According to Chakrabarty, “It was said that when she entered a household, Alakshmi brought jealousy and malice in her trail. Brothers fell out with each other, families and their male lineages (kula) faced ruin and destruction."

It is believed that Alakshmi can be warded off by chanting the Alakshmi Nashana Mantra which seeks to banish and destroy Alakshmi and her effects, while at the same time, praising and inviting her good-minded sister Lakshmi. In Hindu households, especially in northern India, hanging a lime and seven green chilies at the doorstep of one's house is viewed as a ritual to either ward off or acknowledge Alakshmi. The former version of the belief insists that the sourness of the lime and the pungency of the chilies combined creates a smell that even Alakshmi cannot tolerate. Others believe that Alakshmi, who is pleased with sour and spicy offerings, will receive her share standing at the door, while Lakshmi, her sister who prefers more palatable foods is free to enter the home in the meanwhile.

There are also those who share the belief that even though she brings inauspiciousness, Alakshmi, being a form of the great Mahadevi, exists to goad people into Lakshmi-attracting actions. Here she is viewed as the struggle that exists before attaining success (hence the elder sister metaphor) who descends upon the homes of ill-doers, the irresponsible and the lazy, in the form of misfortune, poverty and grief, in order to remind them to work hard and pave the way for her younger sister, Lakshmi's arrival. She chastises (with her infamous blessings) those who do less than what is expected of them, so as to set them on the right path towards prosperity. In other words, she is looked upon as the sting of poverty and failure, that elevates the pleasure of abundance and success, which follows right conduct.

Worship of Lakshmi during Deepavali by Hindus consist of rituals where Alakshmi is ceremonially banished from the home.

== See also ==
- Kali
