= Ganga (goddess) =

Personification of the river Ganges as a deity in Hinduism

- Personification of the Ganges River; Goddess of Forgiveness and Purification
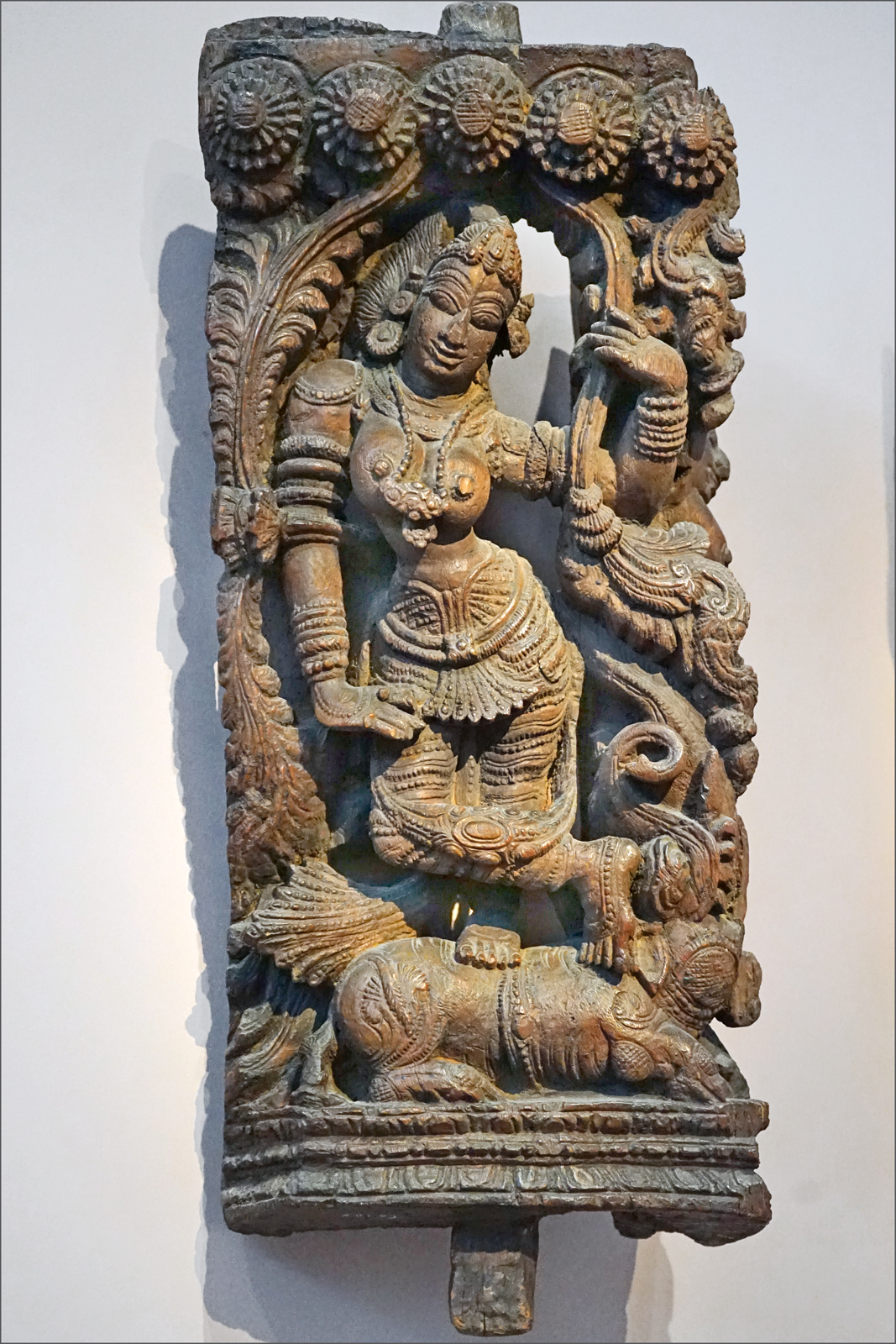
- 17th-18th-century sculpture of goddess Ganga
- Other names: Bhagirathi; Vishnupadi; Simaria; Shivapriya; Jahnavi; Nikita; Mandakini; Padma
- Affiliation: Devi; River goddess; Yogini; Banai
- Mantra: Oṁ Śrī Gaṅgāyai Namaḥ
- Weapon: Kalasha
- Symbol: Ganges River
- Mount: Makara
- Festivals: Ganga Dussehra; Ganga Jayanti; Navaratri; Loy Krathong; Triyampawai ceremony

Genealogy
- Parents: Himavan and Maināvati (in some texts)
- Siblings: Parvati, Mainaka (in some texts)
- Consort: Shantanu (married temporarily); Shiva (in some Puranas)
- Children: Bhishma and 7 other sons of Shantanu

Ganga (Sanskrit: गङ्गा, IAST: Gaṅgā) is the personification of the river Ganges, who is worshipped by Hindus as the goddess of purification and forgiveness. She is often depicted as a fair, beautiful ornate woman, riding a divine crocodile-like creature called the makara.

Ganga's mythology and religious significance developed in post-Vedic era, featured in texts such as the Ramayana, Mahabharata, and the Puranas. In Hindu mythology, Ganga is generally described as originating from the feet of the preserver deity Vishnu. However, according to some scriptures, including the Ramayana, she is the firstborn daughter of Himavat (the personification of the Himalayas) and the elder sister of the goddess Parvati. Originally, Ganga resided in the heavens under the watch of the creator god Brahma. Her most famous story is her descent to Earth, which was granted as a boon to the royal sage Bhagiratha so that she could purify the souls of his ancestors. This descent was facilitated by the god Shiva, who caught Ganga in his matted hair to break her fall and later released her gently onto the earth. In the Mahabharata, Ganga is also portrayed as the mother of the warrior Bhishma through her union with the Kuru king Shantanu.

In Hinduism, Ganga is seen as a mother to humanity. Pilgrims immerse the ashes of their kin in the river Ganga, which is considered by them to bring the souls (purified spirits) closer to moksha, the liberation from the cycle of life and death. Festivals like Ganga Dussehra and Ganga Jayanti are celebrated in her honour at several sacred places, which lie along the banks of the Ganges, including Gangotri, Haridwar, Prayagraj, Varanasi and Kali Ghat in Kolkata. Alongside Gautama Buddha, Ganga is worshipped during the Loy Krathong festival in Thailand.

== Vedic scriptures ==
Ganga is mentioned in the Rigveda, the earliest and theoretically the holiest of the Hindu scriptures. Ganga is mentioned in the Nadistuti (Rigveda 10.75), which lists the rivers from east to west. In RV 6.45.31, the word Ganga is also mentioned, but it is not clear if the reference is to the river. RVRV 3.58.6 says that "your ancient home, your auspicious friendship, O Heroes, your wealth is on the banks of the Jahanvi". This verse could refer to the Ganga. In RV 1.116.18–19, the Jahanvi and the Ganges river dolphin occur in two adjacent verses.

== Iconography ==
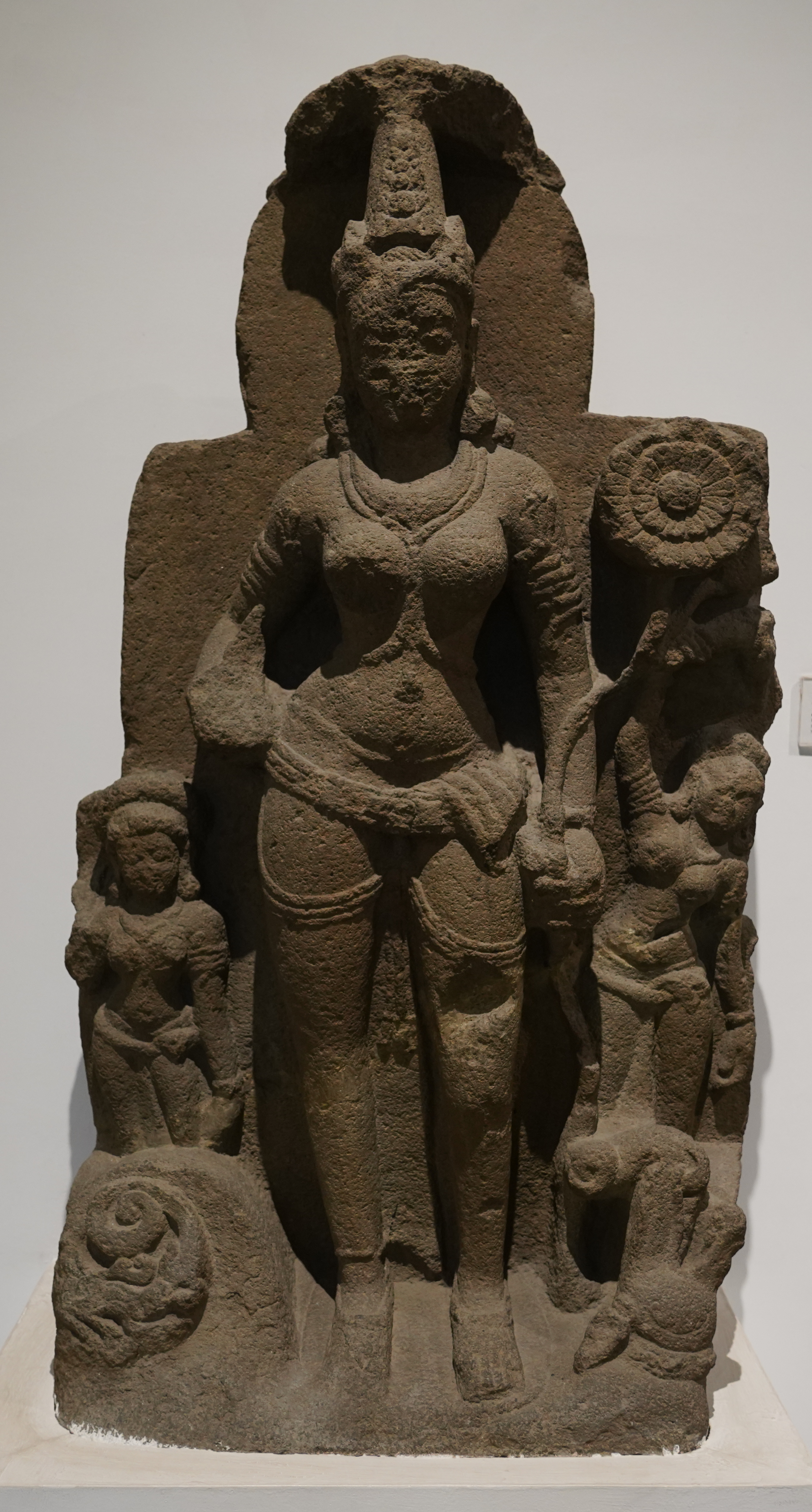
Ganga stone statue, 8th century AD, Ellora. Currently at National Museum, New Delhi, India.

Ganga is described as the melodious, the fortunate, the cow that gives much milk, the eternally pure, the delightful, the body that is full of fish, affords delight to the eye and leaps over mountains in sport, the bedding that bestows water and happiness, and the friend or benefactor of all that lives.

Since the Vedic period, the Ganges river has been considered the holiest of all rivers by Hindus. Ganga is also personified as a goddess and worshipped as Goddess Ganga. She holds an important place in the Hindu pantheon. Ganga is represented as a fair-complexioned woman, wearing a white crown and sitting on a crocodile. She holds a water lily in her right hand and a flute in her left. When shown with four hands she carries a water-pot, a lily, and a rosary, and has one hand in a protective mode. The Rigveda mentions Ganga but more of her is said in the Puranas.

Ganga is depicted four-armed and mounted on a crocodile or enthroned surrounded by crocodiles. In one of the iconography in Maha Virat-rupa, she holds a jar of amrita, rosary, lotus and varada mudra. She may be depicted in other ways holding only a kalasha (or 2 replacing lotus) and lotus, while other 2 hands in varadamudra and abhaya mudra.

Another depiction popular especially in Bengal shows her holding shankha, chakra (discus), lotus and abhaya mudra, with the kalasha releasing her holy water.

In Brahma Vaivarta Purana, Ganga is often depicted with her divine mount, the makara – an animal with the head of a crocodile and tail of a dolphin.

== Legend ==
=== Birth ===
Varying myths of Ganga's birth are found in Hindu scriptures. According to the Bhagavata Purana, Vishnu, in his incarnation as Vamana, extended his left foot to the end of the universe, and pierced a hole in its covering with the nail of his big toe. Through the hole, the pure water of the causal ocean entered this universe as the Ganges river. Having washed the lotus feet of the lord, which are covered with reddish saffron, the water of the Ganga acquired a very beautiful pink colour. Because the Ganges directly touches the lotus feet of Vishnu (Narayana) before descending within this universe, it is known as Bhagavat-Padi or Vishnupadi, which means emanating from the feet of Bhagavan (God). It finally settles in Brahmaloka or Brahmapura, the abode of the Brahma, before descending to the planet earth at the request of Bhagiratha, and held safely by Shiva on his head, to prevent the destruction of Bhumi Devi (the earth goddess). Then, Ganga was released from Shiva's hair to meet the needs of the country.

The Ramayana narrates a different version of the myth. Ganga is described as the eldest child of Himavat, son of Brahma and the king of the Himalayas, and his wife Queen Menavati, the daughter of Meru. Her younger sister is Parvati, who latter marries Shiva. When Ganga attained youth, the devas took her to Svarga, where she took a form of a river and flowed.

=== Transformation into a river ===
A legend in the Devi Bhagavata Purana describes Ganga as originally being one of the three wives of Vishnu, together with Lakshmi and Saraswati. In the midst of a conversation, Saraswati observed Ganga playfully glancing at Vishnu. Frustrated, Saraswati launched a furious tirade against Ganga, accusing her of stealing Vishnu's love away from her. When Ganga appealed to her husband to help her, he chose to remain neutral, not wishing to participate in a quarrel between his three wives, whom he loved equally. When Lakshmi attempted to soothe Saraswati's anger by reasoning with her, the jealous goddess grew angry with her as well, accusing her of disloyalty towards her. She cursed Lakshmi to be born as the Tulasi plant upon the earth. Ganga, now enraged that Lakshmi had been cursed because she had defended her, cursed Saraswati that she would be incarnated as a river on earth. Saraswati issued the same curse against Ganga, informing her that sinful men would cleanse themselves of their sins with her water. To prevent further conflict among the goddesses, Vishnu declares Lakshmi as his only wife and sends Saraswati to Brahma and Ganga to Shiva.

=== Descent upon the earth ===
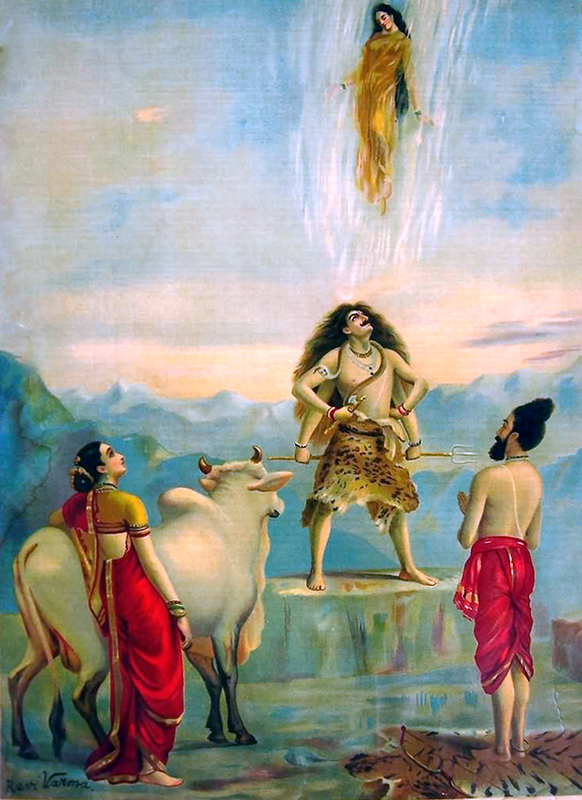
Descent of Ganga, painting by Raja Ravi Varma c. 1910

The Mahabharata narrates that there was once a war between the devas and the asuras. The leader of the asuras, Vritra, was killed by Indra, and so his followers hid in the sea, causing the devas to be unable to find them. The devas requested Sage Agastya to help. He used his divine powers and swallowed the ocean to reveal where the asuras were hiding. The devas defeated the remaining asuras, and asked Sage Agastya to restore the water. However, the sage was unable to release the water, despite trying several times. This caused drought conditions upon the earth, but Vishnu assured that the ocean would be filled by the flow of Ganga on the planet.

The story about Ganga's descent on earth through the efforts of Bhagiratha, a descendant of King Sagara, is narrated in the Ramayana, Mahabharata, and various Puranas. Wanting to show his sovereignty, King Sagara performed a ritual known as ashvamedha, where a horse was left to wander for one year. However, Indra stole the horse to prevent the ritual from being successful. Learning that the horse had disappeared, King Sagara sent his sixty thousand sons to look for it. They eventually found the horse at the ashrama of Sage Kapila, in the netherworld. Thinking that Sage Kapila had stolen the horse, the sons interrupted him while he was in a deep meditation. This infuriated Kapila, and with his ascetic's gaze, he burned all the sixty thousand sons to ashes.

King Sagara sent his grandson, Amshuman, to ask the sage Kapila what could be done to bring deliverance to their souls. Sage Kapila advised that only the water of the Ganges, which flowed from Svarga, could liberate them. Bhagiratha, Amshuman's grandson, undertook severe ascetic practices, and won the favour of Brahma and Shiva. Brahma allowed Ganga to descend on earth, while Shiva broke Ganga's fall in the coils of his hair, so that her force would not shatter the earth. When Ganga descended, Bhagiratha led her to the sea. From there, the river reached the netherworld, and liberated the sixty thousand sons of King Sagara.

Because of Bhagiratha's efforts, the river is also known as Bhagirathi. She is also known as Tripathaga because she flows in the three worlds, heaven, earth, and the netherworld. Another epithet that Ganga is known by is Jahnavi, because she flooded the ashram of Sage Jahnu while being led by Bhagiratha. Her waters extinguished the ritual fire there, which angered the sage Jahnu, so he drank up all of Ganga's waters. Sage Jahnu later released the water out of his left ear after Bhagiratha explained his mission for Ganga's descent. Due to this incident, Ganga is known as Jahnavi, which means daughter of Sage Jahnu.

=== Marriage and children ===
In the Mahabharata, Ganga is the wife of Shantanu as well as the mother of the eight Vasus, including Bhishma. Ganga and Shantanu were cursed by Brahma to be born on earth. Shantanu met Ganga on the banks of the Ganges and asked her to marry him. She accepted the proposal on the condition that Shantanu would not question any of her actions. Shantanu agreed and they married. They lived together peacefully and had eight sons who were the incarnation of the eight Vasus. They too had been cursed and had asked Ganga to end their life when they were born to her on earth. Due to their request, Ganga began drowning each son upon birth while Shantanu watched without questioning. However, when she was about to drown their eighth son, Bhishma, Shantanu stopped her. Ganga later leaves with Bhishma but gives him back to Shantanu when he is ten years old.

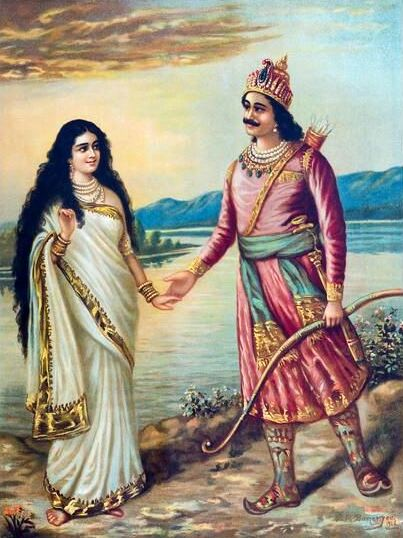
Shantanu meets Ganga and asks for her hand in marriage.

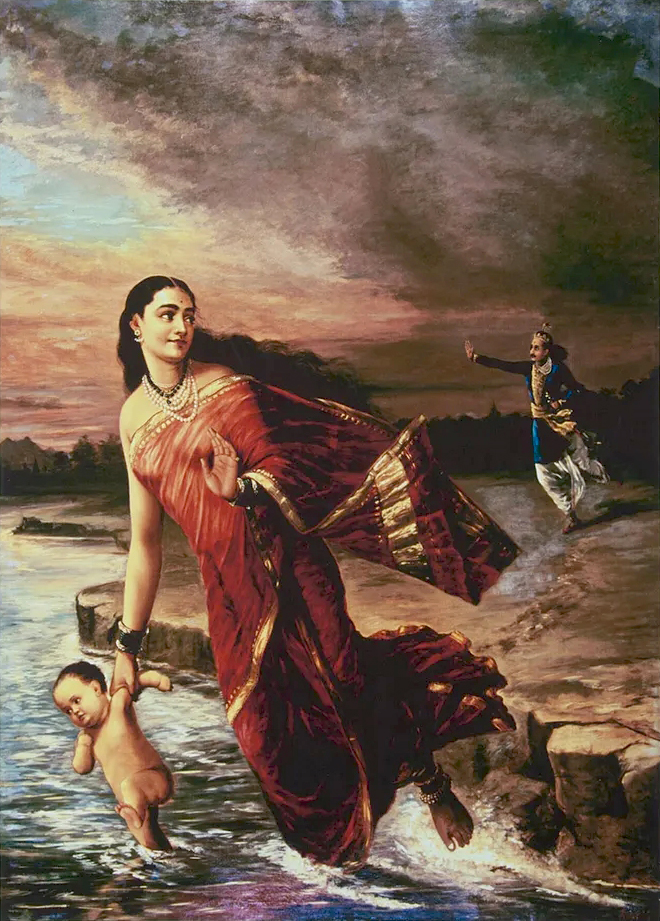
Shantanu trying to stop Ganga from drowning their eighth child

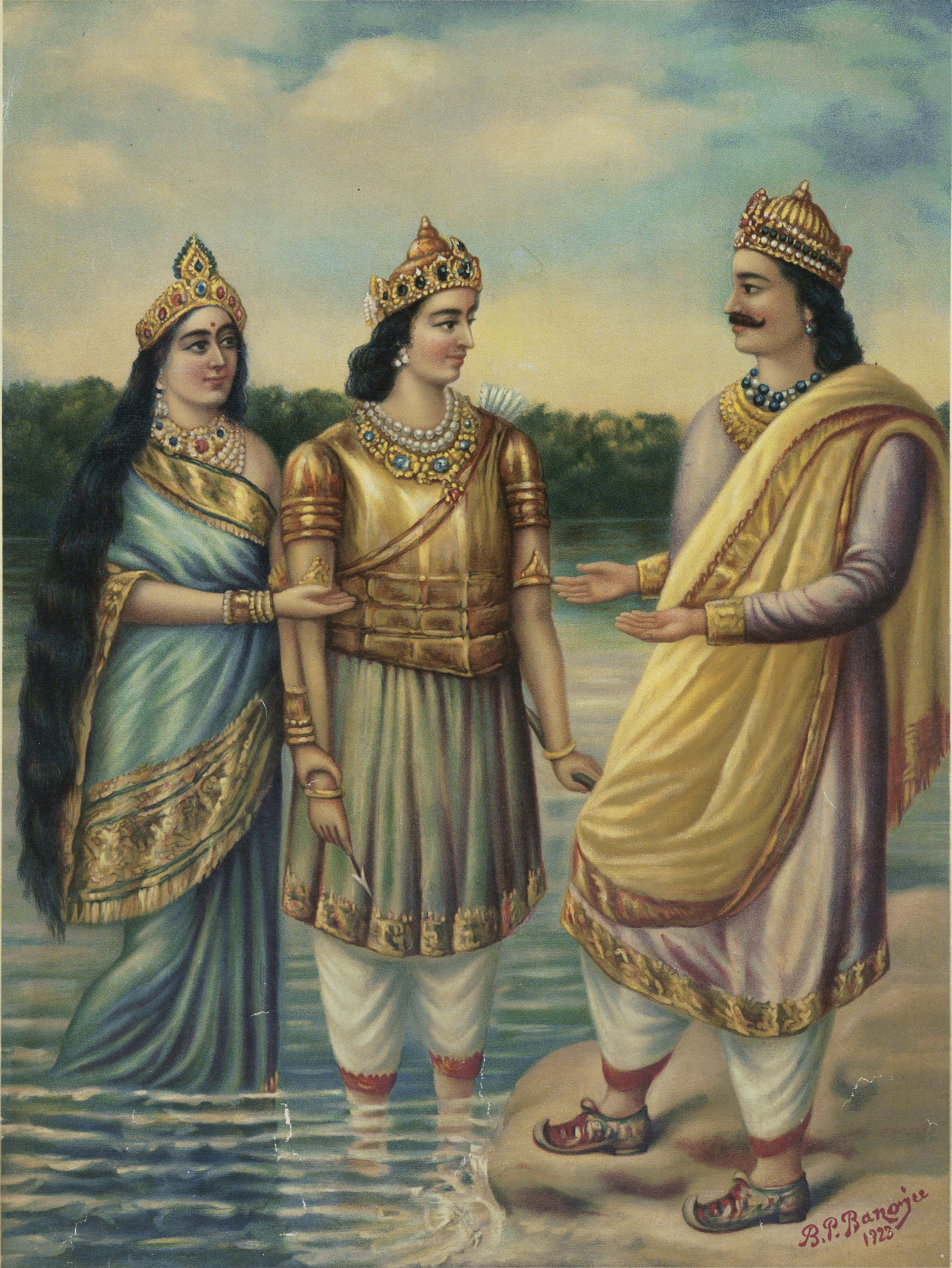
Ganga presenting her son Devavrata (the future Bhishma) to his father, Shantanu

== Significance ==
The Ganga is also called the Ganga Mata (Mother), and is revered in Hindu worship and culture, venerated for her forgiveness of sins and capacity to cleanse mankind. Unlike various other goddesses, she has no destructive or fearsome aspect, destructive though she might be as a river in nature. She is also a mother to other gods.

== Festivals ==
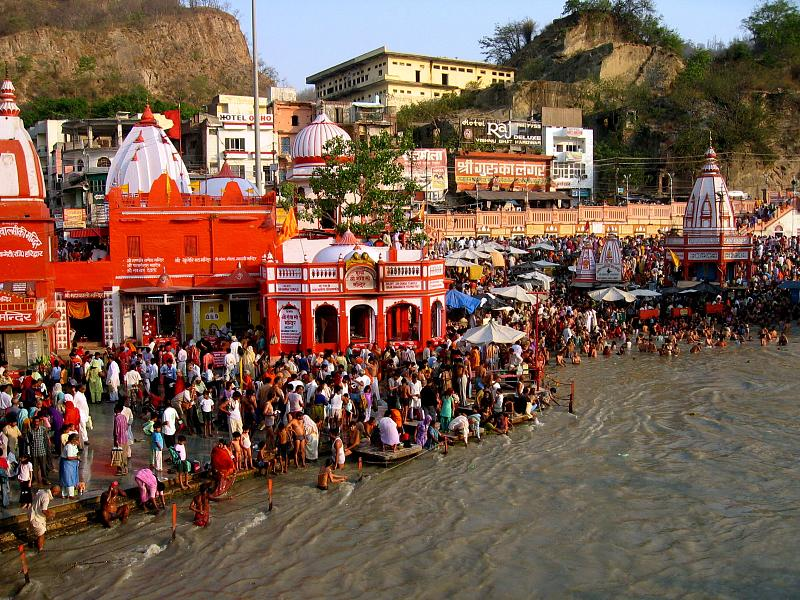
Pilgrims at Haridwar on the occasion of Ganga Dussehra

=== Ganga Jayanti ===
On this day, Ganga is regarded to have been reborn. According to legend, the goddess is regarded to have accidentally destroyed the hut of Sage Jahnu during her descent upon the earth. In retort, the sage drank the entirety of the river's water. At the request of Bhagiratha and Ganga herself, he released the river from his ear, and she earned the epithet Jahnavi. Ganga Jayanti falls on the seventh day of the month of Vaishakha's first fortnight.

=== Navaratri ===
Ganga is worshipped during Navaratri as all the forms of Adishakti during the duration of the festivities.

=== Loy Krathong ===
Thais use the Krathong to thank the Goddess of Water known as Phra Mae Khongkha and who represents the Hindu goddess Ganga.

=== Triyampawai ceremony ===
The worship dedicated to Ganga is of great importance in the Triyampawai ceremony. An image of her in the form of a Nang kradan (นางกระดาน) along with a Phra Mae Thorani, Surya and Chandra are invited at the beginning of the festival for three days which is considered to symbolise the beginning of the Triyampawai festival.

== Beyond the Indian subcontinent and Hinduism ==
Beyond the Indian subcontinent and Hinduism
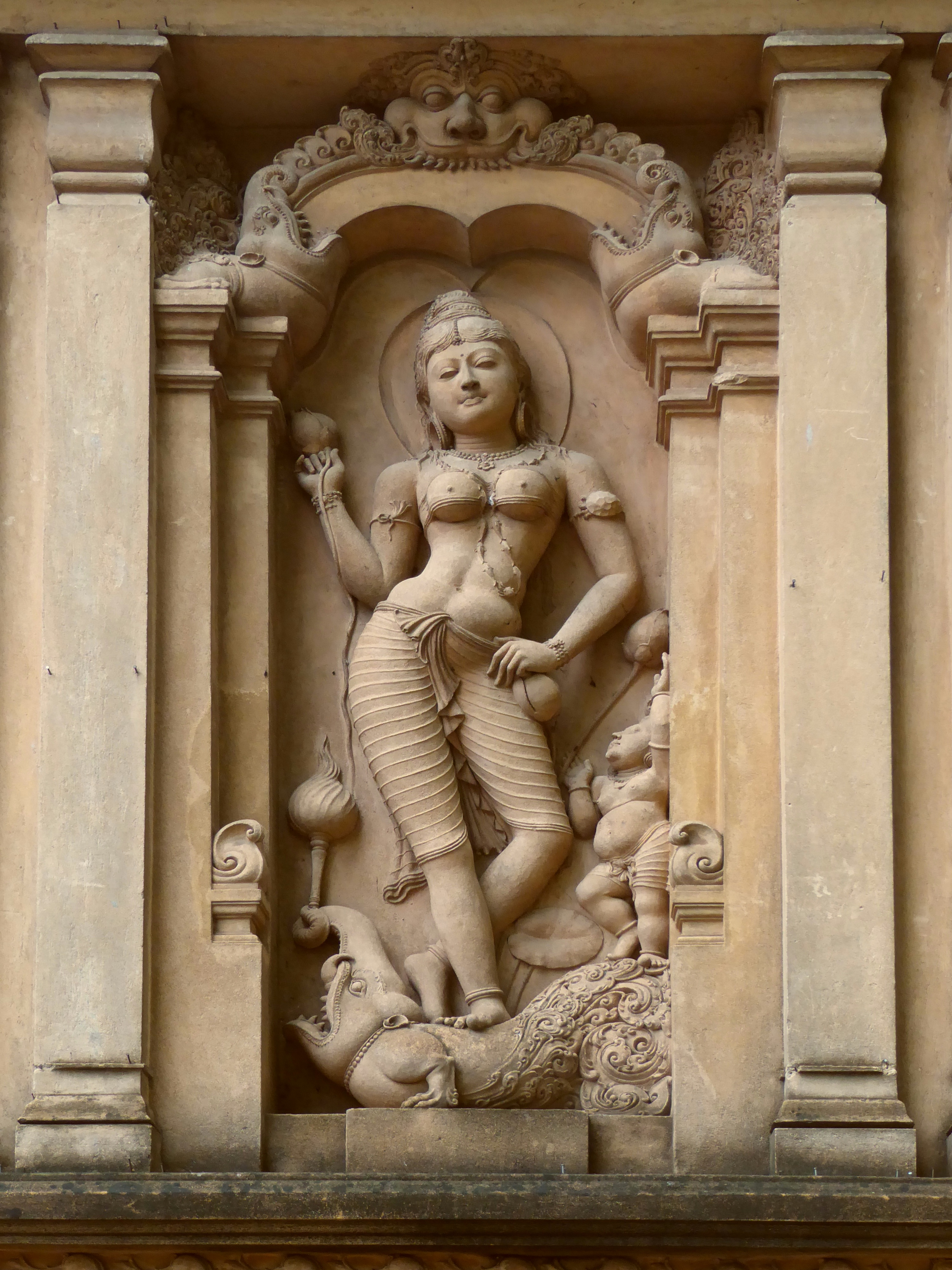
Goddess Ganga, Kelaniya Raja Maha Vihara

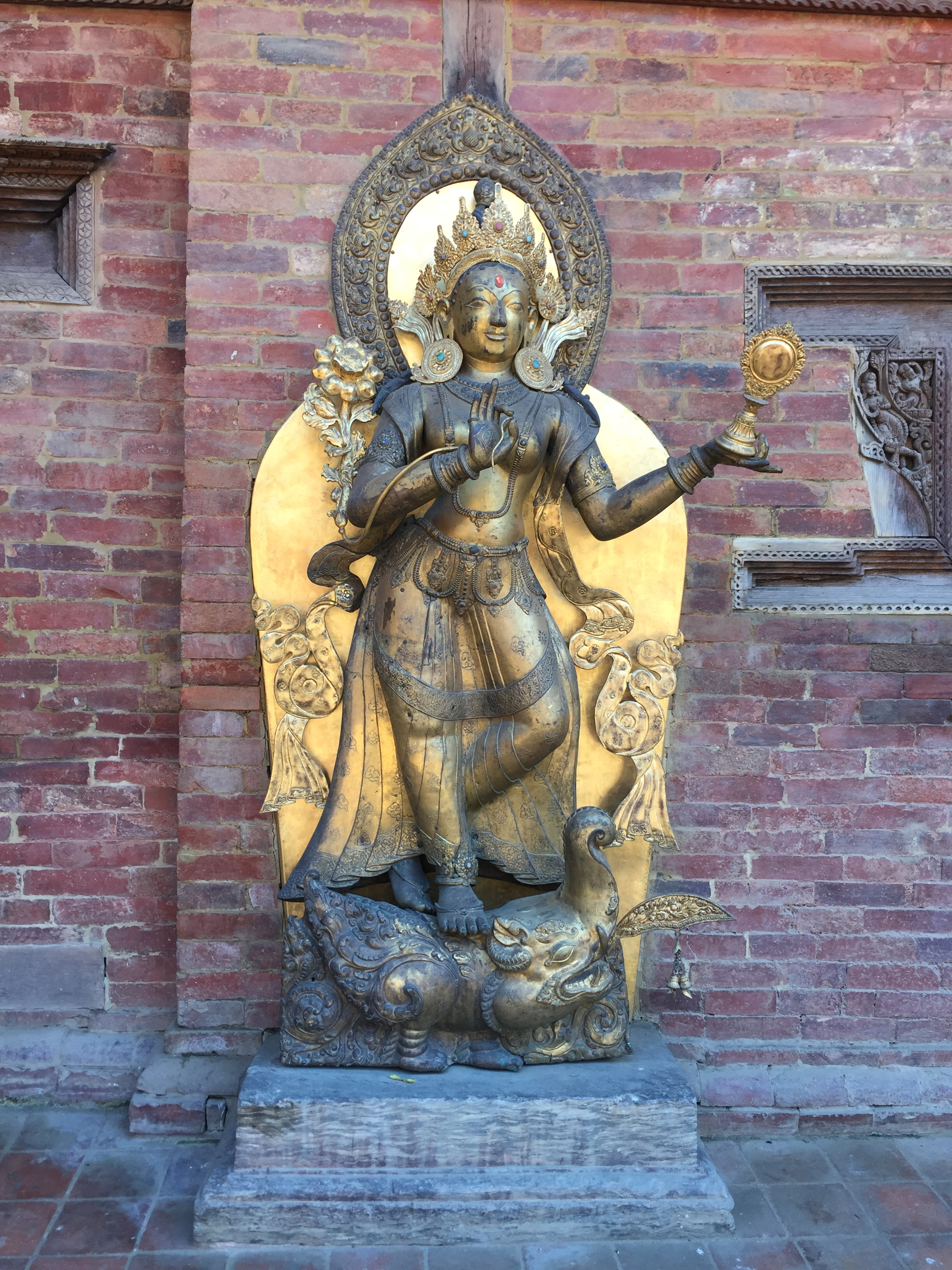
Goddess Ganga, Patan Durbar Square

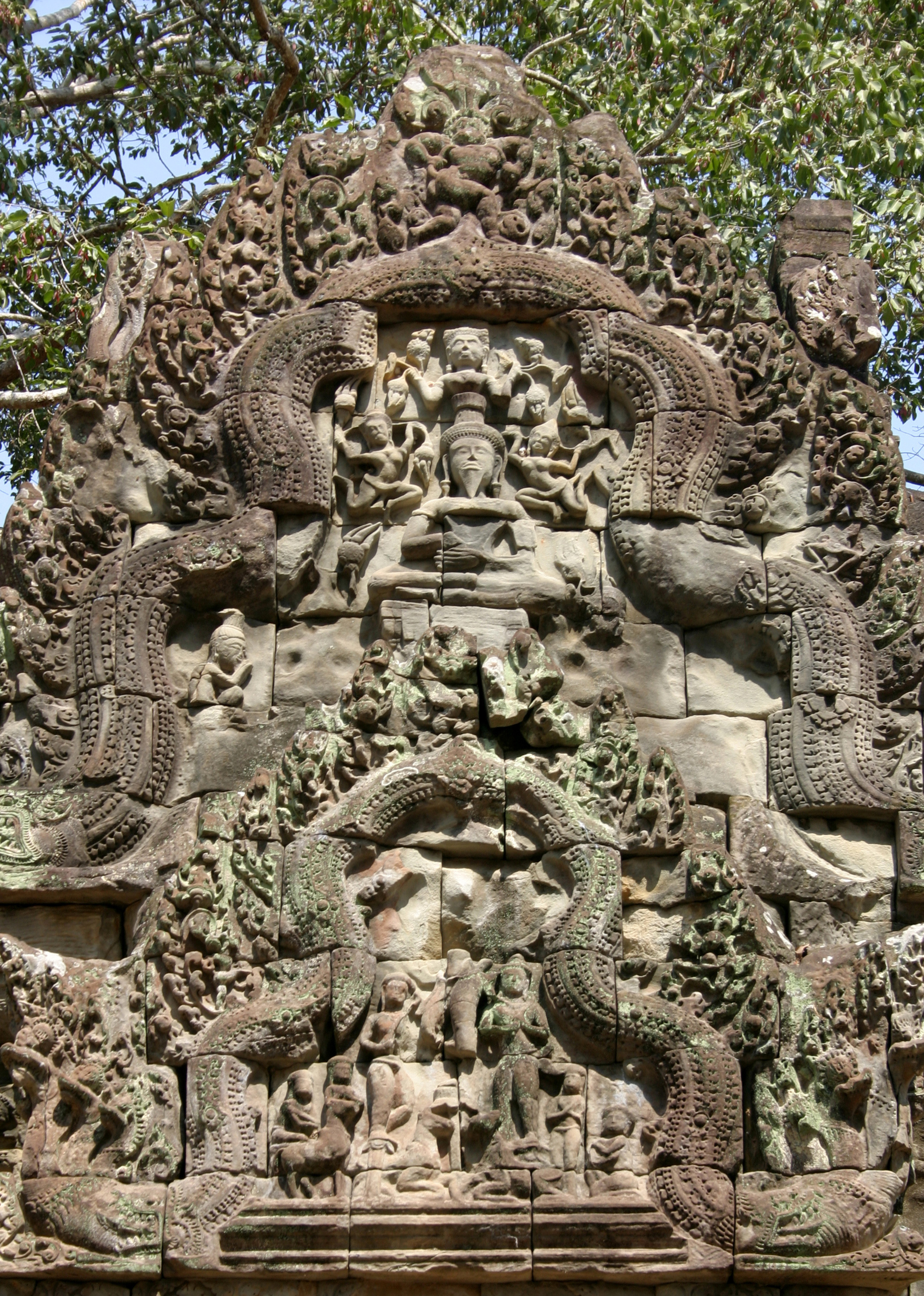
Shiva breaks Ganga's fall in the coils of his hair, lintel in Thommanon.

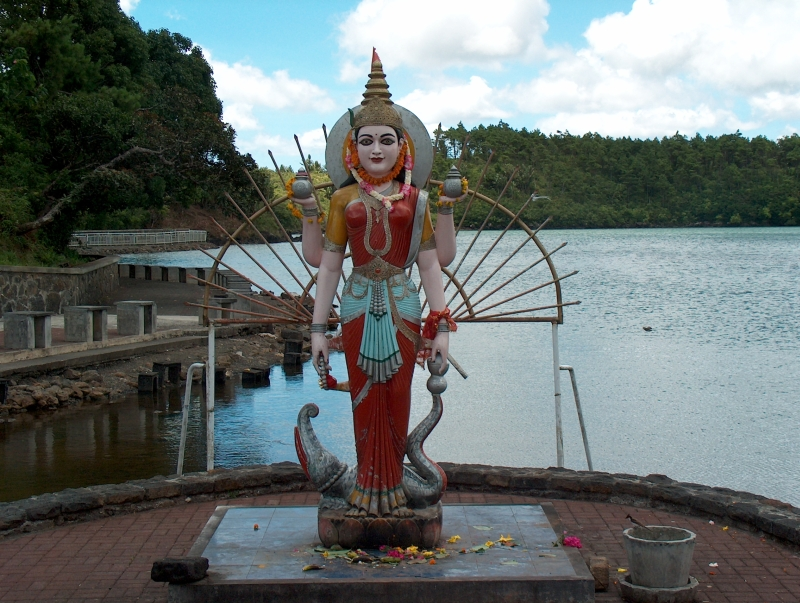
Statue of Goddess Ganga at Ganga Talao in Mauritius

Ganga is respected in Nepal as a guardian water goddess, worshipped together with another river goddess Yamuna. Her sculptures are found in Patan Durbar Square and Gokarneshwar Mahadev temple is a municipality in Kathmandu District in the Bagmati Province.

In Sri Lanka, Ganga with other Hindu deities assumes a Buddhist persona. Her sculpture is seen in Kelaniya Raja Maha Vihara.

In Balinese Hinduism, she is worshipped together with the goddess Danu. Her waters are considered holy in Bali. Her maternal association with Bhishma is known in Bali. Religious sites associated with her in Bali are Tirta Gangga, Pura Taman Mumbul Sangeh, and Kongco Pura Taman Gandasari.

Ganga Talao in Mauritius is considered by the Mauritian Hindus equivalent to Ganga. In 1972, the then Prime Minister of Mauritius, Sir Seewoosagur Ramgoolam brought Holy water from the Ganga's source – Gomukh in India and mixed it with the water of the Grand Bassin and renamed it as Ganga Talao.

Ganga is invoked with Hindu deities Shiva, Bhumi, Surya and Chandra in Thailand's royal Triyampawai ceremony. She is worshipped together with goddess Phra Mae Thorani within Thai Budhhism and goddess Phosop in Tai folk religion. The four sacred pools of Suphan Buri Province have waters from the Ganga and the Yamuna rivers and are used for rituals.

Ganga has been revered in Cambodia since the Khmer empire. In Shiva's iconographical form Uma-Gangapatisvarar (Khmer: ព្រះឧមាគង្គាបតិស្វរ), Shiva is depicted with Ganga and his wife Uma (Parvati). Ganga's images are located in Bakong, Lintel in Thommanon and exhibit in International Council of Museums.

== See also ==
- Bhishma
- Shantanu
- Shiva
- Yami/Yamuna
- Narmada

== Sources ==
- Eck, Diana L. (1982), Banaras, city of light, Columbia University, ISBN 978-0231114479
- Eck, Diana (1998), "Gangā: The Goddess Ganges in Hindu Sacred Geography", in Hawley, John Stratton; Wulff, Donna Marie (eds.), Devī: Goddesses of India, University of California / Motilal Banarasidass, pp. 137–53, ISBN 8120814916
- Vijay Singh: The River Goddess (Moonlight Publishing, London, 1994)
