= Rivers in Hinduism =

Rivers featured in Hinduism

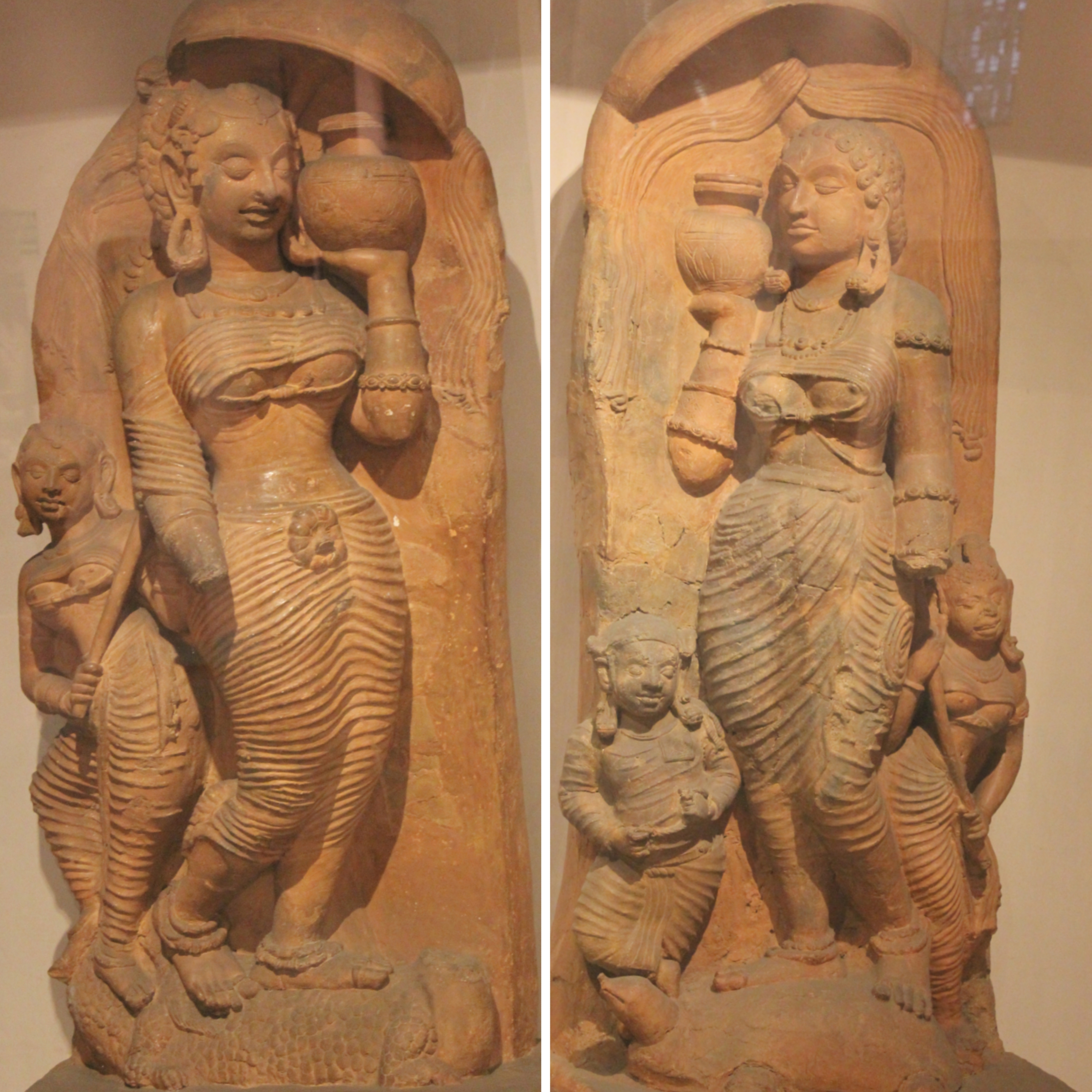
Relief panels depicting the river goddesses Ganga and Yamuna, personifications of the eponymous rivers, accompanied by their attendants, from Ahichchhatra, Gupta period, 5th century CE. Such sculptures were traditionally placed at temple gateways to symbolise ritual purification upon entry.

In Hinduism, rivers are often personified as deities. In the Rigveda, there are mentions of holy rivers such as the Sarasvati. The river Ganges is considered to be most sacred, and is also personified as the goddess Ganga. Most of the rivers are represented in female form, with the notable exception of Brahmaputra, which is considered to be male. The most significant rivers in the faith are the Saptanadi and which includes the Ganges, Yamuna, Sindhu, Narmada, Godavari, Krishna, and Kaveri.

== Deities ==
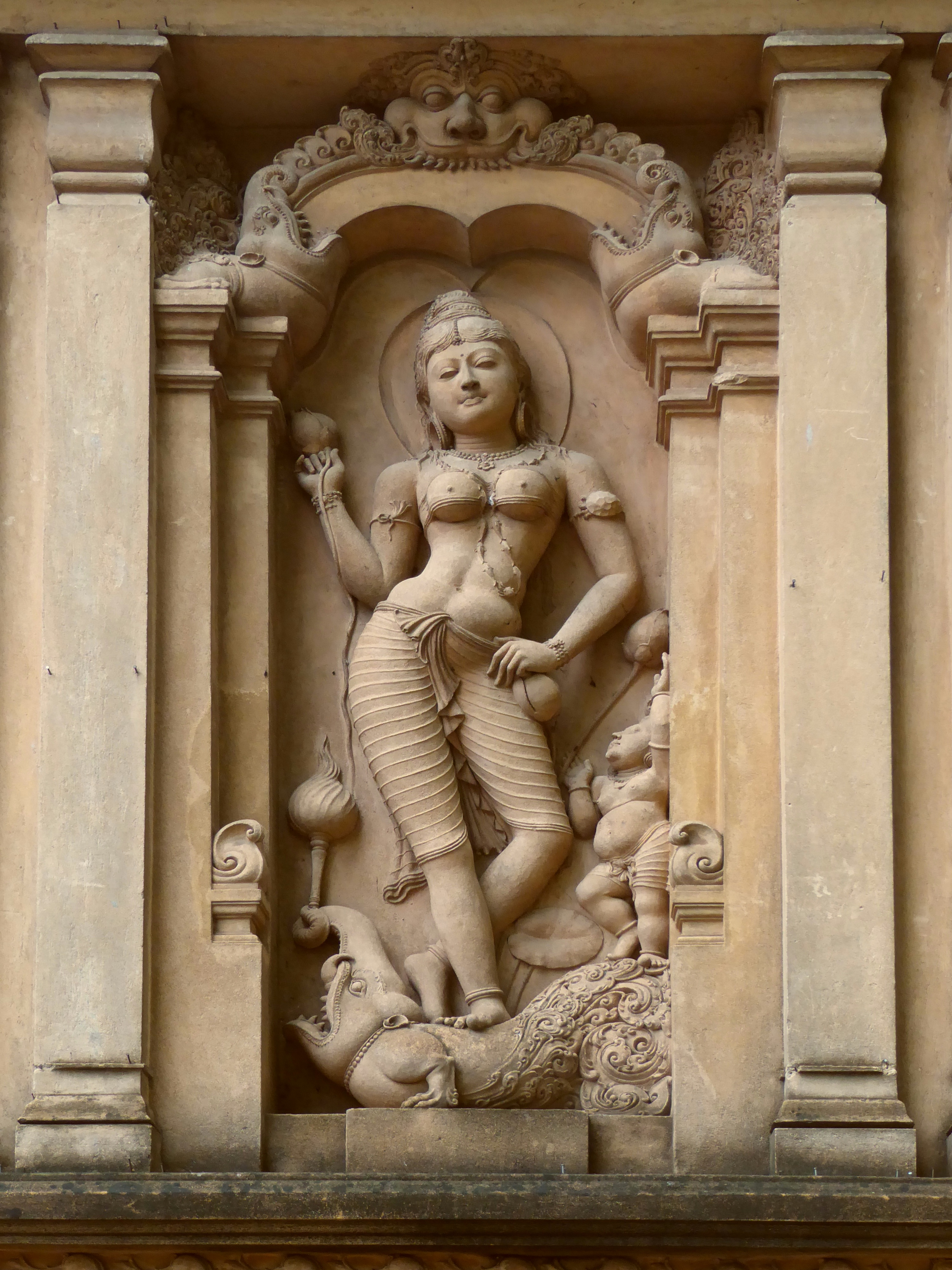
Sculpture of the goddess Ganga, Sri Lanka.

=== Ganga ===
The Vedas and Puranas mention the river Ganges to be the most sacred river. In some legends, the goddess Ganga is daughter of Himavan (the personification of the Himalayas) and Menavati (an apsara). She is the sister of the mother goddess, Parvati. She is the goddess of purity and purification, as people believe that bathing in the Ganges removes sins and helps in gaining moksha. Her mount is a creature called the makara.

A legend in the Bhagavata Purana and Devi Bhagavata Purana describes Ganga as originally being one of the two wives of Vishnu, along with Lakshmi. In the midst of a conversation, Saraswati observed that Ganga playfully kept glancing at Vishnu, behind Lakshmi and her back. Frustrated, Saraswati launched a furious tirade against Ganga, accusing her of stealing Vishnu's love away from her. When Ganga appealed to her husband to help her, he opted to remain neutral, not wishing to participate in a quarrel between his three wives, whom he loved equally. When Lakshmi attempted to soothe Saraswati's anger by reasoning with her, the jealous goddess grew angry with her as well, accusing her of disloyalty towards her. She cursed Lakshmi to be born as the tulasi plant upon the earth. Ganga, now enraged that Lakshmi had been cursed because she had defended her, cursed Saraswati that she would be incarnated as a river on earth. Saraswati issued the same curse against Ganga, informing her that sinful men would cleanse themselves of their sins with her water.

A prominent legend of Ganga is her descent from Svarga, the heaven of the devas. Bhagiratha, a king of the Solar dynasty, is stated to have performed a penance to propitiate Ganga, and urged her to descend upon earth from Svarga to liberate his ancestors' spirits, who had perished in Patala, the netherworld. She informed him that her descent would be powerful enough to flood the earth were she to directly land upon its ground, and hence told him to request Shiva to help. Bhagiratha performed another penance to propitiate the destroyer deity, and Shiva agreed to lend his assistance. When Ganga descended upon the earth, Shiva captured her waters in his matted hair, and released her gently upon the earth. Heeding Bhagiratha's request, she flowed to Patala to ritually cleanse his ancestors' spirits, and then flowed into the ocean.

=== Yamuna ===
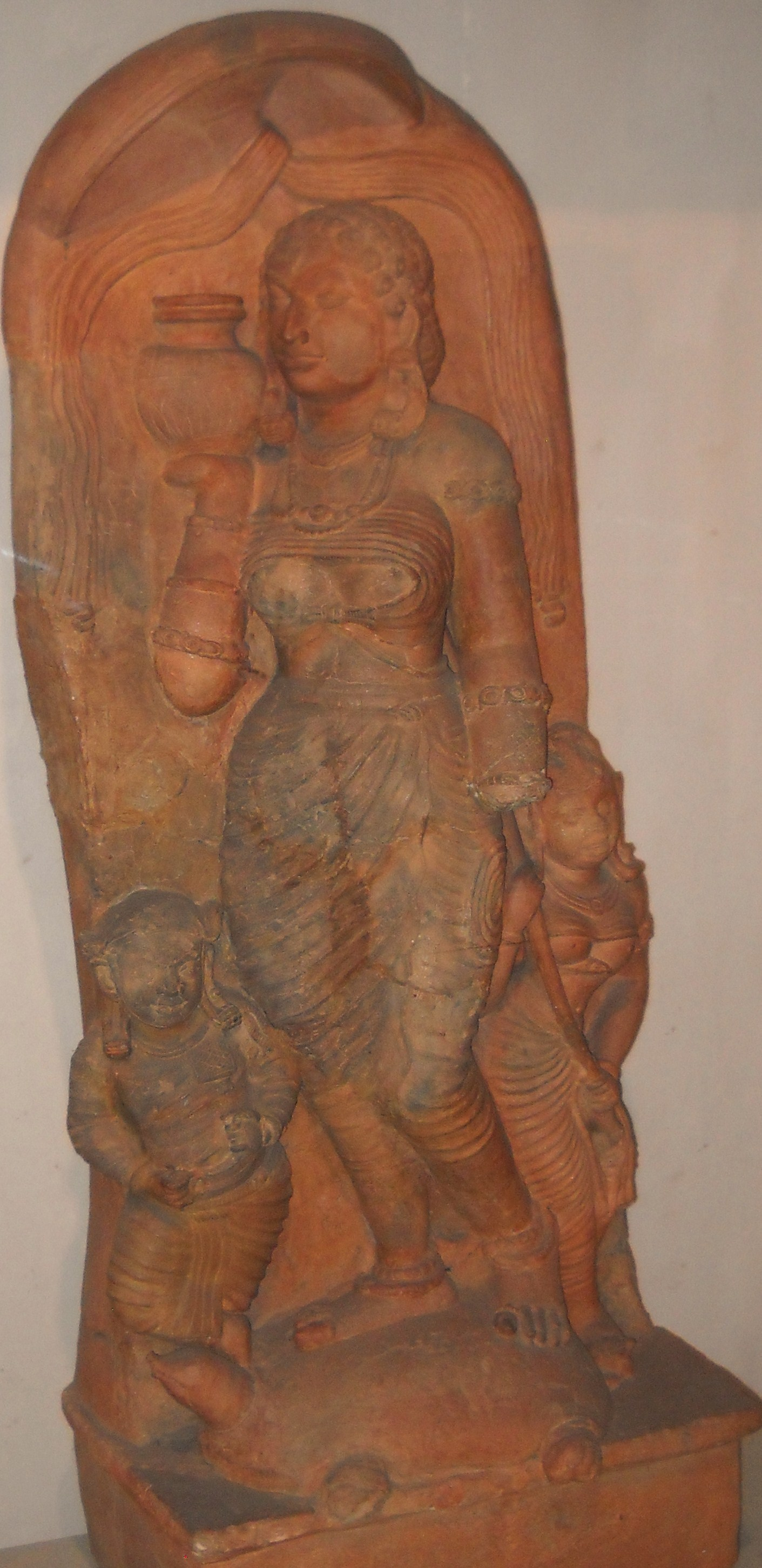
5th-century terracotta sculpture of Yamuna with attendants

Yamuna, or Yami, is the personification of the Yamuna river. She is described to be daughter of Surya, the sun god, and Saranyu, the cloud goddess. She is the goddess of life, and the twin of Yama, the god of the underworld. Her other sibling is Tapati, another river goddess. In later texts, she is known as Kalindi. In the Bhagavata Purana, in a legend that is associated with canal irrigation, the deity Balarama once wished to sport with some women in the Yamuna river. When he beckoned the goddess Yamuna to come to him, she refused to shift from her banks. Hence, Balarama used his plough, and forcibly dragged the river goddess to the orchard where he stood.

=== Saraswati ===
The goddess Saraswati was originally represented as a river goddess, the goddess of the eponymous Saraswati River. She later developed into one of the principal goddesses in Hinduism, regarded to be the goddess of knowledge, music, speech, and art. The Sarasvati river is mentioned in the Rigveda, and is believed to have dried up through the course of time.

In some texts, it is written that once there was a terrible battle between the Bhargavas and Hehayas, and from this an all-consuming fire called Vadavagni was born, which had the potential to destroy the whole world. Indra, Vishnu, and the devas visited Saraswati, requesting her to deposit the fire in the western ocean, in order to protect the universe. Saraswati told Vishnu that she would only agree to assist them if her consort, Brahma, told her to do so. Brahma ordered her to deposit the Vadavagni in the western ocean. Saraswati agreed, and accompanied by Ganga, she left Brahmaloka, and arrived at Sage Uttanka's ashrama. There, she met Shiva, who had decided to carry Ganga. He gave the Vadavagni in a pot to Saraswati, and told her to originate from the plaksha tree. Saraswati merged with the tree, and transformed into a river. From there, she flowed towards Pushkara. Saraswati continued her journey towards the ocean, and stopped once at Pushkarini, where she redeemed humans from their sins. At last, she reached the end of her journey, and immersed the fire into the ocean.

=== Narmada ===
The goddess Narmada is the personification of the Narmada river. She is also known as Reva. According to popular tradition, she is said to have been born from the sweat of Shiva, who had been performing a penance on Mount Riksha. Hence, she is regarded to be the deity's daughter. According to one legend, she is said to have been blessed by Shiva to possess the ability to destroy the sins of all those who bathe in her waters, and become as sacred in the south as Ganga was in the north.

=== Kaveri ===
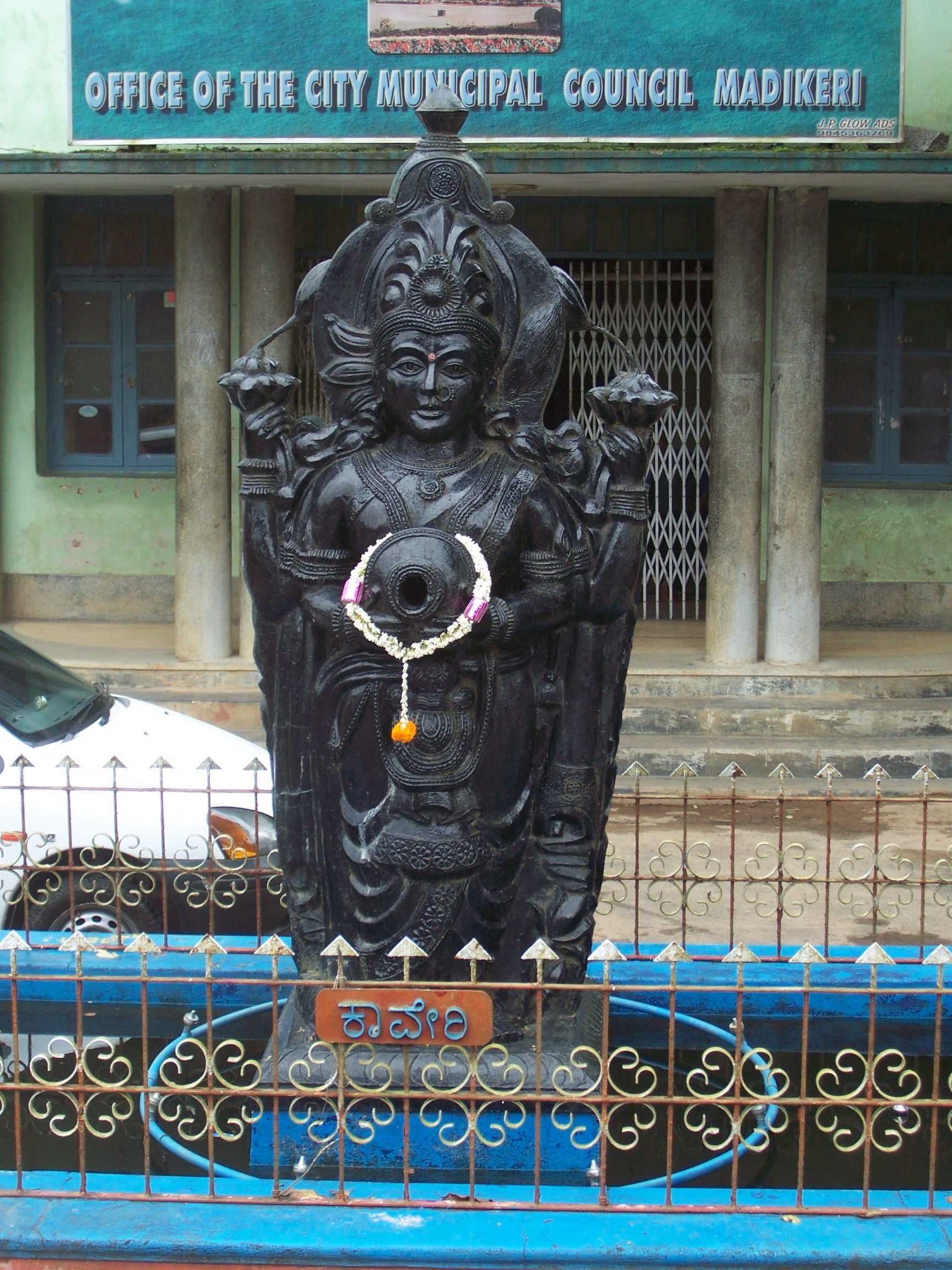
Statue of the goddess Kaveri, Madikeri.

The goddess Kaveri, also known locally as Kaveriamma, is the personification of the river Kaveri. According to the Skanda Purana, during the episode of the Samudra Manthana, Vishnu assumed his ravishing female form of Mohini to offer the elixir of eternal life to the devas, and deny it to the asuras. His consort, Lakshmi, sent an apsara named Lopamudra to assist Mohini in this endeavour. Lopamudra was raised by Brahma as his adopted daughter after this event. When King Kavera propitiated Brahma for a child, the deity blessed him with Lopamudra, with the patronymic Kaveri, as his daughter, so that she would rid people of their sins and usher in fertility. When the sage Agastya wished Kaveri to marry him, she agreed, but on the condition that she would leave him if he were to ever leave her alone for too long. Agastya agreed, but one day, too occupied with his disciples, he did leave her on her lonesome for a substantial period of time. Kaveri flowed into the sage's kamandalam, and soon coursed southwards. Despite the attempts of her husband's disciples to stop her, she flowed into the ocean, and is regarded to be sacred ever since.

=== Godavari ===
The goddess Godavari is the personification of the Godavari river. The river Godavari is strongly associated with Rama, who is said to have traversed its banks in the Ramayana. According to legend, the sage Gautama lived near the Brahmagiri hills, and had gained the boon of a bottomless grain-supplying well. His foes led a cow into the granary, which Gautama started to pursue. The cow is described to have fallen dead during the chase. To expiate the sin of having caused the death of a sacred creature, Gautama propitiated the goddess Ganga to descend upon his hermitage and cleanse it. She acquiesced, descending upon the land as the goddess Godavari, along with Shiva.

=== Krishna ===
The goddess Krishna is the personification of the river Krishna. According to a local legend, Brahma was once performing a yajna, and the presence of his wife was required by a priest. Since Savitri, the first wife of the deity was absent, his second wife, Gayatri, participated in the ceremony in her place. Savitri rushed to the spot when she heard the chanting of mantras, and demanded to know why Gayatri had taken her place. She directed her fury at Vishnu and Shiva, transforming the former into the Krishna river.

=== Sindhu ===
Sindhu refers to the personification of the river Indus, revered as the goddess of rivers. She is described in texts such as the Vedas, the Puranas, as well as the Mahabharata. Bharata is described to have been offered veneration by this goddess. She is also described to have attended a discussion of river goddesses regarding the duties of women, presided over by Parvati. A sacrifice to the Sindhu is also referenced in The Life of Apollonius of Tyana. Bulls and horses along with gold are sacrificed to the river Sindhu.

=== Tapati ===
Tapati refers to the personification of the river Tapti. Described to be the daughter of Surya and the younger sister of Savitri, she is married to a king named Samvarana in Hindu texts.

=== Brahmaputra ===
Literally translated as the, 'son of Brahma', the legendary origin of the river Brahmaputra is featured in the Kalika Purana. According to this text, impressed by the piety of a sage named Shantanu and his wife, Amogha, who resided along the banks of the river Lohita, Brahma blessed the couple with his own child in the latter's womb. After his birth, the child took the form of a river, where deities and apsaras would bathe.

== See also ==
- Sacred waters
- Theertham
- Wetlands and islands in Germanic paganism
