= Mata Ni Pachedi =

Ritual textile painting tradition

Mata ni Pachedi (Gujarati: માતા ની પછેડી), meaning "behind the Mother Goddess", is a ritual textile painting tradition originating from Gujarat, India. These cloth panels serve as portable shrines or sacred backdrops for the worship of the Mother Goddess (Mata) and are intrinsically associated with the Devipujak or Vaghri community of Ahmedabad.

== Origins and community ==
The tradition is believed to be at least 300 to 400 years old, with community oral histories suggesting a lineage extending back 700 to 1000 years. Its inception is attributed to caste-based exclusion, which barred the Devipujak community from mainstream Hindu temples. In response, they began painting their own sacred images of the goddess on cloth, effectively creating mobile places of worship. These textiles were often used to construct makeshift shrines, typically with four or five panels arranged together.

== Artists ==
=== Kiran Bhulabhai Chitara ===
Kiran Bhulabhai Chitara is an Indian folk artist associated with the traditional Mata ni Pachedi art form of Gujarat, India. He belongs to the Chitara family of Ahmedabad, which has preserved and practiced the ritual textile painting tradition for generations. He is known for creating hand-painted and hand-block-printed depictions of Hindu goddesses using traditional natural dyes and temple-cloth compositions.

Kiran Chitara received the National Award in 2006 for his contribution to Mata ni Pachedi art. His works have been exhibited in India and internationally as examples of Gujarat’s ritual textile heritage. He has also contributed to preserving and teaching the traditional techniques of the craft.

Website
https://matanipachedi.co/

Contact
https://www.matanipachedi.co/team-1/

=== Om Chitara ===
Om Chitara is an Indian contemporary folk artist associated with the traditional Mata ni Pachedi painting tradition of Gujarat. He belongs to the Chitara family of Ahmedabad and represents a younger generation of artists continuing the hereditary practice of ritual textile painting.

His work focuses on preserving traditional iconography while presenting Mata ni Pachedi through exhibitions, workshops, and cultural heritage initiatives. Om Chitara is regarded as one of the youngest practicing artists in the Chitara lineage connected to the Mata ni Pachedi tradition.

Website
https://matanipachedi.co/

Artist Contact
https://www.matanipachedi.co/team-1/

The Devipujak community, historically nomadic and marginalized under British rule as a 'Criminal Tribe,' has long been associated with ritual practices centered around the goddess. Within the community, specific roles were delineated: Chitaras (painters), Bhuvas (ritual priests), and Jagorias (narrative singers).

== Artistic characteristics ==
Mata Ni Pachedi paintings depict the Mother Goddess in her many forms— Durga, Kali, and local manifestations such as Vahanvati, Hadkai, Meladi, and Bahuchar Mata —often enshrined in temple-like architecture and surrounded by devotees, animals, and mythological narratives.

Traditionally, the artwork is rendered in a restricted palette: black from iron rust and jaggery fermentation, red from alizarin with alum mordant, and white from the base cotton cloth. These colors carry symbolic weight: red for energy and divine blood, black for spiritual protection, and white for purity. Other natural dyes like turmeric, indigo, and henna were used sparingly.

The central goddess is positioned hierarchically at the core of the textile, framed by symmetrical panels and narrative grids. The use of block printing for repetitive motifs and borders often complements the freehand kalam (pen) drawing of primary figures.

== Ritual function and cultural significance ==
Beyond aesthetic function, Mata ni Pachedi serves as a sacred space imbued with spiritual presence. It is central to rituals conducted during Navaratri and other goddess festivals. The textiles are also used as votive offerings (manat), gifted to the deity in fulfillment of vows. Over time, damaged or old cloths are ritually immersed in holy rivers, acknowledging their sacredness even in disuse.

The art form functions within a performative ritual matrix, activated by priests, singers, and devotees. These practices represent a confluence of visual, oral, and ceremonial traditions rooted in the lived religious expression of the Devipujak community.

== Materials and techniques ==
The process involves labor-intensive steps: pre-washing and mordanting the cotton with Harda (myrobalan), outlining using fermented iron-black dye, application of alum for red areas, dye fixation via boiling with alizarin and flowers like dhawda (Woodfordia fruticosa), and repeated river washings. The Sabarmati River is particularly significant, historically providing the flowing water essential to color development and fabric cleansing.

Modern variations incorporate synthetic dyes, broader color palettes, and silk or khadi bases. Block printing has become more prevalent, especially for commercial production, raising concerns about authenticity and ritual value.

== Comparison with Kalamkari ==
Often called the "Kalamkari of Gujarat," Mata ni Pachedi shares technical similarities with the Srikalahasti style of Kalamkari, such as the use of the kalam pen and natural dyes. However, while Kalamkari narratives span epics like the Ramayana and Mahabharata, Mata ni Pachedi focuses exclusively on goddess imagery. Moreover, Mata ni Pachedi integrates block printing, while Srikalahasti Kalamkari remains purely freehand.

== Recognition and revival ==
In April 2023, Mata ni Pachedi was granted a Geographical Indication (GI) tag by the Government of India, recognizing its unique regional and traditional attributes. Preservation efforts include workshops by institutions like the National Institute of Design (NID) and Ahmedabad University, documentation by Tara Books and independent researchers, and exhibitions in international museums.

Today, only a few families—mainly of the Chitara lineage—continue this practice, balancing heritage preservation with market viability. Artists such as Bhulabhai Chitara and his son Kiran bhulabhai chitara have received national acclaim for their work.

== Contemporary relevance and influence ==
In the 21st century, the craft has gained recognition not just as ritual art but as a form of visual storytelling with global appeal. Artists have expanded their visual language to include abstract forms, environmental narratives, and modern interpretations while retaining religious symbolism. Workshops and collaborations with design schools have sparked interest among younger generations, aiding in both preservation and innovation. Art platforms and galleries are also showcasing Mata ni Pachedi alongside other forms of Indian folk art.
