= 2004 Birthday Honours =

British government recognitions

The Birthday Honours 2004 for the Commonwealth realms were announced on 11 June 2004 for the United Kingdom, New Zealand, the Cook Islands and elsewhere to celebrate the Queen's Birthday of 2004.

The recipients of honours are displayed here as they were styled before their new honour, and arranged firstly by the country whose ministers advised the Queen on the appointments, then by honour, with classes (Knight, Knight Grand Cross, etc.) and then divisions (Military, Civil, etc.) as appropriate.

== United Kingdom ==
=== Knight Bachelor ===
- David Charles Maurice Bell, For services to Business, the Arts and Charity in London.
- Trevor David Brooking, C.B.E., For services to Sport.
- Hugh Robert Collum, For services to the Nuclear Industry.
- Professor Alan William Craft, For services to Medicine.
- Professor Peter Robert Crane, For services to Horticulture and Conservation.
- Crispin Henry Lamert Davis, For services to the Information Industry.
- Thomas Joseph Duggin, HM Ambassador, Bogota.
- Leslie Elton, For services to Local Government.
- ~~Frederick Anderson Goodwin, For services to Banking.~~ (annulled)
- Professor Peter Stanley Harper, C.B.E., For services to Medicine.
- David George Henshaw, For services to Local Government
- Daniel Joseph Allso, For services to Training.
- The Right Honourable Gerald Bernard Kaufman, M.P., Member of Parliament for Manchester Gorton. For services to Parliament.
- John Anthony Lewis, O.B.E., For services to Education.
- Professor John Brian Pendry, F.R.S., For services to Science.
- Robert Weston Phillis, For services to the Media Industry.
- Alan William Steer, For services to Education.
- Julian Michael Horn-Smith, For services to International Mobile Telecommunications.
- Professor Nicholas Herbert Stern, For services to Economics.
- Geoffrey Michael Montgomery Wakeford, O.B.E., For services to Education.
- Professor David James Wallace, C.B.E., F.R.S., D.L., For services to UK Science, Technology and Engineering.
- Willard Wentworth White, C.B.E., For services to Music.
- Peter James Joseph Winship, C.B.E., Q.P.M., For services to the Police.
- Dr Gregory Winter, C.B.E, F.R.S., For services to Molecular Biology.
- Judge Richard George May, lately Judge at the International Criminal Tribunal for the former Yugoslavia.

=== Order of the Bath ===
==== Knight Grand Cross of the Order of the Bath (GCB) ====
- Sir David Bruce Omand, Permanent Secretary, Cabinet Office.

==== Knight Commander of the Order of the Bath (KCB) ====
Military Division

- Vice Admiral James Michael Burnell-Nugent, C.B.E., A.D.C.
- Lieutenant General Francis Richard Dannatt, C.B.E., M.C., late The Green Howards.

Civil Division

- Edwin Geoffrey Bowman, First Parliamentary Counsel.

==== Companions of the Order of the Bath (CB) ====
Military Division

- Rear Admiral Rory Alistair Ian McLean, O.B.E.
- Major General David Wilson, C.B.E.
- Air Vice-Marshal David Anthony Hobart.

Civil Division

- Priscilla Jean Baines, Head, Library Department, House of Commons.
- John Anthony Catlin, Director of Legal Services, Department for Work and Pensions.
- Alexis Jane Cleveland, Chief Executive, The Pension Service.
- David John Gould, Deputy Chief Executive, Defence Procurement Agency.
- Dr Ruth Hall, Chief Medical Officer for Wales.
- Christopher George Maccabe, Senior Civil Servant, Northern Ireland Office.
- Stephen John Pickford, Director, International Finance, HM Treasury.
- Robert Lee Smith, Director General, Regional Development Group, Office of the Deputy Prime Minister.
- Jonathan Edward Simon Tross, Chief Executive, Children and Family Court Advisory and Support, Department for Education and Skills.
- Eithne Victoria Wallis, lately Director General, National Probation Service for England and Wales.
- John Roger Weiss, Group Director, Business Group, Export Credits Guarantee Department.
- Philip Martin Wheatley, Director General, HM Prison Service

=== Order of Saint Michael and Saint George ===
==== Knight Grand Cross of the Order of St Michael and St George (GCMG) ====
- Sir John Stephen Wall, K.C.M.G., L.V.O., Head of European Secretariat, Cabinet Office.

==== Knight Commander of the Order of St Michael and St George (KCMG) ====
- Sherard Louis Cowper-Coles, C.M.G., L.V.O., HM Ambassador, Riyadh.
- Gregory David Green, C.M.G., Director General, British Council.

==== Companion of the Order of St Michael and St George (CMG) ====
- James Oswald Atkinson, HM Ambassador, Kinshasa.
- Henry Joly Dixon, lately Director, Directorate-General for Economic and Financial Affairs, European Commission.
- David John Fitton, Deputy Head of Mission, Ankara and lately Acting Consul-General, Istanbul.
- Adrian Greer, British Council Director, Russia.
- Ms Joanna Christian Mary Korner, Q.C., lately Senior Prosecuting Counsel, International Criminal Tribunal for the former Yugoslavia.
- William Andrew O'Neil, lately Secretary-General, International Maritime Organization.
- Anne Fyfe, Mrs Pringle, HM Ambassador, Prague.
- David Frank Richmond, UK Special Representative for Iraq.
- Christopher Michael John Segar, Head of British Office, Baghdad.

=== Royal Victorian Order ===
==== Knight Commander of the Royal Victorian Order (KCVO) ====
- Vice Admiral David Anthony James (Tom) Blackburn, C.B., L.V.O., Master of the Household.

==== Commander of the Royal Victorian Order (CVO) ====
- Colonel Henry Malcolm Chitty Havergal, O.B.E., lately Gentleman Usher.
- Colonel Anthony Paul Arengo Arengo-Jones, lately Secretary General, International Award Association (The Duke of Edinburgh's Award).
- John Lyles, C.B.E., lately Lord Lieutenant of West Yorkshire.
- Marcus Edward Setchell, Surgeon-Gynaecologist, Royal Household.

==== Lieutenant of the Royal Victorian Order (LVO) ====
- David William Gareth Beynon, Obstetrician, Frimley Park Hospital.
- Miss Heather Rosalind Colebrook, M.V.O., Chief Housekeeper, Royal Household.
- Elsa Myfanwy, Mrs Davies, Director of the National Playing Fields Association
- Dr Jonathan James Cornelius Holliday, Apothecary to the Royal Household, Windsor Castle.
- Elisabeth Aline Clare, Mrs Hunka, Director of Personnel, Royal Household.
- Elizabeth Harriet, Mrs Bowes-Lyon, Lady in Waiting to The Princess Royal.
- Dr Karyn Peta Maltby, Paediatrician, Frimley Park Hospital.
- Philip Guy McCracken, chairman, Duchy Originals.
- Dr David Colin Mitchell, Apothecary to The Prince of Wales.
- Miss Theresa-Mary Morton, M.V.O., Exhibitions Coordinator, Royal Collection.
- Justin Robert O’Connor, Official Secretary to the Governor of Queensland.
- Peter John Ord, Resident Factor, Balmoral Estate.
- William Edward Johnston Preston, lately Head of Royal Households' Secretariat, Foreign and Commonwealth Office.
- Michael John Stephenson, M.B.E., D.L., lately County Board Chairman, The Prince's Trust.
- The Reverend Canon John Austin White, Canon of Windsor.

==== Member of the Royal Victorian Order (MVO) ====
- Frederick George Benefer, R.V.M., Fruit Farm Manager, Sandringham Estate.
- Miss Barbara Helen Kerry Bishop, Visitor Manager, Buckingham Palace.
- David Stuart Brown, lately Special Services Manager, English, Welsh and Scottish Railways.
- Miss Caroline Ann Cassels, Matron, King Edward VII's Hospital (Sister Agnes).
- Inspector David Dance, Metropolitan Police. For services to Royalty Protection.
- Lieutenant Commander Alastair Neil Spencer Graham, Royal Navy, Equerry to The Prince of Wales.
- Inspector Ted Kania, Gloucestershire Constabulary. For services to Gloucestershire Constabulary.
- Harold Norman Loughran, lately Development Award Assessor, The Prince's Trust.
- Thomas Henry Sharp, Chief Yeoman Warder, HM Tower of London.
- Adrian Michael Smith, Assistant to the Master of the Household, 'C' Branch.
- Sergeant Kevin Sullivan, Metropolitan Police. For services to Royalty Protection.
- David Charles Wheeler, Senior Furniture Conservator, Royal Collection.

=== Order of the British Empire ===
==== Dame Commander of the Order of the British Empire (DBE) ====
Civil division

- Enid, Mrs Bibby, Headteacher, Wood Green High School College of Sport, Wednesbury, West Midlands. For services to Education.
- Diana, Lady Brittan of Spennithorne, C.B.E., J.P., lately chair, Community Fund. For Public Service and Charity.
- Hilary Mary, Mrs Cropper, C.B.E., Member, National Employment Panel and Security Commission. For Public and Charitable Services.
- Ms Jacqueline Docherty, Director of Nursing and Operations, King's College Hospital. For services to the NHS.
- Professor Olwen Hufton, emeritus Fellow, Merton College, University of Oxford. For services to History.
- Ms Deirdre Mary Hutton, C.B.E., Executive Chair, Consumer Council. For services to Consumers.
- Dr Gillian Margaret Morgan, Chief Executive, NHS Confederation. For services to the NHS.
- Ms Denise Platt, C.B.E., chair, Commission for Social Care Inspection. For services to Social Care.
- Marion Audrey, Mrs Roe, M.P., Member of Parliament for Broxbourne. For services to Parliament.
- Audrey Frances, Mrs Glover, C.M.G., lately Head of UK Delegation to the UN Commission on Human Rights.
- The Honourable Pamela Felicity Gordon. For public service, Bermuda.

==== Knight Commander of the Order of the British Empire (KBE) ====
Military division

- Lieutenant General Philip Charles Cornwallis Trousdell, C.B., late The Royal Irish Regiment.
- Air Marshal Robert Alfred Wright, A.F.C., Royal Air Force.

Civil division

- Professor Anthony James Leggett. For services to physics.

==== Commander of the Order of the British Empire (CBE) ====
Military division

- Commodore Christopher John Parry, Royal Navy. Commodore Charles Bernard Hilton Stevenson, Royal Navy.
- Commodore Hugh Rudkin Whitaker, A.D.C., Royal Navy.
- Colonel Christopher Michael Bruce Coats (488407), late Royal Regiment of Artillery.
- Colonel Michael Lithgow, M.B.E. (504479), late Royal Corps of Signals.
- Brigadier Andrew Donisthorpe Meek (490927), late The Duke of Wellington's Regiment.
- Brigadier Maurice Nugent (489574), late Adjutant General's Corps (Royal Military Police).
- Brigadier Edward John Torrens-Spence (493268), late The Royal Dragoon Guards.
- Colonel Richard Hardy Duncan Toomey, M.B.E. (509586), late The Devonshire and Dorset Regiment.
- Brigadier Christopher Colin Wilson, A.D.C. (495598), late Royal Regiment of Artillery.
- Air Commodore Michael John Harwood, M.B.E., Royal Air Force.
- Group Captain Raymond Lock, O.B.E., Royal Air Force.
- Group Captain Andrew Douglas Pulford, Royal Air Force.

Civil division

- George Lawrence Hastings Alderson, chair, Rare Breeds Survival Trust and Trustee, Rare Breeds International. For services to Conservation.
- Ms Helen Anne Alexander, Chief Executive, The Economist Group. For services to Publishing.
- John Thomas Anderson, Trauma and Orthopaedic Surgeon, South Tees Acute Hospitals NHS Trust. For services to Medicine.
- Michael Ash, deputy director of Planning, Office of the Deputy Prime Minister.
- Nicholas Charles Fairthorn Barber. For services to Heritage.
- Colin Barrow, chairman, Improvement and Development Agency. For services to Local Government.
- Professor John Michael Batty, Director, Centre for Advanced Spatial Analysis, University College, London. For services to Geography.
- Michael John Baunton, President, Perkins Engines Company. For services to the Automotive and Engineering Industries.
- Karan Faridoon Bilimoria, D.L., Member, National Employment Panel. For services to Business.
- Miss Valerie Margaret Bourne, O.B.E., artistic director, Dance Umbrella. For services to Dance.
- Dr. Roger Michael Boyle, National Director for Heart Disease, Department of Health.
- David Brown, Detective Superintendent, Greater Manchester Police. For services to the Police.
- Professor Ian Waugh Bruce, lately Director-General, Royal National Institute of the Blind. For services to Blind and Partially Sighted People.
- The Right Worshipful Sheila Morag Clark Cameron, Q.C., Dean of the Arches and Auditor of the Chancery Court of York. For services to the Church of England.
- Ian Percy Cannell, M.B.E., lately National Chair, Royal British Legion. For services to the Royal British Legion.
- Edward Francis Cantle, chair, Independent Review Team on Community Cohesion. For services to Local Government.
- Ruth, Mrs.Carnall, Director Change Management Programme, Department of Health.
- Michael John Cassidy, deputy chairman, City Architecture Forum. For services to the Corporation and City of London.
- Professor David Alan Chipperfield, Architect and Principal, David Chipperfield Architects. For services to Architecture.
- Dr. Judy Anne MacArthur Clark, chair, Farm Animal Welfare Council. For services to Animal Welfare.
- Geoffrey Charles Cooper, O.B.E., managing director, Chelton/Cobham plc. For services to the Defence Industry.
- Hazel Josephine Aronson, The Right Honourable Lady Cosgrove, Q.C., Judge. For services to the Criminal Justice System in Scotland.
- Professor John Patrick Croxall, Head, Conservation Biology, British Antarctic Survey. For services to Ornithology.
- Dennis Tyrone Davis, O.B.E., Q.F.S.M., lately HM Chief Inspector of Fire Services for Scotland.
- Malcolm John Dexter-Tissington, managing director, Soundalive. For services to Audio Tour Guides.
- Geoffrey Charles Elliott, Journalist. For services to Journalism.
- Diana Margaret, Mrs. Ellis, chairman, Amateur Rowing Association. For services to Rowing.
- Professor Hadyn Douglas Ellis, Deputy Vice-Chancellor, University of Wales, Cardiff. For services to Higher Education.
- Dr. John Ferrie, Group Managing Director, Smiths Aerospace. For services to the Defence and Aerospace Industries.
- Thomas Oliver Flood, Chief Executive, British Trust for Conservation Volunteers. For services to Conservation.
- Bryan Forbes, President, National Youth Theatre of Great Britain. For services to the Arts.
- Professor Farieda Fortune, Professor of Medicine in relation to Oral Health, Queen Mary University of London.
- Mohammed Tarique Ghaffur, Q.P.M., Assistant Commissioner, Metropolitan Police Service. For services to the Police.
- David Gillett, lately Head of Information Systems and Services Department, Department for International Development.
- Ian Robert Glenday, executive director, Gateways, Office of Government Commerce.
- Miss Judith Anne Grylls, Headteacher, Osmani Primary School, Tower Hamlets, London. For services to Education.
- Andrew Joseph Gunz, Assistant Solicitor, Inland Revenue.
- Roger Michael De Haan, D.L., chair, SAGA Group. For services to Business, Charity and Education.
- Professor Christopher John Ham, Professor of Health Policy and Management, University of Birmingham. For services to the NHS.
- Dr. Vernon George Handley, Conductor. For services to Music.
- Professor David Antony Haslam, General Medical Practitioner and chairman, Royal College of General Practitioners. For services to Healthcare.
- Gavin Douglas Henderson, Principal, Trinity College of Music and chair, National Foundation for Youth Music. For services to Music and to the Arts.
- Leonard Alexander Higson, lately Area Procurator Fiscal, Glasgow.
- Lee Terence Hughes. For public service.
- John Vincent Hurt, Actor. For services to Drama.
- David Jackson, J.P., Chief Executive, Bradford Teaching Hospitals NHS Trust. For services to the NHS.
- Thomas James Jennings, chair, Rotary Group Ltd. For services to the Construction and Engineering Industries in Northern Ireland.
- Miss Alison Kerr, Chief Crown Prosecutor, Crown Prosecution Service.
- Ian Michael Laing, D.L. For charitable services especially to the Arts, Business, Education and Health.
- Richard Philip Ley, lately Central Operations Director, Driver Vehicle Licensing Agency, Swansea.
- Anne Mary, Mrs. Lonsdale, President, New Hall, University of Cambridge. For services to Higher Education.
- His Honour Judge Shaun Lyons, Secretary of the Council of Circuit Judges. For services to the Administration of Justice.
- Colin MacLean, Headteacher, Auchinleck Academy, Ayrshire. For services to Education.
- Professor Joseph Peter McGeehan, Director, Centre for Communications Research, University of Bristol. For services to the Communications Industry.
- William McGinnis, O.B.E., D.L., lately chair, Learning and Skills Board. For services to Training and Business in Northern Ireland.
- Roger Joseph McGough, O.B.E., Poet, Children's Author and Broadcaster. For services to Literature.
- Dr. Marion North-McNamara, O.B.E., lately Principal and Chief Executive, Laban Centre, London. For services to Dance.
- Pamela Mary, Mrs. McPhee, Chief Officer, Durham Area. For services to the National Probation Service.
- Geoffrey John Mulgan, Senior Civil Servant, Prime Minister's Office.
- Peter Charles Nicholson, chairman, Royal National Lifeboat Institution. For services to the Maritime Rescue.
- Professor Jean Agnes Orr, Head, School of Nursing and Midwifery and Professor of Nursing, Queens University, Belfast. For services to Nursing Education.
- Martin David Paisner. For charitable services.
- Professor David Neil Payne, F.R.S., Director, Optoelectronics Research Centre, University of Southampton. For services to Photonics.
- Alan Pedder, chair, Remploy. For services to Disabled People.
- Barbara, Mrs.Phillips, Director, Social Enterprise Unit Department of Trade and Industry.
- Professor John Anthony Pickett, F.R.S., Head, Biological Chemistry Division, Rothamsted Research Station. For services to Biological Chemistry.
- Professor Phil Redmond, Television Writer and Producer. For services to Drama.
- John Edward Roberts, Chief Executive, United Utilities plc. For services to the Utility Industries.
- Jane Mary Elizabeth, Mrs. Holderness-Roddam, L.V.O. For services to Equestrian Sport.
- Miss Katherine Patricia Routledge, O.B.E., Actress. For services to Drama.
- Brian Michael Rowntree, chair, Probation Board of Northern Ireland. For services to the Criminal Justice System.
- Lindsay Allan Roy, Headteacher, Inverkeithing High School, Fife. For services to Education.
- Paul Chandrasekharan Sabapathy, O.B.E., chair and Pro Chancellor, University of Central England. For services to Education and to Business in the West Midlands.
- Andrew James Seber, County Education Officer, Hampshire Local Education Authority. For services to Education.
- Carol Frances, Mrs. Sergeant, lately managing director, Financial Services Authority. For services to Financial Regulation.
- Stephen Arthur Shaw, Prisons and Probation Ombudsman.
- Dr. Colin William Sinclair, lately Chief Executive, Sunderland City Council. For services to Local Government.
- Professor Annette Dionne Karmiloff-Smith, Head, Neurocognitive Development Unit, Institute of Child Health. For services to Developmental Cognitive Neuroscience.
- Gordon James Smith, Resident Director for Scotland, IBM and chair, CBI Scotland. For services to Business in Scotland.
- Ronald Richard Spinney, chair, Hammerson plc. For services to the Property Industry.
- Professor William Stevely, Principal and Vice-Chancellor, Robert Gordon University, Aberdeen. For services to Higher Education.
- Barry John Stickings, Chairman BASF plc and the Chemistry Leadership Council. For services to the Chemicals Industry.
- Graham Stow, lately Group Chief Executive, Britannia Building Society. For services to Business and to the Department for Work and Pensions.
- Barbara, Mrs. Stuttle, chair, Association for Nurse Prescribing. For services to the NHS.
- Ms Clare Sumner, Senior Civil Servant, Prime Minister's Office.
- Colonel John William Frederick Sweeting, Chief Executive, Treloar Trust and lately chair, Association of National Specialist Colleges. For services to Special Needs Education.
- Ms Christine Tacon, General Manager, Farmcare (part of the Co-operative Group). For services to Agriculture.
- Ann, Mrs. Taylor, Director, Coal Health Claims Unit, Department of Trade and Industry
- William John Anthony Timpson, chair and Chief Executive, Timpson. For services to the Retail Sector.
- Philip Cursley Toase, Chief Fire Officer, West Yorkshire Fire Service. For services to the Fire Service.
- Thomas Keith Todd, chair, Broadband Stakeholder Group, Easynet plc. and Fast Fill plc. For services to the Telecommunications Industry.
- Archibald Boyd Tunnock, M.B.E., managing director, Tunnocks Bakery. For services to charity in Scotland.
- David John Verey, lately chair, Board of Trustees, Tate Galleries. For services to Art.
- Peter Derek Watkins, Senior Civil Servant, Ministry of Defence.
- Ruth, Mrs. Westbrook, lately Headteacher, Tile Hill Wood Girls' School, Coventry. For services to Education.
- Mary Ruth, Mrs. Weston. For charitable services through the Garfield Weston Foundation.
- Dr. Susan Frances Whyte, Consultant Psychiatrist, Greater Glasgow Primary Care NHS Trust. For services to Medicine.
- Professor John William Wilesmith, Head of Epidemiology Department, Veterinary Laboratories Agency.
- Professor Nairn Hutchison Fulton Wilson, Dean and Head, Guy's, King's and St. Thomas' Dental Institute, King's College London. For services to Dentistry and Healthcare Regulation.
- David Michael Lindley Witherow, lately Executive Chair, Radio Authority. For services to Broadcasting.
- Ewart Wooldridge, lately Director, Civil Service College.

Diplomatic Service and Overseas List

- Frederic Franklin. For services to ballet.
- Dennis Barry Gillings. For services to UK-US relations in the pharmaceutical sector.
- Anastasios Paul Leventis. For services to conservation and the environment overseas, especially in Nigeria.
- Felix Ernest Pizarello, lately Judge of the Supreme Court, Gibraltar.
- Graham Norman Charles Ward. For services to exports.

==== Officer of the Order of the British Empire (OBE) ====
Military Division

- Commander Stephen Ronald Aiken, Royal Navy.
- Acting Captain Iain Davidson Arthur, Royal Navy.
- Colonel Paul Richard Denning.
- Lieutenant Colonel Michael Philip Ellis, Royal Marines.
- Lieutenant Colonel Simon Jeremy Hall, Royal Marines.
- Commodore Nigel John Francis Raby, Royal Navy.
- Acting Colonel Richard Anthony Winchcombe Spencer.
- Lieutenant Colonel Richard Dennis Watts, Royal Marines.
- Lieutenant Colonel Peter Maclaren Campbell (488403), The Queen's Royal Lancers.
- Acting Colonel David Kevin George Cox(502510), Surrey Army Cadet Force.
- Lieutenant Colonel Hugh Ralph Aird Eaton, M.B.E. (524289), The Highlanders.
- Lieutenant Colonel John Michael Edwards (502412), Corps of Royal Electrical and Mechanical Engineers.
- Lieutenant Colonel Peter James Gosney (507446), The Royal Logistic Corps.
- Lieutenant Colonel Jeremy Troy Green (510321), Adjutant General's Corps (Royal Military Police).
- Lieutenant Colonel Neale Ashley Jouques (527140), The Royal Logistic Corps.
- Lieutenant Colonel Neil Douglas Morrison(504487), The Royal Logistic Corps.
- Lieutenant Colonel Timothy John Blair Sinclair (495234), Royal Regiment of Artillery.
- Group Captain Antony Simon Barmby (5203233H), Royal Air Force.
- Squadron Leader Christopher Paul Beckley (5206089H), Royal Air Force.
- Wing Commander Stephen Dargan (0213718G), Royal Auxiliary Air Force.
- Wing Commander Gavin John Davey (5203129X), Royal Air Force.
- Wing Commander Gary Dennis Edwards (8027490L), Royal Air Force.
- Wing Commander Andrew Victor Macleod Murray (2619841P), Royal Air Force Volunteer Reserve (Training).
- Wing Commander Michael Peter Naworynsky (8024026H), Royal Air Force.

Civil Division

- Roger Henry Allsopp, Founding Chairman, Medical Specialists Group. For services to Medicine in Guernsey.
- Dr. Peter Edward Andry, O.A.M., vice-president, Music Therapy Charity. For services to Music and Charity.
- Professor Robin Richard Baker, Director, Ravensbourne College oF Design and Communication, Kent. For services to Higher Education.
- Duncan Walker Bannatyne. For services to business and Charity in the North East of England.
- Robert John Bansback, Director, Corporate Strategy, Meat and Livestock Commission. For services to the Meat and Livestock Industry.
- Marion, Mrs. Bastin, lately Head, Trials Unit, Crown Prosecution Service, Cambridgeshire.
- Annie Murray Smith, Mrs. Bennett, Headteacher, Knotty Ash Primary School, Liverpool. For services to Education.
- Brian Bennett, Musician, Songwriter and Composer for Film and Television. For services to Music.
- Katherine Susan, Mrs. Bennett, Head of Government Affairs, GM Vauxhall Motors. For services to the Automotive Industry and to Charity.
- Neil Winston Benson, chair and Honorary Secretary, Saints and Sinners Club. For charitable services.
- Derek Boden, Member, Bury Metropolitan Borough Council and Leader, North West Assembly. For services to Local Government.
- Ms Helen Boon, Practice Development Nurse, North Tyneside Primary Care Trust and Northumbria Healthcare NHS Trust. For services to the NHS.
- Brian George Booth, J.P., D.L. For services to the community in Preston, Lancashire.
- Mark Noy Boulton, executive director, International Centre for Conservation Education. For services to Education in Developing Countries.
- John Boyle, Company Director, The Hamilton Portfolio Ltd. For services to Business.
- Martin Tilston Broadhurst, Chief Executive, Marshall Aerospace. For services to the Aerospace Industry.
- Professor Richard Anthony Brook, President, Sira Group. For services to the UK Space Industry.
- Margaret Jayne, Mrs. Brown, Chief Executive, Doncaster East Primary Care Trust. For services to the NHS.
- Dr. Robert Adrian Brown. For services to Nature Conservation in Northern Ireland.
- Sarah Elizabeth, Mrs. Brown, Member, Competition Commission. For services to Business.
- George Herbert Hamilton Bryan. For services to Tourism in the West Midlands.
- Professor Susan Jean Buckley, Director of Research and Training, The Down Syndrome Educational Trust. For services to Special Needs Education.
- Kathleen, Mrs. Burgess, Director of Social Work. For services to the Soldiers', Sailors' and Airmen's Families Association.
- Keith Burgess, Vice-chair, Public Services Productivity Panel. For public service.
- Geoffey Alan Burtenshaw, Head of Avionics Flight Test, Civil Aviation Authority. For services to Civil Aviation.
- Peter David Burton, Chair of the Trustees, Wood Green Animal Shelters. For services to the Welfare of Animals.
- John Barnard Bush, J.P., D.L. For services to the community in Wiltshire.
- Ms Ruth Caleb, Executive Producer, BBC Television. For services to Drama.
- Lavinia Margaret Leila, Mrs. Carey, Director General, British Video Association and vice-president, National Children's Home. For services to Young People.
- Joan Fiona, Mrs. Castle. For charitable services, especially to Global Care.
- Professor David Chadwick, chair, Secretary of State for Transport's Honorary Medical Advisory Panel on Driving and Disorders of the Nervous System. For services to Road Safety.
- Hasan Chawdhry, Headteacher, Edinburgh Primary School, Waltham Forest, London. For services to Education.
- Susanna Mary, Mrs. Cheal, M.B.E., Chief Executive, The Who Cares? Trust. For services to Children and Young People.
- Samuel Henry Cherry, Principal Officer, Invest NI, Department of Enterprise, Trade and Investment, Northern Ireland.
- Ms Alison Jill Chitty, Theatre Designer. For services to Drama.
- Joan, Mrs. Christie, M.B.E., chair, North Eastern Education and Library Board. For services to Libraries in Northern Ireland.
- Barry Clayman, Concert Promoter. For services to Entertainment and Charity.
- Roger Graham Coe-Salazar, Chief Crown Prosecutor, Gloucestershire Crown Prosecution Service.
- Lynda Margaret, Mrs. Collis, Implementation Manager, Child Support Agency.
- Gita, Mrs. Conn, J.P. For services to the Pro-Contact Greater Manchester Supervised Children's Contact and Assessment Centre.
- Ms Shirley Ida Conran, President, The Work Life Balance Trust. For services to Equal Opportunities.
- Alan Coombe, Director of Works, Commonwealth War Graves Commission.
- Jilly, Mrs. Cooper, Writer. For services to Literature.
- Nicholas Cooper, Business Relations Manager, Pharmaceuticals, Department of Trade and Industry.
- Captain Rex Andre Cooper. For services to the Royal Fleet Auxiliary Association.
- Philip Cotterill, Director, Kirklees Social Services Department. For services to Social Work in West Yorkshire.
- Oliver Croft, Founder and Director, British Darts Organisation. For services to Darts.
- Miss Victoria Crowe, Painter. For services to Art.
- Colonel Peter Edward Burgoyne Daniel, Retired Officer Principal, Ministry of Defence.
- Anne Deborah, Mrs. Darby, Substance Misuse Specialist Health Visitor, North East Lincolnshire. For services to the NHS.
- John Roderick Davidson, Director of Administration and Clerk of the council, University of London. For services to Higher Education.
- Geoffrey Davies, managing director, McConnel Ltd and Alamo Group (Europe) Ltd. For services to Agriculture and to the community in Ludlow, Shropshire.
- Lucienne, Mrs. Day, Textile Designer. For services to Design.
- Professor Caroline Dean, Associate Research Director, John Innes Centre, Norwich. For services to Plant Sciences.
- Pooran Desai, Director, Bioregional Development Group. For services to Sustainable Development.
- Robert Lawrence Doherty, lately Director of Investigations, Office of the Assembly Ombudsman, Northern Ireland.
- Professor Charles Peter Downes, Dean, Life Sciences Faculty, University of Dundee. For services to Life Sciences.
- Brian Duckworth, managing director, Severn Trent Water. For services to the Water Industry.
- Cecil Duckworth. For services to the community especially the Environment and Sport in Worcestershire.
- Peter John Edwards, lately Chief Superintendent, British Transport Police. For services to the Police.
- Dr.Victoria Edwards, lately Board Member Countryside Agency. For services to the Environment.
- Julian Garth Ellis, chair, Ellis Developments Ltd. For services to the Technical Textiles Industry and to the Welfare of Prisoners.
- John David Emmerson. For services to Publicly Funded Legal Services.
- Colonel Terrence Henry English. For services to the Royal British Legion.
- Philip Entwistle, Headteacher, St Bede's Catholic High School, Ormskirk, Lancashire. For services to Education.
- Peter Evans, Headteacher, Cardinal Newman Roman Catholic Secondary School, Hove, East Sussex. For services to Education.
- Margaret, Mrs. Fay, lately managing director, Tyne Tees Television. For services to Broadcasting.
- Ms Julie Anita Fleck, Access Officer, Greater London Authority. For services to Disabled People.
- Ms Sarah Louise Fowler, Secretary and Trustee, Shark Trust. For services to Marine Conservation.
- Roy Alexander Franklin, Chief Executive, Paladin Resources. For services to the UK Oil and Gas Industries.
- Major John William Garner, Chief Executive, KidsOut Charity. For services to Disadvantaged and Special Needs Children.
- George Gelber, Head, Public Policy Unit, Catholic Agency for Overseas Development.
- Robert Edward Bruce Gilbert, Chief Superintendent, Bloxwich Operational Command Unit. For services to Regeneration in the West Midlands.
- Ann Heron, Mrs. Gloag. For charitable services.
- Rabbi Dr. David Goldberg. For services to Inter-Faith Relations.
- Professor John Good, chair, Forestry Commission Wales Advisory Committee. For services to the Environment.
- Richard John Gregory, deputy chair, Yorkshire Forward. For services to the Yorkshire and Humber Region.
- Dr. Sunjai Gupta, Senior Medical Officer, Public Health Development and Health Inequalities Unit, Department of Health.
- Michael Geoffrey Minton Haines. For services to the community in Hackney, London.
- Frank William Hallett, lately Deputy Deliverer of the Vote (Production), House of Commons.
- Sir Stephen George Hammick Bt. D.L. For services to Health and the community in Dorset.
- Derek Sydney Hanson, Treasurer, International Youth Hostel Federation. For services to Youth Hostelling.
- Albert Harrison, managing director, Belfast International Airport. For services to Aviation.
- Edward Theodore Hartill. For services to the Corporation of London and to Surveying.
- Professor Christopher Haslett, Professor of Respiratory Medicine, University of Edinburgh. For services to Medica; Research.
- John Anthony Hassell, Headteacher, Glyne Gap Special School, Bexhill-on-Sea, East Sussex. For services to Special Needs Education.
- Hugh Hastie, Chief Executive, Derbyshire Connexions. For services to Young People.
- Dr. Kevin Howard Hawkins, Director-General, British Retail Consortium. For services to the Food Industry.
- Andrew Dudley Hayward, Divisional Veterinary Manager, State Veterinary Service, Carlisle.
- Eilish, Mrs. Henry, National Open Case Recovery Programme Manager, Inland Revenue.
- Edward William Valentine Holding, lately Honorary Treasurer, Girlguiding UK. For services to Young People.
- Kathleen Ann, Mrs. Holt, Governor, Springwood Nursery School, Bristol Cathedral School and Monkton Combe School, Bath. For services to Education.
- Andrew Richard Hooper, Grade 7, Crime Reduction and Community Safety Group, Home Office.
- Dr. Laurence Howard, J.P., Lord Lieutenant of Rutland. For services to the Administration of Justice.
- Dr. Sally Howes, Director General, Society of British Aerospace Companies. For services to the UK Space Industry.
- Leslie Mark Hughes, M.B.E. For services to Football.
- Cecil Raymond Humphery-Smith. For services to education in Genealogy and Heraldry.
- Ruth, Mrs. Hyde, Chief Executive, Oadby and Wigston Borough Council, Leicestershire. For services to Local Government.
- Ms Joyce Anita Hytner, Director, ActIV. For services to the Arts.
- Arthur Robert Ivatts, Department for Education and Skills and OFSTED Adviser on Gypsy and Traveller Children's Education. For services to Education.
- Carol Agnes, Mrs. Jackson, Headteacher, Kersland School, Renfrewshire. For services to Education in Scotland.
- Ronald Albert Victor Jacobs, lately Head, Specialist Schools Unit, School Diversity Division, Department for Education and Skills.
- David Jenkins, M.B.E., lately General Secretary, Wales TUC. For services to Industrial Relations.
- Peter Charles Jinman, Veterinary Surgeon and Member, Spongiform Encephalopathy Advisory Committee. For services to the Veterinary Profession.
- Professor Alexander Mackenzie Johnston, Member, Advisory Committee on the Microbiological Safety of Food. For services to Food Safety.
- John Walter Jones, Chief Executive, Welsh Language Board. For services to the Welsh Language.
- Dr. Robert Russell Jones, Medical Officer, HM Prison Swansea. For services to Healthcare.
- Angus John Kennedy, Chief Executive, Castle Vale Housing Action Trust. For services to Social Housing in Birmingham.
- George Anthony Key, Community Safety Officer, Rhondda Cynon TaV County Borough Council. For services to Local Government.
- Damian Killeen, Director, Scottish Human Services Trust. For services to Social Inclusion.
- David Selwyn Kissman, chair, Corporation of Broxtowe College, Nottingham. For services to Further Education.
- Professor John Frederick Knott, Member, Health and Safety Commission, Nuclear Safety Advisory Committee. For services to Nuclear Safety.
- Nicholas Christopher Kuenssberg, lately Member, Scottish Legal Aid Board. For services to the Scottish Legal Aid Board.
- Robert John Lane, Chief Executive, Corby Urban Regeneration Company. For services to Regeneration.
- Christopher John Law, managing director, Alfred McAlpine Slate Ltd. For services to the Slate Industry in Wales.
- Dr. Annette Lawson, lately Commissioner, Women's National Commission. For services to Diversity.
- Dr. David Howard Leech, Director, Programme Operations, Engineering and Physical Sciences Research Council. For services to Scientific Administration.
- Judith Margaret, Mrs.Lennard, Band G, Department for Constitutional Affairs.
- Patrick Leader Leonard, Member, Sussex Downs Conservation Board. For services to the Environment.
- John Henry James Lewis, chair, Wallace Collection. For services to the Arts.
- Professor Howell Arnold Lloyd, Deputy Vice-Chancellor, University of Hull. For services to Higher Education.
- Thomas Owen Saunders Lloyd, D.L., lately chair, Historic Buildings Council for Wales. For services to Heritage.
- Robert Mackenzie MacGillivray. For services to the Save the Children Charity Overseas.
- The Reverend Dr. Robert James (Roy) Magee, M.B.E. For public service.
- Dr. Timothy Clive Marrs, Chief Toxicologist, Food Standards Agency.
- Ms Margaret Anna Marsden, Director, Wiltshire and Swindon Community Foundation. For services to the community in Wiltshire.
- Patrick Joseph Martin, lately Chief Executive, Western Education and Library Board. For services to Education.
- Mary, Mrs. Martyn, Head, Seafarer Health and Safety Branch, Maritime and Coastguard Agency.
- Professor Anthony Dormer May, Professor of Transport Engineering and Director, Institute for Transport Studies, University of Leeds. For services to Transport Engineering.
- Daniel McDonald, Headteacher, St Joseph's Roman Catholic Primary School, Westminster, London. For services to Education.
- Professor Jean McIntosh, Director, Nursing and Midwifery Research Centre, Glasgow Caledonian University. For services to Healthcare.
- Sonia Irene, Mrs. Meaden, Director, South West Tourism. For services to Tourism in the South West.
- Philippa, Mrs. Miles, Area Director Service, Inland Revenue.
- Ms Elizabeth Millen, chair, Ulidia Housing Association Limited. For services to Social Housing in Northern Ireland.
- Nosheena, Mrs. Mobarik, Director, M Computer Technologies. For services to Business in Scotland.
- Martin John Molloy, lately President, Society of Chief Librarians and Director of Cultural and Community Services, Derbyshire County Council. For services to Libraries in Derbyshire.
- Dr. Sandra Elizabeth Mooney, Director, Health Services, British Airways. For services to Occupational Medicine.
- Andrew Morrow, lately Programme Director, intelligent customer Unit. For services to Libraries in Northern Ireland.
- Trevor Muir, Chief Executive, Midlothian Council. For services to Local Government in Scotland.
- Dr. Nayyar Naqvi, Consultant Cardiologist, Wrightington, Wigan and Leigh NHS Trust. For services to medicine.
- David John Nash, Sculptor. For services to Art.
- Jacob Rowan Nell, Grade 7, HM Treasury.
- Michael Alistair Newell, Governor, HM Prison Durham and President, Prison Governors' Association.
- Laura Beatrice, Mrs. Nuttall, D.L. For services to the community in Lancashire.
- Michael Laurence O’Neill, Director of Education, North Lanarkshire Council. For services to Education in Scotland.
- Ms Iyabode Lola Omolulu Tolulope Oni, Director, Brent Sickle Cell and Thalassaemia Centre, Central Middlesex Hospital. For services to the NHS.
- Oliver Page, Director, Major Retail Groups Division, Financial Services Authority. For services to Financial Regulation.
- Miss Susan Lesley Palmer, lately Trustee, National Heritage Memorial Fund and the Heritage Lottery Fund. For services to the National Heritage.
- Kanwar Jit Singh Panesar, Consultant Surgeon, Altnagelvin Area Hospital, Londonderry. For services to Medicine.
- Charles Julian Parker, Secretary, Nautical Institute. For services to the Maritime Industry.
- Colin Parry, chair, Tim Parry Jonathan Ball Trust. For services to Community Relations.
- Nainesh Patel, managing director, Frasan Ltd. For services to Exports.
- Stephen Michael Payne, lately Architect, Queen Mary 2 Cruise Liner. For services to the Shipping Industry.
- Robert Mark Perfect, Chief Executive, Youth Justice Board for England and Wales. For services to Youth Justice.
- Jack Petchey. For services to Young People in East London and Essex through the Jack Petchey Foundation.
- Keith Thomas Phillips, H.M. Inspector of Fire Services, Office of the Deputy Prime Minister.
- Linda, Mrs. Pollard, J.P. For services to the community in Bradford.
- Christopher Price, deputy director, Office for Civil Nuclear Security, Department of Trade and Industry.
- Susanne, Mrs. Prince, Member, Peak District Farm Holidays Association. For services to Tourism and Farming in East and West Midlands.
- Marilyn Margaret, Mrs. Raine, Headteacher, Ysgol Dinas Bran, Llangollen. For services to Education.
- Andrew Owen Earle Raven, Non Executive Director, Forestry Commission. For services to the Environment.
- Janet Yvonne, Mrs. Reed, National Manager, British Gas, Wales. For services to Economic Development in Wales.
- John Richard Rees, lately Chief Highway Engineer, National Assembly for Wales.
- Dr. Desmond Anthony Rice, Veterinary Surgeon and Nutritionist. For services to the Agri-Food Industry in Northern Ireland.
- Ian Richard, lately managing director, Cambridge Newspapers. For services to the Newspaper Industry.
- Miss Angela Rippon. For services to Broadcasting, the Arts and Charity.
- David Lloyd Carah Roberts, D.L., Member, Cornwall County Council. For services to Local Government.
- Martin Welch Roberts, lately Project Director, London Patients Choice. For services to the NHS.
- Professor Peter Roberts, Professor of Regional Planning, University of Liverpool. For services to Regeneration and to Urban and Regional Planning.
- Thomas Gerald Robson, Grade B2, Ministry of Defence.
- David Owen Rogers, Member, East Sussex County Council. For services to Local Government.
- Peter George Rogerson, deputy chair, Construction Industry Training Board. For services to the Construction Industry.
- Dr. Lesley Rushton, Member, Industrial Injuries Advisory Council. For services to Occupational Health.
- The Right Honourable John Francis Arthur, Lord St. Levan, D.S.C., D.L. For services to the community in Cornwall.
- Peter James Robert Sankey, Business Leader, AWE. For services to the Defence Industry.
- Dr. Bhadravati Subbraya Dwrakana Sastry, D.L., Past Vice President, Indian Medical Association. For services to Medicine in South Wales.
- Albert Schofield, Director, Mining Information and Coal Services, Coal Authority. For services to the Coal Industry.
- Paul Seddon. For services to the Industrial Rope Access Industry.
- Valerie Jane, Mrs. Sherred, Area Director, Inland Revenue Northern England, West Yorkshire and Craven Area.
- Professor Elizabeth Simpson, Professor and deputy director, Medical Research Council Clinical Sciences Centre. For services to Biomedical Research.
- Simon Bryham Simpson, chair, Simpson's Malt Ltd. For services to the Brewing Industry.
- Darra Singh, lately Chief Executive, Luton Council. For services to Local Government.
- John Phillip Bigger, 13th Lord of Woolmet. For services to the community, Service and Operations in the Global War on Terrorism.
- Satnam Singh, Technical Adviser, Inland Revenue.
- Dr. David Singleton, Head, Post Compulsory Education Division, Office for Standards in Education.
- Michael Bryan Smartt, lately Editor in Chief, BBC News Interactive. For services to Broadcasting.
- Carol Patricia, Mrs. Smith, lately Chief Executive, Careers Management (Futures) Ltd, East London. For services to Young People.
- Matt Smith, J.P., Scottish Secretary, UNISON. For services to the Trade Union Movement.
- Miss Dorothy Starkey, Court Manager, Bristol Crown Court, The Court Service.
- Wendy Maureen, Mrs. Start, M.B.E., D.L., chair, Nottinghamshire Probation Board. For services to the National Probation Service.
- Stelio Haralambos Stefanou, Chief Executive, Accord plc. For services to Business.
- Ms Judith Anne Stevenson, Headteacher, Robert Owen Early Years Centre, Greenwich, London. For services to Early Years Education.
- Timothy Edwin Paul Stevenson, Non-Executive Board Member, Department for Education and Skills. For services to Education.
- James Martin Stirling, Director, British Waterways Scotland. For services to Canals.
- Linda Jane, Mrs. Stone, J.P., Pharmacist. For services to the NHS in the West Midlands.
- Michael Anthony Street, Director, Customer Service and Operations, British Airways. For services to the Airline Industry.
- Paul Styles. For services to Broadcasting and to the Film Industry.
- Miss Frances Elizabeth Taylor, Superintending Inspector of Nuclear Installations, Department for Work and Pensions.
- Ms Pamela Taylor, Chief Executive, Water UK; President, European Union of National Associations of Water Suppliers and Waste Water Services. For services to the Water Industry.
- Peter Taylor, chair, Townhouse Company. For services to Tourism in Scotland.
- Ms Alison Thain, Chief Executive, Tees Valley Housing Group. For services to Social Housing.
- Edward William Thistlethwaite, Detective Inspector, Lancashire Constabulary. For services to the Police.
- Linda, Mrs. Thomas, Editor-in-Chief, Royal College of Nursing Publishing Company. For services to Nursing.
- Rita, Mrs. Thomas, chair, English Amateur Dance Sport Association. For services to Dance Sport.
- George William Faulds Thorley, lately Chief Executive, South Ayrshire Council. For services to Local Government in Scotland.
- Linda, Mrs Tomlinson, District Manager, Jobcentre Plus, Department for Work and Pensions.
- John Roy Trustram Eve, D.L. For services to the People's Dispensary for Sick Animals, Thames Valley Crime Stoppers and to other charities.
- Vidya Dhar Verma, Head, Animal Health and Welfare Directorate General, Finance Unit, Department for Environment, Food and Rural Affairs.
- William Arthur Vincent, lately District Judge. For services to the Administration of Justice..
- Professor Mohammed Wahab, Managing Director DELTA Microelectronics Ltd., and Professor of Electronic Engineering, University of Glamorgan. For services to Electronic Engineering.
- Kenneth Walsh, lately Headteacher, King Edward VII School, Melton Mowbray, Leicestershire. For services to Education.
- Professor Linda Ward, Director, Norah Fry Research Centre, University of Bristol. For services to Children and Disabled People.
- Bruce Welch, Musician and Songwriter. For services to Music.
- Dr. Peter Denton White, Consultant Psychiatrist and Head of Liaison Services, St. Bartholomew's Hospital, London. For services to Medical Education.
- Richard Graham White, Chief Inspector, Gaming Board For Great Britain.
- William Charles Stephen White. For public service.
- John Richard Whiteley, D.L., Presenter, Channel 4. For services to Broadcasting.
- Nicholas Williams, Grade B2, Ministry of Defence.
- Ian Wilson Williamson, lately Head, Investment and Performance, Communities Scotland, Scottish Executive.
- Paul Wilson, Director of Nursing, Lanarkshire Acute Hospitals NHS Trust. For services to Nursing.
- Patrick John Wintour, D.L., Director, Employability Forum. For services to Refugee Integration in the UK.
- David Wood, Writer, Playwright and Theatrical Producer. For services to Literature and Drama.
- Tamsin Sarah Ivy, Mrs. Woodeson, Deputy Head of VAT Operations, HM Customs and Excise.
- Alan Woods, Chief Executive, Environmental Campaigns. For services to Sustainable Development.
- Gillian, Mrs.Wright, lately Head of the Department for International Development, Zimbabwe.

==== Member of the Order of the British Empire (MBE) ====
Civil division

- Barbara Janet, Mrs. Adams, Headteacher, St. Peter's Primary School, Galashiels. For services to Education.
- Ian Day Adams, chair, Manor of Kennington Residents *Association. For services to Social Housing and to the community in Kennington, London.
- Michael Gilbert Adamson, managing director, Ramside Estates Group. For services to Hospitality and to Tourism in the North East.
- Dr. Anba Farhan-Ali, Director, Refugees in Jobs. For services to Community Relations.
- Rodney John Allam, Director of Technology, Air Products Ltd. For services to the Environment.
- Elizabeth, Mrs. Allan, Chief Registrar, City of Edinburgh Council. For services to Local Government.
- John Victor Allan. For services to Youth Justice in Camden, London.
- Isabella, Mrs. Anderson, lately School Crossing Warden, St. Kevin's Primary School, North Lanarkshire. For services to Education.
- Margaret Elizabeth, Mrs. Anderson, Volunteer Guide, Burrell Collection. For services to Museums in Scotland.
- Spiros Andreou, Caterer. For services to Hospitality in the Department of Health.
- David Archer, Assistant National Park Officer, Snowdonia National Park Authority. For services to the Environment in Wales.
- Simon David Archer. For services to Badminton.
- Arthur Michael Arnold. For services to the community in Ferndown, Dorset.
- Stuart Arnott. For services to the Boys' Brigade in Dunfermline, Fife.
- William Austin. For services to the Sea Cadet Corps in Conwy, Gwynedd.
- Brian Richard Ayres, Fitter, BAE Systems. For services to the Defence Industry.
- Pam Ayres, Poet and Entertainer. For services to Literature and Entertainment.
- David Andrew Bage. For services to the community in Lynsted, Kent.
- Rosemary Elizabeth, Mrs. Bailey, lately Manager, Cottage Nursery, Shrivenham, Wiltshire. For services to Education and to the Armed Forces.
- Geraldine, Mrs. Baird, co-founder and chair, Rutherglen and Cambuslang Housing Association. For services to the communities in Rutherglen and Cambuslang, Glasgow.
- Catherine Ann, Mrs. Baker, lately Head of Performing Arts (Music), Heanor Gate Science College, Derbyshire. For services to Education.
- Maureen, Mrs. Baker. For services to the community in Leeds, West Yorkshire.
- Peter Baker, Chair of Governors, St. Peter's High School, Gloucester. For services to Education.
- Richard Baker. For services to Hospitality and to Tourism in the South.
- Royden James Reginald Baker. For services to the community in Downham Market, Norfolk.
- Dr. George Barlow, General Medical Practitioner, Glasgow. For services to Healthcare.
- Gordon Barlow, Sergeant, Metropolitan Police Service. For services to the Police.
- Brian Douglas Barnes, Actor and Proprietor, One Man Theatre. For services to Drama.
- Andrew Crawford Barr, Network Co-ordination Manager, London Underground. For services to Transport.
- Frank Charles Barrett. For services to the Royal Air Forces Association in Lincoln.
- Leonard John Bartlett, Honorary Secretary, Chartered Management Institute, Cardiff Branch. For services to Management Development in Wales.
- Lakbir Singh Basran, managing director, Authentic Food Company. For services to the Food and Drink Industry.
- Philip Thomas Alexander Bateman, Corporate Affairs Director, Travel West Midlands. For services to Transport in the West Midlands.
- George Baxter. For services to the community in Farnham, Surrey.
- Donald Beerling. For services to the community in Canterbury.
- Adrian Carl Belcher, Grade C2, Ministry of Defence.
- Hugh Graham Belsey, Curator, Gainsborough's House, Suffolk. For services to Museums.
- Henry Bennett. For services to the community in Peterlee, County Durham.
- Robert Bevan. For charitable services.
- Rita Bocking, Mrs. Bicknell. For services to the community in Haslemere, Surrey.
- Stephen John Binns, Community Historian, Liverpool City Council. For services to Heritage.
- Alan John Birch, HM Inspector, HM Immigration Service.
- Adrian Paul Bishop, chair, Parish Council. For services to the community in Castle Combe, Wiltshire.
- William Blair, Executive Secretary, Institute of Auctioneers and Appraisers in Scotland. For services to the Agricultural Livestock Industry.
- Maurice Blake, chair, Surbiton Branch. For services to the Royal National Lifeboat Institution.
- Elizabeth Ann Hilda, Mrs. Bolton, lately Manager, Elizabeth Ashmore House Resource Centre. For services to Disabled Children in Bolton, Greater Manchester.
- Arthur Keith Bonham, D.L. For services to the community in Bristol.
- John Vincent Box, Substance Misuse Worker, HM Young Offenders' Institute Wetherby, West Yorkshire.
- Handa, Mrs. Bray, D.L. For services to the community in Shere, Surrey.
- William Thom Brentnall, Volunteer, Dalziel Day Hospice, Strathclyde Hospital, Motherwell, Lanarkshire. For services to Cancer Patients.
- Margaret Ann, Mrs. Brett, lately Higher Executive Officer, Office of Fair Trading.
- Peter Brindley, chair, Doncaster Strategic Partnership. For services to the community in Doncaster.
- John Andrew Brookes, Garden Designer. For services to Horticulture in the UK and Overseas.
- John Joseph Brookes. For services to the Royal British Legion.
- Margaret Ann, Mrs. Brookes, lately Grade D, Ministry of Defence.
- David Laurence Brown, Support Grade, Wildlife Unit, Department for Environment, Food and Rural Affairs.
- William Thomas Brown. For services to the community in Northern Ireland.
- Philip Maurice Bryers, Constable, West Mercia Constabulary. For services to the Police.
- Robert James Bucknell, Documentation Manager, Royal Mail. For services to the Royal Mail in London.
- Eleanor Margaret, Mrs. Bujalska, Fieldwork Manager, Kennet Childcare Team. For services to Children and Families in Wiltshire.
- David Watkin Bundock, Headteacher, Llandysul Primary School. For services to Education in Ceredigion.
- James Alan Burbridge, Caretaker, Perth College. For services to Education in Scotland.
- Michael Burchnall, Town Planner. For services to Town Planning in Liverpool.
- Lucy Fielding, Mrs. De Burgh. For services to the Save the Children Charity.
- Miss Agnes Burke, Administrative Officer, Customer Relationships Team, Office of Government Commerce.
- Miss Margaret Milne Burnett. For services to Counselling and to the Shalom House Trust Hospice in Pembrokeshire.
- Margaret Edith, Mrs. Burns, Member, Durham Voluntary Rangers. For services to Conservation in County Durham.
- Patricia, Mrs. Burry. For services to the community in Wexham, Buckinghamshire.
- Donald Ernest Burt, Electronic Record Project Adviser, Department for Constitutional Affairs.
- Charmaine Eileen, Mrs. Butler, Girl Guider. For services to Young People in Welwyn Garden City, Hertfordshire.
- George Washington Byfield, chair, Conniburrow Residents Association. For services to the community in Conniburrow, Milton Keynes, Buckinghamshire.
- Robert William Byth, Vice Chair, Scottish Enterprise Grampian. For services to Economic Development.
- Ann Priscilla, Mrs. Caffyn, President, Friends of Eastbourne Hospitals. For services to the community in Eastbourne.
- Joyce, Mrs. Gunn-Cairns, Artist. For services to Art.
- Doreen Rita Allison, Mrs. Campbell. For services to the community in Purfleet, Essex.
- Jackie Campbell. For services to Young People in Cummertrees, Annan, Dumfriesshire.
- Pauline, Mrs. Campbell, Cook, Harold Magnay School, Liverpool. For services to Education.
- Francis Carbutt. For services to the Elizabeth Finn Trust Charity and to the Voluntary Sector.
- Colette, Mrs. Cartwright, School Crossing Warden, Gwynedd Primary School, Flintshire. For services to Education.
- Ernest John Chapman, Member, North Cornwall District Council. For services to the community in Cornwall.
- Vanmali Gordhandas Charadva. For services to the Hindu Community in the UK.
- Sam Chau. For services to the Chinese Community and Race Relations in Glasgow.
- John Chelchowski. For public service.
- Patricia Anne, Mrs. Chesterton. For services to St. John Ambulance Brigade in Buckinghamshire.
- Miss June Christie, Principal Teacher, Logans Primary School, Motherwell. For services to Education.
- Mervyn Robert Clackett, Contract Manager, Brown Root and Marshall Aerospace. For services to the Ministry of Defence.
- Anne Patricia, Mrs. Clark. For services to Disadvantaged People through Oxfam and St Martins in the Fields, London.
- Miss Edith Barbara Clarke. For services to the community in Chippenham, Wiltshire.
- John Clarke. For services to the Monte Cassino Veterans Association.
- John Stanley Clarke, Data Acquisition Services Manager, Babcock Engineering Services Ltd. For services to the Defence Industry.
- Leslie Robert Clarke, Electrical Engineer, National Grid. For services to the Ministry of Defence.
- Vincent Marshall-Clarke, Crown Court Liaison OffIcer, Shropshire Probation Area. For services to the National Probation Service.
- Jeremy Clay. For charitable services to the Jordan Foundation in Herefordshire.
- Muriel Sally, Mrs. Clayton, lately chair, Ivybridge Estate Residents Association. For services to the community in Isleworth, Middlesex.
- Robert Wallace Cleland, Senior Maintenance Officer, Lothian and Borders Police. For services to the Police.
- Adrian Clements, Executive Officer, Child Support Agency.
- Miss Anna Mary Clyde. For services to the community and Rural Economy in Northern Ireland.
- Vivien Vera Elizabeth, Mrs. Coffey. For public service.
- Alan Cohen. For services to the London Taxi Drivers' Fund for Underprivileged Children.
- Harriet Allan, Mrs. Collins, lately chair, Multiple Sclerosis Society, Wigtown. For services to the community in Stranraer.
- Peter Raymond Collins, J.P. For services to the community in Blackpool.
- Ms Clare Joanne Connor. For services to Women's Cricket.
- William Cook, chair, Firthmoor Community Enterprise. For services to the community in Darlington.
- Dr Maureen Coombs, Consultant Nurse in Critical Care Nursing, Southampton University Hospitals NHS Trust. For services to the NHS.
- Joan, Mrs. Cordell, J.P. For services to the Victims of Crime and to the community in Swale, Kent.
- Ursula Joan, Mrs. Corker, chair, Carers UK Scotland Committee. For services to Carers.
- William Craddock. For services to the community in Washington, Tyne and Wear.
- John Frederick Halford Craven, Secretary, Emissions Trading Group. For services to Climate Control.
- Miss Doreen Crawford, Reader, Volunteer Reading Help Charity, Lewisham, London. For services to Education.
- Maureen, Mrs. Croom, Grade C1, Prime Minister's Office.
- John Aubrey Crozier, lately Personal Adviser, Shropshire, Telford and Wrekin Connexions Service. For services to Young People.
- George Calder Cruickshank. For services to the community in Turriff, Aberdeenshire.
- Christopher Culley, Assistant Scout Leader. For services to Young People in Bristol.
- William Cunningham, Laboratory Porter, Monklands Hospital, Lanarkshire. For services to the NHS in Scotland.
- Ernest Raymond Curtis. For services to Young People in Bristol.
- John Davenport, lately Caretaker, St. Paul's Church of England Primary School, Bury. For services to Education.
- John William Dossett-Davies, Member, National Council of the British Association of Social Work. For services to Children and Families.
- Mary Margaret, Mrs. Davies. For services to the community in Glossop, Derbyshire.
- Ronald James Davies, Auxiliary Coastguard. For services to the community in Borth, Wales.
- Vivienne Marguerite Ruth, Mrs. Davies. For services to Disabled People in London.
- Dafydd Caradog Davis, Forest Sports Development Adviser, Wales.
- Dorothy, Mrs. Daybell. For services to the community in Ashford in the Water, Derbyshire.
- Thomas Dennis Deane, chair, Ledbury Britain in Bloom Committee. For services to the community in Ledbury, Herefordshire.
- Christine Anne, Mrs. Dearman, Teacher and School Manager, John Mansfield School, Peterborough, Cambridgeshire. Forservices to Education.
- Edward Defty. For services to the community in Stanley, County Durham.
- Mohamed Faruk Desai. For services to Publicly Funded Legal Services.
- Ms Nirmla Devi, Smethwick Regeneration Manager, Sandwell Metropolitan Borough Council. For services to the community in Smethwick, West Midlands.
- John Matthew Devine, J.P. For services to the community in Strabane, County Tyrone.
- John Anthony Dickinson. For services to the Woolverstone Project and Disabled Sailing in East Anglia.
- Ms Caroline Diehl, Chief Executive, The Media Trust. For services to the Media.
- Norman Frederick Digance. For services to Financial Regulation.
- David Roger Dixon, Librarian, Ulster Folk and Transport Museum. For services to Museums.
- Ms Patricia Mary Dodoo. For services to the Ex-Service Fellowship Centres.
- Brian Douglas, lately Chargehand Driver, Ministry of Defence.
- Michael George Downs, J.P. For services to the Administration of Justice in South Wales.
- Peter John Downs, Group Customer Service Manager, West Midlands Group Valuation Office Agency, Inland Revenue.
- Phillip Downs, Founder, Manchester United Disabled Supporters Association. For services to Disabled People.
- Royston Arthur Dudley, Welfare Officer, National Association of Retired Officers (Peterborough Branch). For services to the Police.
- John Duncan, Chief Inspector, Grampian Police. For services to the Grampian Police Diced Cap Charitable Trust.
- Dr. Zoe Mary Dunhill, Director, School of Community Paediatrics, Edinburgh. For services to Medicine.
- Dr. Jack Dunnett, Potato Breeder. For services to the Potato Industry in Scotland.
- Maisie Geraldine, Mrs. Edie, Community Midwifery Manager, St. George's Healthcare NHS Trust, Tooting, London. For services to the NHS.
- Alice Patricia, Mrs. Edwards, lately District Nursing Sister. For services to the community in North Powys.
- Eric Edwards, Marshman, Broads Authority. For services to the Norfolk and SuffolkB roads.
- Miss Marilyn Edwards, Court Manager, Neath and Port Talbot County Court.
- Rosemary Ann, Mrs. Edwards, deputy chair, Citizens' Advice, and Volunteer, Citizens' Advice Bureau, Uckfield, East Sussex. For services to Consumers.
- Stephen Edwards, Detective Constable, Metropolitan Police Service. For services to the Police.
- Thomas Alfred Ellingford, lately Grade B, Department for Culture, Media and Sport.
- Dr. Bruce Eton. For services to the community in Hastings, East Sussex.
- Margaretta, Mrs. Falloon. For services to the community in Braniel and Castlereagh, Belfast.
- Miss Dorothy Fasey. For services to the Cheltenham and North Cotswolds Eye Therapy Trust.
- Samuel Field. For services to the communities in Kent and Dorset.
- David Fielding. For services to Aikido.
- Michael Fish, Broadcast Meteorologist, Meteorological Office.
- The Reverend Canon Sally Fogden. For services to Rural Affairs in East Anglia.
- Miss Phyllis Ann Foster, Grade C2, Ministry of Defence.
- Richard Hugh Frame, Director, Newport Action for Single Homeless. For services to the community in Newport, South Wales.
- Rosemary, Mrs. Frawley, lately Telematics Officer, Belfast Education and Library Board. For services to Libraries in Northern Ireland.
- Ms Edith Alexander Mary Freeman, Administrative Officer, Jobcentre Plus, Department for Work and Pensions.
- Lieutenant Colonel Robert Dennis French, Volunteer, Workers Educational Association, Winchester. For services to Adult Education.
- William Howard Frindall, cricket statistician. For services to Broadcasting and to Cricket.
- Vincent Fullam, chair, Ballynahinch Regeneration Ltd. For services to the community in Ballynahinch, Co Down.
- Ms Sandra Furby, Manager, Future Prospects, York. For services to Adult Learning.
- Brian Dominic Galbraith, T.D. For services to the community especially Health in Newbury, Berkshire.
- Miss Dorothy Gardiner. For services to the community in Swansea.
- Mother Mary Garson. For services to the Care of Others in Southern England and Overseas.
- Sydney George Garson. For services to the Sea Cadet Corps in Scarborough.
- Colonel Anthony Frank George, T.D., D.L. For services to the West Midlands Reserve Forces and Cadets Association.
- Karl George, Founding President, 100 Black Men of Birmingham and Founding Chair, African Caribbean Business Forum. For services to Young People in the West Midlands.
- Christopher Lawrence Gerard. For services to the community and to Charity in the Wirral, Merseyside.
- Onkar Singh Ghatore. For services to the community in Southall, London.
- Hadyn James Gigg. For services to the community in Preston, Lancashire.
- Jujhar Singh Gill, Member, Assessment and Qualifications Alliance, Punjabi Evaluation Committee. For services to Education.
- Keith Ginn. For services to the community in Greenwich, London.
- Ms Mary Angela Gittings, co-founder and Honorary Secretary, Wolverhampton Multi Handicap Care and Relief Service. For services to disabled people in the West Midlands.
- Arthur Roy Goddard. For services to Health and Education and to the community in Exeter, Devon.
- Dorothy, Mrs. Godfrey. For services to the community in Lichfield, Staffordshire.
- Sharon, Mrs. Golze, Principal Administrative Officer, Don Valley High School, Scawthorpe, Doncaster. For services to Education.
- Joanne, Mrs. Goode. For services to Badminton.
- Henry Thomas Knowles Graham. For services to the community in East Northamptonshire.
- Jefferson Graham, Section Officer, Lancashire Constabulary. For services to the Police.
- Brian Stuart Gray, lately Head, Careers Service and Head, Derbyshire Connexions Services. For services to Young People.
- Dr. Timothy John Gray, General Medical Practitioner, Rutland. For services to Healthcare.
- Vera, Mrs. Gray, Cook, Bugthorpe Church of England Primary School, North Yorkshire. For services to Education.
- Sybil Barbara, Mrs. Green, Head, Student Advisory Service, University of Wales, Cardiff. For services to Higher Education.
- Miss Alwena Griffith, Executive Officer, Caernarfon Animal Health Divisional Office, Department for Environment, Food and Rural Affairs.
- Frank Griffiths. For charitable services in North East Wales.
- Rona Dorothy, Mrs. Gunnell, Adult Literacy Officer, Dumfries and Galloway Council, Dumfries. For services to Adult Education.
- Ms Karen Hague, Campus Director, Paces High Green Centre, Sheffeld. For services to Families.
- Brian Hall. For services to Heritage in Burnley, Lancashire.
- Brian Hall. Usher, Grimsby Combined Court, The Court Service.
- Miss Madeline Margaret Hallendorff, Chief Executive, Royal College of Ophthalmologists. For services to Ophthalmology.
- David Hamilton. For public service.
- Robert Alexander Hamilton. For public service.
- Anthony John Hand. For services to disabled people.
- Edward Gordon Handley, J.P. For services to the community in Croydon, Surrey.
- Rosemary, Mrs. Handley. For services to Leicestershire and Rutland Hospice.
- Bessie, Mrs. Harding. For services to Epsom General Hospital, Surrey.
- Deirdre Patricia, Mrs. Harding, Manager, Northern Ireland Fish Producers Organisations. For services to the fishing industry.
- Gillian Hazel, Mrs. Hare, Founder and Leader, First Step Opportunity Group, London Borough of Havering. For services to children with special needs.
- Keith Arthur Harlock. Plant Manager, Granox Ltd. For services to the Rendering Industry.
- Valerie, Mrs. Harlow. Grade C, Ministry of Defence. Janet, Mrs. Harrigan. For services to the Protection of Swans and other River Birds in Worcestershire.
- Bernard Bromley Harris, managing director, Wynnstay Farmers. For services to Welsh Agricultural Business and to Young People in Meifod, Powys.
- Kathleen Mary, Mrs. Harrison, Manager, Philharmonic Court Student Residences, University of Liverpool. For services to Higher Education.
- Mark Harrison, Sergeant, Bedfordshire Police. For services to the Police.
- Professor Richard Anthony Harrison. For services to Solar Research.
- Frank Hart, lately Chief Clerk, Judicial Committee, Privy Council Office.
- Heather Dorice, Mrs. Hawker. For services to the community in Surrey.
- Michael Hay. For services to curling.
- Florence Amy, Mrs. Heaven. For services to the Soldiers', Sailors' and Airmens's Association in Gwet, South Wales.
- John Dawber Henson. For services to the Diocese of Southwark.
- Cora, Mrs. Heptonstall. For services to the community in Howden, East Riding of Yorkshire.
- Judith, Mrs. Heywood, Higher Executive Officer, The Pension Service.
- Frank Louis Hick, vice-president, Railway Convalescent Homes. For services to the Railway Industry.
- Geoffrey Hill. For charitable services in Stourbridge, West Midlands.
- Miss Jacqueline Hill, Administrative Support, Energy Markets Unit, Department of Trade and Industry.
- Owen Richard Hillier. For services to the communities in Nunney and Frome, Somerset.
- Charles William Hills. For services to the Six Circle Group in Scotland.
- Beryl Grace, Mrs. Hitch, Honours Secretary, Private Office, Department for Education and Skills.
- Stanley David Hitt. For services to Horticulture in Bath.
- Andrew Stephen Hoad T.D., Grade C1, Ministry of Defence.
- William Anthony Barnard Hobbs. For services to the community in Henley-on-Thames, Oxfordshire.
- Audrey, Mrs. Hodgson, chair, Meersbrook Residents and Tenants Association. For services to the community in Meersbrook, Sheffield.
- Bernard Holden. For services to the community in Accrington, Lancashire.
- Frances Audrey, Mrs. Hollis, Chair of Governors, Bishopsford Community School, Merton, London. For services to Education.
- Brian Douglas Hooper, Water Conservation Manager, South West Water. For services to the Water Industry.
- Janet Sealy, Mrs. Hopton. For the services to the communities in Nether and Upper Poppleton, York.
- Miss Elizabeth Hughes. For services to the community in Ilkley, West Yorkshire and to Soroptimist International.
- John Alexander (Rex) Humphrey, Farmer. For Services to Organic Farming in Northern Ireland.
- Gareth Humphreys, Human Resources Adviser, MBDA UK. For services to the Defence Industry.
- Ruth Elaine, Mrs. Hunt, Head, Technical Services Medical Research Council Clinical Sciences Centre. For services to Science.
- Linda Jeanne, Mrs. Husband. For services to Victims of Crime in St Austell, Cornwall.
- Elizabeth Julia, Mrs. Ingram, lately Chief Executive, Peterborough Diocesan Family Care, Cambridgeshire. For services to Families.
- Jean, Mrs. Innes, Foster Parent. For services to Foster Care in East Lothian.
- Afzal Iqbal, Community Development Officer, Greater Manchester Police. For services to the Police.
- George Peter Irwin, Joiner, Environment and Heritage Service, Department of the Environment, Northern Ireland.
- Edmond Isaac, Customer Service Officer, Leicester Station, Midland Mainline Ltd. For services to the Rail Industry.
- Mohammed Issa, Director, Tayside Equality Council. For services to Race Equality in Scotland.
- Donald Alexander Jack, Logistic Applications Group Manager, EDS. For services to the Ministry of Defence.
- Ms Cassandra Jackman. For services to Squash.
- Maureen, Mrs. Jackson, Treasurer, Dalton Tenants and Residents Association. For services to the community in Dalton, Huddersfield.
- Sandra Jane, Mrs. Jackson. For services to the community in Ollerton, Nottinghamshire.
- David James. For services to Sailing and to the Disabled in East Kent.
- Arthur George Jarmy, Volunteer Warden, Warley Place. Foe services to Conservation and to the community in Essex.
- Joyce Evelyn, Mrs. Jarvis. For services to Bowls for Visually Impaired People.
- Julian Richard Jeffery, Powerlifter. For services to Disabled Sports.
- David Vaughan Jenkins. For public service in Alderney.
- Cathleen Mary, Mrs. Jennings. For services to Conservation and to St.John Ambulance Brigade in Worcestershire.
- Derek William Arthur Johnson, J.P. For services to Business and to the community in Barking, Essex.
- Miss Wendy Diana Margaret Johnson, Vice-chair, Institute for Outdoor Learning. For services to Young People.
- Eileen, Mrs. Johnston, Home Help, Homefirst Health and Social Services Trust. For services to Elderly People in Northern Ireland and to Children Overseas.
- Allan George Jones, lately Higher Executive Officer, JobcentrePlus, Department for Work and Pensions.
- Major David Andrew Jones, J.P. For services to Young People and to the community in the West Midlands.
- Dr. Malcolm Jones, Scientist, AWE. For services to the Defence Industry.
- Patricia, Mrs. Jones, Production Manager, IrvinGQ. For services to the Defence Industry.
- Stewart David Jones, Grade C1, Ministry of Defence.
- Tanya, Mrs. Jones, Secretary, Pontlanfraith Netball Club. For services to the community in Pontlanfraith, South Wales.
- Ann, Mrs. Wille-Jorgensen, Grade E1, Ministry of Defence.
- David Arthur Judge. For services to Rotary International, Scouting Worldwide, and to the community in Essex.
- Michael Joseph Kearney. For services to the Royal Irish Fusiliers Old Comrades Association.
- Ms Evelyn Kemp, Member, North East Housing Board and Secretary, North East Council of Tenants and Residents. For services to Housing.
- Paul Michael Keogh, Head of Languages, King James School, Knaresborough, North Yorkshire. For services to Education.
- Jawaid Khaliq, Boxer. For services to Boxing.
- Amtul Salam, Mrs. Khan, chair, Al-Nisa Association, Northern Ireland. For services to Muslim Women in Northern Ireland.
- Saleh Ahmed Khan. For services to Community Development in Bangladesh..
- John Reginald Kitson. For services to Blind People through Link-Up in Thetford, Norfolk.
- Miss Catherine Ann Kittredge, Assistant Head Teacher and Head of Lower School, Nower Hill High School, Pinner, London. For services to Education.
- Dr. Michael Alan Knight, Medical Adviser, Suffolk Constabulary. For services to the Police.
- Robert Andrew Knight, Senior Grounds Manager, London Borough of Bexley Council. For services to Local Government.
- John Richard Knowles, Widening Participation Co-ordinator, University of Lincoln. For services to Higher Education.
- Joyce, Mrs. Knowles, lately Nurse, Continuing Care, Gwent Health Authority. For services to Nursing.
- Colin Robert Knowlson. For services to the community in Abergele, North Wales.
- Ralph David Kramer, executive director, Youth Enquiry Service (Plymouth) Ltd. For services to Young People in Plymouth.
- Alistair Kenneth Gordon Lamont, chair, Scottish Centre for the Chartered Institution of Wastes. For services to Sustainable Waste Management.
- Raymond Thomas Lancaster. For services to the Royal British Legion.
- Joan Margaret, Mrs. Lane, Audio-Visual Manager, National Gallery. For services to Art.
- George William Ward Laverton. For services to the Rufiji Leprosy Trust in Tanzania.
- Dr. John Raymond Lawrence, Member, Water Voice Southern. For services to the Water Industry.
- Ms Hilary Lawson, Community Learning Manager, Workers' Educational Association. For services to Education in Inverness and in the North Highlands.
- Raymond Barry Leach, Constable, Metropolitan Police Service. For services to the Police.
- Bryan William Leaker. For services to the community in Minehead, Somerset.
- Linda, Mrs. Lefevre, Business Environment Support Officer and Area Fleet Manager, Inland Revenue.
- Jane, Mrs. Lemon. For services to Ecclesiastical Embroidery.
- Joan, Mrs. Levitt. For services to the community in Leek, Staffordshire.
- Patricia Mary, Mrs. Lewis, J.P. For charitable services in South East Wales.
- Tyze Kai Tai Li, Technology Manager, Highways Agency.
- Anthony Phillip Lines, J.P. For services to the community in Thornbury, Bristol.
- Ms Lynn Llewellyn, lately Inspector, North Wales Police. For services to the Police.
- Joyce Margaret, Mrs. Lock, Member, Parent Teacher Association, The Meadows School, Bristol. For services to Education.
- Norma, Mrs. Lockhart, Science Teacher, Southfield Technology College, Workington, Cumbria. For services to Education.
- Kathleen, Mrs. Lopez, Operations Manager, HM Customs and Excise.
- Mair, Mrs. Lovell. For services to the Macmillan Association in South Wales.
- Peter Lugton, lately Ministerial Correspondence Administrator, Scottish Executive.
- Charles James Lukeman, Network Services Technician, Thames Water. For services to the Water Industry.
- Penelope, Mrs.Lumley. For services to Real Tennis.
- Gladys, Mrs. Lunn. For services to the Soldiers', Sailors' and Airmen's Families Association in Northamptonshire.
- Dr. Robert William Lyle. For services to Young People and to the community in Prestbury, Gloucestershire.
- Raymond William Mabire. For services to Young People in Guernsey.
- Dr. Jean Audrey Macheath. For services to the community in Suffolk.
- Elizabeth Kay, Mrs. Mack, School Secretary, Tranent Primary School, East Lothian. For services to Education in Scotland.
- Jack MacKay. For services to Neighbourhood Watch and to the community in South Yorkshire.
- William Woodhouse Madders, Council Member, National Farmers Union. For services to Dairy Farming.
- Priscilla, Mrs. Makinson. For services to the community in St. Helen Auckland, County Durham.
- Ms Adeeba Malik, Deputy Chief Executive, QED UK. For services to Community Relations and to Business in Bradford, West Yorkshire.
- Anne Erica, Mrs. Mansell, Co-ordinator, Waverley Winterwatch Project. For services to Homeless People in South West Surrey.
- Frederick Marhoff. For services to HM Prison Belmarsh, Thamesmead, London.
- Joyce, Mrs. Marhoff. For services to HM Prison Belmarsh, Thamesmead, London.
- David Rainsbury Martin, Head of Mathematics, City of London School. For services to Education.
- Derek Arthur Martin, Youth Worker, Pettits Youth Club, Havering, London. For services to Young People.
- Dr. Michael Vernon Martin, Senior Lecturer and Honorary Consultant, Oral Microbiology, University of Liverpool. For services to Dentistry.
- Henry Francis Mason, Deputy Principal, Qualifications and Learning Policy Branch, Department for Employment and Learning, Northern Ireland.
- Mohammed Abdul Matin, Governor, Tower Hamlets College and chair, Keen Students Supplementary School. For services to Education.
- Sheila, Mrs. Matson. For services to Elderly Disabled People in Desford, Leicestershire.
- Gillian Ida Vivienne, Mrs. Matthews, Founder, Hermes Sports Club, North Dorset Leisure Centre, Gillingham, Dorset. For services to Disabled Sport.
- Hilary Jocelyn, Mrs. May. For services to the community in Minehead, Somerset.
- Alan Henry Maynard, chair, Hawkenbury Allotment Holders' Association. For services to the community in Tunbridge Wells, Kent.
- Elizabeth, Mrs. McAllister. For services to the Citizens' Advice Bureau, Motherwell and Wishaw.
- Ms Ann-Marie McCarthy, Founder Member, Rainbow Project, Southampton. For services to Homeless Young People.
- Linda, Mrs. McCarthy, Teaching Assistant Manager, Newark Orchard School, Newark, Nottinghamshire. For services to Special Needs Education.
- Thomas Godfrey McCluskie. For services to the Titanic and to Maritime History.
- John McDermott, Coach. For services to Boxing in Scotland.
- Moira, Mrs. McGee, Founding Member, Women in Enterprise. For services to Business in Northern Ireland.
- Barbara McGuire. For services to Opera in Mid Wales.
- Ian Robert McNeil, J.P., lately Member, Legal Services Consultative Panel. For services to the Legal System.
- Colin Anthony McPhail, chair, Dalgety Bay and Hillend Community Council. For services to the community in Dalgety Bay, Fife.
- William McSporran, chair, Isle of Gigha Heritage Trust. For services to the community in Gigha, Argyll.
- Peter George Meacham, Fitter and Turner, Ministry of Defence.
- Hector Phiroze Medora, Head of Disability Services, Disability. For services to Disabled People in Kensington and Chelsea, London.
- Raghbir Mhajan. For services to Tennis.
- Raja Miah, lately Member, Community Cohesion Panel. For services to Community Relations in Greater Manchester.
- Herbert Andrew Millar, Divisional Superintendent. For services to the St John Ambulance Brigade in Northern Ireland.
- Dr. Paul Malcolm Ronald Millard, chair, Newbury and District Cancer Care Trust. For services to People with Cancer.
- Brian Jeffrey Miller. For services to the St. Giles Estate and to the community in Lincoln.
- Miss Mary Stewart Moncur. For services to the community in Corstorphine, Edinburgh.
- Margaret Elizabeth, Mrs. Monticelli, Support Grade, Facilities Management Services, Commercial Services Division, Department for Education and Skills.
- George Smyth Moore, chair, Orchardville Society. For services to Disabled People in Northern Ireland.
- Grace Fowler, Mrs. Moore, Director of Health Improvement, Ayrshire and Arran NHS Board. For services to Healthcare.
- Marjorie Gladys, Mrs. Moore. For services to Guy's Hospital, London.
- Valerie, Mrs.Morgan, Volunteer and Chair Nottinghamshire Victim Support Service. For services to Victim Support.
- Philip Edward Morris, chair, British Heart Foundation, Harrogate Branch. For services to People with Heart Disease in Harrogate.
- Kenneth Mortimer, Customer Relations Manager, Inland Revenue.
- Pamela Doreen, Mrs. Moseling, Leader, Anchor Boys, 2nd West Kent Company, Boys' Brigade. For services to Young People.
- Miss Gladys Mude. For services to Southend Hospital, Southend-on-Sea, Essex.
- Anne, Mrs. Mulhern, Proprietor, Willow Tearooms. For services to Tourism in Glasgow.
- Alfred William Mullin. For services to Unemployed and Disadvantaged People in the Wirral, Merseyside.
- Charles Roy Mullins. For services to the community in Woolacombe and Mortehoe, Devon.
- Donald Derek Barry Harold Munns, Pollution Officer. For services to the Environment in the United Kingdom and Europe.
- Ms Joanna Lucy Maria Munro, Member, Blackpool Youth Offending Team. For services to Young People in Lancashire.
- Amelia Ann, Mrs Murphy. For services to the community in Knowsley and Liverpool.
- Iain McGregor Murray. For services to Health and Safety.
- Khandaker Abdul Musabbir, chair, Bangladesh Association and Community Project. For services to Community Relations in Rochdale, Greater Manchester.
- Mohammed Miskin Nasim, Councillor, London Borough of Waltham Forest. For services to Local Government.
- The Reverend Canon James Edward McKenzie Neale. For services to the community in Nottingham.
- Lancelot Donald Nelson, Manager, North Handsworth Practical Care Project. For services to the community in Birmingham.
- Keith Newbery, Executive Editor, Observer Group of Newspapers, West Sussex. For services to Journalism.
- Dorothy Adelaide, Mrs. Newbury, vice-president, Hendon and District Archaeology Society. For services to Archaeology in North London.
- Charles Burton Newlands, J.P. For services to the community in Renfrew.
- Ms Dorka Dorota Malgorzata Nieradzik, Make-up, Hair and Prosthetics Artist. For services to Drama.
- Lynda Margaret, Mrs. Nolan, Children Services Manager, Barnardo's Chorley Families, Lancashire. For services to Children and Families.
- Kenneth Nutty. For services to the community in St. Albans, Hertfordshire.
- Brigadier Donogh Declan O’Brien. For services to the Officers' Association.
- The Reverend Ian Douglas Ogilvie. For services to the Fishermen's Mission and to the Voluntary Service.
- Byron George Owen, J.P. For services to Local Government and to the community in Swansea.
- David Eric Palmer, Chief Superintendent, Thames Valley Police. For services to the Police Superintendents' Association of England and Wales.
- Kailash, Mrs. Parekh, J.P.. For services to Community Relations and Race Equality in Preston, Lancashire.
- Raymond John Parker. For services to the DeLuda Society and to the community in Cottingham, East Riding of Yorkshire.
- Samuel Richard Parkes, Pipe Major, Field Marshal Montgomery Pipe Band. For services to Pipe Band Music in Northern Ireland.
- Jean Mercia May, Mrs. Parratt. For services to the community in Farnham, Surrey.
- Christopher David Parsons, Sub-Officer in Charge (Retained), Hereford and Worcester Fire Brigade. For services to the Fire Service and to the community in Pershore, Worcestershire.
- Dr. Rashmi Patel, General Dental Practitioner and Member, Standing Dental Advisory Committee. For services to Dentistry and Charity.
- Paul David Patterson, chair, Jersey Sports Association for the Disabled. For services to Sport for Disabled People in Jersey.
- Nicholas James Paul, Probation Officer, London Probation Area (Newham). For services to the National Probation Service.
- Mary, Mrs. Payne, Gardening Consultant and Lecturer. For services to Horticulture in the South West.
- Michael John Pengelly, J.P., D.L. For services to the community in West Dorset.
- Rosemary Vivien, Mrs. Penn. For Public and Charitable Services in the Isle of Man.
- Miss Alison Perman, Detective Constable, City of London Police. For services to the Police in the UK and Overseas.
- Elizabeth, Mrs. Petersen. For services to people with Muscular Dystrophy in Cumbernauld and Kilsyth.
- Victoria Betsy Gordon, Mrs. Petley. For services to Chichester Cathedral and to Macmillan Cancer Relief.
- Conrad Neil Phoenix. For services to Health and Education and to the community in Letchworth, Hertfordshire.
- Ms Christine Pickthall, chair, Cheshire Disabilities Federation. For services to Disabled People in Cheshire.
- Eileen Catherine, Mrs. Pike. For services to the Royal Air Forces Association in Hertfordshire.
- Miss Theodolina Pinto, Senior Executive Officer, Office of Government Commerce.
- Charlotte Ann, Mrs. Piper, Senior Executive Officer, The Pension Service.
- The Reverend Michael Edward Plunkett. For services to the community in Speke, Liverpool.
- Susan Mary, Mrs. Poole, Enquiry Centre Adviser, Inland Revenue.
- Gregory Poon. For services to Nursing and Racial Equality in Grampian.
- Richard William Postlethwaite, Geography Teacher, Redborne Upper School and Community College, Ampthill, Bedfordshire. For services to Education.
- Basil George Potter. For services to Homeless People and to charity in London.
- Kenneth Frank Pottle. For services to Neighbourhood Watch in Dorset.
- Sandra Patricia, Mrs. Boulton-Pratt, Head, Prisoner Management Unit, HM Prison Wandsworth, London.
- Brenda Margaret, Mrs. Prescott. For services to Swimming and Disabled Sport.
- Stanley Charles Pretty, Director, Amersham Martyrs Community Play. For services to Drama and to the community in Amersham, Buckinghamshire.
- Alun John Price, lately Company Accounts Investigator, Inland Revenue.
- Derrick Geoffrey Price, lately Mayor, Knighton Town Council and Town Crier of Knighton. For services to the community in Knighton, Powys.
- Councillor Peter Price, Member, Sheffield City Council and chair, Yorkshire Sports Board. For services to the community in Sheffield.
- Norman Prophett, Director, Caratrans Ltd. For services to the Environment.
- Frank Vincent Pugh. For services to the Sea Cadet Corps in Ellesmere Port and the Wirral District, Cheshire.
- Charles Purvis, Ranger, Risley Moss Country Park. For services to Conservation in Cheshire.
- Yvonne, Mrs.Pye. For services to the community in Brightlingsea, Essex.
- Jamila, Mrs. Qureshi. For services to the Asian Community in Coventry.
- Graham Raines, Helmsman. For services to the Royal National Lifeboat Institution, Hayling Island, Hampshire.
- John William Raynor. For services to the Royal British Legion in Nottinghamshire.
- Charles Eric Reaney. For services to Young People and to the community in Oldbury, West Midlands.
- Pamela Joyce, Mrs. Reeve, General Manager, Orders of St. John Care Trust. For services to the community in Lincoln.
- Beryl Eileen, Mrs. Rham. For services to Hinchingbrooke Hospital in Huntingdon, Cambridgeshire.
- Francis Stephen Rhys, Founder and Conductor, Putney Choral Society] and the City Philharmonic Choir. For services to Music.
- Leighton Edward Rich, Teacher and Director, Hampshire County Youth Band. For services to Music.
- Sarah, Mrs. Richards, Councillor, Torfaen County Borough Council. For services to the community in Torfaen, South Wales.
- Joseph John Richardson, Leader, East Northamptonshire Council. For services to Local Government.
- Miss Wendy Rider. For services to the community in Bedford.
- Miss Nora Rimmer, Secretary and Treasurer, Runcorn Residents Federation. For services to Social Housing in Runcorn.
- Ian Ripley, Regional Finance Manager, Anglian Region, Environment Agency. For services to the Environment.
- Anne Grace, Mrs. Rivett, managing director, W.B. Bawn and Co Ltd. For services to Business in East Anglia.
- Mohamed Salim Ali Riyami. For services to the NHS.
- Archibald Robb, lately Commissioner, Mental Welfare Commission for Scotland. For services to the community in Scotland.
- Edwin Ernest Roberts, Sub Postmaster. For services to the Royal Mail and to the community in the Medway Towns, Kent.
- Gwendoline Margaret, Mrs. Robinson. For services to the community in Southmead, Bristol.
- Michael William Robinson, Support Sector Officer, Western Area, Suffolk Special Constabulary. For services to the Police.
- Peter Ewart Robinson. For services to the Guide Dogs for the Blind Association in Bolton, Greater Manchester.
- Minnie, Mrs. Robson. For services to the community in Kibblesworth, Tyne and Wear.
- Marie Therese, Mrs. Roe. For services to Victims of Crime in Lancashire.
- Miss Monica Rooney, Teacher, Physical Education, St. Julie's Catholic High School. For services to Education.
- John Swanson Rosie, J.P. For services to the community in the Highlands.
- Rosemary Alice, Mrs. Ross, J.P. For services to the community in Findern, Derbyshire.
- Michael David Rowe, J.P. For services to the Citizens' Advice Bureau, Malling, Kent.
- John Alfred Rowles, Caretaker, Hathaway Primary School, Ealing, London. For services to Education.
- John Mervyn Russell. For services to the community in Farrington Gurney, Somerset.
- John Rutter, chair, Wallasey Voluntary Transport for the Blind. For services to the community in Wallasey, Merseyside.
- Ms Kathryn Marie Salt. For services to the community in Amber Valley, Derbyshire.
- Professor Stephen Hugh Salter F.R.S., Professor of Engineering Design, University of Edinburgh. For services to Engineering.
- John Michell Sampson. For services to the communities in West Cross, Mumbles and Swansea.
- Anthony Sandar. For services to the community in Derby.
- Ms Rebecca Sandifer, Senior Personal Secretary, Metropolitan Police Service. For services to the Police.
- Henry Arthur Sargent. For services to Music and to the community in Hertford.
- Ms Susan Christine Saunders, Senior Assistant College Secretary, King's College, London. For services to Higher Education.
- Richard Charles Sawtell, D.L. For services to Disabled People.
- Graham David Scholey, Conservation Team Leader. For services to the Environment.
- Audrey Grace, Mrs. Scott, lately Nurse, Royal Military Police Training School.
- Clyde Everton Sealey, Staff Counsellor, Counselling and Support Services, Office of the Deputy Prime Minister.
- Christine Mary, Mrs. Searle, chair, Poplar Housing and Regeneration Community Association. For services to the community in Tower Hamlets, London.
- Margaret Louise, Mrs. Sedwell, Finance Manager, Wimbledon School of Art, London. For services to Higher Education.
- Kuldeep, Mrs. Seehra, Customer Service Adviser, Inland Revenue.
- Ian Malcolm Serjent, Marine and Technical Services Director, James Fisher and Sons plc. For services to the Shipping Industry.
- Donald Sidney Sharp, Company Captain and Vice- President, Wolverhampton Battalion of the Boys' Brigade. For services to Young People.
- Dr. John Clifford Sheldon. For services to Biodiversity in Scotland.
- Audrey Margaret, Mrs. Shell. For services to the Royal Air Forces Association.
- Anne, Mrs.Short. For services to the community in Cromarty, Ross-shire.
- Peter Robin Siddall, chair, Siddall and Hilton Group of Companies. For services to the Medical Industry in the North East.
- Robert Simpson, Founder, The Rockvale Rebound. For services to Talking Newspapers in Scotland.
- Miss Dawn Skelton, Administrative Assistant, Child Support Agency.
- James Skelton. For services to the Royal Air Forces Association in Glasgow.
- Allan Smith, Chief Executive, The Channel Islands Co-operative Society. For services to the community in Jersey and to Charities Overseas.
- Allen Smith, Support Grade, HM Immigration Service.
- Keith Glenville Smith. For services to Sport and to the community in Newport, Shropshire.
- Dr. Peter Claude Lindsay Smith, lately Science Sector Head, Engineering and Physical Sciences Research Council. For services to Scientific Administration.
- Dr. Vincent Jervis Smith, Reader in Physics, University of Bristol. For services to Physics.
- Robert (Roy) Smyth, Photographer. For services to Photographic Journalism.
- William Snaith. For services to Horse Racing and to the community in Newmarket, Suffolk.
- Ian Derek Snow. For services to the community in Bonchurch, Isle of Wight.
- Maureen, Mrs. Southern. For services to the community in Felling, Gateshead.
- Peggy Anne, Mrs. Spaight, deputy chair, Disability Living Allowance Board and Therapy Services Manager. For services to the NHS.
- Bernadette, Mrs. Speedy, Head, Export Documentation, Chamber Business Enterprises. For services to Exporters.
- Huntly Gordon Spence. For services to Disadvantaged Young People and to the community in Camden, London.
- Harrison Rowland Spencer. For services to Yacht Rigging and Sailing in Cowes, Isle of Wight and Worldwide.
- Elaine, Mrs. Spratling, Town Councillor. For services to the community in Earley, Reading.
- Neville Wesley Springer, lately Director, Leicester Caribbean Business Association. For services to Business in the East Midlands.
- Miss Rosemary Squires. For services to Music and Charity.
- The Reverend Barbara Mary Stanford. For services to the community in Bloomsbury, London.
- Jennifer Maureen, Mrs. Stewart. For services to the community in Randalstown, Northern Ireland.
- Peggy, Mrs. Stewart. For charitable services through Quilting in Cornwall.
- Dennis Stinchcombe, Project Manager, SPICES Neighbourhood Support Funded Project, Bristol. For services to Young People.
- Dolores Elizabeth Josephine, Mrs. Stinson, Teacher, Armagh College of Further Education. For services to Further Education and to the community in Armagh, NorthernIreland.
- John Henry Stokes, B.E.M., co-founder and chair, Taste for Adventure Project, Hereford. For services to Young People.
- Roland Stork, lately Coxswain. For services to the Royal National Lifeboat Institution, Bridlington.
- Joan Muriel, Mrs. Stotesbury. For services to the Avon County Federation of Women's Institutes.
- Ivan Edmund Street, Volunteer, Springfield Junior School, Swadlincote, Derbyshire. For services to Education.
- Catherine Margaret, Mrs. Stuart. For services to the community in Pontypridd, Rhondda Cynon Taff.
- John Suffield, Executive Member, Support After Murder and Manslaughter. For services to Victims of Crime.
- Michael Anthony Sutcliffe. For services to Motor Heritage.
- Robert Walker Swain. For services to Scouting in Duffield and to Mountain Rescue in Derbyshire.
- Mavis Hume, Mrs. Sweetingham, lately Show Manager, Chelsea Flower Show. For services to Horticulture.
- Harold Swift. For services to Amateur Rugby League in St. Helens, Lancashire.
- Ms Judith Swift, National Development Officer, Learning Services, TUC. For services to Adult Basic Skills.
- Hilda, Mrs.Swinney, Journalist, Dorset Echo. For services to Journalism and to Charity.
- Brian Thomas Tannerhill, Chief Executive, McSence Ltd. For services to the communities in Mayfield and Easthouse, Midlothian.
- Ernest Peter Thomas. For services to Sport.
- Dr. Eileen Norah Thompson, chair, LATCH Charity. For services to Children with Cancer in Wales.
- Margaret, Mrs. Thompson, chair, Aikman Avenue Tenants and Residents Association. For services to Housing in Leicester.
- Shirley Anne, Mrs. Thompson, Volunteer Batworker. For services to Bat Conservation in Kent.
- Iris Margaret, Mrs. Thorogood. For services to the War Widows' Association.
- John Thorpe, Journalist, Yorkshire Evening Post. For services to Journalism and to Charity.
- Michael Fong To. For services to the Chinese Community in Fife.
- Ms Jill Tookey, Founder and artistic director, National Youth Ballet of Great Britain. For services to Dance.
- Ms Linda Carol Totton, Personal Secretary, HM Prison and Young Offenders' Institute, Hockley, Essex.
- Miss Brenda Traylen T.D., lately Constable, Dorset Police. For services to the Police.
- Councillor Edward Trevor. For services to the community in Sutton, Surrey.
- James Truscott, Senior Road Safety Officer, North Lanarkshire Council. For services to Local Government.
- Janet Mary, Mrs. Turner. For services to the community in South Milton, Devon.
- Margaret Evelyn, Mrs. Turner. For services to the community in Solihull, West Midlands.
- Patricia, Mrs. Turner, Member, Mid Bedfordshire District Council. For services to Local Government.
- Jill Mary, Mrs. Twamley, J.P. For services to St. John Ambulance Brigade in Surrey.
- Margaret Joan, Mrs. Tyler, Secretary, Institute of Trade Marks Attorneys. For services to the Trade Marks Profession.
- Henry James Tyrrell. For services to Young People through Football in Roby, Merseyside.
- Lorna Margaret, Mrs. Tyson, Director of Business and Enterprise, Myerscough College, Preston. For services to Rural Enterprise in the North West.
- Jalal Uddin. For services to Community Relations in the West Midlands.
- Judith Fay, Mrs. Usiskin. For services to Jewish Royal Women's Aid and to the Jewish Community
- Francis Ivor Vickery, Assistant Chief Executive, East Thames Housing Group. For services to Social Housing in London.
- Mavis Joan, Mrs. Wainman. For services to the community of Kemnay, Aberdeenshire.
- Penelope Jayne, Mrs. Wainwright, Higher Executive Officer, Jobcentre Plus, Department for Work and Pensions.
- Miss Enid Walker, Organist and Choir Mistress, St. Andrew's Methodist Church, Halifax. For services to Music.
- Jane, Mrs. Wallace, Executive Officer, Jobcentre Plus, Department for Work and Pensions.
- Ross Warburton, chair, Federation of Bakers. For services to the Food and Drink Manufacturing Industry.
- Eric Ward, Administrative Officer, Jobcentre Plus, Department for Work and Pensions.
- Ivy May, Mrs. Ward. For services to the community in Chippenham, Wiltshire.
- Rosalind, Mrs. Ware, Grade E1, Ministry of Defence.
- Brian Watson, Project Manager, Community Service Volunteers. For services to Young People in Sunderland and Gateshead.
- Hazel, Mrs. Watson. For services to the British Red Cross Society.
- Dr. Jane Wells, Founder Member and vice-chair, Meningitis Trust. For services to People with Meningitis.
- William Weston. For services to the community in Buxton, Derbyshire.
- Cynthia, Mrs. Wheeler. For services to the British Red Cross Society in Somerset.
- David Philip Wheeler. For services to the community in Steephill Cove, Isle of Wight.
- Barrie Richard White, Business Adviser, Business Support Team London, Inland Revenue.
- Valerie, Mrs. Wilkes. For services to the Kirkby Colliery Welfare Band in Nottinghamshire.
- Beryl Constance, Mrs. Wilkins. For services to the community in Plymstock, Devon.
- Christopher Derek Wilkinson, Constable, West Midlands Police. For services to the Police.
- Joan, Mrs. Wilkinson, HIV Outreach Worker. For services to Young People in the Wirral, Merseyside.
- Derrick Walter Williams. For charitable services. Emrys Williams, musical director, Great Sutton Male Voice Choir. For services to Music in Ellesmere Port, Cheshire.
- Mark Williams. For services to Snooker.
- Michael Brian Williams, Commons Warden, Clinton Devon Estates. For services to the Environment in Devon.
- William John Williams. For services to Local Government and to the community in Blaenau Gwent.
- David George Williamson. For public service.
- Ms Elizabeth Williamson, Grade B3, Education Department, Information Analysis and Communication Division, Scottish Executive.
- Michael Willis. For services to the community in Ilford, Essex.
- Dr. Robert Stanley Wilson, Consultant Physician, Shrewsbury Hospital. For services to Medicine.
- Sylvia Ann, Mrs. Wilson, Childminder, Wellingborough, Northamptonshire. For services to Families.
- Miss Vivien Wilson. For services to the community in Teignmouth, Devon.
- Elizabeth Ruth, Mrs. Wimbush. For services to Young People through Cruse Bereavement Care in Edinburgh.
- Janet, Mrs.Winson, Teaching Assistant, Kilburn Infants School, Derbyshire. For services to Education.
- Derek Roy Winters, Deputy Governor, HM Prison and Young Offenders Institute, Low Newton, Durham, Home Office.
- Anthony Hartley-Woolley. For services to the Royal British Legion in Herefordshire and Worcestershire.
- Shirley Ann, Mrs. Woolley, Human Resources Director, Frederick Woolley Ltd. For services to Business in the West Midlands.
- Kathleen, Mrs. Worrell. For services to Netball.
- Clare Mary, Mrs. Wright, Architect. For services to Architecture.
- Irene, Mrs. Wright, chair, Access Committee for Birmingham. For services to Disabled People.
- Bryan John Young, Parish Councillor. For services to the community in Penselwood, Somerset.

== Saint Lucia ==
=== Order of St Michael and St George (CMG) ===
- Winston Clive-Victor Parris. For services to Medicine.

=== Order of the British Empire ===
==== Officer (OBE) ====
- Ms Agatha James. For services to Education.
- Llewellyn Xavier. For services in the field of Art.

==== Member (MBE) ====
- Miss Virginia Julienne Alexander. For services in the field of Culture.
- Louis George. For services to Politics.
- Mrs Berthia Monica Parle. For services to Tourism.

=== British Empire Medal (BEM) ===
- Ms Billie Francis Baptiste. For services to Teaching.
- Paul Nicholas Campous. For services to the Community.
- Stephen Brian Charles. For services to the community.
- Oliver Scott. For services to the Community.

== Solomon Islands ==
=== The Queen's Service Medal (QSM) ===
Darren Mark Folau	Detective, New Zealand Police, Auckland.

== The Cook Islands ==
=== Order of the British Empire ===
==== Knight Commander (KBE) ====
Frederick Goodwin JP.	For services to the Community

==== Officer (OBE) ====
Puruanio Paniora JP.	For services to the community in Aitutaki.

==== Member (MBE) ====
Temu Hagi JP	For community and public service.
