= James Wilfred Bridges =

British toxicologist

- Born: August 9, 1938; Kent, England
- Died: April 10, 2026 (aged 87); Surrey, England
- Education: King's College London (BSc); University of London (PhD, DSc)
- Known for: First chair in toxicology in the United Kingdom; Porton Down independent health study Co-founder of the British Toxicology Society and EUROTOX
- Awards: Fellow of the Royal Society of Chemistry (FRSC); Fellow of the Royal Society of Biology (FRSB); Fellow of the Royal College of Pathologists (FRCPath)
- Scientific career
- Fields: Toxicology, biochemistry, xenobiotic metabolism
- Institutions: University of Surrey; St Mary's Hospital Medical School
- Doctoral advisor: Richard Tecwyn Williams

James Wilfred "Jim" Bridges FRSC FRSB FRCPath (9 August 1938 – 10 April 2026) was a British toxicologist and academic. He held the first chair in toxicology in the United Kingdom, established at the University of Surrey, and co-founded both the British Toxicology Society and the Federation of European Societies of Toxicology (EUROTOX).

Bridges's independent research on the health of Cold War military veterans exposed to chemical trials at Porton Down served as key evidence in legal actions against the British government. His findings contributed to a 2008 apology and a £3 million financial settlement from the Ministry of Defence.

== Early life and education ==
James Bridges was born in Kent, England, on 9 August 1938. He completed his undergraduate studies at King's College London, graduating with a Bachelor of Science (BSc) in biology and physiology in 1960. He earned a PhD in toxicology and analytical chemistry in 1963 from St Mary's Hospital Medical School, University of London, under the supervision of biochemist Richard Tecwyn Williams. In 1992, the University of London awarded him a Doctor of Science (DSc) degree in recognition of his research output.

== Academic career ==
Bridges began his career as a research assistant (1960–1962) and lecturer (1962–1968) at St Mary's Hospital Medical School. In 1968, he moved to the University of Surrey in Guildford as a Senior Lecturer, collaborating with Dennis Parke to establish the university's biochemistry and toxicology programs.

In 1978, the University of Surrey appointed Bridges to a newly established chair in Toxicology, the first such chair in the United Kingdom. He was simultaneously appointed as the first director of the Robens Institute of Industrial and Environmental Health and Safety. Bridges later served in administrative roles at the university, including Dean of Science (1988–1992), Head of the European Institute of Health and Medical Sciences (1992–2000), and Pro-Vice-Chancellor of International Relations. He supervised nearly 100 PhD students during his academic career.

== Research and public policy ==
=== Porton Down inquiry ===
In the mid-2000s, Bridges was commissioned to conduct an independent scientific study into the health of British military veterans who had participated in Cold War-era chemical trials (involving exposure to agents such as sarin and mustard gas) at the Porton Down research facility.

After reviewing military and medical archives, Bridges concluded that the veterans' chronic illnesses were likely caused by their exposure to these chemical agents. This study served as the primary scientific evidence in subsequent legal challenges, leading to a 2008 out-of-court compensation settlement of £3 million and an apology from the Ministry of Defence to 360 surviving veterans.

=== Advisory roles ===
Bridges advised several international and European regulatory bodies. He chaired the European Union's Scientific Committee on Toxicology, Ecotoxicology and the Environment (CSTEE) from 1997 to 2004, and the Scientific Committee on Emerging and Newly Identified Health Risks (SCENIHR) from 2004 to 2013. From 2013 to 2025, he chaired the International Dialogue on the Evaluation of Allergens (IDEA), a joint initiative between the European Commission and the International Fragrance Association focused on skin allergy risk assessments.

=== Professional societies and publications ===
In 1971, Bridges co-founded the "Toxicology Club", which was formally incorporated as the British Toxicology Society (BTS) in 1979; he served as its president from 1980 to 1982. He was also a founding member of the Federation of European Societies of Toxicology (EUROTOX) and its president in 1987.

His research focused on chemical metabolism, mechanisms of toxic injury, and the development of in vitro alternatives to animal testing. He published approximately 300 research papers and co-edited 18 textbooks. His final book, A Taste for Poisons, was published posthumously by CRC Press on 26 June 2026, and outlines toxicological risk assessments for drugs, biocides, food additives, and cosmetics.

== Honours and awards ==
Bridges was a Fellow of the Royal Society of Chemistry (FRSC), the Royal Society of Biology (FRSB), and the Royal College of Pathologists (FRCPath), as well as an Honorary Fellow of the British Toxicology Society. He was awarded an honorary doctorate by Hong Kong Baptist University in 2002. In 2024, he was elected as a Foreign Academician of the Royal Academy of Veterinary Sciences of Spain (Real Academia de Ciencias Veterinarias de España).

== Personal life and death ==
Bridges was married to academic Dr. Olga Bridges. He died at his home in Surrey on 10 April 2026, at the age of 87.
