= St. Soldier Educational Society =

St. Soldier Educational Society is an Indian group of schools and colleges that was established in 1958.

The Society has more than 30,000 students in India from Pre-Nursery to Post Graduation. The society has established 33 schools and 21 colleges. Its offerings include Engineering, Management, Pharmacy, Hotel Management, LL.B., MBA, BBA, MCA, B. Pharmacy, D. Pharmacy, BHM, M.Sc. and B.Sc. The head office is located in Model Town Jalandhar.

== Institutions ==
- Paradise College of Education
- St. Soldier Girls College, Nurmahal
- St. Soldier Girls college, Khambra
- St. Soldier Degree College, Phagwara
- St. Soldier Inter College
- St. Solder ETT & NTT College
- St. Soldier Management & Technology Institute
- St. Soldier Institute of Hotel Management & Catering Technology
- St. Soldier Industrial Training Institute
- St. Soldier Institute of Polytechnic & Pharmacy
- St. Soldier Institute of Pharmacy
