= Tim Marrs =

British toxicologist (1945–2025)

Tim Marrs OBE FRCP FRCPath FBTS
- Born: Timothy Clive Marrs; 27 August 1945; Edenbridge, Kent, England
- Died: 1 November 2025 (aged 80); Edenbridge, Kent, England
- Education: MD DSc
- Alma mater: Westminster Hospital Medical School
- Occupation: Toxicologist

Timothy Clive Marrs (27 August 1945 – 1 November 2025) was an English toxicologist who advised governments and international agencies on poisons, organophosphate insecticides and carcinogenic substances in food.

A Fellow of the Royal College of Pathologists and of the British Toxicology Society, he held senior roles at Porton Down and the Food Standards Agency.

== Early life and education ==
Timothy Clive Marrs was born in Edenbridge, Kent on 27 August 1945, to Wallace Myers Marrs and Barbara Hobson. He was educated at Tonbridge School, Tonbridge, Kent from 1958 and graduated in 1963. Marrs then studied at Westminster Hospital Medical School and qualified in 1968 with a MB BS. He continued his studies in 1970 in pathology at Westminster Hospital Medical School until 1975. Marrs obtained a MSc in 1973 and in 1977, a MD, a postgraduate research degree in medicine.

== Career ==
Marrs joined St. Stephen's Hospital in 1975 as a consultant chemical pathologist and also became a Member of the Royal College of Pathologists that same year. In 1980, Marrs joined the Chemical Defence Establishment at Porton Down as a Medical Officer in Research, and eventually became the head of the pathology and clinical toxicology section. He left Porton Down in 1990 and joined the Department of Health in its Toxicology and Environmental Health Division. Marrs obtained a DSc in 1994. He became the section head of pesticides and veterinary medicines until 2000. In 1997, he became a Fellow of the Royal College of Pathologists and in 1998, a Fellow of the British Toxicology Society. The Food Standards Agency was created in 2000 and Marrs joined it, serving as its chief toxicologist before retiring in 2005. He then formed his own toxicology consulting firm, Edentox Associates, which he managed until his death. Marrs was also a consulting clinical toxicologist at the National Poisons Information Service in Birmingham, England.

== Death ==
Marrs died in Edenbridge, Kent on 1 November 2025, at the age of 80.

== Honours ==
Marrs was appointed an Officer of the Order of the British Empire (OBE) in the 2004 Birthday Honours.

== Selected publications ==
- Chemical Warfare Agents: Toxicology and Treatment. Marrs T.C., Maynard, Robert L. and Sidell, Frederick. John Wiley, Chichester. 1996;
- General and Applied Toxicology. ed. Ballantyne B., Marrs T.C. and Syversen, T. Macmillan/Stockton Press Ltd. 1999;
- Organophosphates and Health. Karalleidde L.K., Feldman S.J., Henry J. and Marrs T.C. London, Imperial College Press. 2001
- Toxicology of Herbicides. Marrs T.C. John Wiley, Chichester. 2003.
- Pesticide Toxicology and International Regulation. Marrs T.C. and Ballantyne B. John Wiley, London. 2004.
