= Berthia Monica Parle =

Saint Lucian hotelier and senator

Berthia Monica Parle MBE is a Saint Lucian hotelier, restaurateur, senator and diplomat.

== Biography ==
Parle began her career in the hospitality sector as a trainee at the Steigenberger Cariblue Hotel in Saint Lucia. She then trained at hotels in Bermuda and Germany. In 1985, Parle was among investors for the restaurant Capone's, then Sweet Dreams Ice Cream Parlour and the Patio Restaurant in Saint Lucia.

Parle was president of the Saint Lucia Hotel and Tourism Association, during a period when the rise of all-inclusive resorts threatened small hotels and local entrepreneurs. Parle also encouraged Caribbean governments to work together to ensure financial benefits from the cruise sector and sustainable tourism in the region.

In 2002, Parle was elected as the first Vice President of the Caribbean Hotel Association (CHA). In 2003, Parle was awarded the Golden Conch as Caribbean Hotelier of the Year at the annual Caribbean Hotel Industry Conference and was listed as "one of the most powerful women in tourism" by Travel Agent magazine. In the 2004 Birthday Honours for the Commonwealth realms, Parle was appointed Member of the Order of the British Empire for services to the tourism industry.

Parle served as the first female president of the CHA from 2004 to 2006. In 2007, Parle announced the opening of Bay Gardens Beach Resort in Saint Lucia.

In 2012, Parle was appointed by the Governor-General of Saint Lucia, Pearlette Louisy, as an independent senator in the Senate of Saint Lucia, the upper house of the Parliament of Saint Lucia. Parle was elected by the senators to act as deputy president of the Senate from 2012 to 2016. While in post as senator, Parle challenged local farmers to diversify their production to decrease the importing of produce by the Saint Lucian hospitality sector. Parle is "often prominently featured in the press as a kind of "voice" during St. Lucian elections."

Parle served as Honorary Consul to Finland for a decade and was appointed to the Order of the Lion of Finland and Order of the White Rose of Finland in honour of her service.

== Awards ==
- Caribbean Hotelier of the Year (2003)
- Member of the Order of the British Empire
- Order of the Lion of Finland
- Order of the White Rose of Finland
