= Thomas Duggin =

British former diplomat

Sir Thomas Joseph Duggin
- Born: 15 September 1947 (age 78)
- Education: Thornleigh Salesian College
- Occupation: British Diplomat

Sir Thomas Joseph Duggin (born 15 September 1947) is a British former diplomat who was high commissioner to Vanuatu and ambassador to Colombia.

== Biography ==
Duggin was educated at Thornleigh Salesian College and joined the British Diplomatic Service in 1967. He served in Oslo, Bucharest, Bangkok, La Paz, Mexico City and at the Foreign and Commonwealth Office. He was British High Commissioner to Vanuatu 1992–95 and ambassador to Colombia 2001–05.

Duggin was knighted in the 2004 Birthday Honours.
