= Richard Harrison (scientist) =

British space scientist

Richard Anthony Harrison MBE FRAS FInstP is the Head of Space Physics Division and Chief Scientist at the Rutherford Appleton Laboratory in the United Kingdom. He is best known for his magnetic twisting theory involving the coronal heating problem of the Sun's atmosphere.

He was awarded the MBE (Member of the Order of the British Empire) in the 2004 Queen's Birthday Honours for his services to Solar Research.

== In popular media ==
Harrison appeared in an episode of the BBC documentary series Horizon, "Secrets of the Star Disc", in 2004.

He was also acknowledged in the credits to Wonders of the Solar System: Empire of the Sun, a 2010 BBC TV series.
