= Hugh Collum =

British businessman

Sir Hugh Robert Collum (29 June 1940 – 29 August 2005) was a British businessman, best known for his time as chairman of British Nuclear Fuels Ltd (BNFL).

Sir Hugh was a financial director for Courage Breweries and chief financial officer at SmithKline Beecham before becoming chairman of BNFL in 1999. He led the company through a partial privatisation and a series of crises at Sellafield before his retirement in June 2004. He was knighted in the 2004 Birthday Honours.
