= Llewellyn Xavier =

Saint Lucian artist (born 1945)

Sir Llewellyn Xavier KCMG OBE (born 12 October 1945) is a Saint Lucian artist.

== Biography ==
Xavier left Saint Lucia for Barbados in 1962, working as an agricultural apprentice for a time. A friend gave him a box of watercolors, and he was soon drawn to art. His first exhibition was a great success, and soon his reputation was established. In 1968, Xavier moved to England, where he became a pioneer in the field of mail art. He enrolled in the school of the Museum of Fine Arts, Boston, USA, in 1979, and for a time was a Cistercian monk in Montreal, Canada. After a time, he left the monastery, marrying and returning to Saint Lucia in 1987.

Probably Xavier's most important work to date is a large cycle of collages created around 1993. Titled Global Council for Restoration of the Earth's Environment, it was first shown at the Patrick Cramer Gallery in Geneva in May of that year. The collages incorporate all manner of recycled materials, including naturalist prints from the eighteenth and nineteenth centuries and postage stamps from many countries. They also include signatures of various world leaders of environmentalism and of a number of conservationists.

Xavier is also well known for his oil paintings, characterized by multicolored pearls of paint applied to the surface of the canvas using a series of special tools, a technique developed over the past few decades. The brilliant palettes of the paintings draw inspiration from the Caribbean environment in which Xavier lives and works. During his lengthy career, Xavier has also produced drawings, watercolors and mixed media works.

Xavier was appointed an OBE in 2004 in recognition of his contributions to the art of the Commonwealth. He is the founder of the Saint Lucia Sculpture Park, intended to bring public art to the landscape of the island.

Xavier's work is in the collection of the Metropolitan Museum of Art, the American Museum of Natural History, the Smithsonian Institution, the Museum of Modern Art, and the Victoria and Albert Museum, among others.

In 2016 he was honored with a solo exhibition at Phillips in New York. On the occasion of the exhibition, Edward Dolman, the CEO of Phillips, called Xavier “one of the greatest artists ever to emerge from the Caribbean…a dynamic voice in the dialogue between globalization and localism.”
