= Travel Agent (magazine) =

Travel industry magazine

- Senior Editor: Mark Rogers
- Categories: Travel industry
- Frequency: Biweekly
- Publisher: John McMahon
- Founded: 1930
- Company: Questex
- Country: United States
- Based in: New York City
- Language: English
- Website: www.travelagentcentral.com

Travel Agent is a biweekly trade magazine, published by Questex and targeted at travel agency professionals, featuring travel industry news. It is based in New York City.

== History and profile ==
The magazine was established in 1930. In 1998 Travel Agent was sold by Universal Media, Inc. to Advanstar Communications Inc. It was formerly published on a twice weekly bases in the 1970s and later on a weekly basis.

Travel Agent targets travel agents, agency owners/managers, and other travel industry staff. The magazine is also supplemented with an online edition. Questex Media also operates Travel Agent University, an on-line travel education site. Sister publications include: Luxury Travel Advisor, Home Based Travel Agent, Official Travel Industry Directory, Hotel & Motel Management, Premier Hotels & Resorts and Premier Spas & Romance.

Travel Agent is the recipient of Folio magazine's editorial excellence award in the travel trade category.
