= Ian Bruce (charity marketing) =

British academic (born 1945)

Ian Bruce CBE FRSA CCMI
- Born: Ian Waugh Bruce; 21 April 1945 (age 81)
- Education: University of Birmingham
- Occupation: Charity marketing
- Spouse: Professor Tina Bruce CBE
- Website: Profile of Ian Bruce at Bayes Business School (formerly Cass), City, University London

Ian Waugh Bruce (born 21 April 1945) is a British charity leader, cause campaigner and academic. He is vice-president of the Royal National Institute of Blind People (RNIB). He is also the founder and president of the Centre for Charity Effectiveness at Bayes Business School (formerly Cass), City, University of London.

== Education ==
Bruce was educated at King Edward VI School, Southampton, at Central High School in Phoenix, Arizona, and at the University of Birmingham, where he obtained a Bachelor's degree in Social Sciences.

== Career ==
- 1983 – 2003, Director General, RNIB
- 1991 – 2010, Director, Centre for Charity Effectiveness, Bayes Business School (formerly Cass), City University London
- 2003 – present, Vice President, RNIB
- 2010 – present, President, Centre for Charity Effectiveness, Bayes Business School (formerly Cass), City, University of London

== Honours and awards ==
Bruce was awarded an honorary degree as Doctor of Social Sciences from the University of Birmingham in 1995.

He was appointed CBE in the 2004 Birthday Honours.

== Books ==
- Bruce, Ian (1998). Successful charity marketing: meeting need (second ed.). London: ICSA Pub. with Prentice Hall Europe. ISBN 9781860720383.
- Bruce, Ian; Rayner, Anthony (1992). Managing and staffing Britain's largest charities. London: VOLPROF. ISBN 9780952056317.
- Bruce, Ian (2011). Charity marketing: delivering income, campaigns and services. London: ICSA Pub. ISBN 9781860724596.
- Bruce, Ian (2023). Vision Changing Charity: RNIB in Socio-Political Context, 1970-2010. Lutterworth Press. ISBN 978-0-7188-9640-9
