= Raghbir Mhajan =

Sikh tennis line judge

Raghbir Mhajan MBE, also known as Raghbir Singh Mhajan, was the first Sikh tennis line judge to officiate at Wimbledon.

== Biography ==
Born and raised in Kenya, Mhajan settled in London in 1972 and became the first Indian to officiate at Wimbledon. He is famed for his run-ins with John McEnroe, especially in 1981, when he was accused of being biased in his judgments.

In 2004, he was awarded an MBE for services to tennis in the 2004 Birthday Honours.
