= Questex =

Questex LLC
- Company type: Private
- Industry: Mass media
- Founded: April 2005; 20 years ago
- Headquarters: New York City
- Key people: Paul Miller, CEO
- Brands: Travel Agent; Hotel Management; Fierce Pharma; Fierce Biotech; Fierce Healthcare; Fierce Network; Affordable Housing Finance; Multifamily Executive
- Owner: MidOcean Partners
- Website: questex.com

Questex is a publisher of brands in the travel, hospitality, healthcare, real estate, beauty, and technology markets. The company also hosts tradeshows and events. It is owned by MidOcean Partners.

== History ==
The company was formed in April 2005 by Audax Groep, which bought assets from Advanstar Holdings for $185 million. Kerry Gumas became CEO upon formation.

In August 2007, the company acquired Oxford Publishing.

In January 2008, the company acquired Fierce Markets.

In October 2009, the company filed for bankruptcy protection. In November 2009, it was acquired by its senior lenders for $120 million in debt.

In September 2014, the company was acquired by an investment fund managed by Shamrock Capital.

In September 2018, the company was acquired by MidOcean Partners for an estimated $180 million and Paul Miller became CEO.

In July 2025, the company acquired Affordable Housing Finance and Multifamily Executive from Zonda Home, also owned by MidOcean Partners.
