= British Toxicology Society =

The British Toxicology Society has over 900 members (as of January 2020) who are based in over 40 countries. It is the National British professional association for toxicologists. The remit of the Society is to promote the advancement of the science of toxicology, for public benefit.

Members of the Society work in academic, governmental and industrial organisations, to understand scientific mechanisms responsible for adverse effects (toxicity) and to protect the public and the environment from exposure to potentially hazardous substances, including chemicals and medicines.

== History ==
It was formed in 1979 from the predecessor organisation The Toxicology Club of the UK.

== Structure ==
The British Toxicology Society, is a learned scientific society with registered charitable status (not for profit), which is led by an Executive Committee (Trustees) who are elected from its members. Distinguished members of the Society are elected as Fellows (FBTS) or Honorary Fellows.

The administrative office of the Society is based in Staffordshire.

== Function ==
The British Toxicology exists to advance the scientific and professional activities of toxicology for public benefit. The annual scientific meeting of the British Toxicology Society (Congress) is usually held at a Conference centre of a UK city, in April of each year. The Official Journal of the BTS is Toxicology Research, which published by Oxford University Press from 2020, and was formerly published by the RSC's ChemSpider chemical structure database.

The BTS sponsored the formation of the UK Register of Toxicologists in 1993, which is now a special interest group of the Royal Society of Biology. Individuals who are members of the UK Register of Toxicologists are recognised by the European Register of Toxicologists of EUROTOX (European Society of Toxicology) an entitled to use the postnominal ERT.
