= Julian Horn-Smith =

British businessman (born 1948)

Sir Julian Michael Horn-Smith
- Born: December 1948 (age 77)
- Education: University of London; University of Bath
- Occupation: businessman

Sir Julian Michael Horn-Smith (born December 1948) is a British businessman who is a member of the boards of a number of international corporations and an advisor to others. He was deputy chief executive of Vodafone until July 2006.

Horn-Smith joined Vodafone at its foundation in 1984 and held a number of senior posts including chief operating officer, managing director of Vodafone International and deputy group CEO. Considered a principal architect in the development of Vodafone's global strategy, during his career with the company he was closely involved in many of Vodafone's major international transactions, including the formation of Vodafone AirTouch in 1999. This merger (of the UK and US businesses) created one of the top 25 companies in the world by market capitalisation. The subsequent acquisition of Mannesmann in 2000 almost doubled the size of Vodafone, making it the world's largest mobile telecommunications company and the largest FTSE100 quoted stock.

In 1996, he was appointed to the board and in 2005 became deputy chief executive. Horn-Smith was instrumental in the foundation of many of Vodafone's largest subsidiary businesses today, such as those in Turkey, Ireland, Netherlands, South Africa, and Egypt.

== Early life, education and honours ==
Horn-Smith received a bachelor's degree in Economics from the University of London, and a master's degree in Business Administration with Finance and Marketing from the University of Bath in 1979.

In 2007 Horn-Smith received an honorary doctorate from the University of Bath where he was a pro-chancellor and a member of the University Council until July 2018.

In 2004, he received a knighthood in the Queen's Birthday Honours for his services to international telecommunications.

== Current business activities ==
In 2006, Horn-Smith was appointed to the board of Digicel Group, a private telecom group.

Between 2010 and July 2018, Horn-Smith was a Pro Chancellor of Bath University where he also chairs the School of Management's Advisory Board.

Until May 2012, Horn-Smith was a member of the board of Lloyds Banking Group where he chaired the nomination committee that selected Sir Win Bischoff, the recent chairman. Following the take-over of HBOS, Lloyds are today the UK's largest retail bank.

Horn-Smith has been a senior advisor at UBS Investment Bank since 2007, specialising in the telecom and media sector, advising several major telecommunication companies. Since 2009, he has also been a senior advisor at the UK private equity group CVC, based in London. In 2009, he joined the board of e-Mobile and eAccess in Japan. He advised them during the takeover by Softbank. Until early 2015 he was an advisor to the chairman and the board of Etisalat.

In late 2013, Horn-Smith joined Alix Partners, the US consulting group (part owned by CVC), as an advisor in the telecommunications sector. He held non-executive directorships at UK FTSE companies including Smiths Group plc (Engineering), Sage Group plc (software), where he also served as chairman, DelaRue plc (security printing) and Acer Group (Taiwan). He has also served on the boards of Verizon Wireless and China Mobile.

In September 2020, Horn-Smith was named chairman of renewable energy start-up Alpha 311.
