= John Brookes (landscape designer) =

English landscape designer (1933–2018)

John Andrews Brookes
- Born: 11 October 1933; Durham City, U.K.
- Died: 16 March 2018 (aged 84)
- Occupations: Garden and landscape design

John Andrew Brookes, MBE (11 October 1933 – 16 March 2018) was a garden and landscape designer. He started designing gardens and landscapes in the late 1950s and designed thousands of gardens. He also taught and lectured about horticulture, landscape and interior design.

Beginning as a Modernist and working with Dame Sylvia Crowe, Brenda Colvin, Geoffrey Jellicoe and other notable architects and landscape architects, Brookes came of age in the dawn of garden and landscape design for the middle classes in Britain and in the heyday of 1960s London.

Brookes was influenced by painters such as Piet Mondrian and Ben Nicholson, and brought abstract and modernist principles to garden design. He espoused the concept that a garden's design should be based first and foremost on the needs of its occupants, taking it out of the realm of the grand garden traditions which were labour-intensive, expensive, and high maintenance. He is the author of over two dozen books, including Room Outside and John Brookes, Master Class, that have been translated into several languages and has taught and lectured in venues around the globe, including Iran, Argentina, Japan, Russia, and the US.

In 2004, Brookes was made a Member of the Order of the British Empire (MBE) for his for contributions to Garden Design and Services to Horticulture.

He died on 16 March 2018 at the age of 84.

== Early life ==
Brookes was born in Durham City, UK in 1933, to Edward Percy Brookes and Margaret Alexandra (Poppy) Brookes. He was strongly influenced in his early years by the architecture of Christopher Tunnard, Thomas Church, and Roberto Burle Marx. He also developed an interest in horticulture through years of working on neighbouring farms and long walks and drives through the variable English landscape.

== Career ==
In 1954, after visiting gardens in Southern France and studying horticulture, Brookes enrolled in a three-year apprenticeship in Nottingham Parks Department. His tasks included gardening in walled vegetable gardens, planting traffic islands in the Victorian mode of “bedding-out”, working in hothouses, and arranging flowers for various civic functions. He spent the last six months in the department's design office with the Dutch landscape architect Harry Blom who taught Brookes how to draw to scale and in ink, and introduced him to the professional aspects of landscape design.

Four years in the offices of Dame Sylvia Crowe and Brenda Colvin, renowned landscape architects, provided Brookes with further experience and an introduction to London, and he subsequently started his own practice. The next four years he spent working at Architectural Design magazine where he was introduced to prominent architects and landscape architects, and was able to write his own column. He broke into the public realm at the Chelsea Flower Show in 1962, when, as the first independent designer to display a garden, he won the Flora silver medal for a Modernist design that broke with traditional, more horticulturally orientated approaches to garden design. He was 29 years old.

His Modernist courtyard for the headquarters of Penguin Books in 1964, brought him wide acclaim and he went on to work on several prominent projects in London, including Fitzroy Square, Bryanston Square, and a courtyard garden for the architect, Michael Manser. He also exhibited several times at the Chelsea Flower Show in the 1970s, earning gold medals for the Financial Times and the Inchbald School of Design.

In addition to his private design practice and writing for publications like Architectural Design, Brookes began teaching and lecturing, first at the Institute of Park Administration and then at the Regent Street Polytechnic Institution (now the University of Westminster), and the Royal Botanic Garden at the Kew School of Garden Design. In 1975, he became the Director of Garden Design Studies at the Inchbald School of Design, founded by Jacqueline Duncan (then Inchbald) as the first interior design school in Europe and its first modern garden design school. Two years later, when Inchbald was asked to establish a School of Interior Design by the Tehran Chamber of Commerce, Brookes went to Iran as its first director. When the school was forced to close because of political events, Brookes returned via India, where he spent several months conducting research for his second book, Gardens of Paradise, which focused on the history of Islamic gardens, published in 1988.

Upon his return, Brookes resumed his practice and established the Clock House School of Design at Denmans Gardens, near Chichester in West Sussex. He quickly began designing, lecturing, and teaching in the United States and Canada, and subsequently as far afield as Japan, Argentina, South Africa, Australia, and Russia. He continued publishing books as well.

Among the thousands of gardens he has designed, Brookes’ major public works include the courtyard garden at Penguin Books, the English Garden at the Chicago Botanic Garden, the English Garden at Barakura, in Japan, the College Garden at Westminster Abbey, and Fitzroy Square. He has also designed private estates in the United Kingdom, Patagonia, New York State, Russia, and Poland.

== Design philosophy ==
Brookes was greatly influenced by several American landscape designers, but considers Thomas Church to be his "guru". Church's landmark book Gardens Are for People led Brookes to his own garden philosophy in which he concluded that what a client needs and wants comes first in formulating a design for a garden. The design and style of the garden is then driven by the characteristics, features, and orientation of the site, the architecture of the house or outbuildings and how they are sited, the patterns and topography of the land, and the cultural context, including history, of the site. The last step in his design projects is the creation of a planting plan. Brookes clearly articulated his guiding design principle – that "gardens are fundamentally a place for the use by people" — in his first book, Room Outside, published in 1969 and revised in 2007. This was revolutionary thinking in the 1960s.

== The grid ==
From his exposure to modern architecture and architects, and an intense interest in modern painters, especially Piet Mondrian and Ben Nicholson, Brookes developed a method of using a grid as a means of imposing discipline on his designs. The purpose of the grid was to connect the vertical lines of a building with the horizontal lines of a garden by projecting the house module or grid on plan, and extending it beyond the house to create a pattern for the garden that would ultimately have a proportionate relationship to the structure it surrounded. In this way, the grid principle evolved into a methodology in which geometric curves and squares could be introduced to create simple flowing lines and defining spaces.

== Denmans Garden ==
In 1980, Brookes established himself at Denmans, a private garden that was then owned by Joyce Robinson, a great plantswoman, who had acquired the garden in the late 1940s. At the time she and her husband acquired the garden, it had suffered years of neglect and the house associated with the property had been used by as a mess for the officers from nearby Tangmere Air Base during World War II. They grew fruits and flowers for the Covent Garden market in London, and eventually she began gardening for her own pleasure. Brookes was intrigued by her bold planting style and use of gravel, which he'd been using since the early 1960s, and was drawn to the garden's moderate climate and beautiful location at the foot of the West Sussex South Downs.

In addition to restarting his practice and establishing his first design school at Denmans, Brookes took over the garden from the ageing “Mrs. JR” as she was known. He gardened there till the end of his life. The garden is open to the public.

== Books ==
- 1969 Room Outside – Thames & Hudson, Viking; 1979 Penguin paperbacks
- 1970 Living in the Garden, Queen Ann Press
- 1970 Gardens for Small Spaces – Pan Books
- 1970 Garden Design and Layout – Queen Anne Press
- 1975 Financial Times Book of Garden Design – David & Charles
- 1977 Improve Your Lot – Heinemann
- 1977 The Small Garden – Marshall Cavendish; 1984 Aura Paperbacks
- 1984 A Place in the Country – Thames & Hudson
- 1986 The Indoor Garden Book – Dorling Kindersley (Germany – Christian Verlaag; USA – Crown)
- 1987 Gardens of Paradise – Weidenfeld
- 1987 The Country Garden – Dorling Kindersley (Germany – Christian Verlaag; USA – Crown)
- 1987 The Gardener's Index of Plants and Flowers with Kenneth Becket
- 1989 The New Small Garden Book – Dorling Kindersley (Germany – Christian Verlaag)
- 1991 John Brookes’ Garden Design Book – Dorling Kindersley (USA – Macmillan)
- 1994 Planting the Country Way – BBC Publications
- 1994 John Brookes’ Garden Design Workbook – Dorling Kindersley
- 1996 Home & Garden Style – with Eluned Price, Cassell Publications Ltd
- 1996 Planning a Small Garden, Dorling Kindersley
- 1998 John Brookes’ The New Garden – Dorling Kindersley (USA – Macmillan)
- 2002 John Brookes Garden Masterclass – Dorling Kindersley
  - (Guild of Garden Writers – Enthusiasts Book of the Year 2002–2003)
- 2006 Small Gardens – Revised, Dorling Kindersley
- 2007 John Brookes Garden Design Course – Mitchell Beazley
- 2007 Room Outside -Revised, Antique Collectors’ Club
- 2007 John Brookes – Well Designed Garden – Dorling Kindersley

== Awards ==
- 1962 awarded 1st prize Institute of Landscape Architects competition garden Chelsea Flower Show.
- 1971 awarded Gold Medal Garden Design Chelsea for Financial Times
- 1972 awarded Gold Medal Garden Design Chelsea for Financial Times
- 1973 awarded Gold Medal Garden Design Chelsea for Financial Times
- 1975 awarded Silver Medal Garden Design Chelsea for Inchbald School of Design
- 1976 awarded Gold Medal Garden Design Chelsea for Inchbald School of Design
- 1977 awarded Silver Medal Garden Design Chelsea for Inchbald School of Design
- 1987 awarded BP/USA Garden Writers award
- 1988 awarded Prix St. Fiacre de L’Association de Journalists de l’Horticulture Grand Livre de Jardin Plant et Jardine d’Interieur
- 1992 awarded Garden writers Association of America Award of Excellence for Book of Garden Design
- 1992 awarded Quill and Trowel Award of Excellence
- 1999 awarded Hutchinson Medal, Horticultural Society of Chicago
- 2000 awarded Japan Flora 2000 – Overall Excellence Prize for Garden Design
- 2002 awarded Garden Writers Guild – Enthusiasts Book of the Year for Garden Masterclass
- 2003 awarded Sussex Heritage Trust – The Landscape Award for Ecclesden Manor, Angmering, West Sussex.
- 2004 awarded Member of the Order of the British Empire (MBE)
  - Garden Designer. For services to Horticulture in the UK and Overseas.
- 2006 awarded Honorary Doctorate Degree of Writtle College, University of Essex
  - For services to the Horticultural industry and specifically Garden Design, recognising the excellent books he has written, contribution to world-famous magazines and other media appearances. The College also acknowledges his assistance as an External Consultant on the development and validation of Writtle Honours Degree courses in Landscape Design in the 1990s.
- 2008 awarded Honorary Fellow of the Kew Guild

== Notable projects ==
- Fitzroy Square, London
- The English Garden at the Chicago Botanic Garden
- Barakura Gardens in Nagano Prefecture, Japan
- College Garden at Westminster Abbey
- Major private estates in the United Kingdom, the United States, Argentina, Poland, and Russia.
