= Intelligent customer =

Organizational service management

Intelligent customer function or intelligent client (IC) is an in-house capability within a host organisation which has responsibility for the ownership, management and delivery of a defined service or range of services on behalf of part or all of the organisation, to that organisation. Examples of the IC service include IT/IS services, property and facilities, project delivery, human resources, marketing, and research & development. The services for which the IC has responsibility can be delivered by resources employed by the host organisation (members of staff) or can be sourced from the market (an outsourced service). The IC is responsible for engagement with the host organisation to understand and capture the important aspects of the organisation's core business and strategy which the defined managed service will need to deliver benefits, and providing a representation of that service in language that is understood by the organisation, and for which the organisation accepts it will fund, typically a service level agreement. Where the service is to be delivered in part or full by a third party this agreement will need to be utilised in a specification or service requirement statement. This specification, as part of a tender document, enables the procurement of outsourced services.

The IC is often seen as facing both the host organisation and the supply chain; however it is typically the supply chain that uses the term "intelligent customer function/client". The IC must retain sufficient technical knowledge of the services being provided by a third party to competently specify requirements and manage delivery of the services.

The IC can be the responsibility of a single person; for example, a project manager. However, the requirement for a pervasive understanding of organisations at strategic, tactical and operational levels often requires the role of IC to be carried out by teams or organisations with defined, delegated responsibilities. The role of IC typically requires the collection and management of data that represents the dimensions, finances, assets, and resources of the host organisation that capture the requirement for the services that fall within the IC's area of responsibility. Understanding and interpreting the organisation's data, and how the services of the IC should be provided to meet the current and future needs of the organisation, are core responsibilities of the IC.

== Use in the United Kingdom ==
The Office for Nuclear Regulation of the Health and Safety Executive developed the concept of the "intelligent customer" in relation to licensee use of contractors and it has gained international acceptance.

The Office of Government Commerce defines the intelligent customer function in the context of information systems management.
