= Jacqueline Docherty =

Dame Jacqueline Docherty DBE is a British nursing administrator and medical professional, who was Chief Executive of West Middlesex University Hospital in February 2009 until its merger with Chelsea and Westminster Hospital NHS Foundation Trust, having previously beenDirector of Nursing, Director of Operations and Deputy Chief Executive at King's College Hospital, London.

She was appointed chief executive officer of London North West University Healthcsre NHS Trust in 2015, overseeing Northwick Park, St Marks, Central Middlesex and Ealing hospitals and a (dwindling) number of community services across Hillingdon, Harrow, Brent and Ealing.

She was appointed deputy director of Nursing at West Lothian NHS Trust prior to becoming a member of the Management Executive at the Department of Health, the Scottish Office for four years. Jacqueline's main areas of responsibility in the Scottish Office were in relation to Quality and Clinical Effectiveness and Audit.

Dame Jacqueline is a trustee of the King's Fund and co-chair of the London Social Partnership Forum.

== Career ==
In 1996 Jacqueline Doherty joined King's College Hospital as executive director of Nursing. She was also employed as an independent consultant to the Mexican Department of Health to support their Evidence Based Medicine programme, 1997–2000.

She accepted the position of executive director of Nursing at King's College Hospital in 2001,. In September 1999 Docherty was appointed as London Regional Champion to help support and implement the "Improving Working Lives" campaign. She was appointed Deputy Chief Executive of King's College Hospital in 2007.

She was chief executive at West Middlesex University Hospital from 2009 to 2015, then joined the London North West Healthcare NHS Trust as chief executive.

== Honours ==
Docherty was created a Dame Commander of the Order of the British Empire in recognition of her long career, during which she has nursed in Scotland, Bath and London and for her services to the NHS.
