= Toxicology Research =

- Discipline: Toxicology
- Language: English
- Edited by: Heather Wallace

Publication details
- History: 2012–present
- Publisher: Oxford University Press
- Frequency: 6 issues per year
- Open access: Hybrid
- Impact factor: 2.283 (2019)

Standard abbreviations
- ISO 4: Toxicol. Res.

Indexing
- ISSN: 2045-452X (print); 2045-4538 (web)

Links
- Journal homepage

Toxicology Research is a publication of Oxford University Press as of 2020. The Journal launched in 2012 and focuses on articles that cover biological, chemical, clinical, or environmental health aspects of the toxic response and the mechanisms involved.

== Abstracting and Indexing ==
Toxicology Research is abstracted and indexed in Biological Abstracts, BIOSIS Previews, EBSCOhost, Current Contents, Embase, Journal Citation Reports, ProQuest, PubMed, Science Citation Index, Scopus, and Web of Science. According to the latest Journal Citation Reports, the journal has a 2019 impact factor of 2.283, ranking it 64th out of 92 journals in the category "Toxicology".
