= Hotel Management =

American trade magazine

- Editor: David Eisen
- Categories: Hospitality industry, hotel management, magazine
- Frequency: 15x
- Publisher: Amy Vaxman
- Founded: 1875
- Company: Questex
- Country: US
- Based in: New York City
- Website: www.hotelmanagement.net
- ISSN: 0018-6082
- OCLC: 610525317

Hotel Management magazine is a trade journal focused on hotel management and published by Questex.

== History and profile ==
Hotel Management was established in New York in 1922 by Ahrens Publishers. It absorbed or merged with various other hotel management magazines over the years, including Hotel World, which had been established in 1875. The magazine sometimes took on other names such as Hotel & Motel Management., reflecting these mergers or changes in the market.

Later owners included Advanstar Communications.

In January 2011, the magazine was redesigned and renamed Hotel Management. Following these changes, the magazine began to cover articles about technology, development and trends/statistics. It is published fifteen times a year. It was formerly published 21 times per year. Its headquarters is in New York City.
