= Raghuvamsha (disambiguation) =

Raghuvaṃśa is a Sanskrit epic poem by Kalidasa.

Raghuvamsha may also refer to:

- Raghuvaṃśa (dynasty), a mythological Indian dynasty in Hindu texts such as the Ramayana, named after Raghu
- Raghuvamsham (film), a 1978 Indian Malayalam-language film by Adoor Bhasi

== See also ==
- Raghu (disambiguation)
- Raghava (disambiguation)
- Raghuvamsha Sudha, a popular kriti (composition) in Carnatic music about the Hindu deity Rama
- Raghuvansh Prasad Singh (1946–2020), an Indian socialist politician
- Lenin Raghuvanshi, an Indian Dalit rights activist, political thinker and social entrepreneur
- Raja Raghuvanshi (1996–2025), Indian murder victim, see Murder of Raja Raghuvanshi
- Shivani Raghuvanshi, an Indian actress
- Angkrish Raghuvanshi (born 2004), an Indian cricketer
