= Raghubir Singh =

Raghubir Singh may refer to:

- Raghubir Singh (equestrian), Indian equestrian
- Raghubir Singh (photographer) (1942–1999), Indian photographer
- Raghubir Singh Bali, Indian politician
- Raghubir Singh Bundi (1869–1927), Raja of Bundi
- Raghubir Singh Jind (1834–1887), Raja of Jind of the Phulkian dynasty

== See also ==
- Raghubir, an Indian male given name
- Singh, an Indian surname
- Raghubir Sinh, Indian politician
- Raghbir Singh (disambiguation)
- Raghuvir (disambiguation)
