= Raghuramaiah =

Raghuramaiah or Raghu Ramaiah, meaning Rama of Raghu, is an Indian (Telugu) given name. Notable people with the name include:

- Kalyanam Raghuramaiah (1901–1975), also known as Eelapata Raghuramaiah, Telugu drama and film actor
- Kotha Raghuramaiah (1912–1979), Indian parliamentarian

== See also ==
- Raghu (disambiguation)
- Rama (disambiguation)
- Ramaiah, an Indian surname
- Raghuram (1949-2013), Indian choreographer
- Raghu Ram (born 1973), Indian television producer and actor
- Raghuram Bhat, Indian cricketer
- Raghu Ramakrishnan, Indian computer scientist
- Raghu Rama Krishna Raju, Indian politician
- Raghuram Machha, Indian politician
- Raghu Ram Padal, Indian politician
- Raghu Ram Pillarisetti, Indian surgeon
- Raghuram Rajan, Indian economist and former governor of Reserve Bank of India
  - Raghuram Rajan Committee on Financial Sector Reforms
