= Varatantu =

Sage in Hinduism

- Affiliation: Rishi
- Texts: Puranas

Varatantu (Sanskrit: वरतन्तु, romanized: Varatantu, lit. 'boon-thread') is a sage in Hinduism. He establishes a school of thought called Vāratantavīya.

== Legend ==
Varatantu is featured in the Skanda Purana, having a dialogue with Nandi with other sages.

The disciple of Varatantu, Kautsa, seeks money from the Raghu in the Raghuvamsha.

In regional tradition, he is believed to have had a large ashram in Bharuch for the education of children in the kingdom of the second Raghu, the grandfather of Rama.

== See also ==
- Bhrigu
- Markandeya
- Kapila
