= Raghuvir =

Raghuvir is another name for the Hindu deity Rama, as an Indian male given name it may also refer to:

- Raghuvir (spiritual leader), Hindu religious leader
- Raghuvir Patel, Kenyan cricketer
- Raghuvir Sahay, Hindi poet
- Raghuvir Sharan Mitra, Hindi poet
- Raghuvir Singh Kadian, Indian politician
- Raghuvir Singh Shastri, Indian politician
- Anisetti Raghuvir, Governor of Assam, India

== See also ==
- Raghu Vira (1902–1963), Indian linguist, scholar, politician and member of the Constituent Assembly
- Raghuvira Gadyam, Hindu hymn about Rama
- Raghuveer (disambiguation)
- Raghubir, alternative form of the Indian male given name
  - Raghubir Singh (disambiguation)
- Raghu (disambiguation)
- VIR (disambiguation)
