= Ragu =

Ragu may refer to:

- Ragù, Italian meat sauce
- Ragú, American brand of sauces and condiments
- Ragu, a village in Uliești Commune, Dâmboviţa County, Romania
- Ragu, the nom de guerre of TMVP leader Kumaraswamy Nandagopan

== See also ==
- Ragout
- Rahu (disambiguation)
- Raghu (disambiguation)
