= Raghuvanshi =

Legendary dynasty in Hinduism

Raghuvaṃśa (Sanskrit: रघुवंश), also known as Raghuvansh or Raghukula, is a legendary Indian dynasty, prominently featured in Hindu scriptures such as the Itihasas and the Puranas. It is considered to be an offshoot of the Sūryavaṃśa or the Ikshvaku dynasty of Kshatriyas, tracing its ancestry to the sun deity Surya.

Kings of the Raghuvaṃśa line are referred to as Raghuvanshi or Raghuvaṃśī. The dynasty is named after Raghu, a legendary king who protected the sacrificial horse of the Ashvamedha from Indra. Notable Raghuvaṃśī kings include Mandhata, Harishchandra, Sagara, Bhagiratha, Dilīpa, Raghu, Aja, Dasharatha, and Lord Rama. Kalidasa's work, Raghuvaṃśa, narrates the epic of the Raghuvaṃśa in 19 sargas (cantos).

== Notable members ==
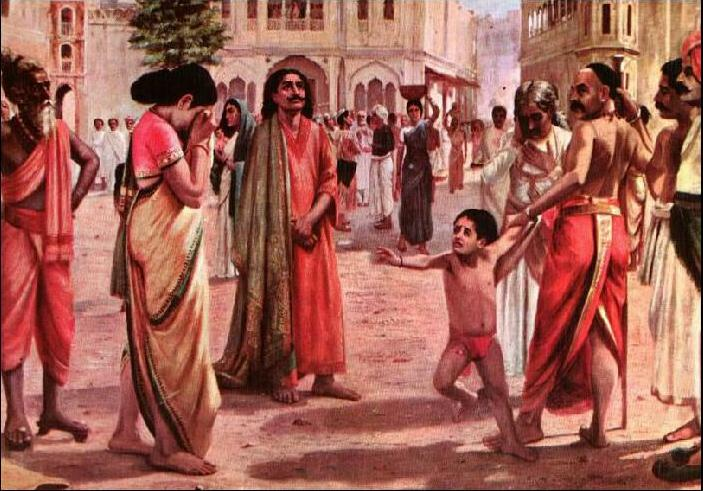
Harishchandra and his family are sold into bondage and separated. Painting by Raja Ravi Varma.

Several legendary kings came from the Solar dynasty and are referred to as Raghuvaṃśa after their ancestor, the king Raghu.

- Mandhata, who is said to have ruled the entire earth during the Vedic period, and defeated the Indra, the king of the devas.
- Sagara, a king who was tricked by Indra into a conflict with the sage Kapila, leading to the death of his 60,000 sons, the descent of the Ganga to earth, and his sons' revival
- Harishchandra, the king of Ayodhya, believed to be an exemplar of honesty
- Dilīpa, said to be the most righteous and chivalrous emperors of the Ikshvaku dynasty
- Bhagiratha said to be the legendary king of the Ikshvaku dynasty, who brought the river Ganga, personified as the river goddess Ganga, to Earth from the heavens
- Raghu II, whose descendants are known as Raghuvaṃśa. The Valmiki Ramayana refers to Raghukula, a clan of this king
- Aja, son of King Raghu and grandfather of Rama.
- Dasharatha, son of Aja and father of Rama, Lakshmana, Bharata, and Shatrughna
- Rama, he is considered the seventh avatar of Vishnu. Rama's story before he became king of Ayodhya is recounted in the Ramayana. After he ascended the throne, he performed the ashvamedha yajna. Bharata, his younger brother, won the country of Gandhara and settled there
- Lava and Kusha – They were the twin sons of Rama and his wife Sita. Lava ruled south Kosala while Kusha ruled north Kosala, including Ayodhya. Kusha married the naga princess Kumudvati, the sister of Kumuda. After Kusha, the following kings of the solar dynasty ruled Ayodhya:
- Śuddhodana, leader of the Shakya republic in present-day Nepal, with their capital at Kapilavastu. He was also the father of Buddha, who later became the Buddha.
- Sumitra, the last king of Ayodhya from the Raghuvaṃśa, defeated by Mahapadma Nanda.

== See also ==
- Hinduism
- Solar dynasty
- Lunar dynasty
- Mahabharata
- Puranic chronology
- List of Ikshvaku dynasty kings
- List of Hindu empires and dynasties
