= Rangapura Vihara =

Popular Carnatic song

"Rangapura Vihara" is a popular Carnatic song composed in Sanskrit by Muthuswami Dikshitar (1776-1835) and dedicated to Sri Ranganathaswamy of Srirangam.

== History ==
The title of the song means one who roams (vihara) in Srirangam (Rangapura), a temple town in Tamil Nadu, India. It details the exploits of the Lord Rama, whose family deity is Ranganatha of Srirangam. The most famous version of this song was rendered by M.S.Subbulakshmi, live at the United Nations. It has a pallavi, anupallavi and charanam.

== Lyrics ==
Raṅgapura Vihāra

- Ragam: Brindāvana Sārangā
- Aaroha: Sa Re2 Ma1 Pa Ni3 Sa
- Avaroha: Sa Ni2 Pa Ma1 Re2 Ga2 Re2 Sa
- Tālam: rūpakaṃ
- Composer: Muttuswāmy Dikshitar
- Language: Sanskrit

pallavi
rahngapura vihāra jaya kodandarāmāvatāra raghuvIra shrI

anupallavi
ahngaja janaka deva brndāvana sārahngendra varada ramāntarahnga shyāmalahnga vihahnga turahnga sadayāpāhnga satsahnga

charanam
pahnkajāptakula jalanidhi sOma vara pahnkaja mukha pattābhirāma padapahmkaja jitakāma raghurāma vamahnka gata sItāvara vesa shesāhnka shayana bhakta Santosa enāhnkaravi nayana mrdutarabhāsa akakahnka darpana kapola vishesa muni sankaTaharana govinda venkata ramana mukunda sankarSana mula kanda shankara guruguhānanda

=== Poetic rendition in English ===
==== Pallavi ====
Victory to the divine Rama, the courageous hero of the Raghu dynasty, Residing in the colored city of Rangapura.

==== Anupallavi ====
The one who enchants the heart of Janaka's daughter Sita, With his beautiful dark blue form like a peacock, He who is always surrounded by devotees.

==== Charanam ====
He who is like the moon in the ocean of the illustrious Janaka's lineage, Adorning himself with the radiance of lotus-like face, Whose feet dispel all desires, Who reclines on the serpent bed, The delight of his devotees.

His gentle eyes are like lotus petals, His soft and sweet words captivate everyone, His forehead is adorned with the divine mirror, He is the dispeller of troubles, The beloved of Govinda, Venkata, and Raman, Mukunda, Sankarshana, the root of all creation, Shankara, the spiritual teacher, and Guha Ananda.

=== Lyrics in Devanagari ===
पल्लवि

रङ्ग पुर विहार जय कोदण्ड – (मध्यम काल साहित्यम्)

रामावतार रघुवीर श्री

अनुपल्लवि

अङ्गज जनक देव बृन्दावन सारङ्गेन्द्र वरद रमान्तरङ्ग

(मध्यम काल साहित्यम्) श्यामळाङ्ग विहङ्ग तुरङ्ग सदयापाङ्ग सत्सङ्ग

चरणम्

पङ्कजाप्त कुल जल निधि सोम वर पङ्कज मुख पट्टाभिराम

पद पङ्कज जित काम रघु राम वामाङ्क गत सीता वर वेष

शेषाङ्क शयन भक्त सन्तोष

एणाङ्क रवि नयन मृदु-तर भाष

अकळङ्क दर्पण कपोल विशेष मुनि – (मध्यम काल साहित्यम्)

सङ्कट हरण गोविन्द वेङ्कट रमण मुकुन्द सङ्कर्षण मूल कन्द शङ्कर गुरु गुहानन्द

=== Lyrics in Tamil Script ===
பல்லவி

ரெங்கபுர விஹார ஜெய கோதண்ட- (மத்யம் கால் சாகித்யம்)

ராமாவதர ரகுவீர ஸ்ரீ |2|

அனுபல்லவி

அங்கஜ் ஜனக் தேவ் பிருந்தாவன் சர்கேந்திர வரத் ராமந்திரங் (மத்தியம் கால் சாகித்யம்) |2|

சரணம்

பங்கஜாத குல ஜல நிதி சோம்வர் பக்ஜ் முகப் பட்டாபிராம்

படகாஜ் ஜித் காமா ரகு ராம்

வாமாக் கத சீதா வர வேஷ்

சேஷாங்க ஸயன பக்த சந்தோஷ

ஏணாங்க ரவி நயன தர பாஷ

அகளங்க தர்பண கோபால விேஸஷ முனி - (மத்யம கால ஸாஹித்யம்)

ஸங்கட ஹரணகோவிந்த வேங்கட ரமண முகுந்த ஸங்கர்ஷண முல கந்த சங்கர குரு குஹானந்த||

=== తెలుగు సాహిత్యం ===
పల్లవి: రంగపుర విహార జయ కోదండ- రామావతార రఘువీర శ్రీ

అనుపల్లవి: అంగజ జనక దేవ బృందావన సారంగేంద్ర వరద రమాంతరంగా శ్యామలాంగ విహంగ తురంగ సదయాపాంగ సత్సంగ

చరణం: పంకజాప్త కుల జల నిధి సోమ వర పంకజ ముఖ పట్టాభిరామ పద పంకజ జిత కామ రఘురామ వామాంక గత సీత వర వేష శేషాంక శయన భక్త సంతోష ఏణాంక రవి నయన మృదు-తర భాష అకళంక దర్పణ కపోల విశేష ముని- సంకట హరణ గోవింద వేంకటరమణ ముకుంద సంకర్షణ మూల కంద శంకర గురు గుహానంద

=== ಕನ್ನಡ ಸಾಹಿತ್ಯ ===
ರಂಗಪುರ ವಿಹಾರ ಜಯ ಕೋದಂಡ ರಾಮಾವತಾರ ರಘುವೀರ ಶ್ರೀ ||

ಅಂಗಜ ಜನಕದೇವ ಬೃಂದಾವನ ಸಾರಂಗೇಂದ್ರ ವರದ ರಮಾಂತ ರಂಗ | ಶ್ಯಾಮಲಾಂಗ ವಿಹಂಗ ತುರಂಗ ಸದಯಪಾಂಗ ಸತ್ಸಂಗ ||

ಪಂಕಜಾಪ್ತಕುಲ ಜಲನಿಧಿ ಸೋಮ ವರ ಪಂಕಜ ಮುಖ ಪಟ್ಟಾಭಿರಾಮ ಪಂಕಜ ಜಿತಕಾಮಾ | ರಘುರಾಮ ವಾಮಾಂಕ ಗತ ಸೀತಾವರ ವೇಷ ಶಾಂಕ ಶಯನ ಭಕ್ತ ಸಂತೋಷ ಏನಾಂಕರವಿನಯ| ಮೃದುತರ ಭಾಷಾ ಕಳಂಕ ದರ್ಪಣ ಕಪೋಲ ವಿಶೇಷ ಮುನಿ ಸಂಕಟ ಹರಣ | ಗೋವಿಂದ ವೇಂಕಟರಮಣ ಮುಕುಂದ ಸಂಕರ್ಷಣ ೂಲಕಂದ ಶಂಕರ ಗುರುಗುಹಾನಂದ ||
