= Raghava =

Raghava (Sanskrit rāghava "descendant of Raghu") may be

- Raghuvamsha, referring to the Solar dynastic lineage of Raghu in Hindu mythology
- a name of the Hindu deity Rama
- in the dual, Rama and Lakshmana
- Raghava Rama, the name of a Vaishnava mantra associated with Chaitanya Mahaprabhu
- Raghava Iyengar (1878–1960), Indian poet and scholar of Tamil
- Pendyal Raghava Rao (born 1917), Indian parliamentarian
- Raghava Lawrence (born 1971), Indian choreographer who has also appeared in films as an actor, director, composer and playback singer
- Raghava Reddy, philanthropist & businessman from Kurnool, Andhra Pradesh, India
- Raghav (actor), Indian actor
- Raghav (singer), Indo-Canadian singer

== See also ==
- Raghavan (disambiguation)
- Raghavaiah (disambiguation)
- Raghu (disambiguation)
