= Raghuveer =

Raghuveer may refer to:

- Rama, Hindu deity, the veer (hero) of the Raghu dynasty
- Raghuveer (actor) (1963–2014), Indian film actor and director in Kannada films
- Raghuveer Bharam, Indian painter
- Raghuveer Chaudhari, Indian novelist
- Raghuvir Meena, Indian Member of Parliament from Udaipur constituency in Rajasthan
- Raghuveer Narayan (1884–1955), Indian poet and freedom fighter
- Raghuveer Parthasarathy (born 1976), Indian-American biophysicist
- Raghuveer Singh Koshal, Indian Member of Parliament from Kota constituency of Rajasthan
- Raghuvir Yadav or Raghubir Yadav (born 1957), Indian film, stage and television actor, music composer, singer and set designer
- Raghuveer, a fictional antagonist in the 2009 Indian film Magadheera, played by Dev Gill

== See also ==
- Raghuvir (disambiguation)
- Raghubir, alternative form of the Indian male given name
- Raghu Veera Reddy, Indian politician
