= Aja of Kosala =

King in Hinduism

Aja
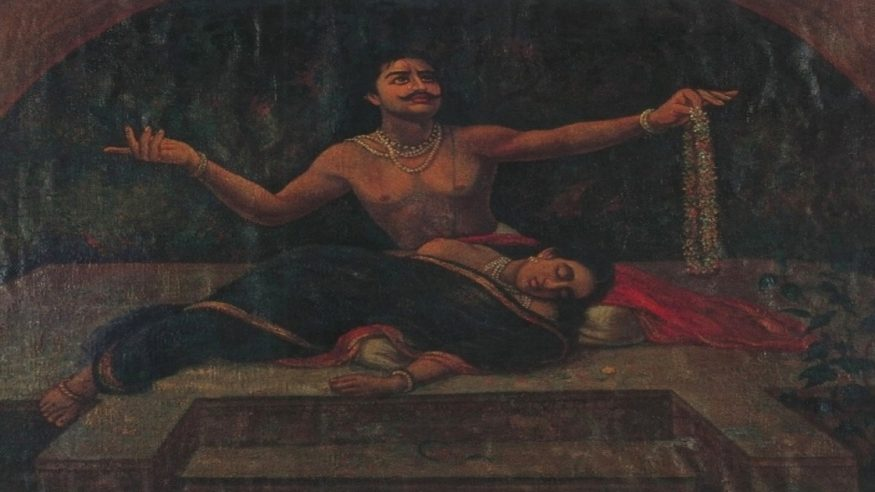
- Lamentations of Aja by Raja Ravi Varma

Maharaja of Kosala
- Predecessor: Raghu
- Successor: Dashratha
- Born: Ayodhya, Kingdom of Kosala (present-day Uttar Pradesh, India)
- Died: Ayodhya, Kingdom of Kosala (present-day Uttar Pradesh, India)
- Consort(s): Indumati
- Issue: Dashratha
- Dynasty: Suryavamsha
- Father: Raghu
- Religion: Vedic Hinduism

Aja (Sanskrit: अज, romanized: Aja) is a king featured in Hindu texts. He is the son of Raghu. His paternal grandfather is the pious king Dilipa. He rules the kingdom of Kosala on the southern banks of the river Sarayu, with Ayodhya as his capital. His wife Indumati is the princess of Vidarbha, and his son is Dasharatha, the father of Rama, an avatar of the Hindu deity Vishnu.

The name Aja is referenced in the Rigveda. In the second phase of Battle of Ten Kings (in RV 1.018.19), the local chieftain Bhida is stated to have been defeated along with three other tribes – Ajas, Śighras, and the Yakṣus by Sudas.

== Legend ==
Indumati used to be an apsara, a celestial damsel named Harini, in her previous birth. Once, Indra grew apprehensive of the rigorous penance practiced by the sage Trinabindu, and sent her against him for disrupting his penance. By exhibiting in front of him her attractive form, she succeeded in interrupting his penance. As a result, the enraged sage cursed her to be born as a mortal woman on earth, and remain there till she beholds celestial flower on the earth. In due course, she was born as a princess of Vidarbha, and chose king Aja as her husband during her svayamvara. Soon, Dasharatha was born to them. However, her time on earth soon came to its end. Once, while sage Narada was traversing the sky, a garland of his veena fell on Indumati, redeeming her from the curse. Regaining the form of an apsara, she vanished from the earth, leaving Aja behind. King Dasharatha was only eight months old when Indumati died.

King Aja was left grief-stricken and heartbroken.Kalidasa's Raghuvamsha states that Vashishtha sent his student to console him. Aja, however, never recovered from his pain, and after having ruled for a few more years, he died.
