= Erasmo Pèrcopo =

Italian philologist (1860–1928)

Erasmo Pèrcopo (26 February 1860, in Naples – 19 January 1928, in Naples) was an Italian philologist and literary critic who specialised in humanists from the Kingdom of Naples, particularly Jacopo Sannazaro and Giovanni Pontano. He graduated from the University of Naples Federico II where he studied under Francesco D'Ovidio and Michele Kerbaker.
