= Raghavan =

Raghavan is a South Indian name. It derives from the Sanskrit raghava, meaning "derived from Raghu" or "descendant of Raghu" (an epithet of the Hindu god Rama, an incarnation of Vishnu), plus the Tamil-Malayalam third-person masculine singular suffix -n. Although it is used as a given name in India it has also come to be used as a family name in the United States.

It may refer to:

== People ==
- Azhikodan Raghavan – Indian Communist politician
- Edappally Raghavan Pillai – Indian poet (1909-1936)
- K. Raghavan – Indian musical artist
- K. Raghavan Pillai – writer and scholar of Kerala, India
- M. K. Raghavan – Indian politician (born 1952)
- M. V. Raghavan – Indian politician
- Muthukulam Raghavan Pillai – Indian author
- N. S. Raghavan – Indian businessman
- P. Raghavan – Indian Communist politician (1945–2022)
- P. K. Raghavan – Indian politician
- P. M. Raghavan – Indian cricketer
- Pa. Raghavan – Tamil writer
- Prabhakar Raghavan – American computer scientist
- Radha Raghavan – Indian politician (born 1961)
- Raghavan N. Iyer – Indian academic, political theorist, and philosopher (1930–1995)
- Ramnad Raghavan – Indian musician (1927–2009)
- Raghavan (actor) – Indian actor (born 1941)
- M. R. Srinivasaprasad – Indian cricketer (born 1959)
- Srinivasacharya Raghavan – Indian mathematician (1934-2014)
- Sriram Raghavan – Indian film director and screenwriter
- Sumeet Raghavan – Indian Actor (born 1971)
- Suren Raghavan – Sri Lankan academic and politician
- Raghavan Thirumulpad – Ayurvedic scholar and practitioner (1920–2010)
- T. E. S. Raghavan – Indian mathematician (born on August 05, 1940)
- V. R. Raghavan – Indian Army officer
- V. S. Raghavan – Tamil actor (1925–2015)

== Asteroids ==
- 24149 Raghavan, asteroid

== Films ==
- Raghupathi Raghavan Rajaram, a 1977 Indian Tamil-language film
- A character in 2006 Indian film Vettaiyaadu Vilaiyaadu
- Kanneganti Raghavan, a character in the Indian KGF (film series)
- Veera Raghavan, the name of the protagonist in the Indian Tamil-language film Beast

== See also ==
- Raghava (disambiguation)
