= Raghu (disambiguation) =

Raghu was a ruler of the Indian Ikshvaku dynasty.

Raghu may also refer to

- Raghu (given name), an Indian name
  - Rahman (actor) (born 1967), known as Raghu, Indian actor
- Raghu Engineering College in Andhra Pradesh, India
- Raghu Romeo, a 2003 Bollywood film
- Rama Rama Raghu Rama, a 2011 Indian Kannada-language film
- Raghuvamsha Sudha, a popular kriti in Carnatic music
- Raghu, a fictional character played by Sanjay Dutt in the Indian films Vaastav (1999) and Hathyar (2002)

== See also ==
- Ragu (disambiguation)
- Raghuramaiah (disambiguation)
- Raghunath (disambiguation)
- Raghuvamsha (disambiguation)
- Raghuvir (disambiguation)
- Raghava (disambiguation)
