= Honeymoon Se Hatya =

2026 Indian true crime documentary series

- Genre: True crime Documentary
- Created by: Mrunalini Havaldar
- Written by: Satyen Bordoloi
- Directed by: Ajitesh Sharma
- Starring: Anurekha Bhagat; Sushmita
- Country of origin: India
- Original language: Hindi
- No. of seasons: 1
- No. of episodes: 6

Production
- Producers: Aditya Pittie; Samar Khan
- Running time: 45 minutes

Original release
- Network: ZEE5
- Release: January 9, 2026

Honeymoon Se Hatya (transl. hi – transl. Murder from the Honeymoon) is a 2026 Indian Hindi-language true crime documentary series directed by Ajitesh Sharma. Produced by Aditya Pittie and Samar Khan, the series premiered on ZEE5 on 9 January 2026. The docuseries explores high-profile criminal cases in India where wives were accused of murdering their husbands, examining the psychological, social, and emotional factors behind the crimes.

== Premise ==
The series is a six-part docudrama that investigates the motivations behind domestic homicides. Rather than focusing solely on the forensic details, it delves into the "silent battles" within marriages, including themes of control, suppression, and emotional trauma. Each episode utilizes factual narration, archival footage, and dramatic recreations, alongside interviews with investigators and journalists.

== Featured cases ==
The series covers five major real-life cases that captured national media attention in India:

- The Meerut Blue Drum Case: Based on the murder of Saurabh Rajput, whose body was found dismembered and hidden in a cement-filled blue drum in Meerut, Uttar Pradesh.
- The Meghalaya Honeymoon Murder: Follows the disappearance and murder of Raja Raghuvanshi during his honeymoon.
- The Mumbai Tile Case: Investigates a case in Nalasopara where a body was concealed behind wall tiles.
- The Delhi Electric Shock Case: Explores a murder involving simulated accidental electrocution.
- The Bhiwani Influencer Case: Focuses on the murder of a social media influencer in Haryana.

== Production ==
The series was announced in January 2026 as part of ZEE5's expansion into the true crime genre. It was written by Satyen Bordoloi.

== Release ==
A teaser for the series was released on 6 January 2026. The series began streaming globally on ZEE5 on 9 January 2026.

== Reception ==
The series received mixed reviews from critics. OTTplay rated it 3/5 and wrote that the series' raw, fact-led treatment and the inclusion of interviews with families and police officers add emotional weight, though its promised psychological analysis remains underdeveloped.

Writing for The Times of India, Archika Khurana rated the first season 3/5, describing it as authentic and well-researched with visual realism, but said the execution is uneven and falls short of a truly penetrating psychological study.

In Aaj Tak, Shikhar Negi rated the series 2/5, noting that it largely revisits cases that were extensively covered in the news and offers few new revelations, while also arguing that its attempt to explain motives through psychological framing feels incomplete.

TheJBT similarly wrote that while the subject matter and choice of cases are compelling, the series is less effective at offering fresh insights and does not fully answer its central question about why the crimes occurred.

== See also ==
- Indian Predator
- House of Secrets: The Burari Deaths
