= Carlo Formichi =

Italian linguist and orientalist

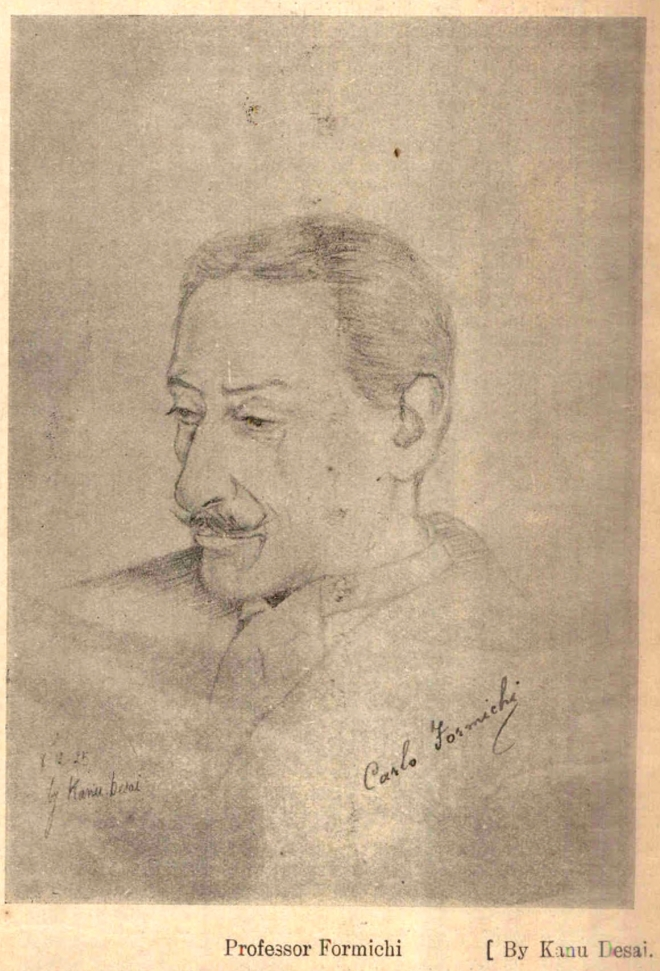
- Drawn by Kanu Desai
- Born: 14 February 1871; Naples
- Died: 13 December 1943 (aged 72); Rome
- Occupation: Indologist

Carlo Formichi (14 February 1871 – 13 December 1943) was an Italian linguist, Anglicist, orientalist, and Sanskrit scholar. He took a keen interest in Buddhism and Hindu philosophy.

Formichi was born in Naples and became interested in Sanskrit, studying from Michele Kerbaker, even before he went to university. He however studied law, graduating in 1891 and then studied literature, receiving a degree in 1893. He taught at a gymnasium in the Calabria region and after receiving a scholarship he went to the University of Kiel for oriental studies under Paul Deussen and Hermann Oldenberg. He attended orientalists' congresses at London (1892) and Paris (1897). Graduating in 1897 he returned to Naples where he taught Sanskrit philology and spent some time in Vienna and at Bologna under J. G. Bühler. He joined the university of Pisa in 1898 and became a head in 1915 at the University of Rome where he dealt also in English literature. In the 1920s Kalidas Nag (son-in-law of Ramananda Chatterjee) and Sylvain Levi began to spread an interest in Indology in Europe. Nag was in touch with many Indologists including Giuseppe Tucci and Formichi. Through Nag's influence 1925 Formichi was invited to Vishwabharati University. This was the same period when Rabindranath Tagore was invited to Italy through the influence of Formichi. Tagore grew openly against Fascism while Formichi was a staunch supporter of Mussolini. After Tagore made many public statements against fascism, Formichi was forced to write a book explaining his position India e Indiani. Formichi visited Egypt in 1928 and Berkeley in 1929. He took an interest in Indian and Buddhist philosophy, and translated several works including the Asvaghosa into Italian. He retired in 1941. He was professor of Sanskrit at the University of Pisa and, from 1914, at the University of Rome.

== Works ==
- Salus Populi (Welfare of the People) (Turin 1908)
- Açvaghoṣa, poeta del Buddhismo (1912)
- Pensiero e azione nell' India antica (Thought and Action in Ancient India) (Rivista Italiana di Sociologia March-April 1914) - A Lecture delivered in 1914 at the University of Rome
- La Stirpe Di Raghu (Raghuvaṃśa, The Race of Raghu) (Milan, 1917)
- Il penseroso religioso nell' India prima del Buddha (1926)
- I viaggi di Gulliver (Gulliver's Travels) (Mondadori, 1933)
