= Raghavaiah =

Raghavaiah or Raghavayya (Telugu: రాఘవయ్య) is one of the Indian personal names.

- Kosaraju Raghavaiah was a Telugu poet and writer.
- Vedantam Raghavayya was veteran Telugu film actor, choreographer, director and producer.
- Vennelakanti Raghavaiah was an Indian freedom activist and Social worker.

== See also ==
- Raghava (disambiguation)
