= Rahu (disambiguation) =

Rahu is one of the navagrahas (nine planets) in Vedic astrology.

Rahu may also refer to:

- Rahu, Saaremaa, a village in Valjala Commune, Saare County, Estonia
- Rahu River, a river in the Tasman Region, South Island, New Zealand
- Renters and Housing Union, a syndicalist tenants' union based in Australia

== See also ==
- Ruha, queen of the World of Darkness in Mandaeism
