= Raghbir Singh =

Raghbir Singh may refer to:

- Raghbir Singh Panjhazari (1914–1999), Indian politician
- Raghbir Singh (chief minister) (1895–1955), Indian politician
- Raghbir Singh Bhola (1927–2019), Indian Air Force officer and field hockey player
- Raghbir Singh Pathania (1874–1915), British Indian Army officer

== See also ==
- Raghubir Singh (disambiguation)
- Raghbir Lal, Indian field hockey player
- Raghbir Mhajan, Indian tennis line judge
