= Murder of Raja Raghuvanshi =

2025 murder of an Indian man by his wife in Meghalaya

- Location: Sohra, Cherrapunji, Meghalaya, India
- Date: 23 May 2025
- Attack type: Disappearance, suspected homicide
- Motive: Unknown
- Inquiry: Meghalaya Police, Special Investigation Team (SIT)

Raja Raghuvanshi
- Born: 1996; Indore, Madhya Pradesh, India
- Died: 23 May 2025 (aged 28—29); Sohra, Meghalaya, India
- Known for: Victim in the Raja and Sonam Raghuvanshi case
- Parents: Ashok Raghuvanshi (father); Uma Raghuvanshi (mother)

Sonam Raghuvanshi
- Born: 2000 (age 25–26); Indore, Madhya Pradesh, India
- Known for: Central figure in the Murder of Raja Raghuvanshi
- Criminal charges: Alleged hiring of contract killers; murder conspiracy
- Criminal status: Arrested (June 2025), accused of orchestrating husband’s murder

On 23 May 2025, Raja Raghuvanshi (29) and Sonam Raghuvanshi (25), a married Indian couple from Indore, Madhya Pradesh, disappeared while on their honeymoon in Meghalaya. The couple was last seen on the same day, hours after checking out of a homestay at Nongriat village in Cherrapunji (Sohra). On 2 June 2025, Raja’s decomposed body was discovered in a deep gorge beneath the Wei Sawdong Falls in Sohra. His death has been treated as a suspected homicide and a Special Investigation Team was formed by Meghalaya police to probe the case. Initially treated as a suspected accident or abduction, the case took a dramatic turn when Sonam was arrested on charges of orchestrating her husband's murder. According to the Meghalaya Police, Sonam allegedly hired contract killers and plotted Raja’s murder during the trip. The investigation is ongoing and has sparked widespread media coverage and public debate.

== Background ==
Raja and Sonam Raghuvanshi were married on 11 May 2025 and left Indore for Meghalaya on 20 May to begin their honeymoon. On 22 May, the couple arrived at Mawlakhiat village near Cherrapunji (Sohra) and trekked about 3,000 steps down to the famous double-decker living root bridge at Nongriat, where they stayed overnight. The next morning (23 May), they checked out of the homestay and began to return toward Mawlakhiat. No further in-person sightings of the couple were reported after they left Nongriat, and all contact was lost later on 23 May.

== Disappearance ==
On 23 May 2025, Raja and Sonam Raghuvanshi failed to arrive at their next destination and went missing. Their family filed a missing persons report on 23 May after failing to establish contact. Phone records indicate that Sonam made a final call to her mother around 1:43 PM on 23 May; both phones were switched off after that call. The following day (24 May), the couple’s rented scooter was found abandoned at a roadside café on the Shillong–Sohra road. Search efforts by family and local authorities began immediately, but no trace of the couple was found that day.

== Discovery of Raja Raghuvanshi's body ==
Search operations continued into early June 2025. On 2 June, a National Disaster Response Force (NDRF) drone spotted Raja Raghuvanshi’s body at the base of a gorge under the Wei Sawdong Falls in Sohra. The body was badly decomposed; Raja’s brother identified him by a tattoo on his right hand. The East Khasi Hills district police confirmed that Raja’s body had been recovered and registered a murder case in the incident. A Special Investigation Team (SIT) was established to investigate the circumstances of his death. Police noted that Sonam’s whereabouts remained unknown and the search for her was ongoing.

== Investigation and search ==
Police investigators found several personal effects at the site where Raja’s body was recovered, including a woman’s white shirt, a strip of medicine blister pack, part of a mobile phone screen, and a smartwatch. Officers later announced that they had recovered a bloodstained weapon believed to have been used in the killing, and a black raincoat was found in nearby Mawkma village. The raincoat bore wet stains, but Superintendent Vivek Syiem said it was too early to tell if they were blood; forensic tests were needed to determine their nature. The search operation faced difficult conditions: NDRF teams deployed ropes and rappelling gear at the Wei Sawdong viewpoint to reach the gorge, but poor visibility and slippery terrain forced them to suspend the descent multiple times. Despite these challenges, teams recovered new evidence and reviewed CCTV footage to trace the couple’s last movements. Raja’s family has publicly questioned the circumstances of his death. His brother Vipin Raghuvanshi demanded that the case be handed over to the Central Bureau of Investigation (CBI), alleging that foul play had not been adequately investigated. Family members noted that Raja and Sonam had been wearing gold jewelry (rings, chain, bracelet, etc.) that were missing when Raja’s body was found, suggesting the possibility of theft and murder. Sonam’s relatives have urged authorities not to give up hope of finding her alive; Sonam’s brother Govind Raghuvanshi stated that he believed she was still in captivity and called for intensified search efforts and a CBI probe. Chief Minister of Meghalaya, Conrad Sangma expressed shock at the incident and assured the public that the state government was fully supporting the police investigation. On 6 June 2025, a local guide claimed to have seen Raja and Sonam with three unidentified men near the Wei Sawdong viewpoint on 23 May, the day of their disappearance.

== Discovery of Sonam Raghuvanshi ==
On 9 June 2025, the Meghalaya Police arrested Sonam Raghuvanshi, the wife of the deceased Raja Raghuvanshi, on charges of conspiracy to murder. Authorities alleged that Sonam orchestrated her husband's killing by hiring three contract killers during their honeymoon in Meghalaya. Investigations revealed that one of the alleged conspirators, Raj Singh Kushwaha, was reportedly Sonam's lover and worked at her brother’s firm in Madhya Pradesh. The police recovered CCTV footage, mobile records, and witness accounts, including that of a local guide who claimed to have seen the couple accompanied by three unidentified men shortly before Raja’s disappearance. Sonam was apprehended in Ghazipur, Uttar Pradesh, after remaining missing for over two weeks, and was later transferred to Meghalaya for custodial interrogation. The case attracted national media attention, prompting responses from both families: Raja’s mother demanded capital punishment for those involved, while Sonam’s father rejected the police’s narrative and called for a CBI investigation. Four individuals have been arrested in connection with the case, while a fifth suspect remains at large.

== Reaction ==
Chum Darang commented on Raja's murder and how Northeast Indians faced discrimination.

The case was featured in an episode of the 2026 ZEE5 true crime series Honeymoon Se Hatya.

== See also ==
- Men's rights movement in India
- Murder of Anni Dewani
