= Michele Kerbaker =

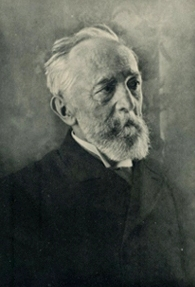
Michele Kerbaker

Michele Kerbaker (10 September 1835 – 20 September 1914) was an Italian linguist and translator who dealt in Latin, Greek, and Sanskrit. He was a teacher at various high schools including at the Principe Umberto high school in Naples before becoming a professor of philology and literature in the University of Naples.

Kerbaker was born in Turin where he was raised by an uncle after the death of his mother and his father's remarriage. He studied at the provincial college before joining the University of Turin where he received a degree in 1857. He moved to Naples where he taught Latin and Greek at Mondovì, Ivrea and Parma before joining the Umberto I lycaeum. While in Naples he studied Sanskrit under Giacomo Lignana. When Lignana moved to Rome in 1870 he moved to the Collegio Asiatico and began to teach Sanskrit. He also translated several classical Sanskrit works into Italian for the first time. These included the Rigveda, a part of the Ramayana (which had already been translated by Gaspare Gorresio), and a summary of the Mahabharata with extensive introductions to some parts including the Bhagvadgita. Kerbaker's students included Carlo Formichi.

Kerbaker was admitted into the Lincean Academy of Rome in 1907. In 1873 he married Assuta Bucci, artist and translator of works in English. They had four sons and two daughters. Kerbaker died in Naples where a street in Vomero is named after him. He was buried in Turin with honours.
