= Ramaiah =

Ramaiah or Ramayya is an Indian name. Notable people with the name include:

- Chukka Ramaiah (born 1925), Indian educationist
- Relangi Venkata Ramaiah (1910–1975), Indian actor, comedian, and producer
- M. S. Ramaiah (1922–1997), Indian educationist, philanthropist, and industrialist
- V. Ramaiah, Indian politician
- Kailasa Venkata Ramiah, an educationist from India
- Ramayya Krishnan, an Indian American Management and Information technology scholar from Pittsburgh, Pennsylvania.
