= Wei Sawdong Falls =

Waterfall in Meghalaya, India

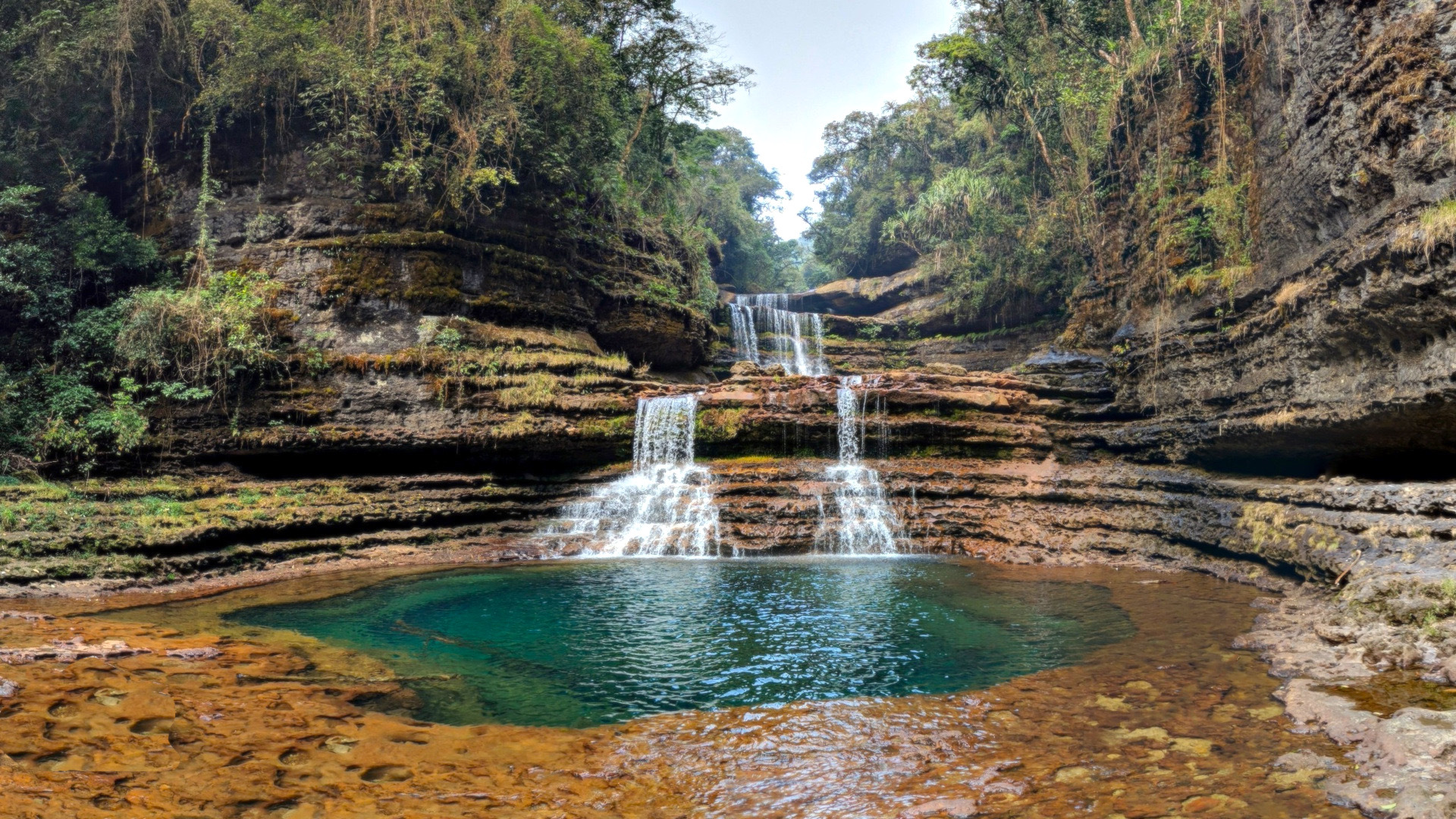
- Wei Sawdong Falls

- Location within Meghalaya Location within India
- Location: Cherrapunji, East Khasi Hills, Meghalaya, India
- Coordinates: 25.2912308°N 91.6783496°E
- Type: Tiered (3 tiered)
- Elevation: 51 m (167 ft)

Wei Sawdong Falls is a three-tiered waterfall located in Cherrapunji, Meghalaya.

== Location ==
The fall is situated some 60 km southwest of Shillong in East Khasi Hills district and is in close proximity to another major waterfall, Dainthlen Falls. The name Wei Sawdong derives from the Khasi language (wei - resembling a pool, sawdong - square-shaped), spoken locally.

Wei Sawdong is difficult to access, and the trek to the waterfall is along an out-and-back trail and challenging. The falls are especially known for their bluish-green, crystal-clear water.

== Gallery ==
Wei Sawdong Waterfall
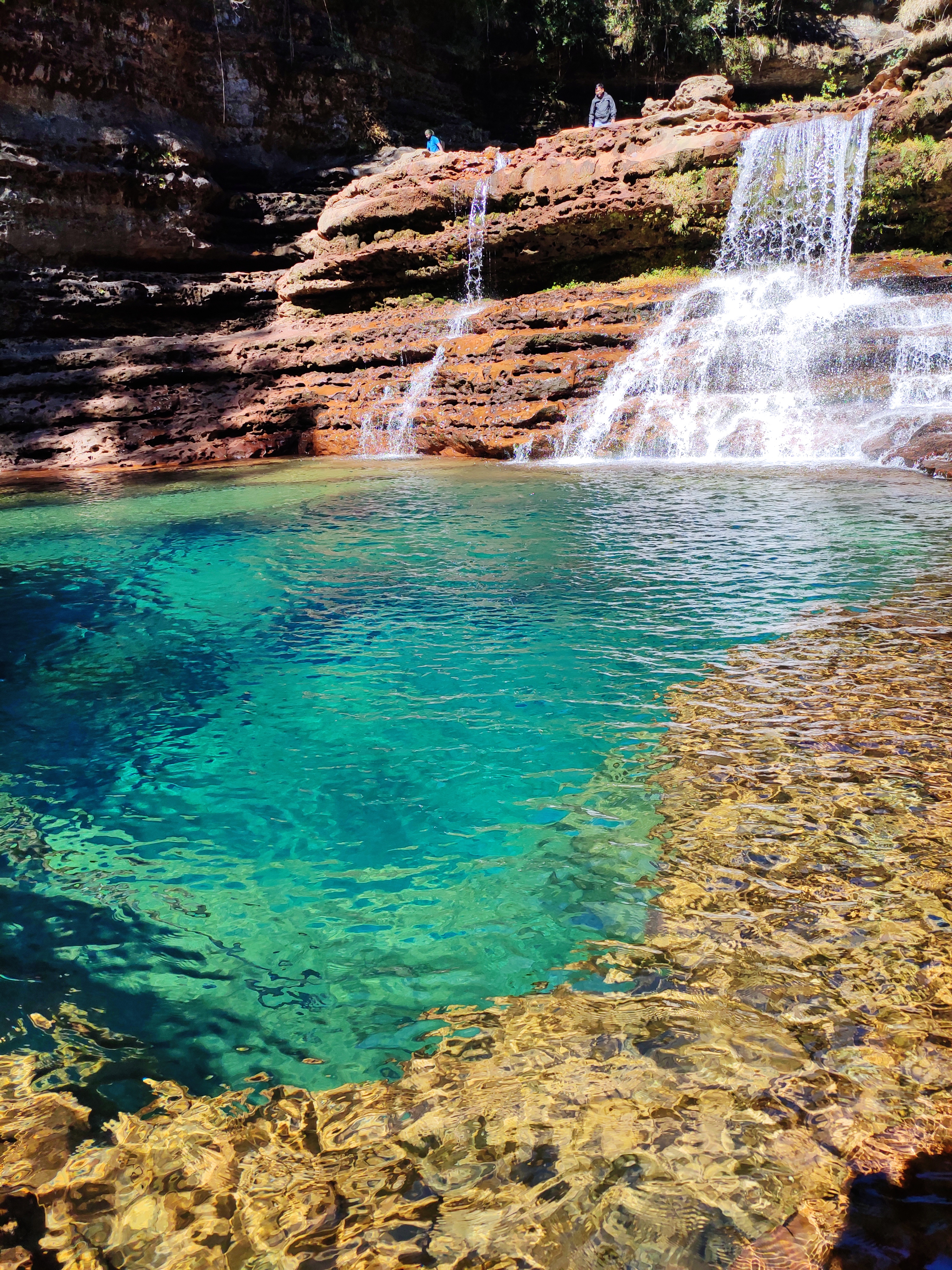
Wei Sawdong waterfall in Cherrapunji, Meghalaya

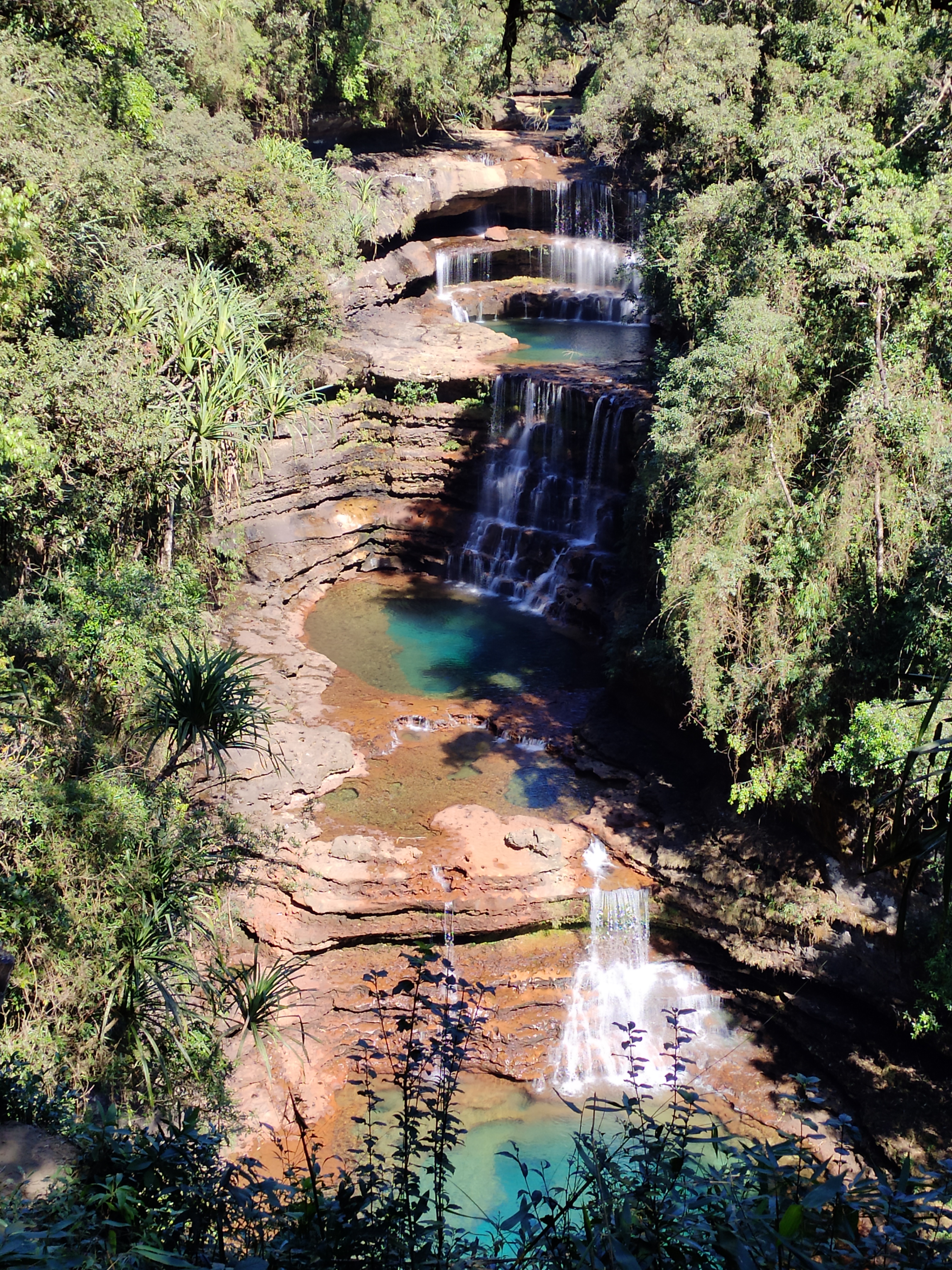
Wei Sawdong waterfall in Cherrapunji, Meghalaya (aerial view)

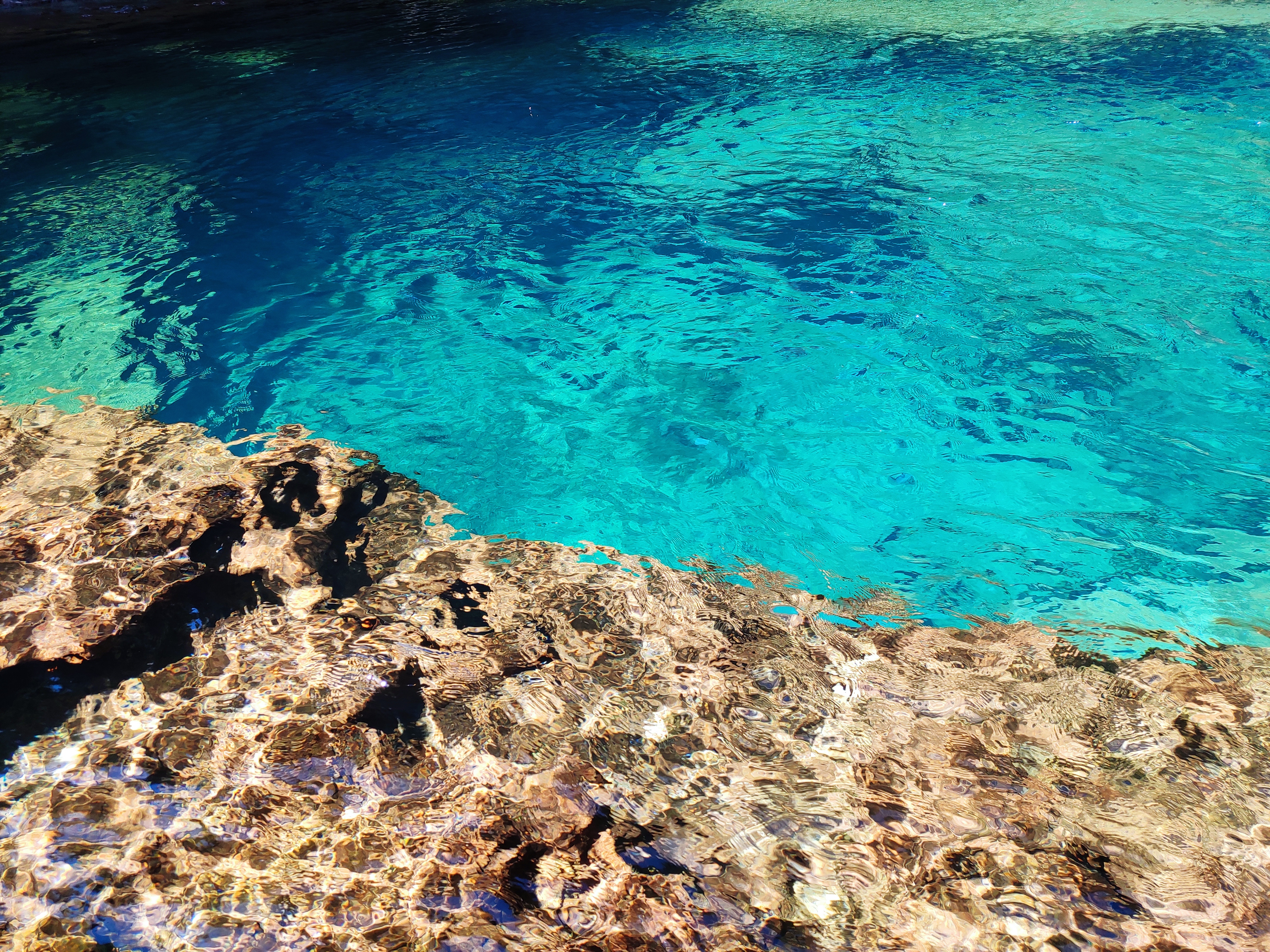
Crystal-clear water of Wei Sawdong waterfall

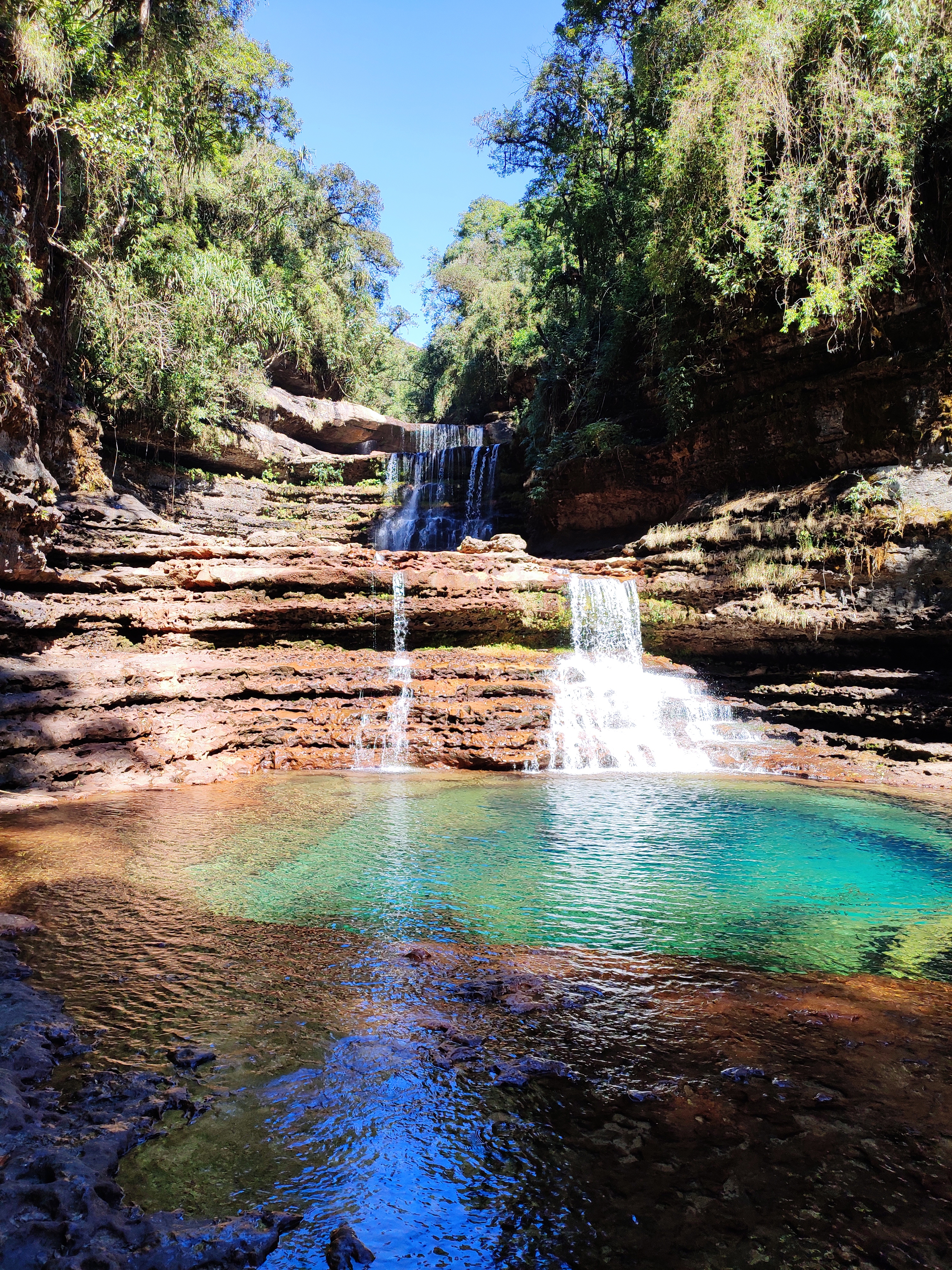
Wei Sawdong waterfall

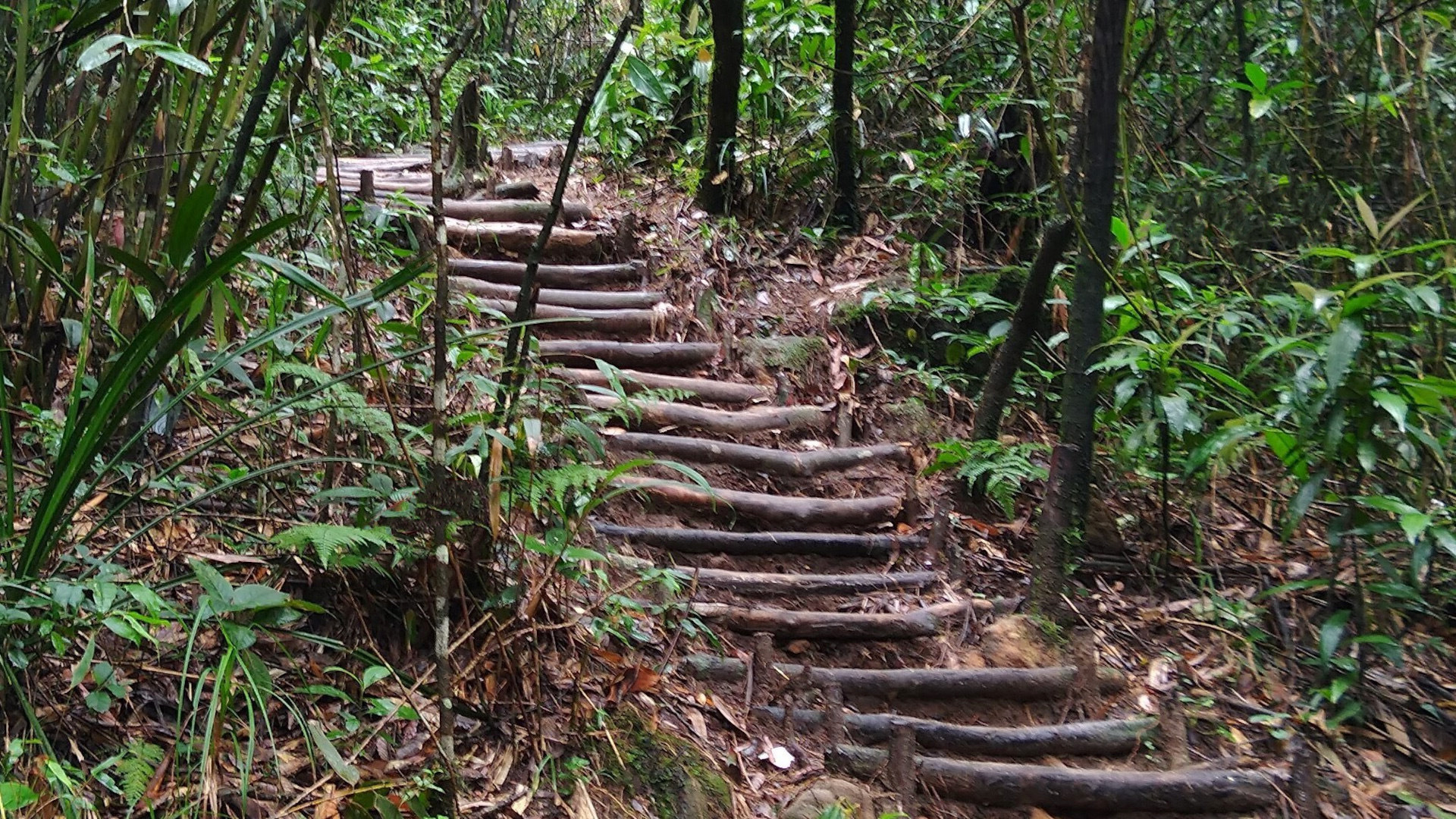
Trekking trail, Wei Sawdong waterfall

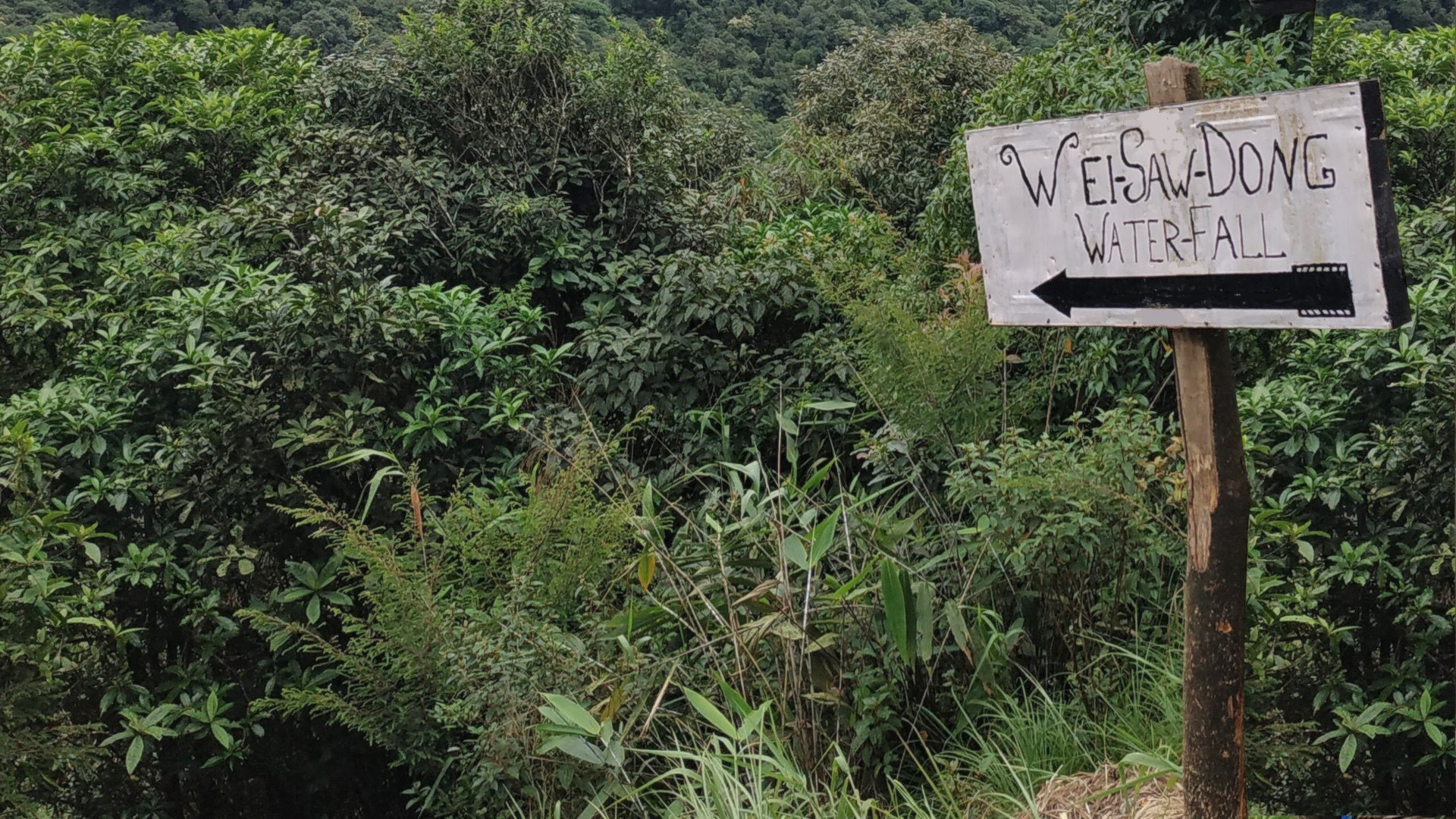
Trekking trail signboard, Wei Sawdong waterfall

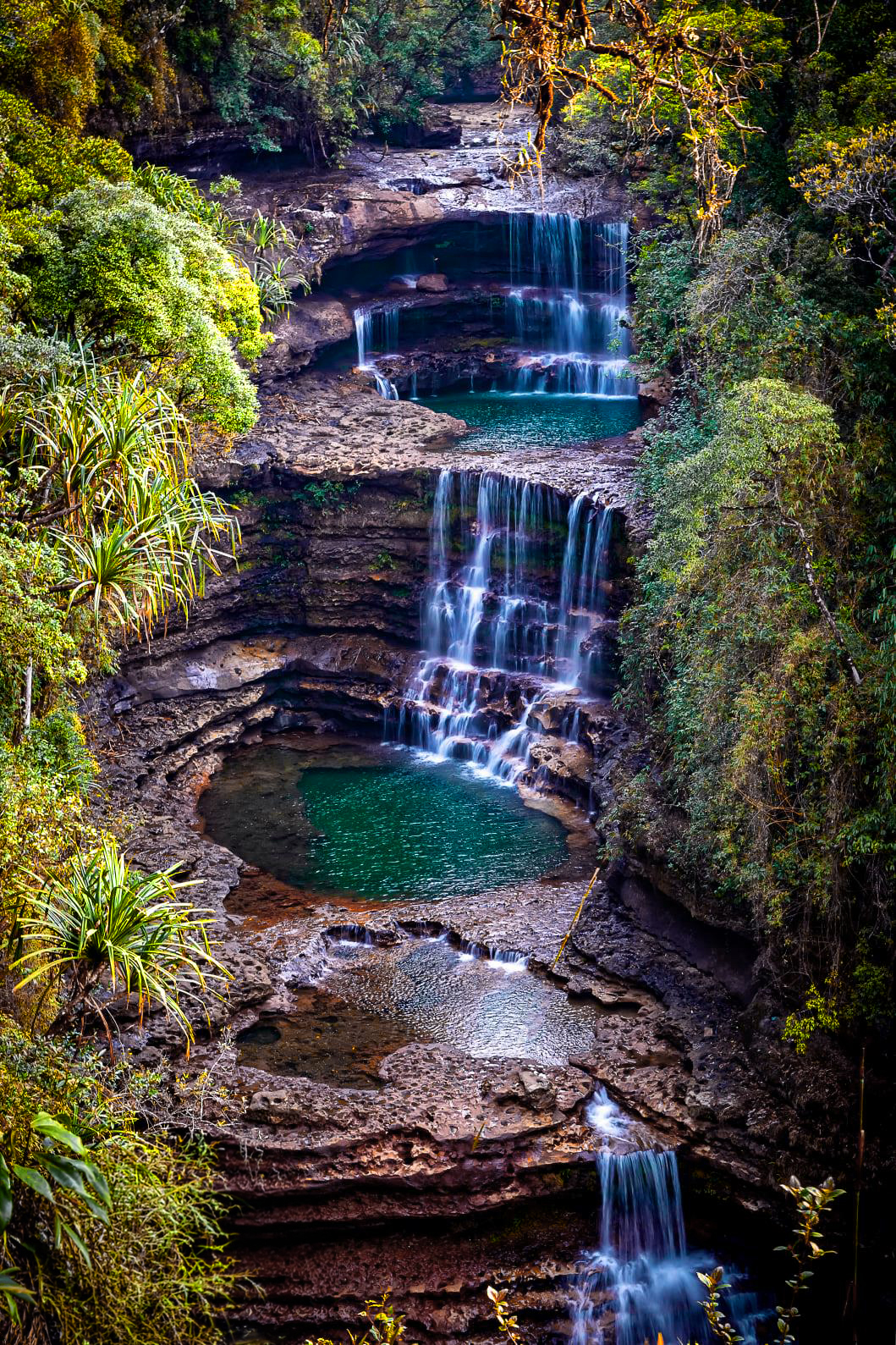
Wei Sawdong Falls is a three-tiered waterfall

== See also ==
- List of waterfalls
- List of waterfalls in India
