= Raghubir Singh (photographer) =

Indian photographer

- Born: 22 October 1942; Jaipur, India
- Died: 18 April 1999 (aged 56); New York, US
- Occupation: Photographer
- Years active: 1965–1999
- Notable work: Ganga: Sacred River of India (1974); River of Colour: The India of Raghubir Singh (1998)
- Style: Documentary, street
- Website: www.raghubirsingh.com

Raghubir Singh (1942–1999) was an Indian photographer, most known for his landscapes and documentary-style photographs of the people of India. He was a self-taught photographer who worked in India and lived in Paris, London and New York. During his career he worked with National Geographic Magazine, The New York Times, The New Yorker and Time. In the early 1970s, he was one of the first photographers to reinvent the use of color at a time when color photography was still a marginal art form.

Singh belonged to a tradition of small-format street photography, working in color, that to him, represented the intrinsic value of Indian aesthetics. According to his 2004 retrospective his "documentary-style vision was neither sugarcoated, nor abject, nor controllingly omniscient". Deeply influenced by modernism, he liberally took inspiration from Rajasthani miniatures, Mughal paintings and Bengal, a place where he thought western modernist ideas and vernacular Indian art were fused for the first time, as reflected in the works of the Bengal school and the humanism of filmmaker Satyajit Ray. "Beauty, nature, humanism and spirituality were the cornerstones of Indian culture" for him and became the bedrock for his work.

Singh published 14 well-received books on the Ganges, Calcutta, Benares, his native Rajasthan, Grand Trunk Road, and the Hindustan Ambassador car. Today, his work is part of the permanent collections of the Art Institute of Chicago, the Metropolitan Museum of Art and Museum of Modern Art in New York and the Tokyo Metropolitan Museum of Photography, amongst others.

== Early life and education ==
Singh was born into an aristocratic Rajput family in 1942 in Jaipur. His grandfather was Commander-in-chief of the Jaipur Armed Forces, while his father was a Thakur or feudal landowner of Khetri (now in Jhunjhunu district, Rajasthan). After independence, his family saw a dwindling of its fortune. As a schoolboy, he discovered Beautiful Jaipur, Cartier-Bresson's little-known book published in 1948, which inspired his interest in photography.

After his schooling at St. Xavier's School, Jaipur, he joined the Hindu College (Delhi) but dropped out in his first year. It was here that he took a serious interest in photography.

== Career ==
=== Photographer ===
Singh first moved to Calcutta to begin a career in the tea industry, as had his elder brother before him. This turned out to be unsuccessful, but by this time, he had started to take photographs. In Calcutta, Singh met the historian R. P. Gupta, who later contributed text for his first book Ganges (1974). Singh was gradually introduced to a circle of city artists who deeply influenced his later work, especially the realism of filmmaker Satyajit Ray, who later designed the cover of his first book and wrote the introduction to his Rajasthan book. This also set a precedent for literary input in his future books, as in the coming years the writer V. S. Naipaul conducted a dialogue with him for the preface to his book Bombay (1994), while R. K. Narayan wrote the introduction to Tamil Nadu (1997).

By the mid-1960s, Life Magazine had published eight pages of his photographs about student unrest. He later moved to Hong Kong and started doing photo features for National Geographic Magazine, The New York Times...

After a decade of travelling along the Ganges, Singh published his first book Ganges in 1974, with an introduction by Eric Newby. Though his early work was inspired by Henri Cartier-Bresson's documentary-style photographs of India, he chose colour as his medium, responding to the vivid colours of India, and over time adapted western techniques to Indian aesthetics.

In the 1970s, Singh moved to Paris and over the following three decades, through rigorous training and exposure, he created a series of portfolios of colour photography on India. His style was influenced by Mughal painting and Rajasthani miniature paintings, whose individual sections maintain their autonomy within the overall frame.

In his early work, Singh focused on the geographic and social anatomy of cities and regions in India. His work on Bombay in the early 1990s marks a turning point in his stylistic development.

Singh published over 14 books. In the last of these, A Way into India (2002), published posthumously, the Ambassador car in which he travelled on all his journeys across Indian since 1957 becomes a camera obscura. Singh uses its doors and windshield to frame and divide his photographs. In the accompanying text, John Baldessari compares Singh to Orson Welles for his juxtaposition of near and far and to Mondrian for his fragmentation of space.

=== Teacher ===
In addition to his photographic work, Singh taught in New York at the School of Visual Arts, Columbia University and Cooper Union.

== Awards ==
- 1983: Padma Shri, by Government of India
- 1986–1987: First Fellowship in Photography of the National Museum of Photography, Bradford
- 1999: Mother Jones Lifetime Achievement Award
- 2001: Maharaja Sawai Ram Singh Award (posthumously)

== Personal life ==
In 1972, he married Anne de Henning, also a photographer, and the couple had a daughter, Devika Singh, who is curator at the Tate Modern and holds a position at Cambridge University.

Singh died on 18 April 1999 of a heart attack. Upon his death, the art critic Max Kozloff wrote, "If you can imagine what a Rajput miniaturist could have learned from Henri Cartier-Bresson, you'll have a glimmer of Raghubir Singh's aesthetic."

== Rape Allegations ==
On 3 December 2017, artist Jaishri Abichandani organized a protest outside the Met Breuer, where Singh's "Modernism on the Ganges" opened as an exhibit on 11 October 2017. Abichandani alleges that Singh sexually assaulted her in the mid-1990s while on a trip to India where she accompanied him as an assistant. She claims to have been under the impression that the trip was a professional one, and that she made her non-consent known.

== Publications ==
- Ganga: Sacred River of India (1974), Perennial, Bombay
- Calcutta (1975), (preface by Joseph Lelyveld), Perennial, Bombay
- Rajasthan (1981), (preface by Satyajit Ray) Thames and Hudson, London and New York; Chêne, Paris; Perennial, Bombay. ISBN 0-500-54070-5.
- Kumbh Mela (1981), Arthaud, Paris; Perennia, Bombay
- Kashmir: Garden of the Himalayas (1983), Thames and Hudson, London and New York; Perennia, Bombay
- Kerala: The Spice Coast of India (1986), Thames and Hudson, London and New York; Chêne, Paris. ISBN 0-500-24125-2.
- Banaras: The Sacred City of India (1987), Thames and Hudson, London and New York Chêne, Paris
- Calcutta: the home and the street (1988), Thames and Hudson, London and New York; Chêne, Paris. ISBN 0-500-24133-3.
- The Ganges (1992), Thames and Hudson, London and New York; Aperture, New York (Japanese, German and Italian editions)ASIN B01FKS7IC4.
- Bombay: Gateway to India (1994), (conversation with V.S. Naipaul), Aperture, New York; Perennia, Bombay. ISBN 0-89381-583-7.
- The Grand Trunk Road (1995), Aperture, New York; Perennia, Bombay
- Tamil Nadu (1997), (preface by R.K. Narayan), DAP, New York. ISBN 1-881616-66-5
- River of Colour: The India of Raghubir Singh (1998, 2000, 2006), Phaido, London (2000 French and German editions). ISBN 0-7148-3996-5.
- A Way into India (2002), Phaido, London. ISBN 9780714842110.

== Exhibitions ==
In 1998, the Art Institute of Chicago organized a retrospective exhibition of his work, which was still on display at the time of his death. The book River of Colour was published on the occasion of this exhibition.

In February 1999, what had been intended as a mid-career retrospective exhibition of his work opened at the National Gallery of Modern Art, New Delhi, after showing at the Bon Marché in Paris and the Art Institute of Chicago.

=== Solo exhibitions ===
- 1983 Williams College Museum of Art, Williamstown
- 1983 Museum of Photographic Arts, San Diego
- 1984 Museum of Art, Rhode Island School of Design
- 1984 Fogg Art Museum, Harvard University, Cambridge
- 1984 Duke University, Durham
- 1985 University of California Museum, Berkeley
- 1985 Pace McGill Gallery, New York
- 1987 Arnolfini Gallery, Bristol
- 1987 National Museum of Photography, Bradford
- 1989 Arthur M. Sackler Gallery, Smithsonian Institution, Washington DC
- 1991 Center for Creative Photography, Tucson, Arizona
- 1992 Dallas Museum of Art, Dallas, Texas
- 1992 Sewall Art Gallery, Houston, Texas
- 1992 Piramal Gallery, National Center for Performing Arts, Bombay
- 1994 Piramal Gallery, National Center for Performing Arts, Bombay
- 1994 Burden Gallery, Aperture Foundation, New York
- 1995 Max Mueller Bhawan, New Delhi
- 1998 Feature Inc., New York
- 1999 National Gallery of Modern Art, Bombay
- 1999 National Gallery of Modern Art, New Delhi
- 1999 The Art Institute of Chicago
- 2001 The Museum of Photography, Tel-Hai
- 2002 Foundation Querini Stampalia, Venice
- 2003 Arthur M. Sackler Gallery, Smithsonian Institution, Washington DC
- 2004 Sepia Gallery, New York
- 2005 National Museum of Photography, Bradford
- 2005 Galerie f5.6, Munich
- 2005 Paris Photo
- 2006 Lille 3000: Colysée de Lambersart
- 2006 Lille 3000: Maison Folie, Wazemmes
- 2008 The Gallery at Hermès, New York and Berlin (with Dayanita Singh)
- 2017 The Met Breuer, New York (Modernism on the Ganges: Raghubir Singh Photographs)

== Public collections ==
- Tate Modern, London
- Museum of Modern Art, New York (MoMA)
- Metropolitan Museum of Art, New York
- Philadelphia Museum of Art, Philadelphia
- Art Institute of Chicago
- Hirshhorn Museum and Sculpture Garden, Washington DC
- Arthur M. Sackler Gallery, Smithsonian Institution, Washington DC
- San Francisco Museum of Modern Art
- Museum of Modern Art, Oxford
- Centro per l'arte contemporanea Luigi Pecci, Prato
- Williams College Museum of Art, Williamstown
- National Media Museum, Bradford
- Tokyo Metropolitan Museum of Photography
- Los Angeles County Museum of Art (LACMA)
