= Raghubir =

Raghubir may refer to:

- Raghubir Yadav, Indian actor
- Raghubir Singh (photographer) (1942–1999), Indian photographer
- Raghubir Singh (equestrian), Indian equestrian
- Raghubir Singh of Jind (1834–1887), Raja of Jind of the Phulkian dynasty
- Raghubir Singh of Bundi (1869–1927), Raja of Bundi
- Raghbir Singh Bhola (born 1928), Indian field hockey player
- Raghubir Mahaseth, Nepalese politician
- Raghubir Sinh, Indian politician
