= Raghuvaṃśa =

5th century Sanskrit poem by Kalidasa

- by Kalidasa
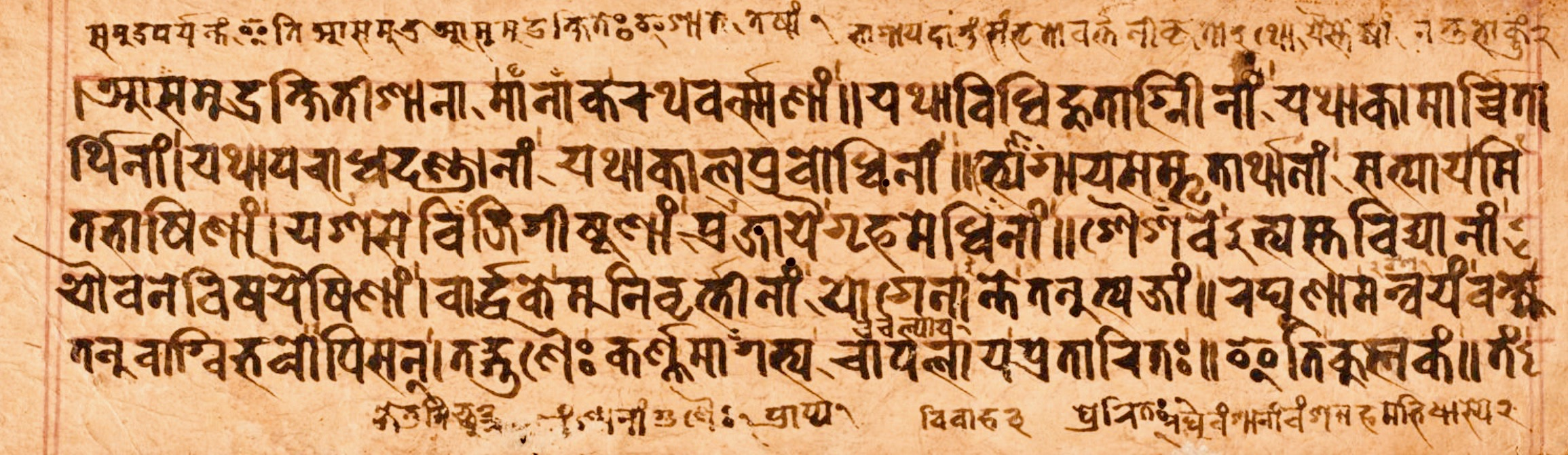
- 17th-century manuscript copy in Prachalit Nepal script from Nepal (Currently at Cambridge University Sanskrit Manuscript Collection)
- Original title: रघुवंशम्
- Language: Sanskrit
- Subject: Raghu dynasty
- Genre: Religious (Hindu)
- Publication date: 5th century CE

Raghuvaṃśa (Devanagari: रघुवंशम्, lit. 'lineage of Raghu') is a Sanskrit epic poem (mahakavya) by the celebrated Sanskrit poet Kalidasa. Though an exact date of composition is unknown, the poet is presumed to have flourished in the 5th century CE. It narrates, in 19 sargas (cantos), the stories related to the Raghu dynasty, namely the family of Dilipa and his descendants up to Agnivarna, who include Raghu, Dasharatha and Rama.

The earliest surviving commentary written on the work is that of the 10th-century Kashmiri scholar Vallabhadeva. The most popular and widely available commentary, however, is the Sanjivani, written by Mallinatha (ca.1350–1450).

== Contents ==
The Raghuvaṃśa is a mahākāvya (roughly, epic poem) containing 1564 stanzas. It describes the line of kings of the Raghu dynasty (also known as the sūryavaṃśa or the solar dynasty) that includes Raghu. It is written in 19 sargas (cantos), that can be regarded as being divided into three parts:

- Ancestors of Rāma: Dilīpa, Raghu, Aja, and Daśaratha (Cantos 1 to 9)
- The story of the Ramayana (Cantos 10 to 15)
- Descendants of Rāma (Cantos 16 to 19)

=== Dilīpa (Cantos 1, 2) ===
Canto 1 – King Dilīpa's journey to Vasiṣṭha's hermitage

The work begins with a prayer:

vāgarthāviva saṁpṛktau vāgarthapratipattaye /
jagataḥ pitarau vande pārvatīparameśvarau //

To Parvati and Parameshvara,

the parents of the world, who are united like word and meaning, I pray, for the gift of speech fit with appropriate meaning.

— translation

The initial stanzas express the poet's humility and the greatness of the dynasty, following which King Dilipa and his reign are described. Dilipa has one great sorrow, that he has no child. With his queen Sudakshina he journeys to the hermitage of the sage Vasiṣṭha to seek advice. Vasiṣṭha reveals that King Dilipa had once offended the divine cow Surabhi and had been cursed by her, and instructs him to care for her daughter calf, Nandini.

Canto 2 – King Dilipa and the calf Nandini

The king spends his days in service of the calf, accompanying it on its wanderings and protecting it from danger. One day a lion appears, and when Dilipa raises his hand to draw an arrow and protect the calf, he finds himself magically frozen. He begs the lion to take his own life instead of the calf's, even in the face of the lion's arguments against doing so, after which this is all revealed to be an illusion and Nandini grants him a boon of having a son. He returns with his queen to his capital.

=== Raghu (Cantos 3, 4, 5) ===
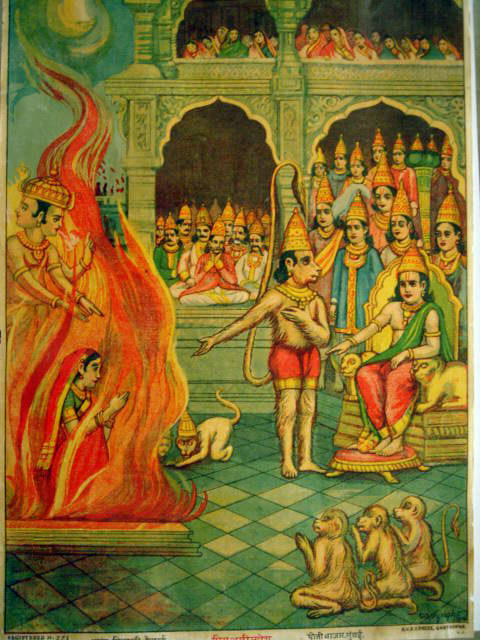
The Raghuvaṃśa

Canto 3 – Raghu is born, grows up, and becomes king

Queen Sudakshina gives birth to a baby boy who is named Raghu. The boy's childhood and education are described. When his father the king Dilipa performs the Ashvamedha yajña and the god Indra captures his wandering horse, Raghu fights Indra who is impressed with him. His father crowns him king, and retires to the forest.

Canto 4 – Raghu as king, and his conquest

The reign of Raghu is described. He sets out in all four directions to conquer, and in this chapter much of India is described.

Canto 5 – Raghu's gift to Kautsa, and the birth and youth of Aja

Just after Raghu has performed a sacrifice and given away all his wealth, a freshly graduated student named Kautsa arrives and asks him for an immense amount of wealth, to give as guru-dakshina to his teacher. To grant his wish, Raghu resolves to go to war against the god of wealth Kubera himself, and just as he resolves to do so, Kubera rains a shower of gold to fill his treasury. Both Raghu, who presses on Kautsa much more than he asked, and Kautsa, who accepts nothing more than what he needs to repay his teacher, win praise from all the people.

A son is born to Raghu and is named Aja, who grows into adulthood and goes to the svayamvara of princess Indumati.

=== Aja and Indumati (Cantos 6, 7, 8) ===
Canto 6 – Indumati's svayamvara

Many princes from all regions are at Indumati's svayamvara hoping to be chosen by her. Their qualities and kingdoms are described. Indumati passes by many of them, and finally chooses Aja.

Canto 7 – Aja's wedding and ambush

Aja is married to Indumati, but on his way home he is attacked by the disappointed rival princes. He defeats them all and returns home, at which his father Raghu crowns him king and retires to the forest.

Canto 8 – Indumati's death and Aja's lament

Indumati gives birth to a son Dasharatha. One day, Indumati is killed by a freak accident (when a garland of flowers falls on her), and Aja laments at length on losing her. He lives in grief for eight years till his son comes of age, then gives up his body and is reunited after death with his wife.

=== Dasharatha (Canto 9) ===
Canto 9 – Dasharatha, and the accidental death of Shravana Kumara

The reign of King Dasharatha and his three queens is described. Once he goes hunting in the forest, during which a fatal hunting accident takes place: Dasharatha kills a boy, and is cursed by the boy's parents that he too will in old age die of grief for his son.

=== Rama (Cantos 10 to 15) ===
These cantos 10 to 15 tell the story of the Ramayana, but the parts from Valmiki well known to Indian readers are abridged.

Canto 10 – The gods pray to Vishnu, who is incarnated as Rama

The gods, tormented by Ravana, pray to Vishnu. Dasharatha performs a yajña and is blessed with four children: Rama, Lakshmana, Bharata and Shatrughna.

Canto 11 – Sita's svayamvara, and the defeat of Parashurama

Rama and Lakshmana accompany the sage Vishvamitra and kill the demon Tataka. They arrive at Mithila, where at the svayamvara of princess Sita, Rama strings and breaks the bow, and is married to her. On their way back to Ayodhya they encounter Parashurama, and Rama emerges victorious in this challenge.

Canto 12 – Rama exiled, Shurpanakha humiliated, Sita kidnapped, and Ravana killed

This canto narrates the story of most of the Ramayana (its kāṇdas 2 to 6) in short, ending with the death of Ravana in Lanka at the hands of Rama.

Canto 13 – The return by aerial route

From Lanka, Rama and Sita return to Ayodhya in the Pushpaka Vimana, and as they fly through the air, Rama points out to Sita many points of interest on the ground.

Canto 14 – Sita's exile

On their return to Ayodhya, Rama is crowned king, and their joy increases when Sita becomes pregnant. She expresses a wish to see the forest again. But on hearing that the people of the kingdom murmur about the queen's character, Rama after some internal struggle decides to exile his beloved wife. He asks Lakshmana to leave Sita in the forest. She is devastated, but taken care of by the sage Valmiki.

Canto 15 – The birth of Rama's sons, and the passing of Rama

In the sage's hermitage, Sita gives birth to two sons Lava and Kusha, who grow up and are taught the Ramayana by Valmiki. As they grow into youths, they come into the presence of Rama, who learns they are his children, and then Sita chooses to be swallowed up by the earth, her mother. Rama divides the kingdom among his brothers and children, and himself ascends to heaven.

=== Descendants of Rama (Cantos 16 to 19) ===
Canto 16 – Kusha's return to Ayodhya and marriage

One night, Kusha is visited by the deity of the now-abandoned city Ayodhya, who begs him to return to it. He does so, and there he marries Kumudvati.

Canto 17 – King Atithi

Kusha's son is Atithi, and his reign is described.

Canto 18 – Later kings

The dynasty continues, with a line of twenty-one kings who succeeded Atithi.

Canto 19 – Agnivarna

The last described king, Agnivarna, gives in to a hedonistic life of pleasure, leaving the kingdom to his ministers to run. Even when he is required to make a presence before his subjects, he merely hangs his left foot out of a window. This canto serves as contrast to the earlier cantos describing glorious kings. He is consumed by disease and dies. His pregnant queen mounts the throne, and the people hope for a better future.

== Geographical and historical references ==
The march of warrior Raghu originated in western Asia with a military expedition to Transoxiana. He defeats and subjugates local people along the way (presumably on his march through Central Asia) until he reaches the Vakshu, as the ancient Indians called the Oxus River. There, Raghu's army battles the Hepthalites, or White Huns, whom the Indians called Hunas and Mlecchas (barbarians). The Hepthalites are defeated, and the Raghuvaṃśa boasts of "The exploits of Raghu, whose valor expressed itself amongst the husbands of the Huna women, became manifest in the scarlet colour of their cheeks." The march continued afterwards towards Persia.

After crossing the Oxus, Raghu and his army encountered the Kambojas, an ancient Indo-Scythian people often mentioned in Indian texts. The Kambojas submitted to Raghu and offered him gifts and treasures. Evidently, the Kambojas dwelt in the vicinity of the Pamirs. Kalidasa describes the preponderance of walnut trees in the Oxus country, this particular region is still known for the cultivation of walnuts.

== Metres used in the epic ==
The epic is composed in 21 Sanskrit metres, namely Anuṣṭubh, Indravajrā, Upajāti, Upendravajrā, Aupacchandasika, Toṭaka, Drutavilambita, Puṣpitāgrā, Praharṣiṇī, Mañjubhāṣiṇī, Mattamayūra, Mandākrāntā, Mālinī, Rathoddhatā, Vaṃśastha, Vasantatilakā, Vaitālīya, Śārdūlavikrīḍita, Śālinī, Svāgatā, Hariṇī.

== Editions and translations ==
The Raghuvaṃśa has been published many times and translated into several languages as under :-

- Ṣaṅkara Paṇḍuraṅga Paṇḍit (1869), The Raghuvam̃śa of Kâlidâsa: with the commentary of Mallinātha, Government Central Depôt. Part 1: Cantos 1-6(Alt), Part 3: Cantos 14-19
- Parab (1888) The Raghuvamsha of Kâlidâsa: with the commentary of Mallinatha
- English prose translation (author unknown) in Kalidasa: Works, South Asia Books, 1901
- P. de Lacy Johnstone (1902). The Raghuvança . London: J. M. Dent and Co. – via Wikisource.
- Arthur W. Ryder (1914), Translations of Shakuntala, and Other Works (113 verses are translated, the rest are summarised in prose)
- Carlo Formichi (1917), La Stirpe Di Raghu (Italian translation)
- M. R. Kale (ed, 1922), The Raghuvamsa of Kalidasa: with the commentary (the Samjivani) of Mallinatha; Cantos I-X
- Rewa Prasad Dwivedi (ed, 1973), Raghuvaṃśa-Darpaṇa: Raghuvaṃśa commentary by Hemādri, Vol 1 (Cantos 1–12) Vol 2 (Cantos 13–19)
- Tapasvi Nandi (ed, 1989), Jinasamudra's commentary on the Raghuvaṃśa of Kālidāsa
- The Lineage of the Raghus (2024), edited and translated by Csaba Dezső, Dominic Goodall, and Harunaga Isaacson
- Louis Renou (1928), La Lignee des Fils du Soleil : Le Raghuvamsha de Kalidasa, Les Belles Lettres, Paris (translation in French).
- Otto Walter (1914), Raghuvamsha Oder Raghus Stamm, (German translation)

== See also ==
- Indian literature
- Sanskrit literature
- Sanskrit drama
- Chandragupta Vikramaditya
- Gupta Empire
- Kamba Ramayanam
