= Dilīpa =

King featured in the Ramayana

- Predecessor: Mulaka
- Successor: Raghu

Genealogy
- Parents: Mulaka (father); llibila (mother)
- Spouse: Sudakshina
- Children: Dhirghabahu
- Dynasty: Suryavamsha

Dilīpa, also known as Khaṭvāṅga, is a king of the Ikshvaku dynasty featured in Ramayana (and in other Hindu texts). Dilipa is the son of Krishakarma, the husband of Sudakshina, and the father of Raghu. Dilipa is also the name of a serpent born into the Kashyapa family.

== Legend ==
=== Meeting with Vasishtha ===
One day, Dilipa met the sage Vasishtha on the banks of the Ganga river (Ganges). Vasishtha taught Dilipa about all the sacred waters and explained to him how each were great. This legend is found in the Padma Purāṇa.

=== Killing of Virasena ===
The Yuddha Kandam of the Ramavataram mentions the killing of Virasena, in which Dilipa is involved. Once an asura named Virasena attacked Kubera; however, the gods Shiva and Vishnu were unable to defeat him. Vishnu told Kubera to seek the help of the king Dilipa, who came to Kubera's mythical city of Alaka. Dilipa fired arrow after arrow at Virasena, but every drop of blood spilled caused the formation of a new Virasena. To finish the unending battle, Dilipa prayed to the goddess Rakteshwari, who came and drank all the blood of Virasena, allowing for his death.

=== Birth of Raghu ===
The Padma Purāṇa and Uttarā Kāṇḍa of the Rāmāyaṇa mention the tale of the birth of Raghu. Dilipa was a noble, popular ruler who was married to Sudakshina, the princess of Magadha; however, he had no progeny. He and Sudakshina decided to go to the sage Vasishta in order to receive advice on how to obtain a child. At Vasishta's ashrama, he told the couple that the reason they had no children was because they had slighted the divine cow Kamadhenu. He stated that once when Dilipa was visiting the god Indra, he had passed Kamadhenu but paid no attention to her. Kamadhenu took this as a personal insult, and cursed Dilipa so that he would not have any children until he served and propitiated Kamadhenu's daughter, Nandini. Vasishta told Dilipa and Sudakshina that Nandani had gone to Patala to attend a sacrifice of the god Varuna. For the next twenty-one days, Dilipa and Sudakshina followed and attended on Nandini as she traversed Patala. One morning Nandini went to graze in a forest, and as usual Dilipa followed her. However, when Dilipa was focused on the beautiful wooden scenery, a lion jumped out and attacked Nandini. Dilipa aimed his bow and arrow at the lion to fire, but he was paralysed. The lion told Dilipa that he was a servant of the god Shiva, and that he had been ordained to protect a divine deodar cedar tree that had been planted by Shiva's wife, Parvati. The lion stated that he was allowed to eat any animals that came near the deodar cedar tree, and so was justified in eating Nandini. Dilipa fell to his knees and bowed to the lion, and begged the lion to eat him rather than Nandini. Suddenly, the lion disappeared and Nandini revealed that she had done this to test Dilipa. After successfully propitiating Nandini, Dilipa and Sudakshina returned to the earthly realm and had a son named Raghu.

=== Life as a Royal Hermit ===
One day, Dilipa pleased God so much that he realized how long he had to live. He then left his royal duties to his ministers and spend the rest of his life in devotion and meditation. He performed 105 sacrifices, in which he made golden roads and was even visited by the god Indra. This description is found in the Bhāgavata Purāṇa and the Droṇa Parva of the Mahābhārata, where he is referred to as Khaṭvāṅga.

== See also ==
- Ramayana
