= Raghu =

Hindu mythological king

Maharaja of Kosala
- Predecessor: Dilīpa (dheerghabahu)
- Successor: Aja
- Born: Ayodhya, Kingdom of Kosala (present-day Uttar Pradesh, India)
- Died: Ayodhya, Kingdom of Kosala (present-day Uttar Pradesh, India)
- Issue: Aja
- Dynasty: Suryavamsha
- Father: Dilīpa
- Mother: Sudakshina
- Religion: Vedic Hinduism

Raghu (Sanskrit: रघु, romanized: Raghu, lit. 'Quick') is a ruler of the Suryavansha dynasty in Hinduism. According to the Raghuvamsha, he is the son of King Dilīpa and Queen Sudakshina. The history of his dynasty is elaborated upon by the poet Kalidasa in his Raghuvamsha. He is the great-grandfather of Rama, an avatar of Vishnu.

== Legend ==
=== Raghuvamsha ===
The life and glories of Raghu are described in the poem Raghuvamsha, written by Kalidasa. In the third canto, his birth, education, and marriage are described. He participates in the hundredth ashvamedha sacrifice of his father, fighting Indra, who steals the sacrificial horse. His victory against the deity is followed by his ascension to the throne, after Dilipa retires to the forest. In the fourth canto, Raghu expands his domains, subjugating the kings of Vanga, Utkala, Kalinga, the Pandya king, Huns, Persians, and Pragjyotisha.

On the instruction of his guru, Vashistha, he performs the Viśvajit yajna, giving away all his wealth as dāna. After being impoverished, Sage Kautsa, a disciple of Vartantu, comes to Raghu, seeking 14 koti (million) gold coins as a gurudakshina. Expressing his inability to offer the sum, Raghu plans to plunder Kubera's treasury for wealth. When the deity catches wind of this, he willingly fills the king's coffers with a rain of gold coins, which Raghu promptly offers to Kautsa. Pleased, the sage blesses Raghu to bear a son, and soon, Aja is born. After he comes of age, Raghu sends his son to attend the svayamvara of Princess Indumati of Vidharba, whom he successfully weds. The story of Raghu ends in the eighth canto, where he retires to the forest after nominating Aja as the king.

== Lineage ==
A number of Puranas, which include the Vishnu Purana, the Vayu Purana, the Linga Purana, mention Dirghabahu as the son of Dilīpa and Raghu as the son of Dirghabahu. But the Harivamsha, the Brahma Purana and the Shiva Purana mention Raghu as son of Dilīpa and Dirghavahu as his epithet.

Raghu Ikshvaku dynasty Born: - Died: -
Preceded by Dilīpa	King of Kosala	Succeeded by Aja
