= Prachetas =

Term in Hindu mythology

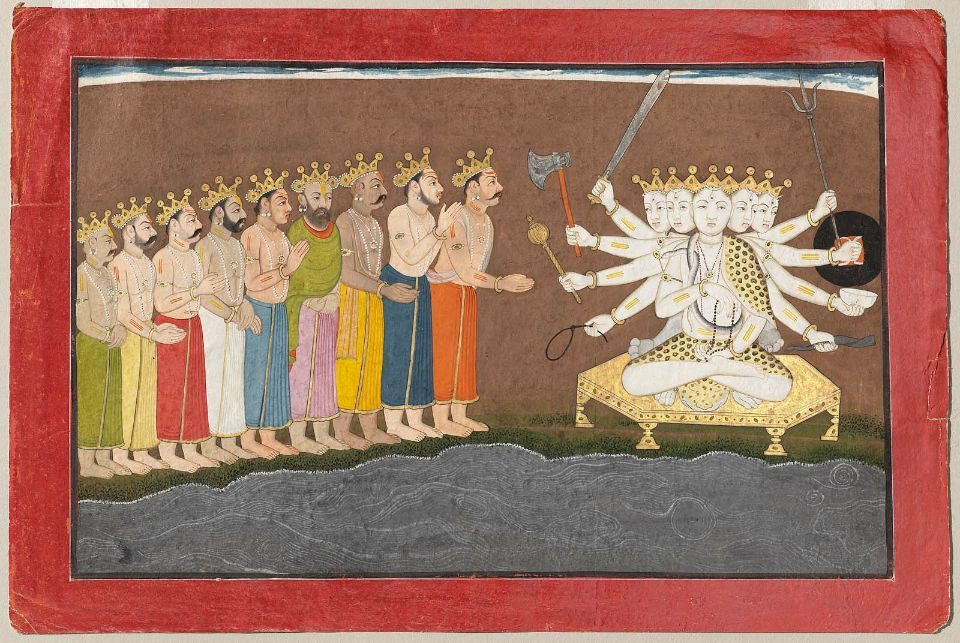
The ten Prachetas paying homage to Shiva, from a Bhagavata Purana series

Prachetas (Sanskrit: प्रचेतस्) lit. '"the prescient one"' is a term in Hindu mythology with a number of definitions:

- It is the designation for a group of beings in the Vedas.
- It is a name of one of the ten Prajapatis, the son of Suvarna and Suvarni, a law giver and sage.
- It is an epithet of water god Varuna. The grandson of the sage Marichi and Kala, who is their grandson through their son Kashyapa and his wife Aditi.
- It is the collective term for the ten great-grandsons of Prithu and Archi.

== Vedas ==
Prachetas are those which bring consciousness to the outside, through the development of the senses that are active as sensations. These senses are the five forces of mind, five different angles of reflection; their formation took place with the help of the Prachetas.

In the Rigveda mantra I.41.1, which reads:

यं रक्षन्ति प्रचेतसो वरुणो मित्रो अर्यमा |
नू चित्स दभ्यते जनः ||

The word, prachetas, refers to men of knowledge, the men who are learned and wise. But in the Rigveda mantra I.5.7, which reads:

आ त्वा विशन्त्वाशवः सोमास इन्द्र गिर्वणः |
शं ते सन्तु प्रचेतसे ||

(गिर्वणः इन्द्र) Praise-worthy Lord ! (आशवः सोमासः आ विशन्तु त्वा) Impatient seekers may enter Thee. May they (सन्तु शं) be gratifying (ते) to Thee, (प्र-चेतसे) the super-conscious Being.

This refers to the "super-conscious" being in whom it is prayed that the "impatient seekers" be allowed to enter (i.e. be merged with).

== Puranas ==
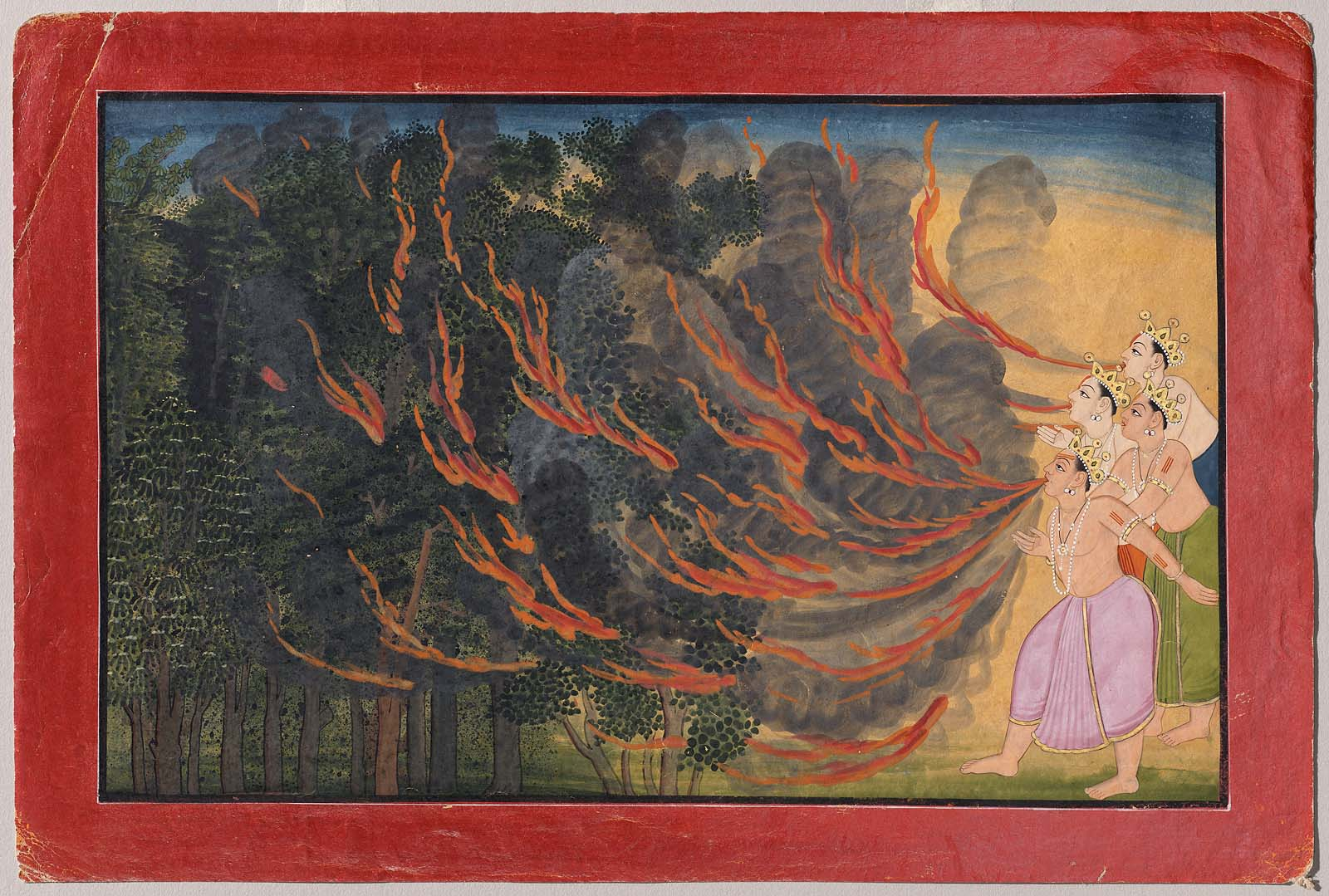
The ten Prachetases burn the forests

According to the Puranas, Prachetas was a descendant of Druhyu; he was the son of Duryaman who was the son of Dhrita, the great-great-great grandson of Druhyu. Pracetas had one hundred sons who were the kings of the Mlecchas, the barbarians of the northern Indian subcontinent. Prachetas is one of the Prajapatis, and an ancient sage and law-giver.

It is also said that there were ten Prachetas who were the sons of Prāchinabarhi and great grandsons of Prithu and Archi; according to the Vishnu Purana, they had passed ten thousand years in the great ocean, deep in meditation upon Vishnu who made them the progenitors of humanity.

As the story goes, the eldest of the ten sons of Prāchinabarhi, collectively known as Prachetas, became their ruler; they cleared forests and made the lands fit for agriculture; they married the daughters of Soma, who begot 49 sons called Daksha Prachetases. There were 49 kings up to Daksha Prachetas. The Prachetas emerged from the ocean after their long sojourn to find the Earth covered by trees; they created wind and fire and destroyed the trees. Brahma, however, requested that they not do so, and solemnized their marriage with Marisha; and it was their union that gave the second body to Daksha.

Prachetasa is considered to be one of the most mysterious figures of Hindu mythology. It is an epithet for Varuna the god of water and its principle and as such are related to Shatabhisha asterism. According to the Puranas Prachetasa was one of the 10 Prajapatis who were ancient sages and law gives. But there is also a reference to 10 Prachetas who were sons of Prachinabarthis and great grandsons of Prithu. It is said that they lived for 10,000 years in a great ocean, very deeply engaged in meditation upon Vishnu and obtained from him the boon of becoming the progenitors of mankind. They married a girl named Manisha, a daughter of Kanclu. Daksha was their son. But according to another version it is said that Prajapati Daksha an ancient sage and contemporary of Shiva, gave his 27 daughters in marriage to Soma (Chandra). Soma was the son of Atri and Anusūyā. But it is also said that Daksha was also the son of a woman called Marichi. Marichi is again referred to as the mother of Daksha. Thus it appears that Prachetasas were Daksha's fathers as well as Daksha's great-grandsons. This confusion arises in Hindu families essentially because children are often named after their grandfather or great grandfather.
