= Archi (Hindu goddess) =

Form of the Hindu goddess Lakshmi

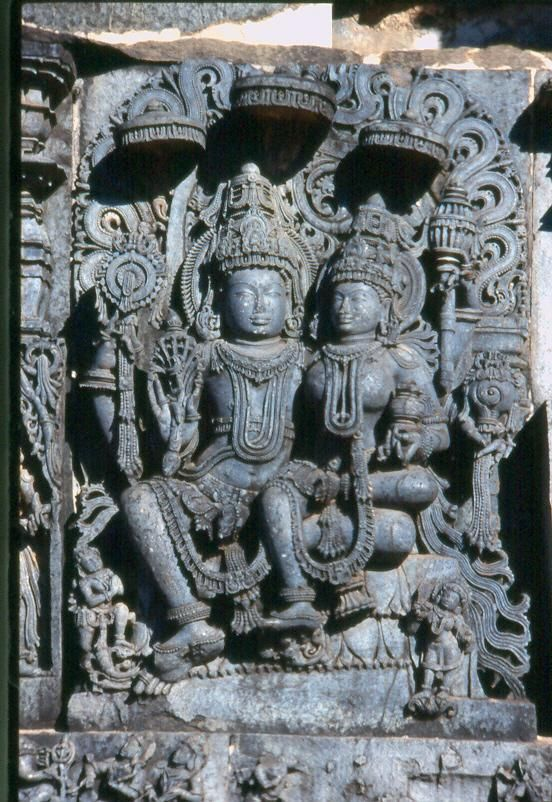
Vishnu with Lakshmi

Archi (Sanskrit: अर्ची, Arcī, lit. "adored") is a queen, and an earthly avatar of Lakshmi in Hindu mythology. According to the Bhagavata Purana, Archi emerges from Vena's body, along with her husband, King Prithu and each of them are an incarnation of Lakshmi and Vishnu, respectively.

As consort, she followed her husband into the forest for sannyasa. When he died, she dutifully self-immolates herself on his funeral pyre:

the Queen executed the necessary funerary functions and offered oblations of water. After bathing in the river, she offered obeisances to various demigods situated in the sky in the different planetary systems. She then circumambulated the fire and, while thinking of the lotus feet of her husband, entered its flames.

— Śrīmad-Bhāgavatam (Bhāgavata Purāṇa) (Canto 4, Chapter 23, verse 22)

== See also ==
- Prithu
- Lakshmi
