= Prithu =

Hindu mythological king

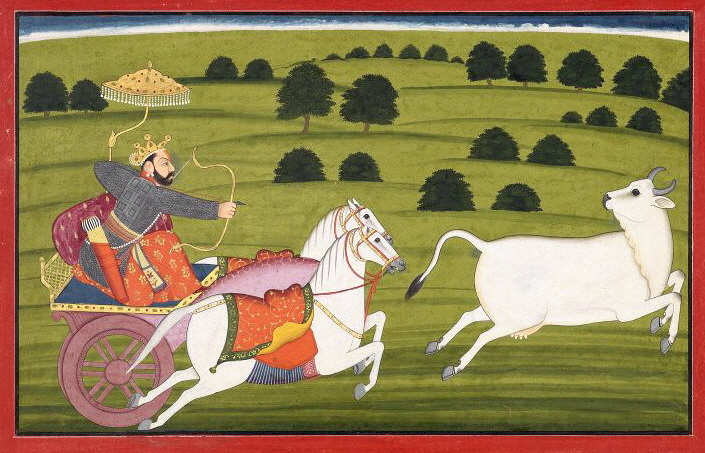
- Prithu chasing Prithvi, who is in the form of a cow
- Devanagari: पृथु
- Affiliation: Vaishnavism, Chakravarti sovereign
- Weapon: Bow and arrow

Genealogy
- Parents: Vena (father)
- Consort: Archi
- Children: Vijitsatva

Prithu (Sanskrit: पृथु, Pṛthu, lit. "large, great, important, abundant") is a sovereign (chakravarti), featured in the Puranas. According to Hinduism, he is an avatar (incarnation) of the preserver god—Vishnu. He is also called Prithu, Prithi and Prithvi Vainya, literally, "Prithu — the son of Vena".

Prithu is "celebrated as the first consecrated king, from whom the earth received her (Sanskrit) name, Prithvi." He is mainly associated with the legend of his chasing the earth goddess, Prithvi, who fled in the form of a cow and eventually agreed to yield her milk as the world's grain and vegetation. The epic Mahabharata, Vishnu Purana, and the Bhagavata Purana describe him as a part-avatar (incarnation) of Vishnu.

== Legends ==
Prithu was born without female intervention (without a womb), thus being a ayonija ("born without [the participation] of the yoni"), Prithu is untouched by desire and ego and can thus control his senses to rule with dharma.

The legend of Prithu is found in the epic Mahabharata and most Puranas; the Vishnu Purana, Bhagavata Purana and the Padma Purana are the most detailed.

The Vishnu Purana, the Matsya Purana, the Brahma Purana, the Bhagavata Purana and the Harivamsha state that King Vena was the son of King Anga, from the lineage of the pious Dhruva, though the scriptures differ in the number and names of the generations between Dhruva and Anga. The Padma Purana however states that Anga descends from the sage Atri.

The Vishnu Purana states that Vena's mother was Sunitha, the daughter of Mrityu. Vena was an evil king, who neglected Vedic rituals. Thus the rishis (sages) killed him, leaving the kingdom without an heir and in famine due to the anarchy of Vena. So to create a son, the sages rubbed Vena's thigh, out of which first appeared a dark dwarf hunter, a symbol of Vena's evil. The dwarf was known as Nishada, the originator of his namesake race. Since the sins of Vena had gone away as the dwarf, the body was now pure. On further churning, Prithu emerged from right arm of the corpse. The Bhagavata Purana adds that when the sage churned the arms of Prithu, a couple emerges: Prithu and Archi, who will be his wife.

The Vishnu Purana continues: Prithu had the sign of Vishnu's chakra (discus) on his right hand. The creator-god Brahma recognized Prithu as an avatar of Vishnu, owing to this. His power is said to superior to the gods. The text states the chakra is the sign of an universal emperor (chakravarti, lit. "in whom the chakra abides"). However according to Oldham, the title chakravarti may be derived from the birthmark, and may not be indicative of universal dominion. In the Bhagavata Purana specifics that the chakra mark is on Prithu's right palm and a lotus mark on the soles of his feet.

In the Vishnu Purana, a celestial bow called Ajagava and arrows etc. were gifted by the heavens to Prithu. The Bhagavata Purana describes several gifts like throne, ornaments, royal umbrella, crown, sceptre, sword, shield, bow and arrows, horses, cows and other royal signina as gifts from various deities.

The birth of Prithu is treated as a yajna (sacrifice) by Brahma. Prithu was crowned Raja. Sūtas and magadhas, royal heralds and bards, were produced from the sacrifice, and sang the king's glories. Implored by his subjects to end the famine by slaying the earth and getting her vegetation, Prithu chased the earth (Prithvi) who fled as a cow. Finally cornered by Prithu, the earth pleads Prithu to spare her life and in turn she will grant her vegetation. So Prithu lowered his weapons and reasoned with the earth and promised her to be her guardian. Before Prithu's reign, there was "no cultivation, no pasture, no agriculture, no highway for merchants", all civilization emerged in Prithu's rule. Prithu levelled the mountains and established villages, which were settled by his subjects. Prithu milked her using Swayambhuva Manu (the first man) as the calf, and received all vegetation and grain as her milk, in his hands for welfare of humanity. By granting life to the earth and being her protector, Prithu became the earth's father and she accepted the patronymic name "Prithvi".

Various beings emulate Prithu by milking the earth-cow with a distinct calf, using various vessels and acquires different gifts as milk from the earth. While the Vishnu Purana does not provide the details, the Matsya Purana states as follows:

Beings	Milker	Calf	Milk	Vessel
Rishis (sages)	Brihaspati	Chandra (Soma), the moon	Devotion	Vedas
Devas (gods)	Indra, the king of gods	Surya (Mitra), the Sun	"superhuman" Power	Gold
Pitris (ancestors)	Antaka (death)	Yama, the god of death	Svadha (the food or oblations offered to Pitrs)	silver
Nagas (serpent)	Takshaka, a snake	Dhritarashtra, a snake	poison	Gourd
Asuras (demons)	Virochana, the king of asuras	Dwimurdhan	Maya (illusion)	iron
Yakshas	Kubera, the king of yakshas		ability to disappear	unbaked
Rakshasas	Sumali	Raupyanabha	blood	
Gandharvas and Apsaras	Vasuruchi	Chitraratha	Perfumes	of lotus-leaves
Mountains	Meru (Sumeru)	Himavat (Himalaya)	herbs and jewels	crystal
Trees	Plaksha (white fig)	Sala (Shorea robusta)	Sap	Palash

The Bhagavata Purana, the Padma Purana and the Brahma Purana provide the list with some variation.

The Manu Smriti considers Prithvi as Prithu's wife and not his daughter, and thus suggests the name "Prithvi" is named after her husband, Prithu.

The Vayu Purana records that when born, Prithu stood with a bow, arrows and an armour, ready to destroy the earth, which was devoid of Vedic rituals. Terrified, the earth fled in form of a cow and finally submitted to Prithu's demands, earning him the title chakravartin (sovereign). Prithu is the first king, recorded to earn the title. The Shatapatha Brahmana (Verse 3.5.4.) calls him the first anointed king and Vayu Purana calls him Adiraja ("first king").

The epic Mahabharata states that Vishnu crowned Prithu as the sovereign and entered the latter's body so that everyone bows to the king as to the god Vishnu. Now, the king was "endowed with Vishnu's greatness on earth". Further, Dharma (righteousness), Shri (goddess of wealth, beauty and good fortune) and Artha (purpose, material prosperity) established themselves in Prithu.

The Atharvaveda credits Prithu of the invention of ploughing and thus, agriculture. He is also described as one who flattened the Earth's rocky surface, thus encouraging agriculture, cattle-breeding, commerce and development of new cities on earth. In a hymn in the Rigveda, Prithu is described as a rishi (seer). D. R. Patil suggests that the Rigvedic Prithu was a vegetarian deity, associated with Greek god Dionysus and another Vedic god Soma.

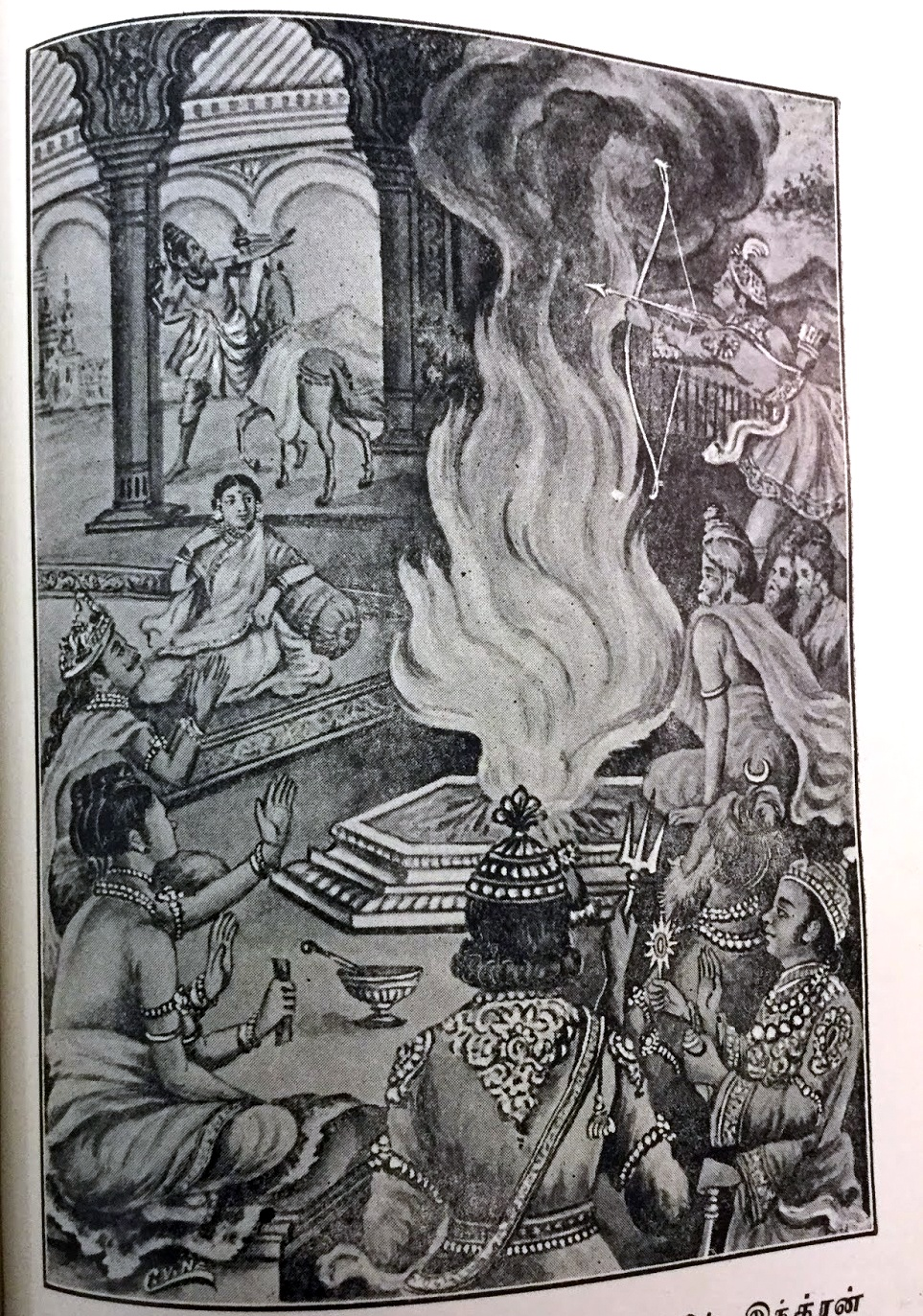
Indra seized the yajna Horse in the sacrifice conducted by Emperor Prithu

The Bhagavata Purana further states that Prithu performed ninety-nine ashvamedha yajnas (horse-sacrifices), but Indra, kings of the demi-gods, disturbed Prithu's hundredth one. The yajna was abandoned, Vishnu gave Prithu his blessings and Prithu forgave Indra for the latter's theft of the ritual-horse. It also states that the Four Kumaras, the four sage-avatars of Vishnu, preached Prithu about devotion to Vishnu. After governing his kingdom for a long time, Prithu left with his wife Archi, to perform penance in the forest in his last days. He experienced Samadhi and voluntarily gave up his body in the forest, and Archi went Sati on his funeral pyre.

=== Wives and children ===
The Vishnu Purana states that Prithu has two sons: Antardhi (Antardhana) and Palin (Pali). The family of Prithu continues through his eldest son Antardhi. Prithu's great grandsons were the Prachetas. The Vayu Purana, the Brahma Purana and the Harivamsa replicate the list of lineal descendants. However, the Bhagavata Purana disagrees. Apart from Prithvi who is sometimes considered the daughter or wife of Prithu, Prithu has a wife called Archi and five sons. Archi, emerged from Vena's body, along with Prithu and is considered as an avatar of the goddess Lakshmi, the wife of Vishnu. Prithu's son Vijitsva, became the sovereign and controlled the middle of the kingdom. Prithu's other sons, Haryarksha, Dhumrakesha, Vrika and Dravina ruled the east, south, west and north of the kingdom respectively.

== Symbolism ==
O'Flaherty interprets the myth of Prithu – his transformation from a hunter who chased the earth-cow to the herdsman-farmer as a transition in Vedic or Hindu people from eating beef to having cow's milk and cultivated vegetables and grain instead of beef. David Shulman compares Prithu with the Vedic deity Rudra-Shiva. Prithu, like Rudra, is an ideal king, but with a violent side. Prithu's actions of chasing the earth-cow as a hunter and finally milking her, display this terrifying side of the king. Both, Prithu and Rudra, are closely associated with sacrifice.

== Remembrance ==
Chinese scholar Hiuen Tsang (c. 640 AD) records the existence of the town Pehowa, named after Prithu, "who is said to be the first person that obtained the title Raja (king)". Another place associated with Prithu is Prithudaka (lit. "Prithu's pool"), a town on the banks of Sarasvati river, where Prithu is believed to have performed the Shraddha of his father. The town is referred to as the boundary between Northern and central India and referred to by Patanjali as the modern Pehowa.

Shriman Narayan, one of the protagonists of Indian Panchayati Raj movement, tracing its origin, writes: "It is believed that the system was first introduced by King Prithu while colonizing the Doab between the Ganga and Jamuna."
