= Vena (Hindu king) =

King in Hinduism

Information
- Family: Anga (father); Sunitha (mother)
- Children: Prithu and Nisada (born from his body after churning)

Vena (Sanskrit: वेन, romanized: Vena, lit. 'tormentor') is a king in Hinduism, notorious for his wickedness and misrule. A descendant of the first Manu, he bans all worship, offerings, and sacrifices upon his accession. After denying all petitions to restore these practices, Vena is slain by sages with their consecrated blades of grass. He is succeeded by the legendary king Prithu, who springs from his right arm.

In the Rigveda (10.123), Vena is a personification of a celestial being, perhaps the rainbow. The name of the hymn is also Vena, as is the name of the author of RV 9.85.

In the Dwapara Yuga, Vena reincarnated as Paundraka Vasudeva. Paundraka Vāsudēva was a king appearing in Mahabharata and Bhagavata Purana. According to it, he was the king of Pundra Kingdom. he was an ally of both Jarasandha, the king of Magadha and Shakuni, the king of the Gandhara Kingdom. He was a major enemy of Shri Krishna whom he famously impersonated, claiming to be the true Vasudeva.

== Genealogy ==
The Bhāgavata Purāṇa traces the origin of Vena as a descendant of Dhruva and Cākṣuṣa Manu.

Dhruva's eldest son, Utkala, did not ascend the throne. So, Dhruva's second son, Vatsara, was made the king. Vatsara married Svarvīthi, who gave birth to Puṣpārṇa, Tigmaketu, Iṣa, Ūrja, Vasu, and Jaya.

Puṣpārṇa married Prabhā and Doṣā. Doṣā gave birth to Pradoṣa, Niśitha and Vyuṣṭha. Vyuṣṭha married Puṣkariṇī, and gave birth to Sarvatejas, who had a son – Cākṣuṣa Manu, from his wife Ākūti. Manu and his wife Nadvalā had twelve sons. Ulkmuka, one of Manu's sons, and his wife Puṣkariṇī (who had the same name as the wife of Vyuṣṭha) had six sons. Anga, one of Ulmuka's sons, married Sunīthā, who gave birth to Vena.

The Padma Purāṇa mentions that Sunīthā is the ugly daughter of Mṛtyu (death), and hence Vena is regarded to have been wicked from birth.

== Legend ==
=== Origin ===
The Padma Purana states that Sunitha, Vena's mother, was a cruel woman, who enjoyed hurting other people. Once, when she went to the forest to play with her maids, she saw a gandharva named Suśaṅkha. The handsome youth was engaged in a penance to propitiate the goddess of music, Saraswati. Sunitha started to annoy him, but Suśaṅkha resisted her attempts to distract him. Bitter that the youth was ignoring her, she struck him. Suśaṅkha was angered, but did not wish to strike a woman. Sunitha boasted of her lineage from Yama to him, but he was unimpressed. When Sunitha met Suśaṅkha again, she struck him with a whip. Furious, and shivering in pain, the youth cursed her thus:

You wicked girl! When you become a house-holder and join your husband you will get a son who will be a scoffer of Devas and Brahmins and an all-round sinner.

— Padma Purana

=== Birth ===
According to the Bhagavata Purana, once, when King Anga was performing the ashvamedha sacrifice, the deities did not accept his oblations, for he did not have a son. On the advice of sages, Anga performed another sacrifice and venerated Vishnu. From the sacrificial fire arose a person with milk-boiled rice (payasam). Anga fed the rice to his wife, Sunitha, who gave birth to a son. The son, from his childhood, was attached to his maternal grandfather Mrityu (a portion of Adharma), and turned to unrighteousness. He acted like a beast, ruthlessly hunting innocent deer. Seeing his wicked acts, he was named Vena, 'the tormentor'. Unable to disciple his child, Anga lost his peace of mind, and left his kingdom in disgust, retiring to the forest. Fearing anarchy and thieves, the sages and the people crowned Vena as the king, even though they were dissatisfied with the prince.

=== Reign and death ===
When Vena became the king, the thieves immediately stopped their crimes and hid themselves. However, Vena proclaimed that in his kingdom, no one would perform a sacrifice, and that they would not spend a single coin on religious acts. He banned religion. The sages visited Vena's court to conciliate the king, offering him wisdom about dharma (duty), moksha (salvation), and his responsibility as a ruler from the Dharmashastras. They asked him to restore the practice of sacrificial offerings and religious ceremonies. Vena declared their devotion towards Yajneshvara to be foolish, for he himself was the embodiment of all the deities. He commanded that all of his subjects worship him rather than any other being. Angered by the insult that the king had made towards their Brahmin birth, and the deity Vishnu, the sages slew him with consecrated blades of grass, while uttering the huṃ sound. A grieving Sunitha preserved her son's corpse by chanting mantras and applying medicines.

=== Birth of Prithu ===
After the death of Vena, there was anarchy, since Vena had no sons and heirs. Thieves and evil men begun to plunder and steal from innocent people. Wishing to continue the line of Vena's father, Anga, they kneaded the thigh of Vena, from which a dwarfish man appeared, with black features and blood-red eyes. The man bowed before the sages and asked them of his purpose. The sages told him to sit (niṣīda), after which he named himself. The man is said to have accepted all the sins committed by Vena unto himself. Thereafter, the descendants of the man came to be known as the Nishadas, dwelling in the Vindhya mountains.

The sages then began to knead the corpse’s right hand, from which a shining man, Prithu, bearing a divine bow, arrows, and armour appeared. The sages observed that Prithu had the mark of the Sudarshana Chakra, after which they identified him as a form of Vishnu. He was crowned as the new king, and went on to become a powerful ruler, restoring religious rites and sacrifices.

The people sought out Prithu, informing him that during the anarchy before his accession, the world had become so gloomy and dark that the earth-goddess, and incarnation of Lakshmi, Bhumi, had decided that she would not provide crops to humans anymore. She had taken the form of a cow and gone into hiding, making the earth empty of any vegetation. Furious, Prithu chased Bhumi through the three worlds, bearing his bow, Ajagava. When he finally cornered her, she pleaded with him to spare her. She allowed him and the sages to milk her, which restored the vegetation and vitality of the earth, as well as its people. Hence, Vishnu was able to make his consort restore her prosperity to the human race, as Prithu. Due to this reason, Bhumi acquired the epithet Prithvi.
