= Bhagavata Purana =

Sanskrit Hindu text

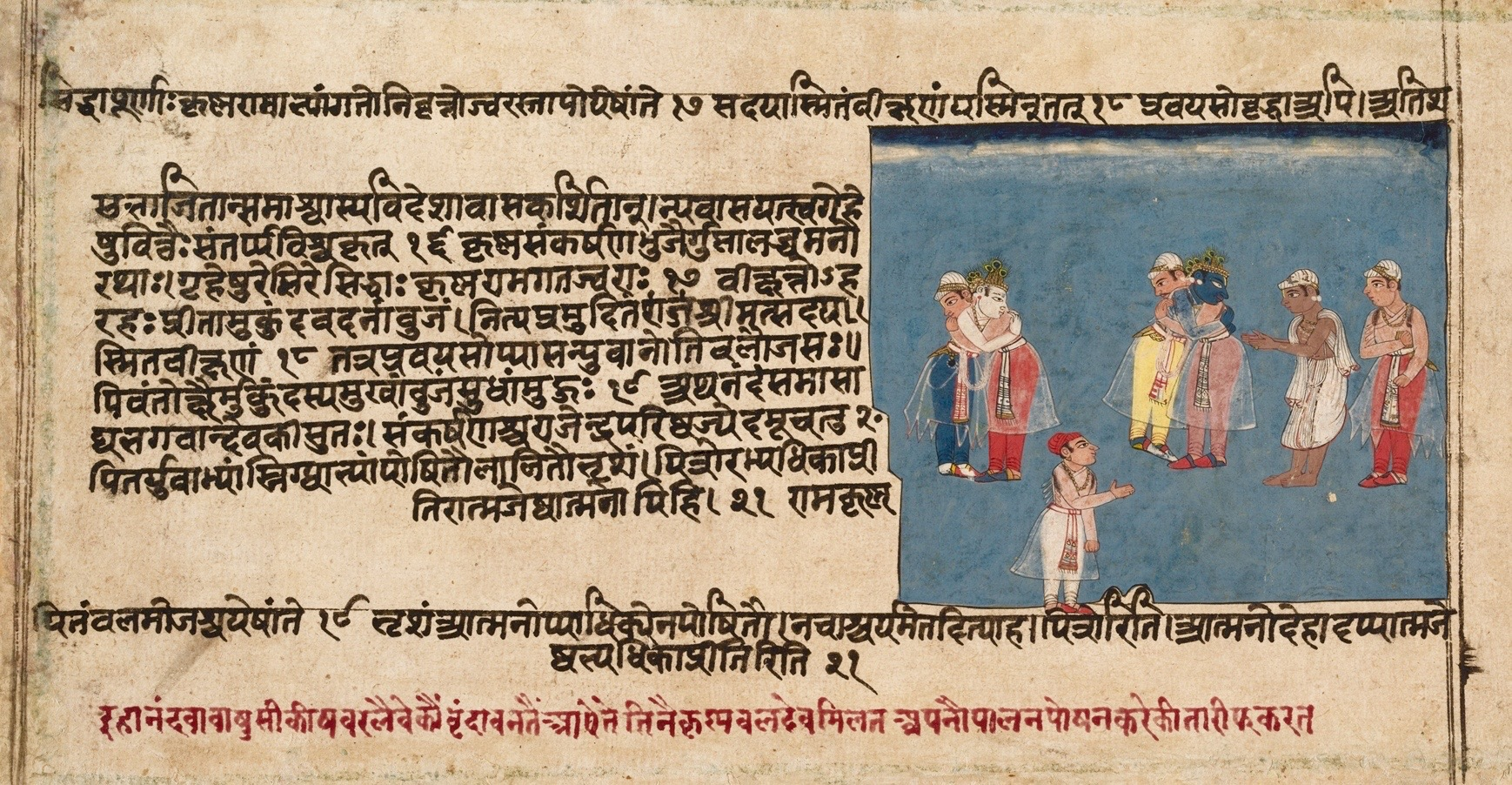
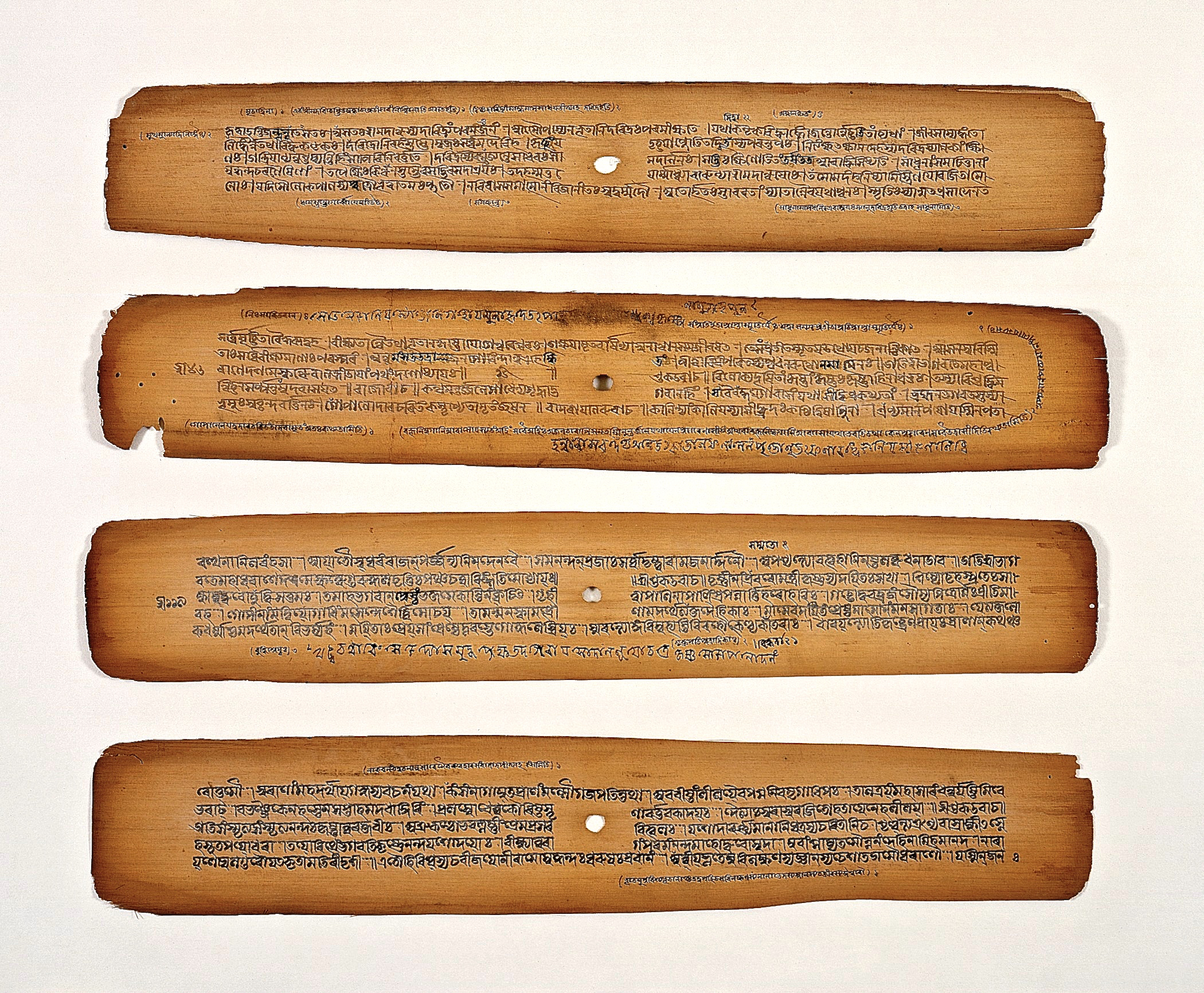
Bhagavata Purana manuscripts from 16th to 19th century, in Sanskrit (above) and in Assamese or Bengali

The Bhagavata Purana (Sanskrit: भागवतपुराण; IAST: Bhāgavata Purāṇa), also known as the Srimad Bhagavatam (Śrīmad Bhāgavatam), Srimad Bhagavata Mahapurana (Śrīmad Bhāgavata Mahāpurāṇa) or simply Bhagavata (Bhāgavata), is one of Hinduism's eighteen major popular Puranas (Mahapuranas) and central text in Vaishnavism. Composed in Sanskrit and traditionally attributed to Veda Vyasa, it promotes bhakti (devotion) towards Krishna. Like other Puranas, it discusses a wide range of topics including cosmology, astronomy, genealogy, geography, legend, music, dance, yoga and culture.

The text consists of twelve books (skandhas or cantos) totalling 335 chapters (adhyayas) and 18,000 verses. The tenth book, with about 4,000 verses, has been the most popular and widely studied. It is widely available in almost all Indian languages and was the first Purana to be translated into a European language, as a French translation of a Tamil version appeared in 1788 and introduced many Europeans to Hinduism and 18th-century Hindu culture during the colonial era.

The Bhagavata Purana propounds Vaishnava theology that is grounded in the philosophical traditions of Vedanta and Samkhya, utilizing these systems in the service of bhakti. The text articulates a theistic non-dualism (advaya-jñāna), defining ultimate reality in verse 1.2.11 through three ontological aspects: Brahman, Paramātman, and Bhagavān. Because it unifies devotion () with Vedāntic metaphysics, diverse traditions of Vedānta—including the Advaita (monism) of Adi Shankara, the Viśiṣṭādvaita (qualified monism) of Rāmānujachārya, The Dvaita (dualism) of Madhavacharya, and the Bhedābheda of Vallabha and Caitanya—have interpreted its verses through distinct commentaries.

== Nomenclature ==
- 'Bhagavata' (or 'Bhagavatam' or 'Bhagavat', Sanskrit भागवत) means 'follower or worshipper of Vishnu'.
  - 'Bhagavan' (Sanskrit भगवन्) means 'Blessed One', 'God', or 'Lord'. Krishna – the transcendental, primeval Personality of Godhead, avatar of Vishnu – is directly referred to as 'Bhagavan' throughout this scripture. It is stated in canto 1, chapter 3, verse 28, "kṛṣṇas tu bhagavān svayam" which A. C. Bhaktivedanta Swami Prabhupada translates as, "Lord Śrī Kṛṣṇa is the original Personality of Godhead."
- 'Purana' (Sanskrit पुराण) means 'ancient' or 'old' (or 'old traditional history'). It also means 'complete' and 'completing' in the sense that a Purana 'completes the Vedas'.
- 'Srimad' (or 'Srimat', Sanskrit श्रीमत्) means 'radiant', 'holy', 'splendid', or 'glorious', and is an honorific religious title.
  - 'Sri' (or 'Shri' or 'Shree', Sanskrit श्री) means 'wealth'. Lakshmi – Goddess of Wealth and Vishnu/Krishna's wife – is also referred to as 'Sri'.
  - 'Mad' (or 'Mat', Sanskrit मत्) means 'religion' or 'believed'.

== Modern scholarship ==
=== Dating and origin ===
Many Indologists do not give a precise date for Puranas because the information was passed orally since ancient times. Any assigned date only applies to the complete text as we have it now, not to the material within it.

In his 1986 study, Sheridan dates its composition to between 500 CE to 1000 CE. He argues that version of the text must have existed by 1030 CE, when it is mentioned by al Biruni. Within this range, many scholars including Hardy, date its final redaction to the 9th or early 10th century.

However, many scholars argue for an earlier composition, placing much of the text in the Gupta period (4th–7th centuries CE). Dennis Hudson's study of the 8th-century Vaikunta Perumal Temple at Kanchipuram provides iconographic evidence that the temple's sculptural panels and layout parallel the Bhagavata Purana, suggesting the text's narratives were already well-established by that era. Gupta and Valpey (2013) affirm this interpretation, concluding that Hudson's findings "convincingly suggest" an early, Gupta-period provenance for substantial portions of the Purana, while noting that arguments for a specifically South-Indian origin remain inconclusive. Bryant summarizes modern scholarship, stating that the Bhagavata Purana "might well have reached its final form by the Gupta period". This earlier dating is supported by its use of Vedic archaisms throughout the text, as well as dynastic lists that conclude before the Gupta era. Bryant also suggests that the text was likely composed in North India because northern references and "historical Puranic stories" are more numerous than southern ones.

In contrast, Sheridan argues that the Bhagavata Purana was written by a group of learned Brahmin ascetics, probably in South India, who were well versed in Vedic and ancient Indian literature and influenced by the Alvars. The Bhagavata Purana contains apparent references to the South Indian Alvar saints and it makes a post factum prophecy of the spread of Vishnu worship in Tamil country (BP XI.5.38–40); these facts, along with its emphasis on "emotional Bhakti to Krishna" and the "Advaita philosophy of Sankara", lead many scholars to trace its origins to South India. However, J. A. B. van Buitenen points out that 10th–11th CE South Indian Vaishnava theologians Yamuna and Ramanuja do not refer to Bhagavata Purana in their writings, and this anomaly must be explained before the geographical origins and dating are regarded as definitive.

== Content and structure ==
The Bhagavata Purana consists of twelve skhandas or cantos consisting of 18,000 verses of several interconnected, interwoven, and non-linear dialogues, teachings, and explanations. The layered dialogues occur simultaneously, which strengthens the message. The main reciter is Suka, addressing King Pariksit. Suka quotes an earlier speaker, Narada, addressing King Yudhisthira, Pariksit's granduncle. The text notes that the first speaker was its composer, Vyasa. Suka is Vyasa's son, who is seen to faithfully repeat the text. The Bhagavata emphasizes that even knowledge from texts should be received from a teacher who has embodied the teachings.

=== Stated authorship and purpose ===
From the N. P. Jain for Motilal Banarsidass translation:

The divine seer, Vedavyasa, composed this Purana, known by the name of Srimad Bhagavata, which stands on a par with the Vedas and contains the stories of the Lord of excellent renown.

— Śrīmad Bhāgavatam 1st Canto, Chapter 3, Verse 40

In his A History of Indian Literature, Sisir Kumar Das writes that the Bhagavata's main aim is to promote bhakti toward Krishna and has a special emphasis on an intense personal and passionate bhakti without ulterior motivations.

The text aims to show Krishna as supreme and Vishnu to be a part of him.

=== Puranic characteristics ===
As detailed in the Matsya Mahapurana, all Puranas must cover at least five specific subjects or topics referred to in Sanskrit as Pancha Lakshana (literally meaning 'consisting of five characteristics') – in addition to other information including specific deities and the four aims or goals of life. From the K. L. Joshi (editor) translation:

The following are the five characteristics of the Puranas: They describe (1) the creation of the universe, (2) its genealogy and dissolution, (3) the dynasties, (4) the Manvantaras, (5) the dynastic chronicles. The Puranas, with these five characteristics, sing the glory of Brahma, Vishnu, the Sun and Rudra, as well as they describe also the creation and dissolution of the Earth. The four [aims of human life] (Dharma, Artha, Kama and Moksa) have also been described in all the Puranas, along with evil consequences following from sin. In the sattvika Puranas there is largely a mention of Hari's glory.

— Matsya Mahapurana, Chapter 53

Srimad Bhagavatam covers ten characteristics, while lesser Puranas cover five characteristics. SB 2.10.1 lists the ten characteristics as: "the creation of the universe, subcreation, planetary systems, protection by the Lord, the creative impetus, the change of Manus, the science of God, returning home (back to Godhead), liberation and the summum bonum". Jiva Goswami explains that the ten characteristics in the Srimad Bhagavatam are spread across all twelve cantos. Each canto discusses different aspects of these topics with varying emphasis, covering all key aspects of human knowledge without following a strict order.

=== Manuscripts ===
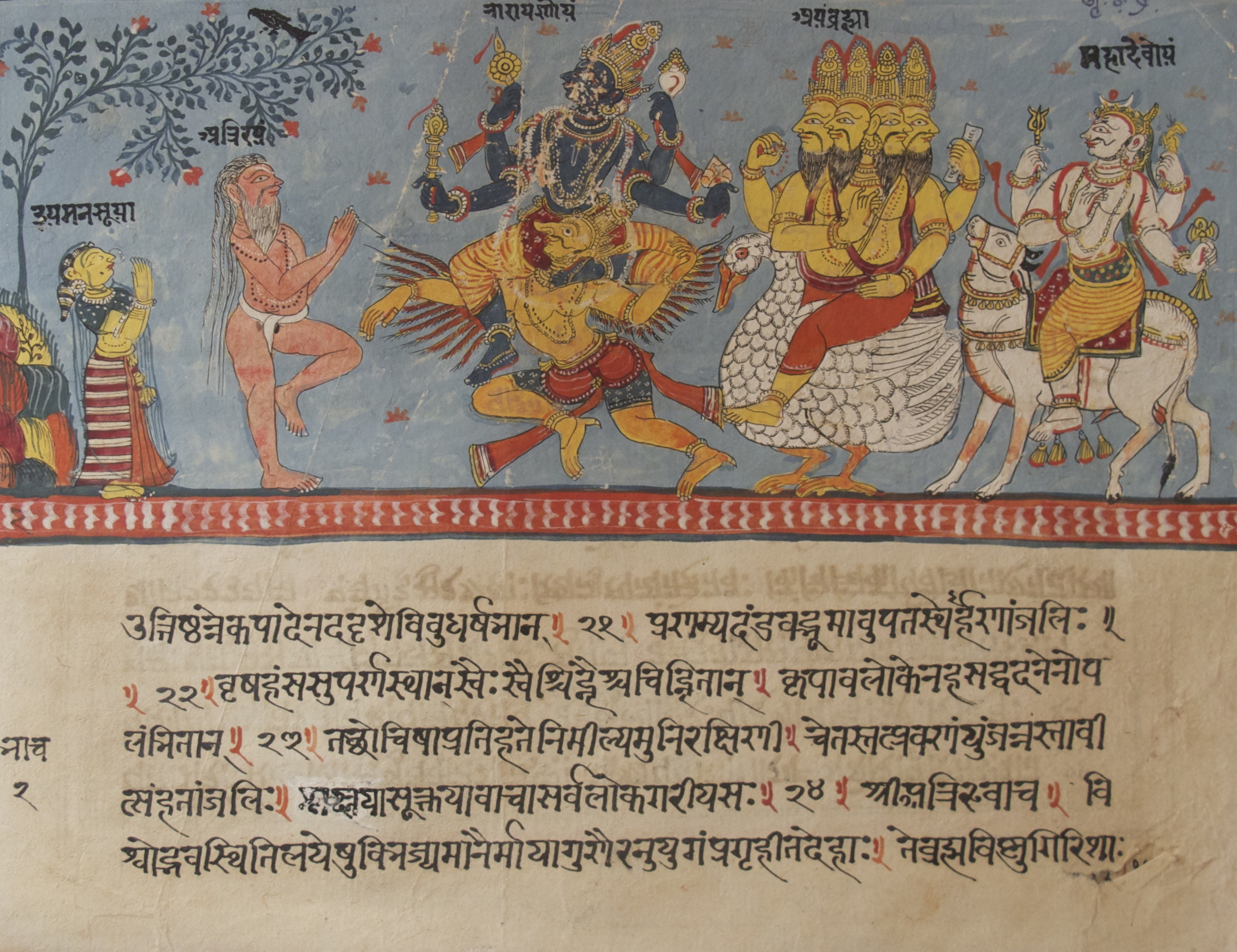
A Bhagavata Purana manuscript

According to Hariprasad Gangashankar Shastri, the oldest surviving manuscript dates to c. 1124-25 and is held in the Sampurnananda Sanskrit Vishvavidyalaya in Varanasi.

Poetic or artistic license with existing materials is a strong tradition in Indian culture, a 'tradition of several hundred years of linguistic creativity'. The common manuscript for translations of the Bhagavata Purana – seemingly used by both Swami Prabhupada and Bibek Debroy – is the Bhāgavatamahāpurāṇam a reprint of Khemraj Shri Krishnadas' manuscript. In regard to variances in Puranic manuscripts, Gregory Bailey states:

[S]ignificant are the widespread variations between manuscripts of the same Purana, especially those originating in different regions of India... one of the principal characteristics of the genre is the status of Purana as what Doniger calls "fluid texts" (Doniger 1991, 31). The mixture of fixed form [the Puranic Characteristics] and seemingly endless variety of content has enabled the Purana to be communicative vehicles for a range of cultural positions ... [the] idea of originality is primarily Western and belies the fact that in the kind of oral genres of which the Puranas continue to form a part, such originality is neither promoted nor recognised. Like most forms of cultural creation in India, the function of the Puranas was to reprocess and comment upon old knowledge ...

— The Study of Hinduism (Arvind Sharma, editor), Chapter 6 ('The Puranas: A Study in the Development of Hinduism')

== Cantos (skandhas) ==
SB 1.1.3 original Sanskrit:

निगमकल्पतरोर्गलितं फलं
शुकमुखादमृतद्रवसंयुतम् ।
पिबत भागवतं रसमालयं
मुहुरहो रसिका भुवि भावुका: ॥ ३ ॥

O ye devotees possessing a taste for divine joy, Srimad Bhagavata is the fruit (essence) of the wish-yielding tree of Veda, dropped on earth from the mouth of the parrot-like sage Suka, and is full of the nectar of supreme bliss. It is unmixed sweetness (devoid of rind, seed or other superfluous matter). Go on drinking this divine nectar again and again till there is consciousness left in you.

=== First Canto ===
Consisting of 19 chapters, the first canto opens with an invocation to Krishna and the assertion that the Srimad Bhagatavam, compiled by Veda Vyasa, is sufficient alone to realise God. The overarching narration begins at the onset of Kali Yuga as a dialogue between Sukadeva Gosvami (the son of Veda Vyas) and a group of sages headed by Saunaka, as they perform a thousand-year sacrifice for Krishna and his devotees in the forest of Naimisaranya. Questioned by the sages, topics covered by Suka Gosvami include the:

- Birth of Pariksit – protected in the womb by Krishna – in the aftermath of the devastating Kurukshetra War
- Appearance and instruction of Narada to Veda Vyasa on the composition of the Srimad Bhagavatam
- Meditation and inspiration of Veda Vyasa on the western bank of the Sarasvati river to compile and revise the Bhagavata
- Teaching of the Bhagavata by Veda Vyasa to his already-liberated son, Suka Gosvami
- Departure and disappearance of Krishna, followed by the signs and onset of Kali Yuga
- Retirement of the Pandavas (including King Yudhisthira) and consequent enthronement of Pariksit
- Attempts of Pariksit to stem the influence of Kali before being cursed by a Brahmana boy to die within seven days
- Renunciation of Pariksit, who decided to fast until death (Prayopavesa) on the banks of the Ganges in devotion to Krishna
- Arrival of sages (including Narada and Bhrgu) and their disciples to Pariksit's fast, followed by Suta Gosvami

The first canto introduces the primary narrative underlying the entire text. King Pariksit encounters a sage in the forest, but disrespects him. Consequently, the sage's son curses Parikshit to die from a snakebite in seven days.

SB 1.3.38 original Sanskrit:

स वेद धातु: पदवीं परस्य
दुरन्तवीर्यस्य रथाङ्गपाणे: ।
योऽमायया सन्ततयानुवृत्त्या
भजेत तत्पादसरोजगन्धम् ॥ ३८ ॥

The power of the Lord who wields the discus in His hand is infinite; though the Maker of this world, He remains ever beyond it. He alone can know His ways who inhales the fragrance of His lotus-feet through constant and sincere devotion to them.

=== Second Canto ===
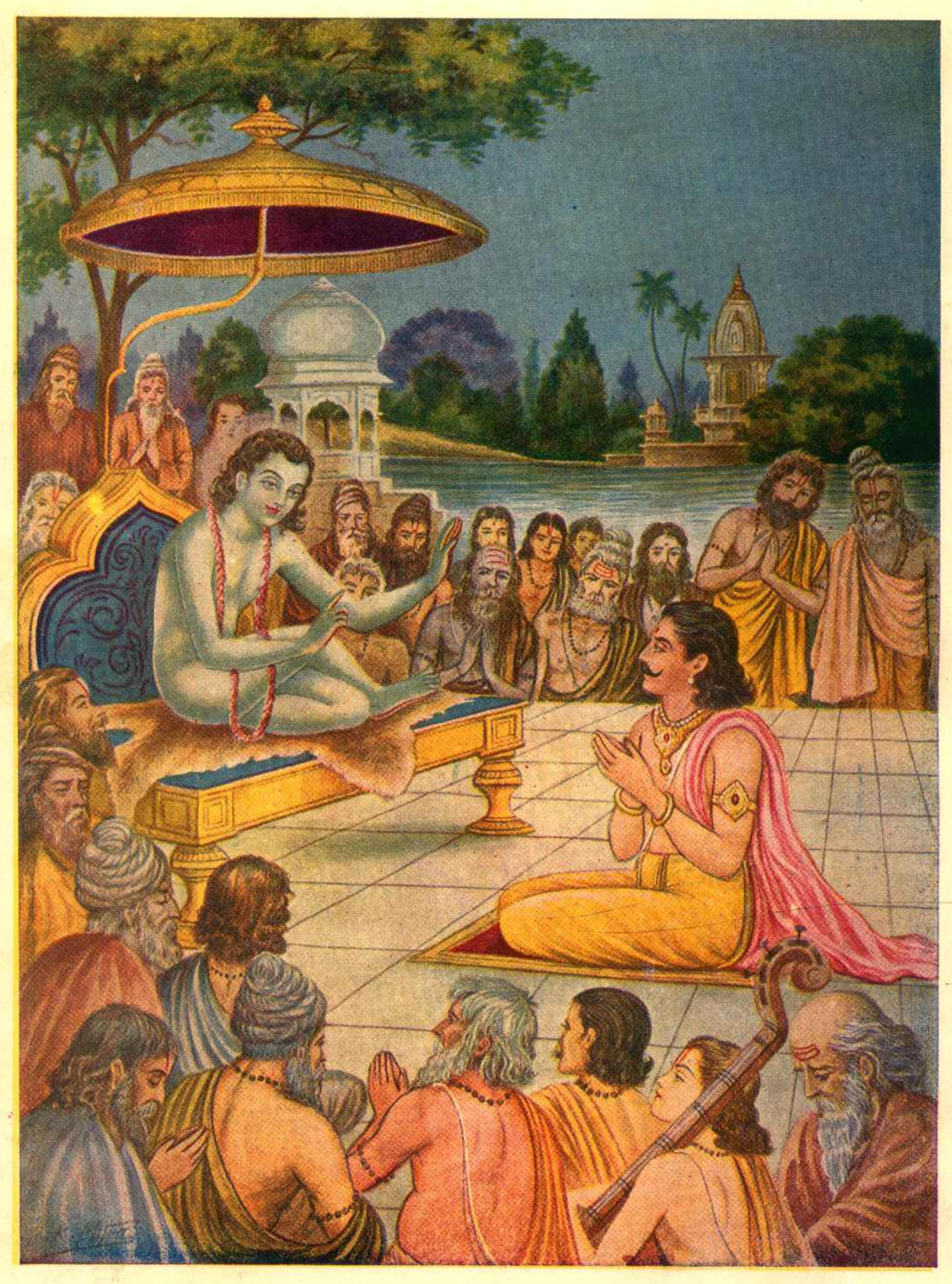
Sukadeva Gosvami addressing Pariksit

Consisting of 10 chapters, the second canto opens with an invocation to Krishna. The second layer of overarching narration begins as a dialogue between Sukadeva Gosvami and Pariksit on the banks of the Ganges river (narrated by Suta Gosvami to a group of sages headed by Saunaka in the forest of Naimisaranya). Suka discusses the way to meditate by focusing on God's cosmic body and the subtle form of God within one's heart. He answers questions about creation and describes how God descends into the world.

SB 2.5.35 original Sanskrit:

स एव पुरुषस्तस्मादण्डं निर्भिद्य निर्गत: ।
सहस्रोर्वङ्‌घ्रिबाह्वक्ष: सहस्राननशीर्षवान् ॥ ३५ ॥

Bursting open that (Cosmic) egg, issued therefrom the same Supreme Person (the Cosmic Being) with thousands of thighs, feet, arms and eyes and thousands of faces and heads too.

=== Third Canto ===
Consisting of 33 chapters, the third canto continues the dialogue between Sukadeva Gosvami and Pariksit on the banks of the Ganges river. Vidura, the sudra incarnation of Yama and devotee of Krishna, is the main protagonist narrated. After being thrown out of his home by King Dhritarashtra (his older half-brother) for admonishing the Kaurava's ignoble behaviour towards the Pandavas, Vidura went on a pilgrimage where he met other devotees of Krishna such as Uddhava and the sage Maitreya; their dialogues form a third layer of narration. Topics covered by Sukadeva Gosvami, Uddhava, and Maitreya include the:

- Remembrance, pastimes, qualities, and kingdom (Vaikuntha) of Vishnu
- Universal – Virat-Rupa – form of Vishnu to animate dormant material energy for creation (with Kali, explicitly stated to represent His external energy)
- Emergence of Brahma from Garbhodakasayi Vishnu; Brahma's prayers to Vishnu, creation of living beings, and manifestation of the Vedas
- Curse of the Four Kamaras on Jaya and Vijaya and their consequent incarnations as the demons Hiranyaksa and Hiranyakasipu
- Appearance of the Varaha avatar to lift the Earth out of the depths of the Cosmic Ocean (Garbhodakasayi) and destroy Hiranyaksa
- Appearance of the Kapila avatar to expound Sankya philosophy and devotional service (Bhakti Yoga) for Krishna. A dialogue between Kapila and his mother Devahuti explains the constituent parts of matter to help her overcome the suffering caused by identifying the self with the physical body.
- Ten phases of creation and cyclical divisions of time

SB 3.25.25 original Sanskrit:

सतां प्रसङ्गान्मम वीर्यसंविदो
भवन्ति हृत्कर्णरसायना: कथा: ।
तज्जोषणादाश्वपवर्गवर्त्मनि
श्रद्धा रतिर्भक्तिरनुक्रमिष्यति ॥ २५ ॥

Through the fellowship of saints one gets to hear My stories, leading to a correct and full knowledge of My glory and pleasing to the heart as well as to the ear. By hearing such stories one is sure to develop one after another reverence and fondness for and Devotion to the Lord, whose realization is preceded by the cessation of ignorance.

=== Fourth Canto ===
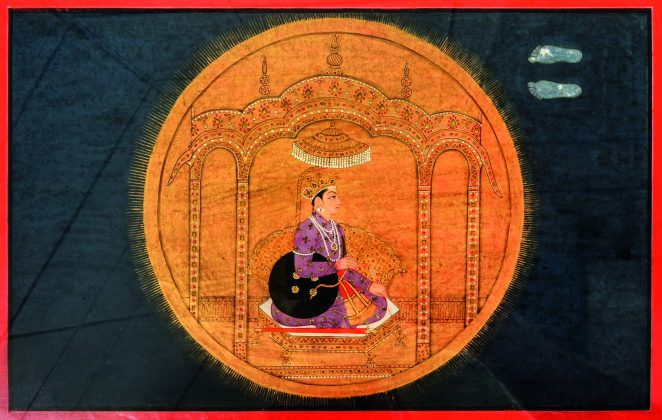
Dhruva as a star from Basholi Bhagavata Purana manuscript.

Consisting of 31 chapters, the fourth canto continues the dialogues of Sukadeva Gosvami, Uddhava, and Maitreya. There are additional layers of dialogue, such as between the sage-avatar Narada and King Pracinabharhisat (as narrated by Maitreya to Vidura). Focusing on the female descendants of Svayambhuva Manu, topics covered include the:

- Genealogies of the daughters of Svayambhuva Manu and of Dhruva (grandson of Svayambhuva Manu)
- Enmity between Daksa and Shiva, self-immolation of Sati (wife of Shiva and daughter of Daksa), and attack by Shiva on Daksa's ritual
- Tapasya and liberation of Dhruva, including advice from Narada, his vision of Vishnu, and battles between Dhruva and the Yaksas
- Killing of the tyrant-king Vena by Brahmins before the appearance of the king Prthu to restore abundance of the Earth
- Allegorical story, descriptions, and characteristics of King Puranjana, who was reborn as a woman due to thinking of his wife when he died
- Activities of the Pracetas, including meeting with Shiva, instruction from Narada, and ultimate liberation
- Qualities of Krishna, Vaishnava devotion (Bhakti Yoga), the soul (atman), the super-soul (paramatman), and materialistic life

SB 4.16.17 original Sanskrit:

मातृभक्ति: परस्त्रीषु पत्‍न्यामर्ध इवात्मन: । प्रजासु पितृवत्स्‍निग्ध: किङ्करो ब्रह्मवादिनाम् ॥ १७ ॥

He regards and reveres the wives of others as His mother and loves His own wife as a half of His own body. He is loving as a father to those over whom He rules; He looks upon Himself as a servant to those who are well-versed in the Vedic lore.

=== Fifth Canto ===
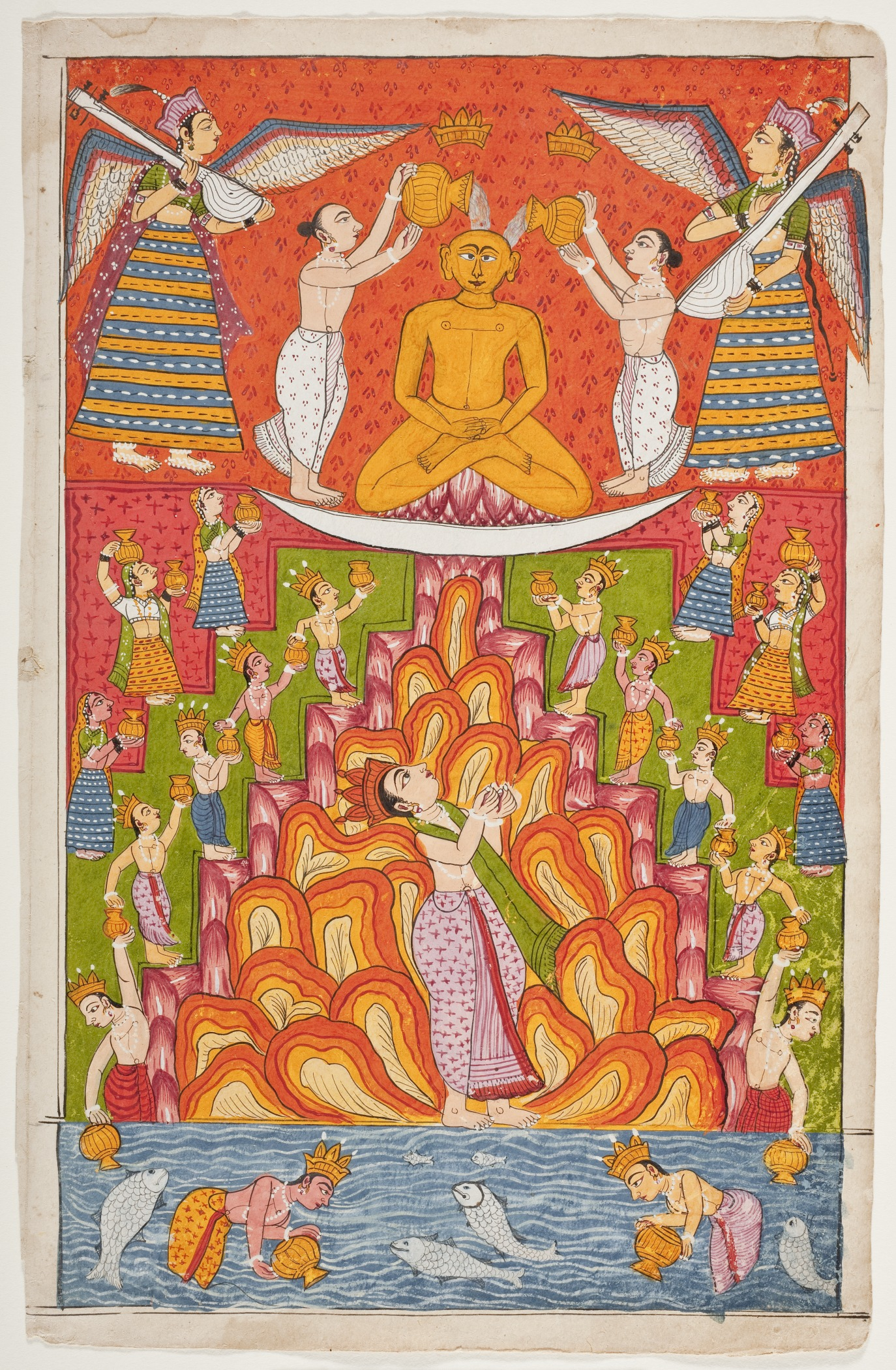
Rsabha.

Consisting of 26 chapters, the fifth canto focuses on the dialogue between Sukadeva Gosvami and Pariksit on the banks of the Ganges river. Notable additional layers of dialogue are between the avatar Rsabha and his sons, and between Bharata and King Rahugana (the former was perceived as a fool and made to carry the latter's palanquin). Topics covered include the:

- Appearance, life, and teachings of the publicly abused avatar Rsabha, the first Tirthankara (spiritual teacher) of Jainism
- Appearance of Hayagriva to return vedic knowledge to Brahma
- Activities, character, teachings, and liberation of King Bharata (incarnated as a deer and then a supposed idiot-Brahmin)
- Activities and descendants of King Priyavrata, whose chariot wheels created the seven oceans and islands (i.e. continents)
- Descriptions of the universe, sun, orbits of the planets, and the heavenly and hellish planets
- Flow of the Ganges and expansion of Narayana as Vasudeva (Krishna), Sankarsana, Pradyumna, and Aniruddha
- Glories of Ananta / Sankarsana / Shesha / Tamasi

SB 5.5.1 original Sanskrit:

ऋषभ उवाच
नायं देहो देहभाजां नृलोके
कष्टान् कामानर्हते विड्भुजां ये ।
तपो दिव्यं पुत्रका येन सत्त्वं
शुद्ध्येद्यस्माद् ब्रह्मसौख्यं त्वनन्तम् ॥ १ ॥

This (human) body in the mortal world does not deserve to be given up to (the pursuit of) sensuous pleasures, which are (really) a source of misery and which are enjoyed even by swine, dogs and other animals (that feed on ordure). It is worthy of being devoted, My beloved sons, to sublime austerities whereby the mind is purified; and from purity of mind follows the unending bliss of absorption into the Absolute.

=== Sixth Canto ===
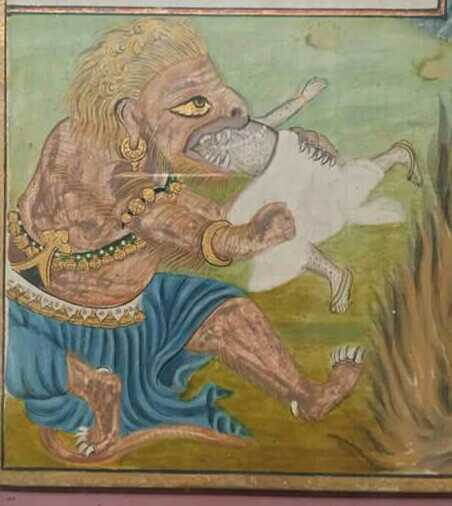
Vrtrasura attacks Indra

Consisting of 19 chapters, the sixth canto continues with the dialogue between Sukadeva Gosvami and Pariksit on the banks of the Ganges river. A notable additional layer of dialogue is between Yama and his messengers (called the Yamadutas). With the main focus on the battles of the demon-devotee Vrtrasura and his armies against the demigods led by Indra, as well as the life of King Citraketu, topics covered include the:

- Life of Ajamila, a Brahmin that lost liberation due to sex-attraction but was liberated due to calling his son – Narayana – upon death
- Instructions of Yamaraja to his messengers about justice, punishment, chanting, Vishnu's messengers, and surrender (Bhakti) to Krishna
- Curse of Daksa on Narada, and a genealogy of the daughters of Daksa
- Offence of Indra to Brhaspati, the appearance of Vrtrasura to battle the demigods, their prayers to Narayana and Vrtrasura's death
- Story of King Chitraketu, the murder of his son, instruction from Narada and Angiras, meeting with Krishna, and curse by Parvati
- Vow of Diti to kill Indra, her embryo being cut into 49 pieces by Indra but saved by Vishnu, and her purification through devotion
- Performance of the Pumsavana ceremony for pregnancy with prayers to Vishnu and Lakshmi (Goddess of Wealth and Fortune)

SB 6.3.13 original Sanskrit:

यो नामभिर्वाचि जनं निजायां
बध्नाति तन्‍त्र्यामिव दामभिर्गा: ।
यस्मै बलिं त इमे नामकर्म-
निबन्धबद्धाश्चकिता वहन्ति ॥ १३ ॥

Just as a farmer ties (his) oxen with tethers to a big cord (to keep them together), He binds men with (different) denominations (Brahmana, Ksatriya and so on) to His own Word (the Veda)-allots them different duties as enjoined by the Vedas; and, bound by (these) strong ties in the shape of class, names and obligations (attaching thereto), the aforesaid men meticulously bear offerings (do homage) to Him (through the scrupulous discharge of their duties).

=== Seventh Canto ===
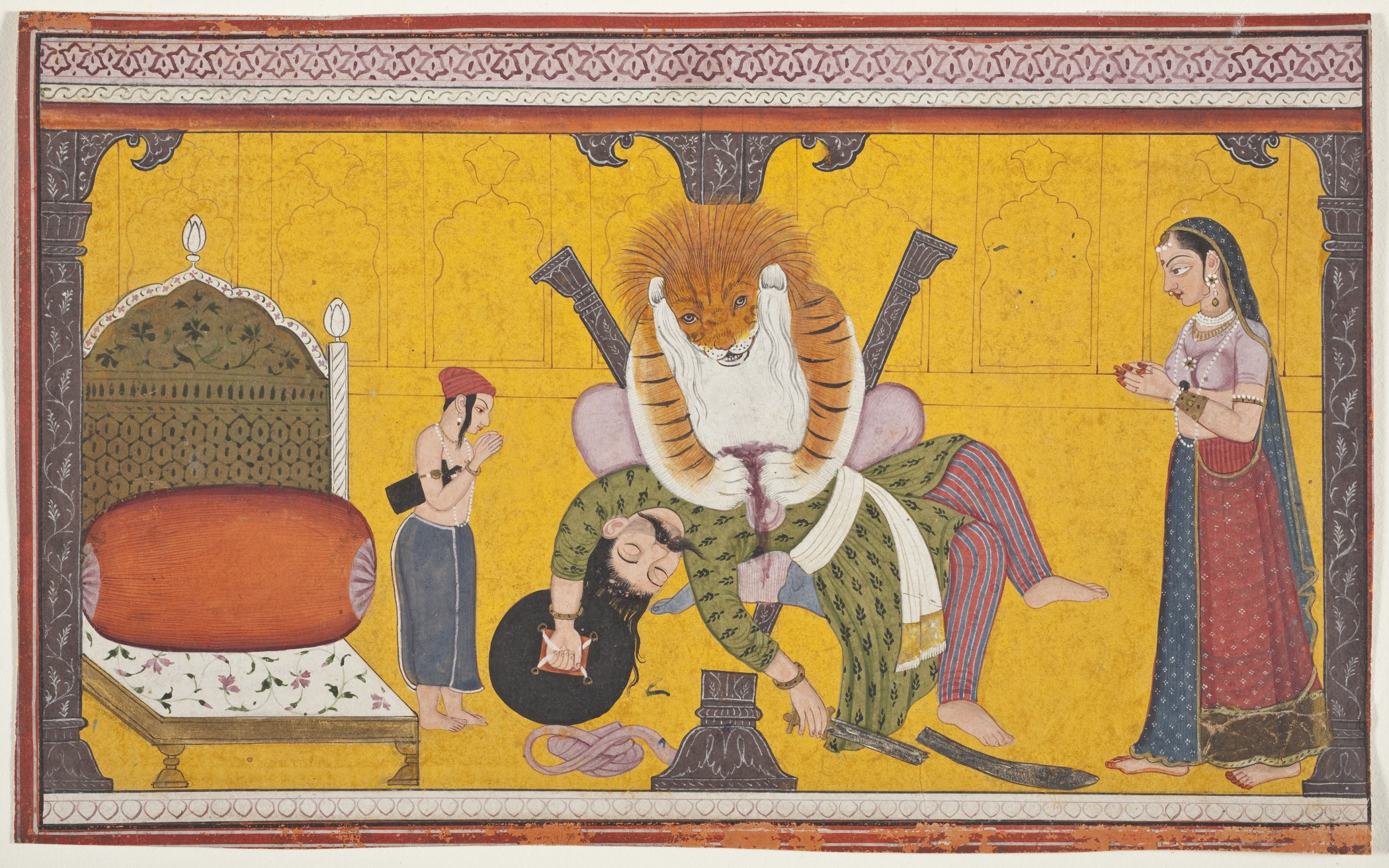
Nrsimha killing Hiranyakashipu with Prahlada on the left.

Consisting of 15 chapters, the seventh canto continues with the dialogue between Sukadeva Gosvami and Pariksit on the banks of the Ganges river. A notable additional layer of dialogue is between Narada and Yudhishthira about Prahlada, the devotee-son of the demon-King Hiranyakasipu (brother of Hiranyaksa, destroyed by the Varaha avatar in the third canto; the demonic brothers are incarnations of Jaya and Vijaya). Prahlada, protected by Vishnu, survives multiple attempts to kill him until the arrival of the Nrsimha avatar to destroy his father, who could not be killed by any weapon, by any man or beast, or in the water, air, or on land. Topics covered include the:

- Vow of demon-King Hiranyakasipu to destroy Vishnu, his austerities to become invincible, and conquering of the entire universe
- Birth, abuse, and teachings of the devotee Prahlada, son of Hiranyakasipu, protected from death by Vishnu
- Arrival of the Nrsimha avatar to destroy Hiranyakasipu, later pacified by the prayers of Prahlada
- Perfect society in the form of the four social and four spiritual classes or orders
- Behaviour of a good person, ideal family life, and instructions to be civilised
- Exposition that the absolute truth is a person – Vishnu – who is the master and controller of all universe.
- Previous incarnations of Narada, and that Krishna lived with the Pandavas like an ordinary human being

SB 7.14.9 original Sanskrit:

मृगोष्ट्रखरमर्काखुसरीसृप्खगमक्षिका: ।
आत्मन: पुत्रवत् पश्येत्तैरेषामन्तरं कियत् ॥ ९ ॥

He should look upon deer, camels, donkeys, monkeys, rats, reptiles, birds and flies as though they were their (own) children What is that which distinguishes these from those (children)? (They deserve his fostering care as much as his own children).

=== Eighth Canto ===
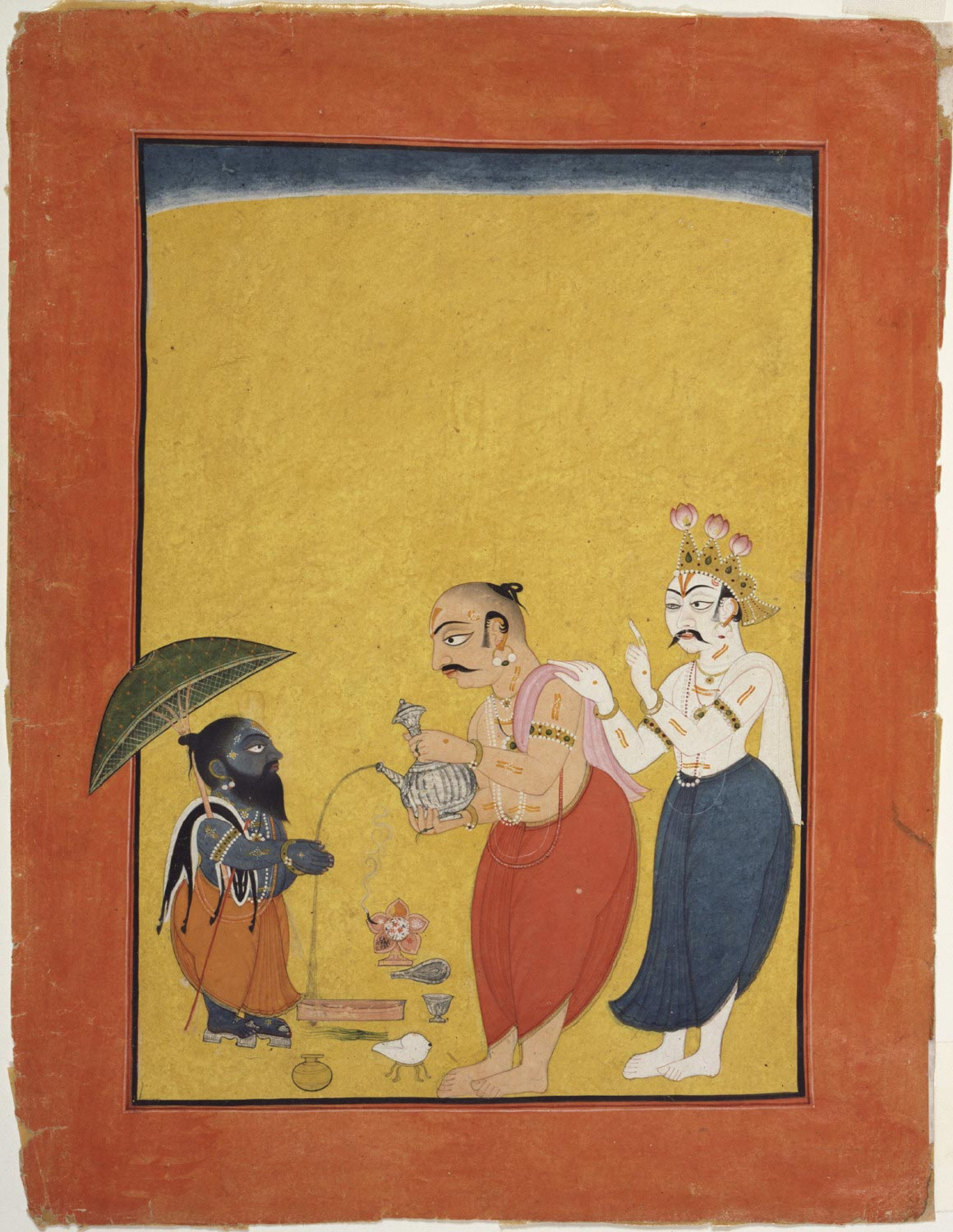
Vamana with Bali.

Consisting of 24 chapters, the eighth canto continues the dialogue between Sukadeva Gosvami and Pariksit on the banks of the Ganges river. A notable additional layer of dialogue is between the Vamana avatar and King Bali about the demon-King Hiranyakasipu. Topics covered include the:

- Details and ages of the four Manus (Svayambhuva, Svarocisa, Uttama, and Tamasa), and of the future Manus
- Elephant Gajendra, rescued from Makara the crocodile by Vishnu riding his mount Garuda, after prayers of surrender
- Battles between the demigods and the demons, the truce brokered by Vishnu, and churning of the ocean of milk by both factions
- Appearance of the Kurma, Dhanvantari, Mohini, and Ajita avatars (and Lakshmi) during the churning of the ocean of milk
- Second appearance of Mohini to beguile Shiva
- Annihilation of the demons by Indra
- Appearance of the Vamana avatar to take back the three worlds from King Bali in three footsteps, and the surrender of Bali to Him
- Appearance of the Matsya avatar to save devotee-King Satyavrata from the flood (during the time of Hiranyaksa in the third canto)

SB 8.5.30 original Sanskrit:

न यस्य कश्चातितितर्ति मायां
यया जनो मुह्यति वेद नार्थम् ।
तं निर्जितात्मात्मगुणं परेशं
नमाम भूतेषु समं चरन्तम् ॥ ३० ॥

Let us bow to that Ruler of the highest gods, moving qually in all created beings, whose Maya (deluding potency) nobody can overpass-that Māyā due to which men get bewildered and are unable to know the truth (their reality)-but vho has completely subdued that Maya-Sakti of His own and its properties (in the shape of Sattva, Rajas and Tamas).

In 7th chapter of eighth canto mentioned Shiva is also non different from Brahman. He is supreme ruler of the universe and the eternal refugee of all living beings.

Gita Press:

You are the supreme, mysterious Brahma (the Absolute), the Creator of all beings, (the gods, beasts and so on), high and low. It is You, the (supreme) Spirit, that stand manifested as the universe by virtue of (Your) manifold energies (in the form of Sattva, Rajas and Tamas) and are its Ruler (too).

— Canto 8, Chapter 7, Verse 24

29. The five sacred (Vedic) texts (known by the names of Tatpuruşa, Aghora, Sadyojäta, Vämadeva and Iśāna), O Lord, from (the thirty- eight parts of) which the thirty-eight fragmentary Mantras came into existence, constitute Your (five) faces (bearing the same names as the sacred texts themselves). Again, that self- effulgent Principle, constituting the supreme Reality, which is known by the name of Śiva, O Deity, is (nothing but) Your absolute state.

— Canto 8, Chapter 7, Verse 29

=== Ninth Canto ===
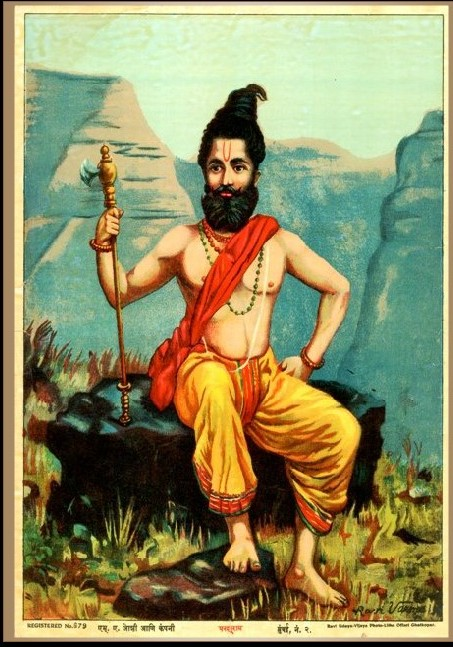
Parashurama

Consisting of 24 chapters, the ninth canto continues the dialogue between Sukadeva Gosvami and Pariksit on the banks of the Ganges river. With no notable additional layers of dialogue, the primary focus is upon the male dynasties of various ruling figures (the female sides are covered in the fourth canto). Topics covered include the:

- Pastimes of the Rama avatar that destroyed the demon-King Ravana (and Kumbhakarna; incarnations of Jaya and Vijaya)
- Appearance of the Parashurama avatar to repeatedly destroy the corrupt, Godless ruling (Kshatriya) class
- Genealogy and downfall of Saubhari Muni due to sex-desire (after seeing fish copulate), and his liberation through performing austerities
- Story of King Yayati, cursed to suffer old age; after passing the curse to his son, he learned the futility of sense-pleasure and achieved liberation
- Story of King Pururava, beguiled by the Apsara Urvasi, until he sated his lusty desires with a ceremonial fire
- Genealogies of the sons of Svayambhuva Manu, and of the Kings Mandhata, Amsuman, Yayati, Bharata, Ajamidha, Puru, and Pururava
- Genealogy of Krishna, and brief descriptions of His beauty and pastimes

SB 9.24.59.60 original Sanskrit:

अक्षौहिणीनां पतिभिरसुरैर्नृपलाञ्छनै: । भुव आक्रम्यमाणाया अभाराय कृतोद्यम: ॥ ५९ ॥

कर्माण्यपरिमेयाणि मनसापि सुरेश्वरैः ।

सहसङ्कर्षणश्चक्रे भगवान्मधुसूदनः ॥ ६० ॥

Endeavouring to remove the burden of the earth, which was overrun by demons disguised as kings, who led more than one Akşauhinīs, Śri Krsna (the slayer of the demon Madhu). accompanied by (His elder brother) Sarnkarsana (better known as Balarama), performed deeds which cannot be comprehended even in thought by the rulers of gods.

=== Tenth Canto ===
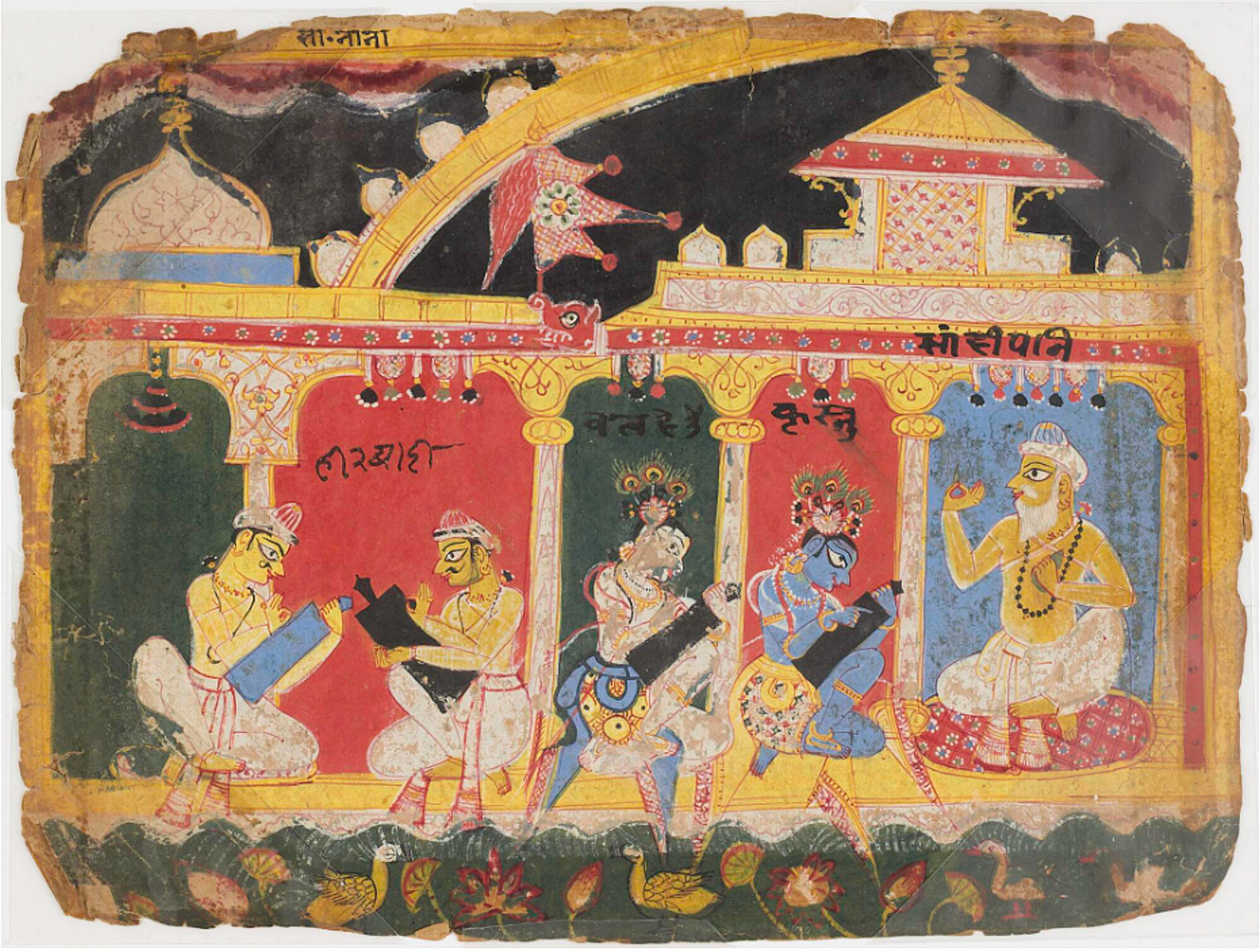
Krishna and Balarama Studying with the Brahman Sandipani (Bhagavata Purana, 1525-1550 CE print). Krishna in blue is seated next to Balarama, both wearing peacock-feather headdresses, in front of their teacher Sandipani. Two other students appear on the left.

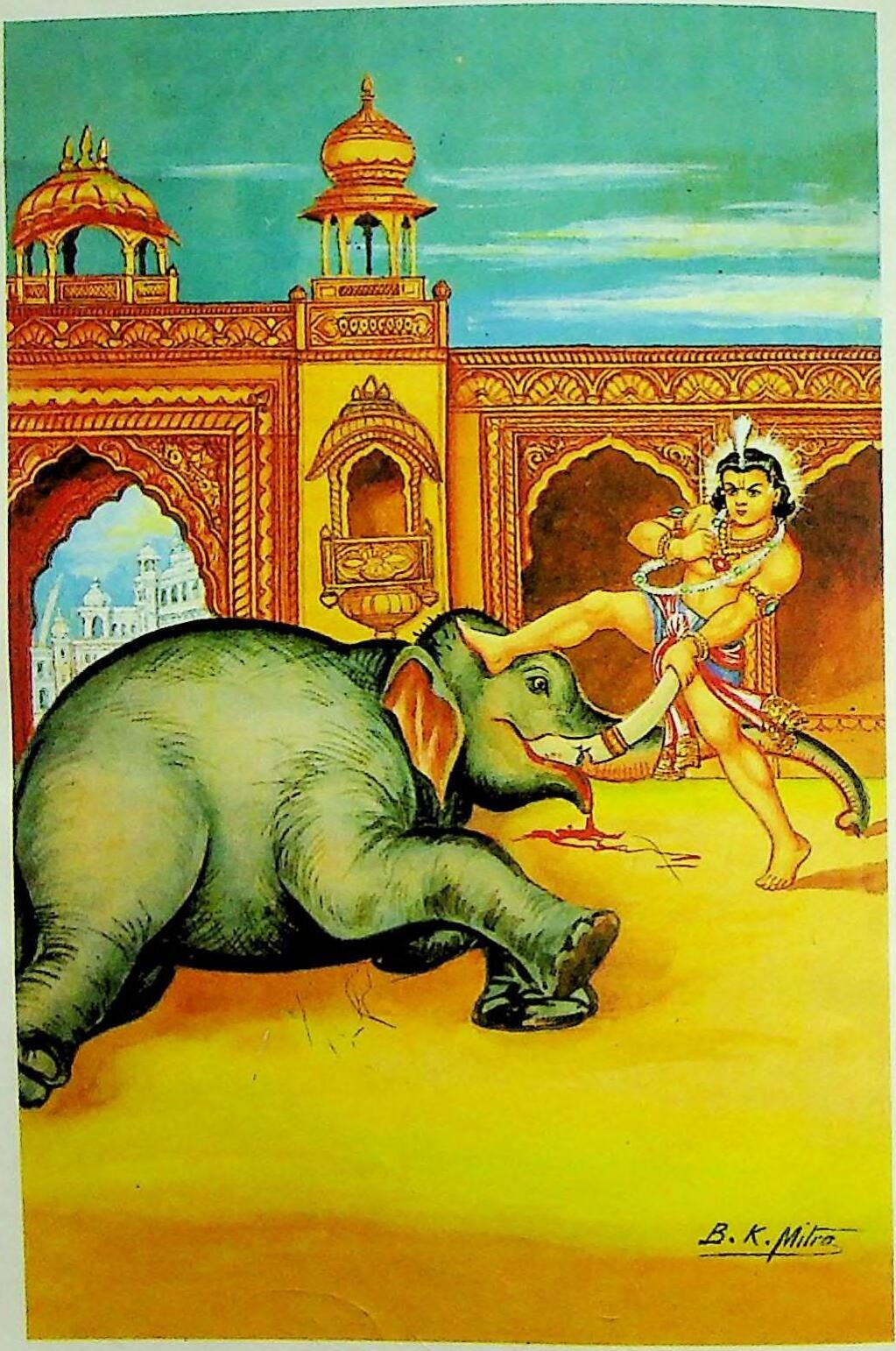
Kuvalayapida Slain

Consisting of 90 chapters, the tenth canto continues the dialogue between Sukadeva Gosvami and Pariksit on the banks of the Ganges river. Notable additional layers of dialogue all involve the lila (divine play) of the supreme and transcendental Krishna avatar.

- Imprisonment of Krishna's parents (Vasudeva and Devaki), the murder of His siblings, and attempted murder of baby Krishna by King Kamsa
- Fostering of Krishna and Balarama by Nanda and Yashoda (Gopas, a tribe of cowherds); Yashoda saw the universal form in boy-Krishna's mouth
- Attempts on baby and boy-Krishna's life by various demons, mostly sent by Kamsa (e.g. Putana, Trnavarta, Aghasura, Pralamba, Kesi, etc.)
- Chastisement of Kaliya, swallowing of a forest fire, lifting of Govardhana Hill, stealing of Gopis' clothes, and the Rasa dance
- Defeat of numerous demons (e.g. Kamsa, Jarasandha, Kalayavana, Narakasura, Paundraka, etc.)
- Marriages to over 16,000 wives rescued from Narkasura (and children with each), establishment of Dvaraka, return of the Syamantaka Jewel, and washing of Narada's feet
- Defeat of Banasura and Shiva, daily activities, blessing of Sudama, blessing of His devotees, saving of Shiva from Vrkasura, and summary of glories

SB 10.90.50 original Sanskrit:

मर्त्यस्तयानुसवमेधितया मुकुन्द-
श्रीमत्कथाश्रवणकीर्तनचिन्तयैति ।
तद्धाम दुस्तरकृतान्तजवापवर्गं
ग्रामाद् वनं क्षितिभुजोऽपि ययुर्यदर्था: ॥ ५० ॥

By listening to, chanting and contemplating on the charming stories of Bhagavān Sri Krsna every moment, man develops the devotion which leads him to the (supreme) sphere of the Lord. (True,) it is (most) difficult to reach beyond the jurisdiction of Time; but in the Lord's realm Time has no sway. Even rulers of the earth have left their kingdom and retired to the forest for (the performance of austerities with the object of) gaining that eternal realm. (Therefore, one should constantly engage oneself in hearing the stories of the Lord.)

The first nine books of the Bhagavata Purana function as a prologue, discussing previous incarnations of Vishnu and the principles of bhakti-yoga. The Tenth Book presents the goal of this path: Krishna himself. The text prioritizes Krishna as the supreme absolute truth and personal godhead (bhagavan svayam), rather than as a derivative incarnation of Vishnu.

The narrative is divided into two distinct sections: Krishna's childhood pastimes in the forests of Vrindavan (Braj lila) and his later adult activities in Mathura and Dvaraka. The Braj lila section is particularly noted for depicting God as a child absorbed in lila (divine play) stealing butter, hiding from his mother, and playing with his companions without an apparent formal mission or agenda.

A central theological concept in this book is yogamaya (divine illusion), a spiritual power that masks Krishna's overwhelming majesty to allow his most intimate devotees to relate to him spontaneously as a friend, child, or lover. The Tenth Book presents itself as a literary incarnation of God (vangamayavatara), asserting that those who hear, read, and contemplate these stories are interacting directly with the divine.

==== Study ====
The largest canto with 4,000 verses, the tenth canto is also the most popular and widely studied part of the Bhagavata. It has also been translated, commented on, and published separately from the rest of the Srimad Bhagavatam.

=== Eleventh Canto ===
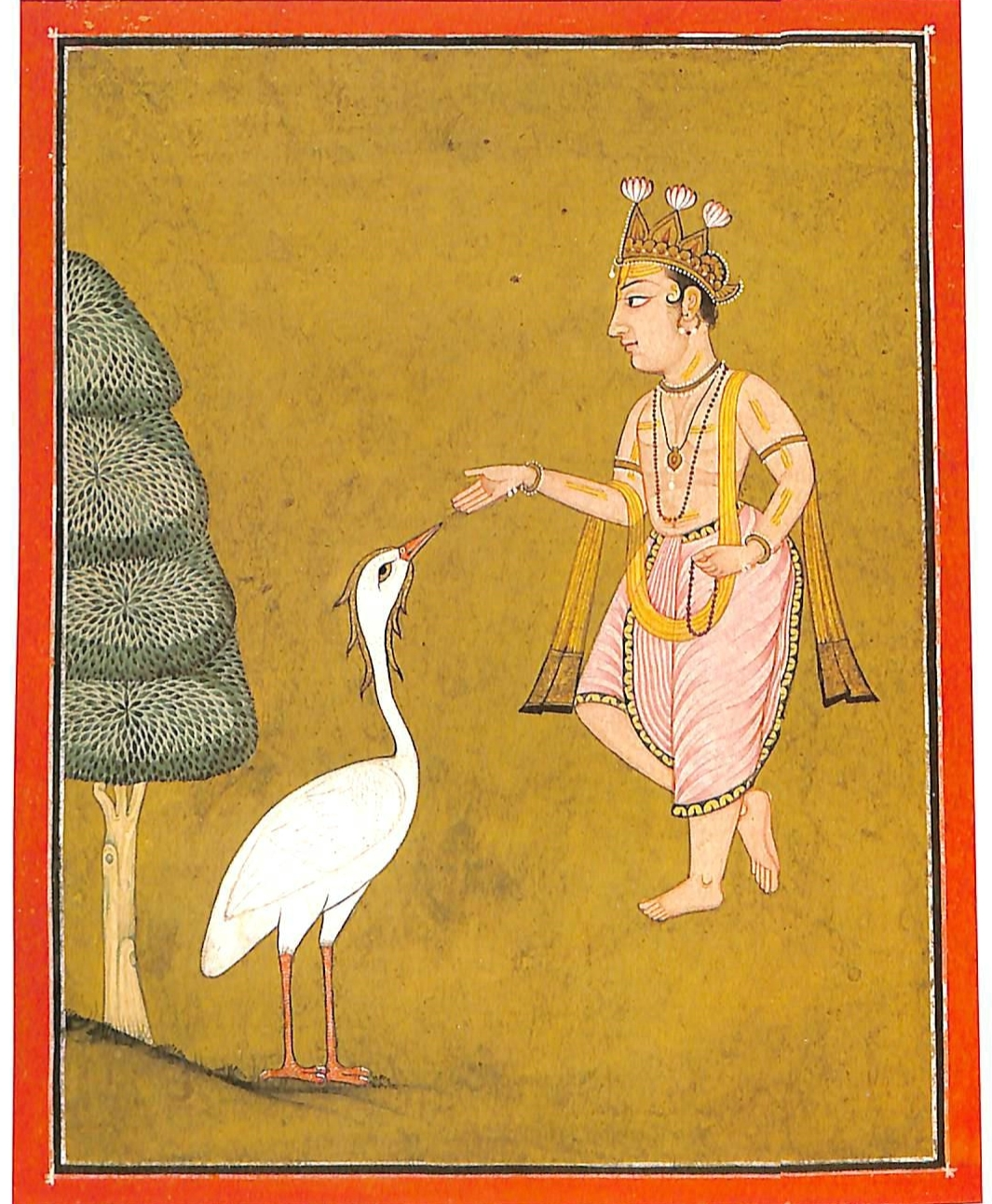
Hamsa

Consisting of 31 chapters, the eleventh canto continues the dialogue between Sukadeva Gosvami and Pariksit on the banks of the Ganges river. Notable additional layers of dialogue are between Narada and Vasudeva, and between Krishna and Uddhava (and in turn, other dialogues such as that between the Hamsa (swan) avatar and Brahma). Topics covered include the:

- Curse and destruction of the Yadu Dynasty (through intoxicated in-fighting) at Prabhasa to relieve the burden of the Earth
- Appearance of the Hamsa (swan) avatar to answer the questions of the sons of Brahma
- Discourse of Narada to Vasudeva about the instruction of the '9 Yogendras' to King Nimi about Bhakti for Krishna
- Final teachings of Krishna to Uddhava at Dvaraka (e.g. the story of a young Brahmin avadhuta narrating his 24 gurus to King Yadu)
- Disappearance of Krishna after being shot in the foot by the hunter, Jara
- Flood and destruction of Dvarka

SB 11.7.33–35 original Sanskrit:

पृथिवी वायुराकाशमापोऽग्निश्चन्द्रमा रवि: ।
कपोतोऽजगर: सिन्धु: पतङ्गो मधुकृद् गज: ॥ ३३ ॥
मधुहाहरिणो मीन: पिङ्गला कुररोऽर्भक: ।
कुमारी शरकृत् सर्प ऊर्णनाभि: सुपेशकृत् ॥ ३४ ॥
एते मे गुरवो राजन् चतुर्विंशतिराश्रिता: ।
शिक्षा वृत्तिभिरेतेषामन्वशिक्षमिहात्मन: ॥ ३५ ॥

The earth, the air, the sky, water, fire, the moon and the sun, the dove, the boa-constrictor, the sea, the moth, the honey-bee, the elephant, the honey-gatherer, the deer, the fish, Pingala (a courtesan), the osprey, the infant, the maiden, the forger of arrows, the serpent, the spider and the Bhrnga (a kind of wasp) these twenty-four have been accepted, O king, by me as preceptors. From the conduct of these have I learnt all that I had to learn in this life for my good.

==== The Uddhava or Hamsa Gita ====
Containing the final teachings of Krishna to His devotee Uddhava, the eleventh canto is also referred to as the 'Uddhava Gita' or 'Hamsa Gita'. Like the tenth canto, it has also been translated and published separately, usually as a companion or 'sequel' to the Bhagavad Gita. 'Hamsa' means 'swan' or 'spirit', and:

- Is the name of the single class or order of society in Satya Yuga (as compared to four in Kali Yuga), the first and purest of the four cyclical yugas
- Symbolises Brahman (Ultimate Truth, Self, or Atman) in Hinduism
- Is the mount ridden by Brahma
- Is the name of the tenth (i.e. swan) avatar of Vishnu that taught the Vedas to Brahma (hence the symbolism of the swan being ridden by Brahma as a mount).

=== Twelfth Canto ===
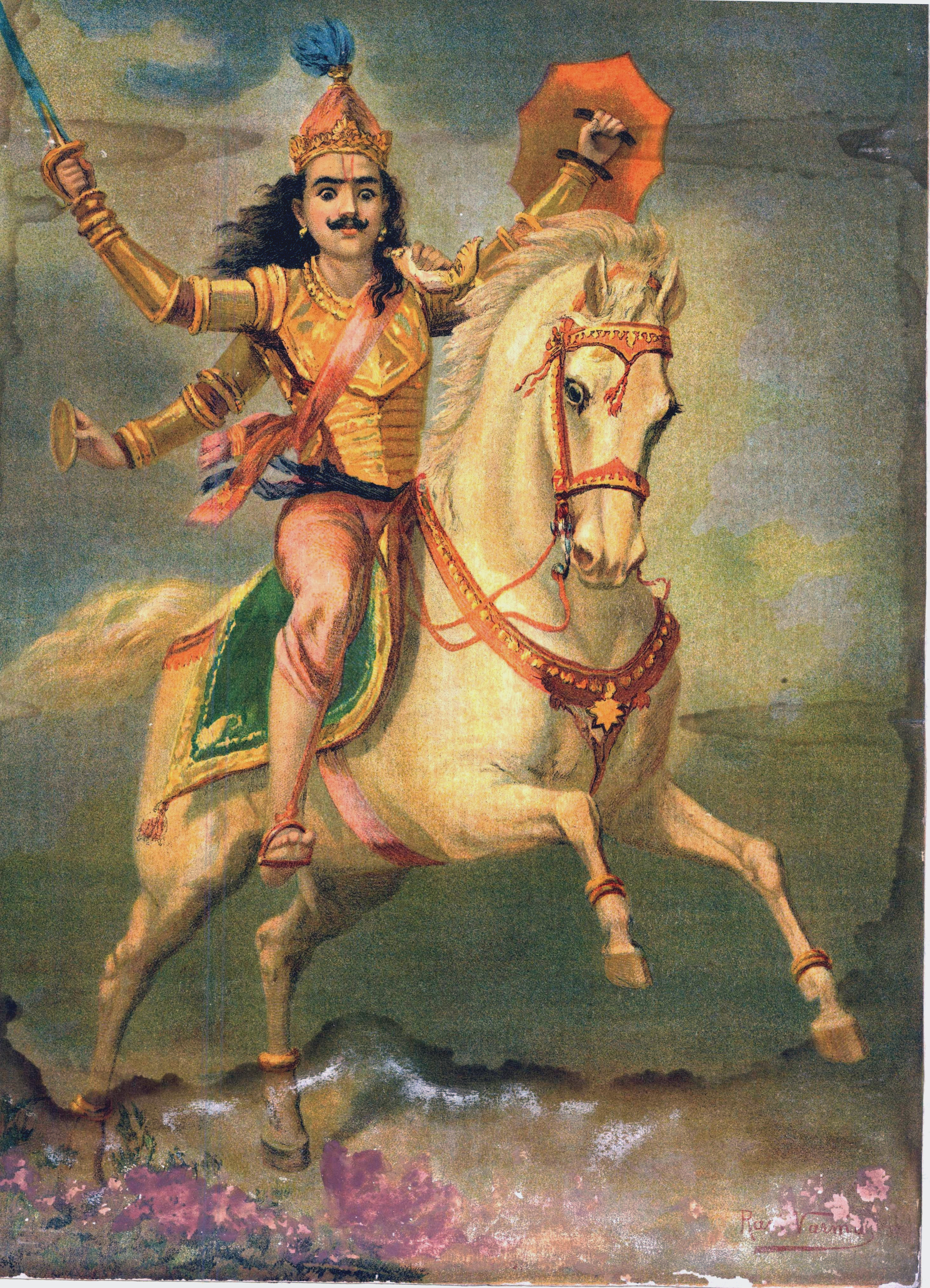
Kalki

Consisting of 13 chapters, the twelfth and final canto completes the dialogue between Sukadeva Gosvami and Pariksit on the banks of the Ganges river, and ends with the overarching dialogue between Sukadeva Gosvami and the group of sages led by Saunaka, at the forest of Naimisaranya. Focusing on prophecies and signs of Kali Yuga, topics covered in this canto include the:

- Degradation of rulers as liars and plunderers, and the symptoms of the age of Kali (e.g. atheism, political intrigue, low character of royals, etc.)
- A list of the future rulers of the world, and the way they attained downfall
- Final instructions to and death of Pariksit due to his curse (bitten by a poisonous serpent Takshaka)
- Prayers of sage Markandeya to Nara-Narayana, resistance to Kamadeva sent by Indra to break his vows, and glorification by Shiva and Uma
- Four categories of universal annihilation
- Appearance of the Kalki avatar to destroy evil at the end of Kali Yuga
- Description of the lesser and greater Puranas, and the eighteen major Puranas
- Description of the Mahapurusa
- Summary and glories of the Srimad Bhagavatam

SB 12.13.11–12 original Sanskrit:

आदिमध्यावसानेषु वैराग्याख्यानसंयुतम् ।
हरिलीलाकथाव्रातामृतानन्दितसत्सुरम् ॥ ११ ॥
सर्ववेदान्तसारं यद ब्रह्मात्मैकत्वलक्षणम् ।
वस्त्वद्वितीयं तन्निष्ठं कैवल्यैकप्रयोजनम् ॥ १२ ॥

It has been enriched at the beginning, in the middle and at the end with legends illustrating the glory of Dispassion and has been delighting the righteous as well as the gods with its nectar-like stories describing the pastimes of Lord Śri Hari. (11) It has for its theme that one reality without a second—which is the sum and substance of all the Upaniṣads (which are the culmination of the Vedas) and has been characterized as the oneness of Brahma (the Absolute) and the (individual) soul—and has detachment of the Spirit from Matter as its only object.

== Philosophy ==
According to Sanskritist T. S. Rukmani, while Bhakti Yoga and Dvaita Vedanta are the prominent teachings, various passages show a synthesis that also includes Samkhya, Yoga, Vedanta, and Advaita Vedanta. Interpretations from different traditions, for example nondual Advaita Vedanta and Vaishnava theology, coexisted with each other.

=== Bhakti ===
Scholar of Tamil poetry, Norman Cutler states the Bhagavata Purana is among the most important texts on bhakti, elaborating on bhakti as it appears in the Bhagavad Gita. Bryant states that while classical yoga attempts to shut down the mind and senses, Bhakti Yoga in the Bhagavata teaches that the mind is transformed by filling it with thoughts of Krishna.

Matchett states that the narratives themselves are a form of teaching. In addition to various didactic philosophical passages, the Bhagavata also describes one of the activities that can lead to liberation (moksha) as listening to, reflecting on the stories of, and sharing devotion for Vishnu with others. Bhakti is depicted in the Purana, adds Matchett, as both an overpowering emotion as well as a way of life that is rational and deliberately cultivated. Bhakti is not just physical displays of intense emotion, but an appropriate response once one has understood the true nature of reality.

Since the fourteenth century, Saiva philosophers engaged with the Bhagavata Purana, using Vaisnava bhakti to support their Saiva commitments.

The Bhagavata says that devotion is tamasic if it is motivated by arrogance, jealousy, or hypocrisy. It is rajasic if motivated by fame, wealth, or power.

=== Samkhya ===
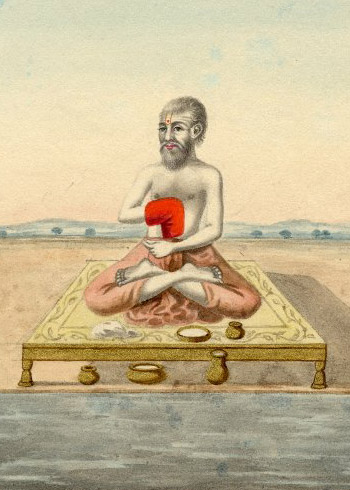
Kapila Muni.

Surendranath Dasgupta identifies the theistic Sāṁkhya presented by Kapila in the third skandha as a foundational framework of the text. Samkhya terminology is used throughout the Bhagavata, but it is specifically invoked as a teaching in canto 3 and 11.

The classical dualistic Sāṁkhya set out in the Sāṁkhyakārikā sets forth an unbridgeable ontological divide between inert nature (prakṛti) and pure consciousness (puruṣa). In the Bhagavata, on the other hand, the twenty-four elements are not autonomous, but dependent on Krishna, who is identified as the supreme purusa. Mental faculties such as intellect (buddhi) and ego (ahaṅkāra) are classified as subtle material evolutions animated solely by divine immanence. In this model, the mind is not dependent on the brain and consciousness exists outside of matter.

Sheridan and Dasgupta note the integration of Samkhya with the Bhagavata's teachings on devotion. The renunciation that it encourages is one that naturally occurs out of love for God.

In canto 11, the Bhagavata acknowledges that there are different schools of Samkhya. However it says these differences in counting the number of elements is not actually a difference. Reason being, Samkhya considers cause and effect to be substantially identical.

=== Advaita ===
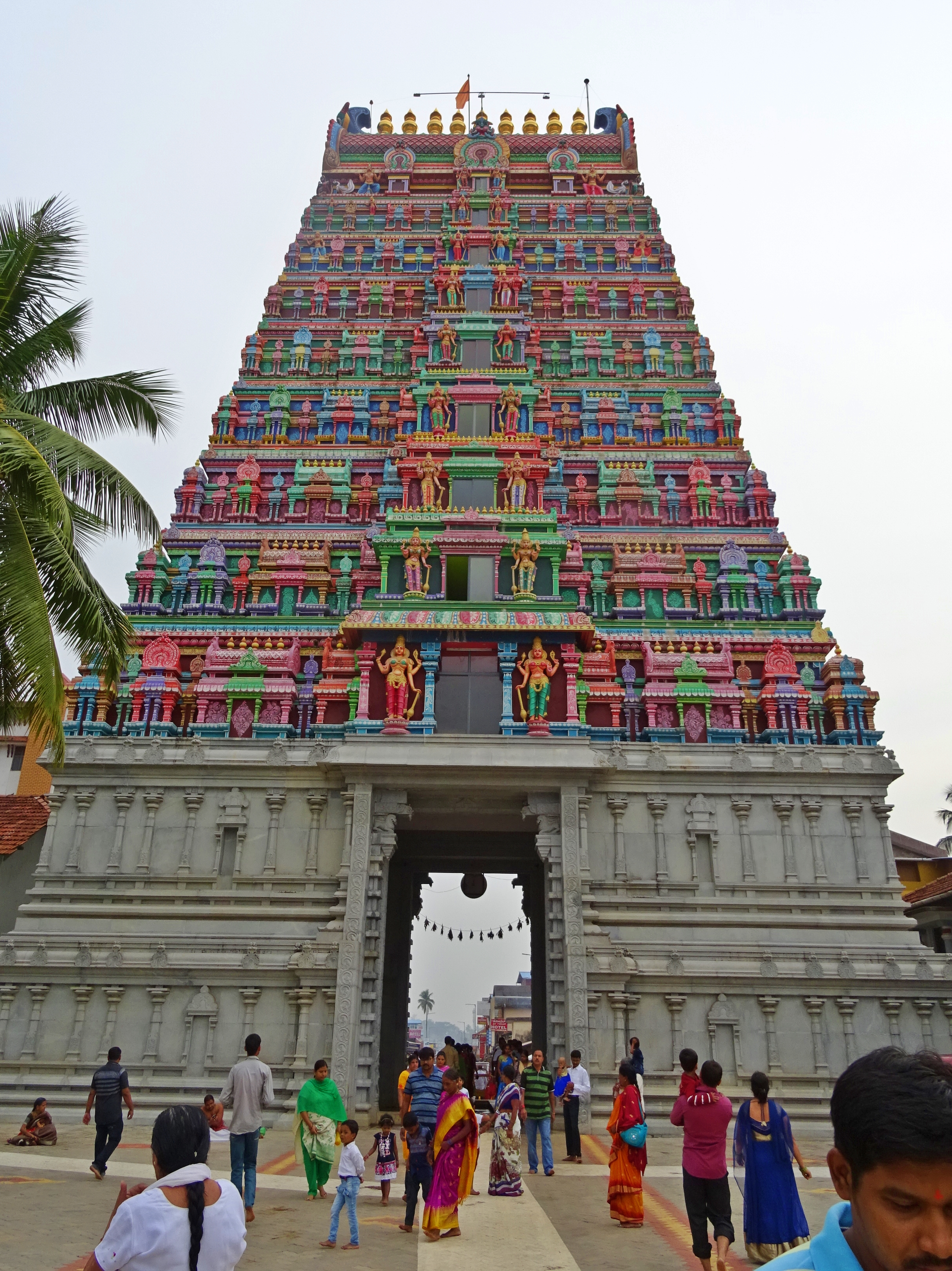
Sringeri Sharada Peetham is one of the Hindu Advaita Vedanta matha or monastery established by Adi Shankara.

Sheridan states that the Bhagavata frequently discusses a distinctly advaitic or non-dualistic philosophy of Shankara, but does not forgo plurality. Rukmani adds that the concept of moksha is explained as Ekatva (Oneness) and Sayujya (Absorption, intimate union), wherein one is completely lost in Brahman (Self, Supreme Being, one's true nature). This, states Rukmani, is proclamation of a 'return of the individual soul to the Absolute and its merging into the Absolute', which is unmistakably advaitic. As an example:

The aim of life is inquiry into the Truth, and not the desire for enjoyment in heaven by performing religious rites,
Those who possess the knowledge of the Truth, call the knowledge of non-duality as the Truth,
It is called Brahman, the Highest Self, and Bhagavan.

— Sūta, Bhagavata Purana 1.2.10–11, Translated by Daniel Sheridan

Sheridan credits the Bhāgavata with a 'truly creative religious moment' for introducing a philosophy that addresses the question of whether God is transcendent or immanent. Brown terms it as "Advaitic Theism," which combines the seemingly contradictory beliefs of a personal God that can be worshiped with a God that is immanent in creation and in one's own self. God in this philosophy is within and is not different from the individual self, states Sheridan, and transcends the limitations of specificity and temporality. Sheridan, approaching the Bhagavata Purana with methods for New Testament scholarship, describe this philosophy as built on the foundation of non-dualism in the Upanishads.

Bryant states that the monism in Bhagavata Purana is certainly built on Vedanta foundations, but not exactly the same as the monism of Adi Shankara. The Bhagavata asserts, according to Bryant, that the empirical and the spiritual universe are both metaphysical realities, and manifestations of the same Oneness, just like heat and light are "real but different" manifestations of sunlight. Bryant notes that the tenth book of the Bhagavata does not, as is conventional for non-dualist schools, understand Krishna's form to be a "secondary derivation," which can be subsumed within the impersonal absolute. Rather than describe Brahman to be ultimately formless, the tenth book ascribes an "eternal personal element" to Brahman.

Edelman notes that the Bhagavata Purana repeatedly distinguishes between the atman and Paramatman. The individual atman depends on Paramatman for its liberation. Moreoever, Paramatman cannot be under illusion. Atman and Paramatman are non-different in the sense that they have the same spiritual nature.

=== Dharma ===
The Dharma wheel

Dasgupta states the Bhagavata Purana conceptualizes dharma as supreme devotion to God, a natural consequence of realizing the knowledge of God and the self. Dharma as defined, is framed to be superior than dharma that is for sense-gratification.

The text does not subscribe, states Gupta and Valpey, to context-less "categorical notions of justice or morality", but suggests that "Dharma depends on context". They add that in a positive or neutral context, ethics and moral behavior must be adhered to; and when persistently persecuted by evil, anything that reduces the strength of the "evil and poisonous circumstances" is good. That which is motivated by, furthers, and enables bhakti is the golden standard of Dharma.

Scholarly consensus sees bhakti as a post-Vedic movement that developed primarily during the Puranas era of Indian history. The Bhagavata Purana develops the Bhakti concept more elaborately, states Cutler, proposing "worship without ulterior motive and with kind disposition towards all" as Dharma. T.R. Sharma states the text includes in its scope intellectual and emotional devotion as well as Advaita Vedanta ideas.

=== Yoga ===
Sarma states that the Bhagavata Purana describes all steps of yoga practice, and characterizes yoga as bhakti, asserting that the most important aspect is the spiritual goal. According to Sarma and Rukmani, the text dedicates numerous chapters to yoga, such as Canto 10 (chapter 11), which begins with a declaration that Siddhi results from concentrating one's mind on Krishna, adding this substitutes the concept of a "personal god" in the Yogasutras of Patanjali, and contrasts with Patanjali's view that Siddhi is considered powerful but an obstacle to Samadhi.

In other chapters of the text, Rukmani states, Śuka describes different meditations on aspects of Krishna, in a way that is similar to the Yoga Sutras of Patanjali. However, adds Bryant, the Bhagavata Purana recommends the object of concentration as Krishna, thus folding in yoga as a form of bhakti and the "union with the divine". Bryant describes the synthesis of ideas in Bhagavata Purana as:

The philosophy of the Bhagavata is a mixture of Vedanta terminology, Samkhyan metaphysics and devotionalized Yoga praxis. (...) The tenth book promotes Krishna as the highest absolute personal aspect of godhead – the personality behind the term Ishvara and the ultimate aspect of Brahman.

— Edwin Bryant, Krishna: A Sourcebook

Sheridan as well as Pintchman affirm Bryant's view, adding that the Vedantic view emphasized in the Bhagavata is non-dualist, as described within a reality of plural forms.

=== Maya ===
In Vedanta, Maya is frequently depicted as a deceptive or deluding energy. It is the illusion that makes the atman identify as the body. As a consequence, one gets attached to material enjoyments. The Bhagavata prescribes devotion to God as the means to overcome the illusion of maya. The Bhagavata Purana also presents Maya as divine energy through which Krishna manifests the material universe, including its elements, universes, bodies, senses, and minds, contributing to the richness and diversity of the phenomenal world. This process is not just entrapment but also a path to liberation for beings caught in the cycle of birth and death. Maya's illusionary powers, though binding individuals to temporal existence, ultimately facilitate their spiritual growth and release.

=== Suffering ===
In explaining suffering, the Bhagavata Purana acknowledges karma as a central principle, where actions in past lives influence current and future existences, shaping one's destiny and experiences in subsequent lifetimes. However, it also critiques the adequacy of karma in fully explaining suffering and explores time (kala) as a significant factor in suffering. Time, personified by Sudarshana Chakra, is shown as an unstoppable force that brings both end and renewal, acting indiscriminately upon all beings. Despite time's overwhelming power, the text suggests that sincere devotion (bhakti) to God and surrender to the divine can enable devout souls to overcome the influence of time and karma, ultimately leading to spiritual liberation (moksha).

=== Lila ===
The Bhagavata Purana argues that the play of God (lila) is central to understanding his actions in the world. Despite having everything and being able to make his wishes reality, Krishna engages in various activities and interactions with devotees out of joy and divine play, rather than out of any necessity or compulsion (SB 1.10.24). By participating in Krishna's lila, individuals can transcend the limitations and suffering of the material world and ultimately achieve liberation from time's constraints.

== Significance ==
The source of many popular stories of Krishna's pastimes for centuries in the Indian subcontinent, the Bhagavata Purana is widely recognized as the best-known and most influential of the Puranas, and as a part of Vedic literature (the Puranas, Itihasa epics, and Upanishads) is referred to as the "Fifth Veda". It is important in Indian religious literature for its emphasis on the practice of devotion compared to the more theoretical approach of the Bhagavad Gita, for challenging the ritualism of the Vedas, and for its extended description of a God in human form.

The Srimad Bhagavatam is the very essence of all the Vedanta literature. One who has enjoyed the nectar of its rasa never has any desire for anything else.

— Bhagavata Purana 12.13.15, Translated by David Haberman

=== Relation to other texts ===
Scholars note that the Bhagavata Purana brings together various schools of thought. Sheridan details that the Bhagavata Purana shares ideas with the Mahabharata, Harivamsa, Vedanta sutras, the Vishnu Purana, and the Alvars' poems. Scholar of the Bhagavata Purana, Edwin Bryant argues that the Bhagavata Purana is a mix of Vedanta terminology and Samkhya metaphysics. Edelmann writes that the Bhagavata Purana's metaphysics, philosophy of mind, and theory of matter is built on Sankhya.

==== Vedas and Upanishads ====
The Bhagavata Purana aligns itself with canonical texts like Brahma Sutras and Rigveda by echoing their verses at various points throughout its narrative. It claims equality with the Vedas and reinterprets their themes to emphasize the supremacy of Krishna. It transforms the descriptions of Vishnu's deeds found in the Vishnu Sukta into narratives centered around Krishna's actions (verse 10.51.38). It expands on the Purusha Sukta found in the Rigveda. Its cosmology is similar to that in the Brhadaranyaka Upanishad.

==== Bhagavad Gita ====
The Bhagavata Purana does not directly reference the Bhagavad Gita, which is part of the Mahabharata. Instead, it includes the teachings similar to those found in the Bhagavad Gita in the form of dialogues between Krishna and Uddhava in Canto 11.

=== Hindu Festivals ===
The stories in the Bhagavata Purana are also the legends quoted by one generation to the next in Vaishnavism, during annual festivals such as Holi and Diwali.

The International Society for Krishna Consciousness (ISKCON) celebrates the promise of Canto 12, Chapter 13, Verse 13 by distributing sets of Srimad Bhagavatam leading up to the full-moon day of the month of Bhādra (Bhādra Purnima) in India and around the world.

=== Vaishnavism ===
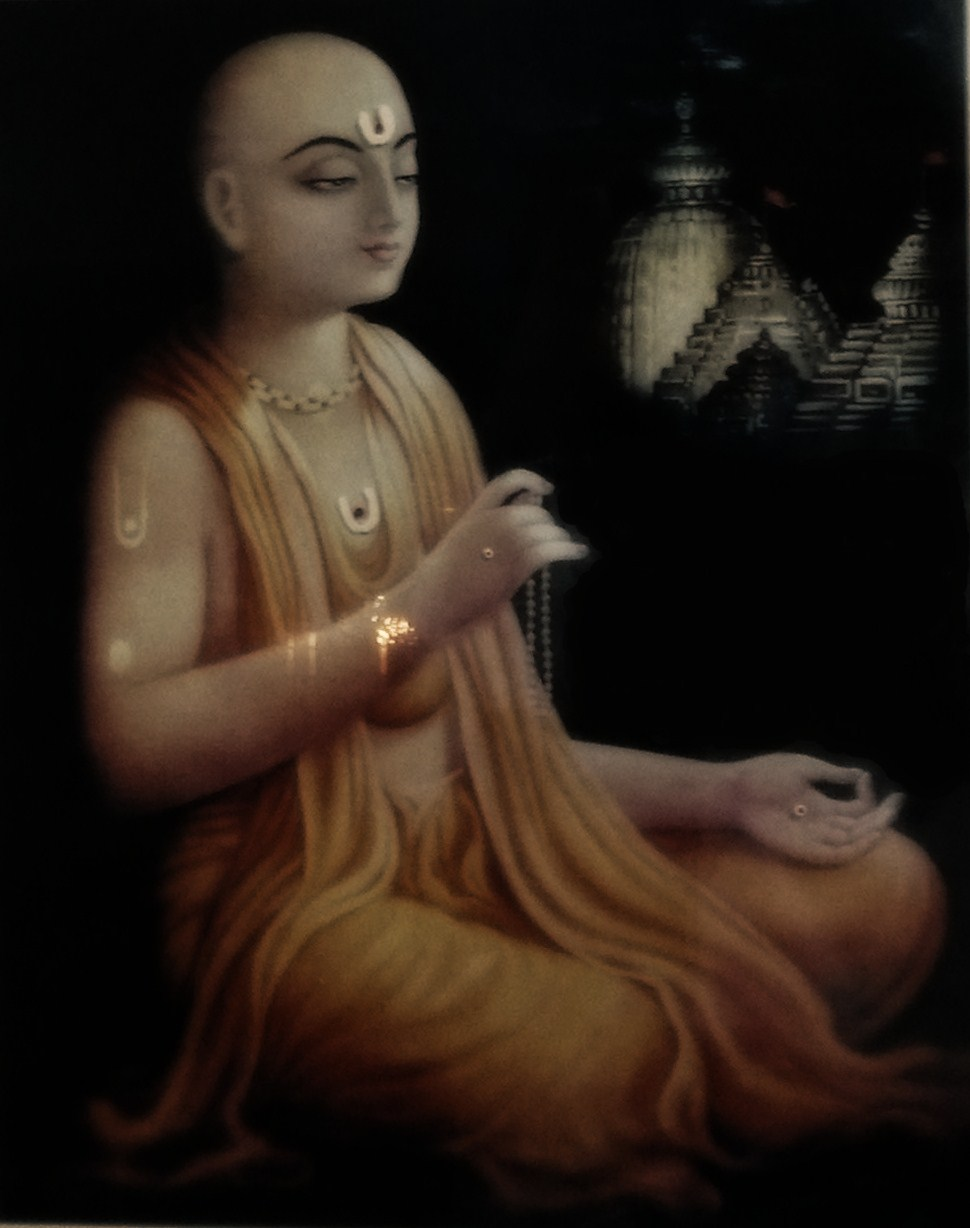
Chaitanya (1486–1534 CE)

==== Gaudiya Vaishnavism ====
The Bhagavata has played a significant role in the emergence of the Krishna-bhakti (Gaudiya Vaishnavism) movement of Chaitanya (1486–1534 CE), in Bengal. The scriptural basis for the belief that Chaitanya is an avatar of Krishna is found in verses such as the following (Disciples of Swami Prabhupada translation):

In the Age of Kali, intelligent persons perform congregational chanting to worship the incarnation of Godhead who constantly sings the names of Kṛṣṇa. Although His complexion is not blackish, He is Kṛṣṇa Himself. He is accompanied by His associates, servants, weapons and confidential companions.

— Canto 11, Chapter 5, Verse 32

The Bhagavata is also used to explain why Chaitanya is taken as an avatara of Krishna, despite not being named (unlike others such as Kalki) in the Bhagavata:

In this way, my Lord, You appear in various incarnations as a human being, an animal, a great saint, a demigod, a fish or a tortoise, thus maintaining the entire creation in different planetary systems and killing the demoniac principles. According to the age, O my Lord, You protect the principles of religion. In the Age of Kali, however, You do not assert Yourself as the Supreme Personality of Godhead, and therefore You are known as Triyuga, or the Lord who appears in three yugas.

— Canto 7, Chapter 9, Verse 38

The key word in this verse in regards to Krishna incarnating in the age of Kali Yuga is 'channaḥ' (Sanskrit छन्न), which means ' hidden', 'secret', or 'disguised'. In Gaudiya Vaishnavism, Chaitanya is accepted as a hidden avatar of Krishna who appeared in the age of Kali (also known as 'the Iron Age' and 'the age of quarrel') as His own devotee to show the easiest way to achieve Krishna Consciousness. Modern Gaudiya movements such as the Gaudiya Math (established by Bhaktisiddhanta Sarasvati in 1920) and others established by disciples of Bhaktisiddhanta Sarasvati, such as the International Society for Krishna Consciousness (by A. C. Bhaktivedanta Swami Prabhupada in 1966) and the Sri Chaitanya Saraswat Math (by Bhakti Rakshak Sridhar in 1941), trace their disciplic lineages back directly to Chaitanya.

==== Other Vaishnava Traditions ====
In the 15th–16th century Ekasarana Dharma in Assam, a panentheistic tradition whose proponents, Sankardeva and Madhavdeva, acknowledge that their theological positions are rooted in the Bhagavata Purana, though omitting Pancharatra theology and adding a monist commentary instead.

In northern and western India the Bhagavata Purana has influenced the Hari Bhakti Vilasa and Haveli-style Krishna temples found in Braj region near Mathura-Vrindavan. The text complements the Pancharatra Agama texts of Vaishnavism. While the text focuses on Krishna "Narayana (Vishnu) himself appears and explains how Brahma and Shiva should never be seen as independent and different from him". The sixth book includes the feminine principle as Shakti, or goddess Devi, conceptualizing her as the "energy and creative power" of the masculine yet a manifestation of a sexless Brahman, presented in a language suffused with Hindu monism.

Vallabha accepted the Bhagavata Purana as one of four authoritative texts in his tradition.

=== Jainism and Buddhism ===
The fifth canto of the Bhagavata Purana is significant for its inclusion of legends about the first Tirthankara of Jainism, Rishabha, as an avatar of Vishnu. Further, his father Nabhi is mentioned as one of the Manus and his mother Marudevi also finds a mention. It further mentions the 100 sons of Rishabha including Bharata. While homage to Shakyamuni Buddha is included by declaring him as an avatar of Vishnu, the interpretation of Buddhism-related stories in the Purana range from honor to ambivalence to polemics wherein prophecies predict some will distort and misrepresent the teachings of the Vedas, and attempt to sow confusion.

=== The Arts ===
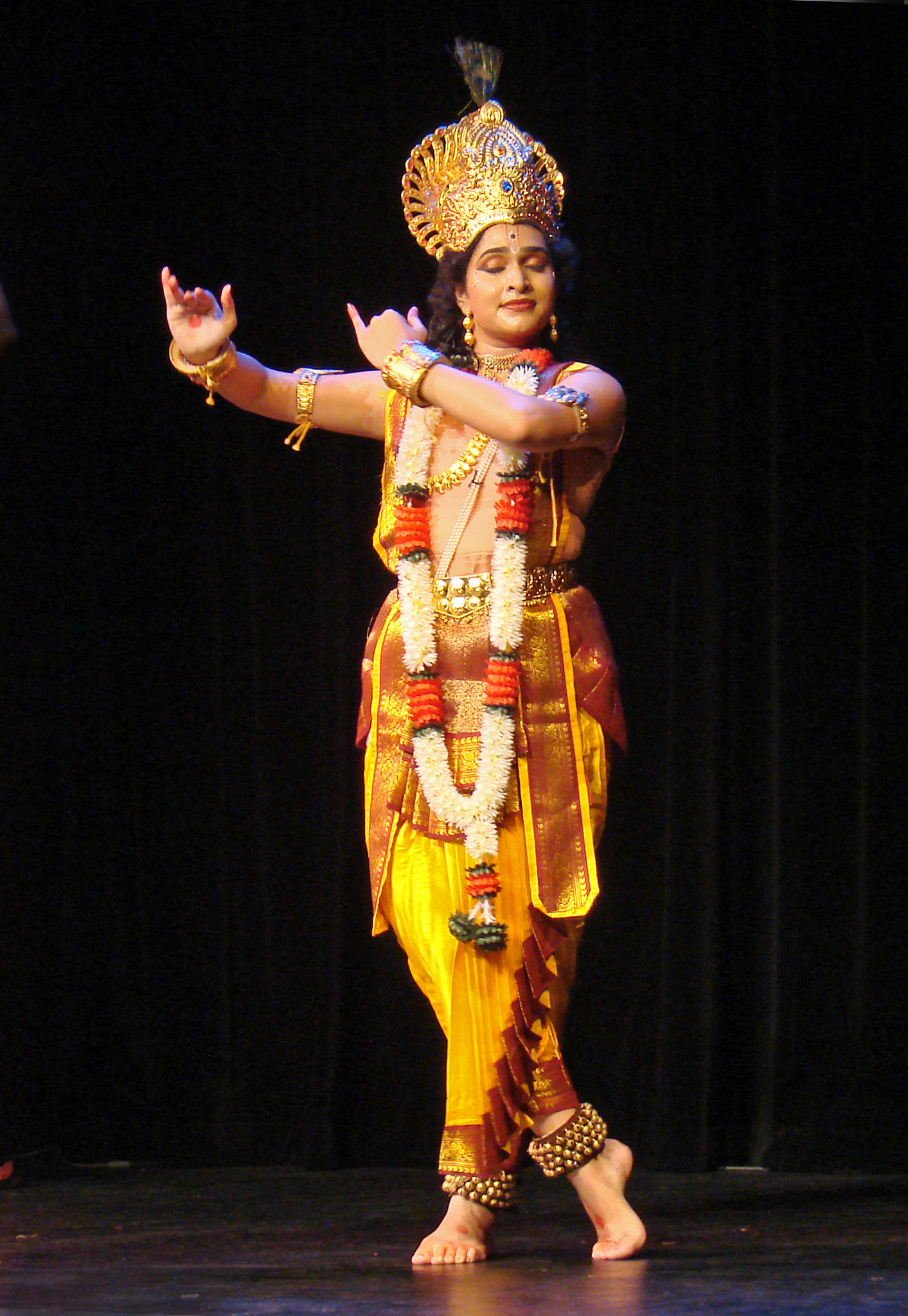
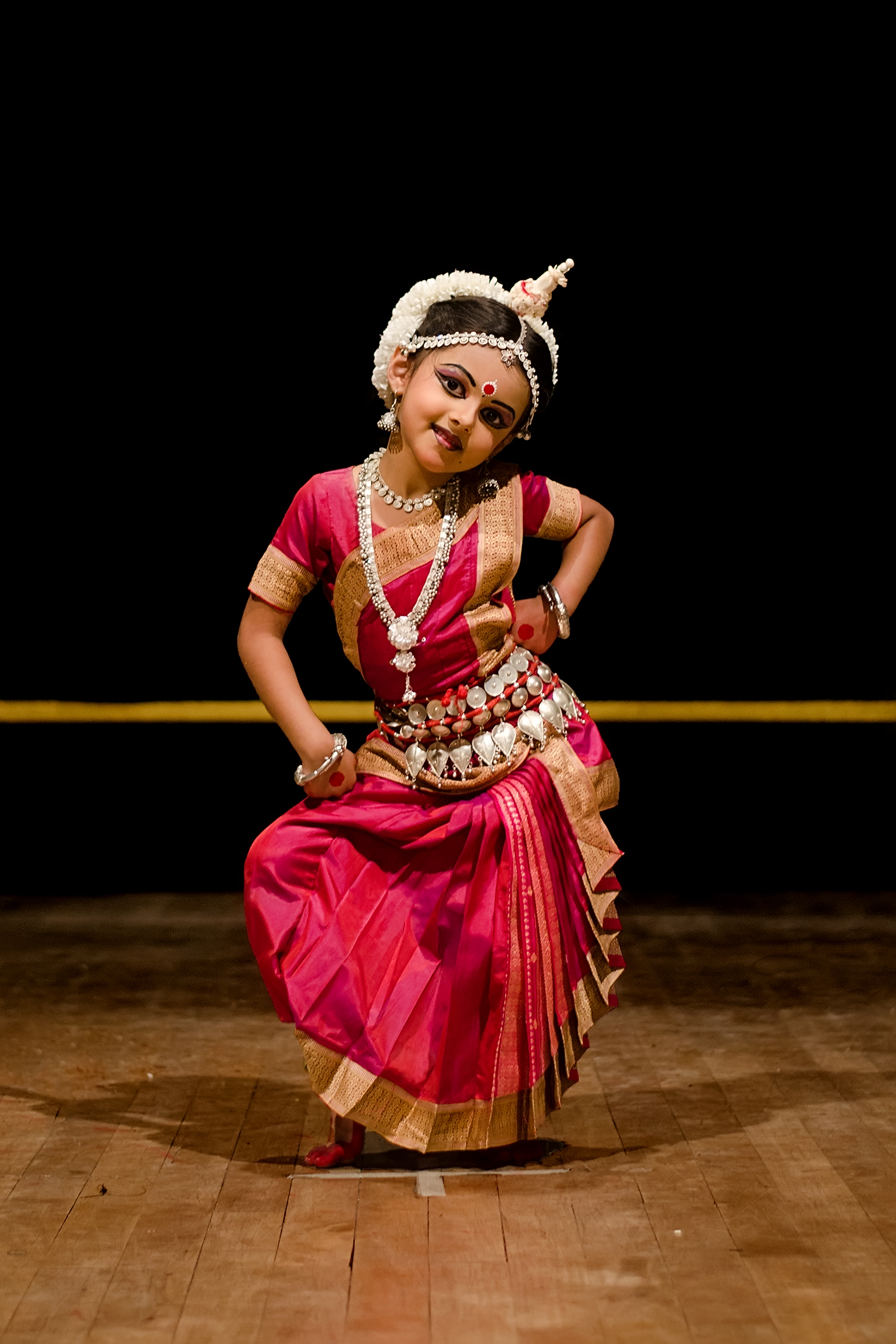
The Bhagavata Purana was a significant text in the bhakti movement and the culture of India. Dance and theatre arts such as Kathakali (left), Kuchipudi (middle) and Odissi (right) portray legends from the Purana.

The Bhagavata Purana played a key role in the history of Indian theatre, music, and dance, particularly through the tradition of Ras Leela. These are dramatic enactments about Krishna's pastimes. Some of the text's legends have inspired secondary theatre literature such as the eroticism in Gita Govinda. While Indian dance and music theatre traces its origins to the ancient Sama Veda and Natyasastra texts, the Bhagavata Purana and other Krishna-related texts such as Harivamsa and Vishnu Purana have inspired numerous choreographic themes.

Many 'Ras' plays dramatise episodes related in the Rasa Panchadhyayi ("Five chapters of the Celestial Dance"; Canto 10, Chapters 29–33) of the Bhagavatam. The Bhagavatam also encourages theatrical performance as a means to propagate the faith (BP 11.11.23 and 36, 11.27.35 and 44, etc.), and this has led to the emergence of several theatrical forms centred on Krishna all across India. Canto 10 of Bhagavatam is regarded as the inspiration for many classical dance styles such as Kathak, Odissi, Manipuri and Bharatnatyam. Bryant summarizes the influence as follows,

The Bhagavata ranks as an outstanding product of Sanskrit literature. Perhaps more significantly, the Bhagavata has inspired more derivative literature, poetry, drama, dance, theatre and art than any other text in the history of Sanskrit literature, with the possible exception of the Ramayana.

— Edwin Bryant, Krishna: A Sourcebook

== Modern reception ==
In the 20th century, the Bhagavata Purana became widely popular as it spread beyond India, translated into over twenty languages and respected by people worldwide.

=== Bhaktivedanta Swami ===
Bhaktivedanta Swami contributed to the global recognition of the Bhagavata Purana. Between 1962 and 1965, he devoted himself to translating the Bhagavata Purana into English, a departure from earlier works focusing on Caitanya's life and teachings.

== Commentaries and translations ==
=== Commentaries ===
The Bhagavata Purana is one of the most commented texts in Indian literature. Throughout the centuries it attracted a host of commentators from various schools of Krishna worshippers. Over eighty medieval era Bhāṣya (scholarly reviews and commentaries) in Sanskrit alone are known, and many more commentaries exist in various Indian languages. The oldest exegetical commentary presently known is Tantra-Bhagavata from the Pancaratra school.

Early Western Indological scholarship suggested that Sri Vaishnava āchāryas neglected the Bhagavata Purana due to Ramanuja's focus on Vishnu Purana in his Sri Bhasya. But, subsequent historical analysis demonstrates Bhagavat's authority within the Vishishtadvaita tradition. Maqjor Vishishtadvaita scholars utilized and defended the text. Vedanta Desika explicitly upheld the canonical and Vedic authority of Bhagavata in his Śatadūṣaṇī and cited it in the Rahasyatrayasāra. Sudarśana Sūri composed a specific gloss, the Śukapakṣīyā, on the text.

Other commentaries include:

==== Advaita Vedanta commentaries ====
- Bhāvārtha-dīpikā by Śrīdhara Svāmī (15th century CE). According to Ravi M. Gupta, this commentary "exerted extraordinary influence on later Bhāgavata commentaries, and indeed, on Vaiṣṇava traditions more generally." This influence is "particularly true of the Caitanya Vaiṣṇava commentaries by Sanātana Gosvāmi, Jīva Gosvāmī, Viśvanātha Cakravartī, and others."
- Amṛta-taraṅginī by Lakṣmīdhara (15th century CE)
- A commentary by Madhusūdana Sarasvatī (c. 1540–1640) on the first verse of the Bhāgavata Purāṇa.

==== Acintya-bhedābheda Commentaries ====
- Caitanya-mata-mañjuṣā – Śrīnātha Cakravartī
- Bṛhad-vaiṣṇava-toṣiṇī – Sanātana Gosvāmī
- Laghu-Vaiṣṇava-toṣiṇī – Jīva Gosvāmī
- Krama-sandarbha – Jīva Gosvāmī
- Bṛhat-krama-sandarbha – Jīva Gosvāmī (attributed)
- Ṣaṭ-sandarbhas by Jīva Gosvāmī (16th century CE)
- Sārārtha-darśinī – Viśvanātha Cakravartī (17th century CE) – elaborate commentary
- Vaiṣṇavānandinī – Baladeva Vidyābhūṣaṇa
- Dīpika-dīpanī – Rādhāramaṇa Gosvāmī
- Gauḍīya-bhāṣya – Bhaktisiddhanta Saraswati (20th century CE) – elaborate commentary
- Bhaktivedānta Purports – A.C. Bhaktivedanta Swami Prabhupada (20th century CE) – elaborate commentary

==== Dvaita commentaries ====
- Bhāgavata Tātparya Nirṇaya by Madhvacharya (13th century CE)
- Pada-ratnavali by Vijayadhvaja Tīrtha (15th century CE) – elaborate commentary
- Bhagvata Tatparya Nirnaya Tippani by Yadupati Acharya (16th century)
- Duraghatabhavadipa by Satyabhinava Tirtha (17th century CE)
- Bhaghavata-Sarodhara by Adavi Jayatirthacharya (18th century CE)
- Srimadbhagavata Tippani by Satyadharma Tirtha (18th century CE)

==== Dvaitādvaita Commentaries ====
- Siddhānta pradīpikā – Śuka-sudhī (Early 19th Century)

==== Suddhādvaita Commentaries ====
- Subodhinī by Vallabha (incomplete — present on the First, Second, Third, Tenth Cantos and partially on the Eleventh Canto.
- Bhāgavatārtha-prakaraṇa by Vallabha
- Daśama-skandha anukramaṇikā by Vallabha
- Ṭippaṇī – Gosvāmī Viṭṭhalanātha
- Subodhinī-prakāśa – Gosvāmī Puruṣhottama
- Bāla-prabodhinī – Gosvāmī Giridharalāla
- Viśuddha-rasa-dīpikā – Kiśorī Prasāda

==== Viśiṣṭādvaita Commentaries ====
- Śuka pakṣīyā – Sudarśana sūri (alias Vyāsa Bhaṭṭa)
- Bhāgavata-candrikā – Vīrarāghava (14th century CE) – elaborate commentary
- Bhakta-rañjanī – Bhagavat prasāda

==== Others ====
- Hanumad-bhāṣya
- Vāsanā-bhāṣya
- Sambandhokti
- Vidvat-kāmadhenu
- Paramahaṁsa-priyā
- Śuka-hṛdaya
- Muktā-phala and Hari-līlāmṛta by Vopadeva
- Bhakti-ratnāvali by Viṣṇupurī
- Bhakti-ratnākara by Srimanta Sankardev
- Ekanathi Bhagavata by Saint Eknath of Paithan (16th century CE, on the 11th Canto in the vernacular language of the Indian state of Maharashtra)
- Narayaneeyam by Melpathur Bhattathiri of Kerala (1586, a condensed Srimad Bhagavatam)
- Bhāvārtha-dīpikā-prakāśa – Vaṁśīdhara
- Anvitārtha prakāśikā – Gaṅgāsahāya
- Bhagavata-Purana by S.S. Shulba (2017, original Sanskrit); other Sanskrit manuscripts are available
- A study of the Bhagavata Purana or Esoteric Hinduism by P.N. Sinha (1901)

=== Translations ===
The Bhagavata has been rendered into various Indian and non-Indian languages. A version of it is available in almost every Indian language, with forty translations alone in the Bengali language. From the eighteenth century onwards, the text became the subject of scholarly interest and Victorian disapproval, with the publication of a French translation followed by an English one. The following is a partial list of translations:

==== Assamese ====
- Bhagavata of Sankara (1449–1568 CE, primary theological source for Mahapurushiya Dharma in the Indian state of Assam)
- Katha Bhagavata by Bhattadeva (Prose translation 16th century CE)

==== Bengali ====
- Śrī Kṛṣṇa-vijaya by Maladhara Basu, a translation of the 10th Canto and a bit from others
- Kṛṣṇa-prema-taraṅginī by Śrī Raghunātha Bhāgavatācārya (15th Century CE)

==== Gurmukhi ====
10th Book of Bhagvad Purana under title Krishna Avtar written by Guru Gobind Singh in Dasam Granth

==== Hindi ====
- Bhagavata Mahapurana published by Gita Press (2017)

==== Kannada ====
- Bhagavata Padaratnavali with kannada translation by Dr. Vyasanakere Prabhanjanachar
- Bhagavata Saroddhara by VishnuTeertharu (Adavi JayatirthaCharyaru) with Kannada translation by Dr. Vyasanakere Prabhanjanachar
- Bhagavata Mahatmya in PadmaPurana in Kannada Pravachana by Dr. Vyasanakere Prabhanjanachar
- Bhagavata Mahapurana by Vidwan Motaganahalli Ramashesha Sastri (foreword by historian S. Srikanta Sastri)

Odia

- Odia Bhagabata by Jagannatha Dasa (15th Century CE)

==== Telugu ====
- Mahābhāgavatamu by the poet Bammera Pōtana (15th century CE).

==== English ====
- A prose English translation of Shrimadbhagabatam by M.N. Dutt (1895, unabridged)
- Bhagavata Purana by Motilal Banarsidass Publishers (1950, unabridged)
- The Śrīmad Bhāgavatam by A. C. Bhaktivedanta Swami Prabhupada (1970–77, includes transliterations, synonyms, and purports)
- The Srimad Bhagavatam by J.M. Sanyal (1970, abridged)
- The Bhagavata Purana by Ganesh Vasudeo Tagare (1976, unabridged)
- Srimad Bhagavata by Swami Tapasyananda (1980, unabridged)
- A Translation by B.P. Yati Maharaj of Mayapur Sri Chaitanya Math
- Reading from Bhagabata by Gananath Das which has been translated from Odia Bhagabata
- Bhagavata Mahapurana by C.L. Goswami and M.A. Shastri (2006, unabridged, Gita Press)
- Śrīmad Bhāgavatam with the Sārārtha-darśinī commentary of Viśvanātha Cakravartī by Swami Bhānu (2010)
- Srimad Bhagavata Purana by Anand Aadhar (2012)
- The Bhagavata Purana by Bibek Debroy (2019, unabridged)

==== English (partial translations and paraphrases) ====
- Kṛṣṇa: The Supreme Personality of Godhead by A. C. Bhaktivedanta Swami Prabhupada (part translation, condensed version: summary study and paraphrase of Canto 10)
- Vallabhacarya on the Love Games of Krishna by James D. Redington (English translation of Vallabha's commentary on the Rāsa-Panchyādhyāyi)
- The Bhagavata Purana; Book X by Nandini Nopani and P. Lal (1997)
- Krishna: The Beautiful Legend of God: Srimad Bhagavata Purana Book X by Edwin F. Bryant (2004)
- The Wisdom of God: Srimat Bhagavatam by Swami Prabhavananda (part translation, part summary and paraphrase)
- The Uddhava Gita by Swami Ambikananda Saraswati (2000, prose translation of Canto 11)
- Bhagavata Purana by Ramesh Menon (2007, a 'retelling' based on other translations)
- Śrīmad Bhāgavatam: A Symphony of Commentaries on the Tenth Canto in six volumes (covering chapters 1-33) by Gaurapada Dāsa, M.A. (translator) & Matsya Avatāra Dāsa (editor) (2016–2018)
- Bhakti Yoga: Tales and Teachings from the Bhagavata Purana by Edwin F. Bryant (2017, selections of verses and commentary)
- Śrīmad Bhāgavatam with the Krama-sandarbha commentary of Jīva Gosvāmī by Swami Bhānu (2019)
- Bṛhad-vaiṣṇnava-toṣaṇī (Canto 10) of Sanātana Gosvāmī by Swami Bhānu (2020)
- Laghu-vaiṣṇava-toṣaṇī (Canto 10) of Jīva Gosvāmī by Swami Bhānu (2020)
- Śrīmad Bhāgavatam with the Vaiṣṇavānandinī commentary (Cantos 1 & 10) of Baladeva Vidyābhūṣaṇa by Swami Bhānu (2022–23)

==== French ====
- Bagavadam ou Bhagavata Purana by Maridas Poullé (1769)
- Le Bhagavata Purana by Eugene Burnouf (1840)

== See also ==
- Srimad Bhagavata Book 1
- Srimad Bhagavata Book 2
- Srimad Bhagavata Book 3
- Bhagavan
- Vishnu
- Bhakti
- Narayana
- Krishna
- Nava rasas
- Puranas
- Smriti
- Vedanta
