= Ashvins =

Vedic twin gods of medicine

- Gods of Health and Medicine
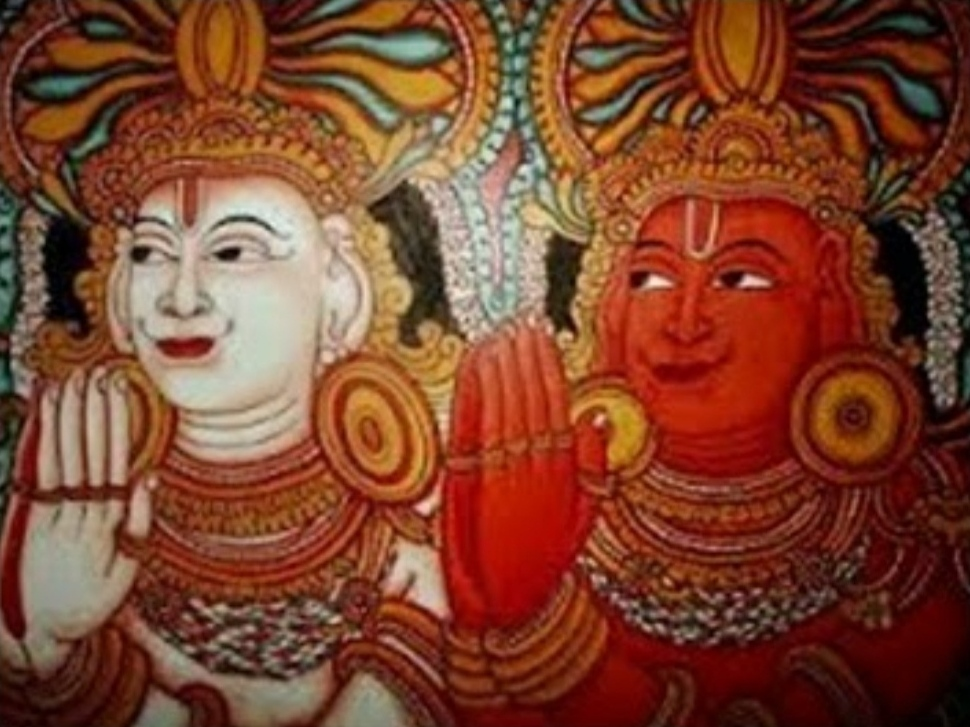
- Other names: Ashvini Kumaras, Ashvinau, Nasatya, Dasra
- Devanagari: अश्विन्
- Affiliation: Deva
- Symbol: Horse
- Mount: Chariot pulled by horses
- Texts: Rigveda, Mahabharata, Puranas

Genealogy
- Parents: Surya (father); Sanjna (mother)
- Siblings: Revanta, Yami, Yama, Shraddhadeva Manu, Shani, Karna, Tapati and Savarni Manu
- Consort: Sūryā
- Children: Nakula; Sahadeva; (sons)

Equivalents
- Greek: Dioskuri
- Baltic: Ašvieniai, Dieva Dēli

The Ashvins (Sanskrit: अश्विन्, lit. 'horse possessors', IAST: Aśvin), also known as the Ashvini Kumaras and Asvinau, are Vedic twin gods, namely Nāsatya (Sanskrit: नासत्य, lit. 'ever true') and Dasra (Sanskrit: दस्र, lit. 'enlightened giving'). They are associated with medicine, health, healing, sciences, and the twilight. In the Rigveda, they are described as youthful divine twin horsemen, travelling in a chariot drawn by horses that are never weary, and portrayed as guardian deities that safeguard and rescue people by aiding them in various situations.

There are varying accounts, but Ashvins are generally mentioned as the sons of the sun god Surya and his wife Sanjna. In the epic Mahabharata, the Pandava twins Nakula and Sahadeva were the children of the Ashvins.

== Etymology and epithets ==
The Sanskrit name Aśvín (अश्विन्) derives from the Indo-Iranian stem *Haćwa- (cf. Avestan aspā), itself from the Indo-European word for the horse, *h_{1}éḱwos, from which also descends the Lithuanian name Ašvieniai.

In the Rigveda, the Ashvins are always referred to in the dual, without individual names, although Vedic texts differentiate between the two Ashvins: "one of you is respected as the victorious lord of Sumakha, and the other as the fortunate son of heaven" (RV 1.181.4). They are called several times divó nápātā, that is 'grandsons of Dyaús (the sky-god)'. This formula is comparable with the Lithuanian Dievo sūneliai, 'sons of Dievas (the sky-god'), attached to the Ašvieniai; the Latvian Dieva Dēli, the 'sons of Dievs (the sky-god)'; and the Greek Diós-kouroi, the 'boys of Zeus', designating Castor and Pollux.

The twin gods are also referred to as Nā́satyā (possibly 'saviours'; a derivative of nasatí, 'safe return home'), a name that appears 99 times in the Rigveda. The epithet probably derives from the Proto-Indo-European root *nes- ('to return home [safely]'), with cognates in the Avestan Nā̊ŋhaiθya, the name of a demon of discord, and also in the Greek hero Nestor and in the Gothic verb nasjan ('save, heal').

In the later Mahabharata, the Ashvins are often called the Nasatyas or Dasras. Sometimes one of them is referred to as Nasatya and one as Dasra.

== Origin and equivalents ==
The Ashvins are an instance of the Indo-European divine horse twins. Reflexes in other Indo-European religions include the Lithuanian Ašvieniai, the Latvian Dieva Dēli, the Greek Castor and Pollux; and possibly the English Hengist and Horsa, and the Welsh Bran and Manawydan. The first mention of the Nasatya twins is from a Mitanni treaty (c.1350 BCE), between Suppiluliuma and Shattiwaza, respectively kings of the Hittites and the Mitanni.

== Literature and legends ==
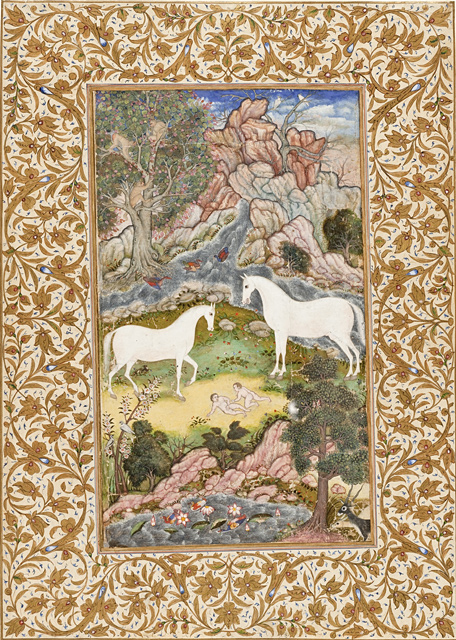
Birth of the Ashvins, a folio from the text Harivamsha

=== Vedic texts ===
The Ashvins are mentioned 398 times in the Rigveda, with more than 50 hymns specifically dedicated to them: 1.3, 1.22, 1.34, 1.46–47, 1.112, 1.116–120, 1.157–158, 1.180–184, 2.20, 3.58, 4.43–45, 5.73–78, 6.62–63, 7.67–74, 8.5, 8.8–10, 8.22, 8.26, 8.35, 8.57, 8.73, 8.85–87, 10.24, 10.39–41, 10.143.

Your chariot, o Aśvins, swifter than mind, drawn by good horses, comes to the clans.

By which (chariot) you go to the home of the good ritual performer, by that, o men, travel your course to us. You free Atri, the seer of the five peoples, from narrow straits, from the earth cleft along with his band, o men—confounding the wiles of the merciless Dasyu, driving them out, one after another, o bulls.

O Aśvins—you men, you bulls—by the wondrous powers you draw back together the seer Rebha, who bobbed away in the waters, like a horse hidden by those of evil ways. Your ancient deeds do not grow old.

— 1.117.2–4, in The Rigveda, translated by Stephanie W. Jamison (2014)

According to the text, the Ashvins were born after the sun god Vivasvat and his wife Saranyu (Sanjna) engaged in love making in the form of a stallion and a mare respectively. The Ashvins are also called "divó nápātā", which is variously translated as either "sons" or "grandsons" of Dyaush. At one mention, the Indus (Sindhu) River is stated to be their mother. Ashvins were the close companions of the Vedic mother goddess Ushas (dawn) and sometimes they are even mentioned as her sons. The marriage of the Ashvin brothers is narrated in the Sukta 117 of Rigveda. According to the legend, the sun god, Surya-Savitra, had a daughter named Sūryā (with a long ā) and arranged a horse-race to choose her bridegroom. The Ashvins won the race and thus, both of them married Suryā. (Note: Contradictory to this, some chapters of Rigveda suggest that Sūryā's bridegroom was the god Soma and the Ashvins were his friends.) Pushan is also stated to have chosen the Ashvins to be his fathers.

The Ashvins are depicted as the helpers of mortals in various suktas of Rigveda. The sukta 112 describes that when the sage Dirghashravas prayed to Ashvins for rain, the twins poured sweet water from the sky. According to sukta 16, they also helped the sage Gotama, who was lost in a desert and begged for water. It is described that the gods dug a water well and helped the sage. According to another account, Rebha was bound, stabbed, and cast into the waters for nine days and ten nights before being saved by the twins. He was explicitly described as "dead" when the twins "raised (him) up" to save him (RV 10.39.9). Similarly, Bhujyu was saved after his father or evil companions abandoned him at sea when the twins brought him home from the dead ancestors (RV, 1.119.4).

The Ashvins also raised Vandana, rescued Atri from a fissure in the earth and its heat, found Vishnapu and returned him to his father, restored the youth of Kali, brought Kamadyū as a wife for Vimada, gave a son to Vadhrimatī (whose husband was a steer), restored the eyesight of Rijrashva, replaced the foot of Vishpala with a metal one, made the cow Śayu give milk, gave a horse to Pedu, and put a horse's head on Dadhyañc. According to the Shatapatha Brahmana, Ashvins once tried to seduce Sukanya, the daughter of king Saryati and wife of an old sage named Chyavana. However, she refused and claimed that the twins were imperfect and told them to restore the youth of Chyavana. Desperate to know the reason for her words, they fulfilled her condition and the sage finally revealed that Ashvins were excluded from a yajna (fire sacrifice) performed by the gods, and thus, they were incomplete. Ashvins went to the sacrifice but the gods don't accept, claiming that the Ashvins were spending too much time with the mortals. After many attempts of explanation, they were finally accepted. The Ashvins are sometimes presented as fierce deities. In the sukta 117, they even destroyed an asura Vishvaka as well as his dynasty.

=== Post-Vedic text ===
In the post-Vedic texts of Hinduism, the Ashvins remain significant, and in these texts, one of them is referred as Nasatya and the other one is known as Darsa. Many of their legends are rewritten in various texts like the epic Mahabharata, Harivamsha, and the Puranas.

According to these texts, Sanjna, daughter of Vishvakarma, was married to Surya, but she was unable to bear his heat and decided to abandon him. She ran away and roamed in the forest of northern Kuru kingdom in the form of a mare. The Vishnu Purana adds that she performed austerities in the forest to gain control over Surya's heat. After Surya discovered Sanjna's disappearance, he located her and had sex with her in the form of a stallion. Sanjna gave birth to the twins. Rarely, in some Puranas, Ashvins are mentioned as the sons (creation) of the god Brahma.

These texts also elaborate the story of Chyavana, which was first narrated in Brahmanas. In this version, Sukanya—the beautiful daughter of the king Saryati—accidentally blinded the old Chyavana, who was performing austerities. She married him to save her kingdom from his wrath and served him dutifully. While traveling on their chariot, the Ashvins saw Sukanya in a forest and tried to seduce her. They asked her to choose one of them as her new husband, but she refused and remained faithful to Chyavana. The twins were impressed by her chastity and asked her to wish anything. Upon their request, she told them to restore the youth and sight of Chyavana. Ashvins agreed but they had a condition. After curing Chyavana, they would also take similar form and she would have to identify Chyavana. Sukanya showed her consent after getting permission from her husband. Ashvins took Chyavana into a lake and cured him. When a young Chyavana emerged from the lake, Ashvins also took forms similar to him and Sukanya successfully identified her husband.

The Mahabharata also narrates about the birth of Nakula and Sahadeva, who were the "spiritual sons" of the Ashvins. According to the epic, king Pandu was unable to have sex with his wives due to a curse and didn't have any heir. So, he advised his wives, Kunti and Madri, to invoke various gods and ask for sons. Madri invoked the Ashvins Nasatya and Darsa who blessed her with Nakula and Sahadeva respectively.

== Associations ==
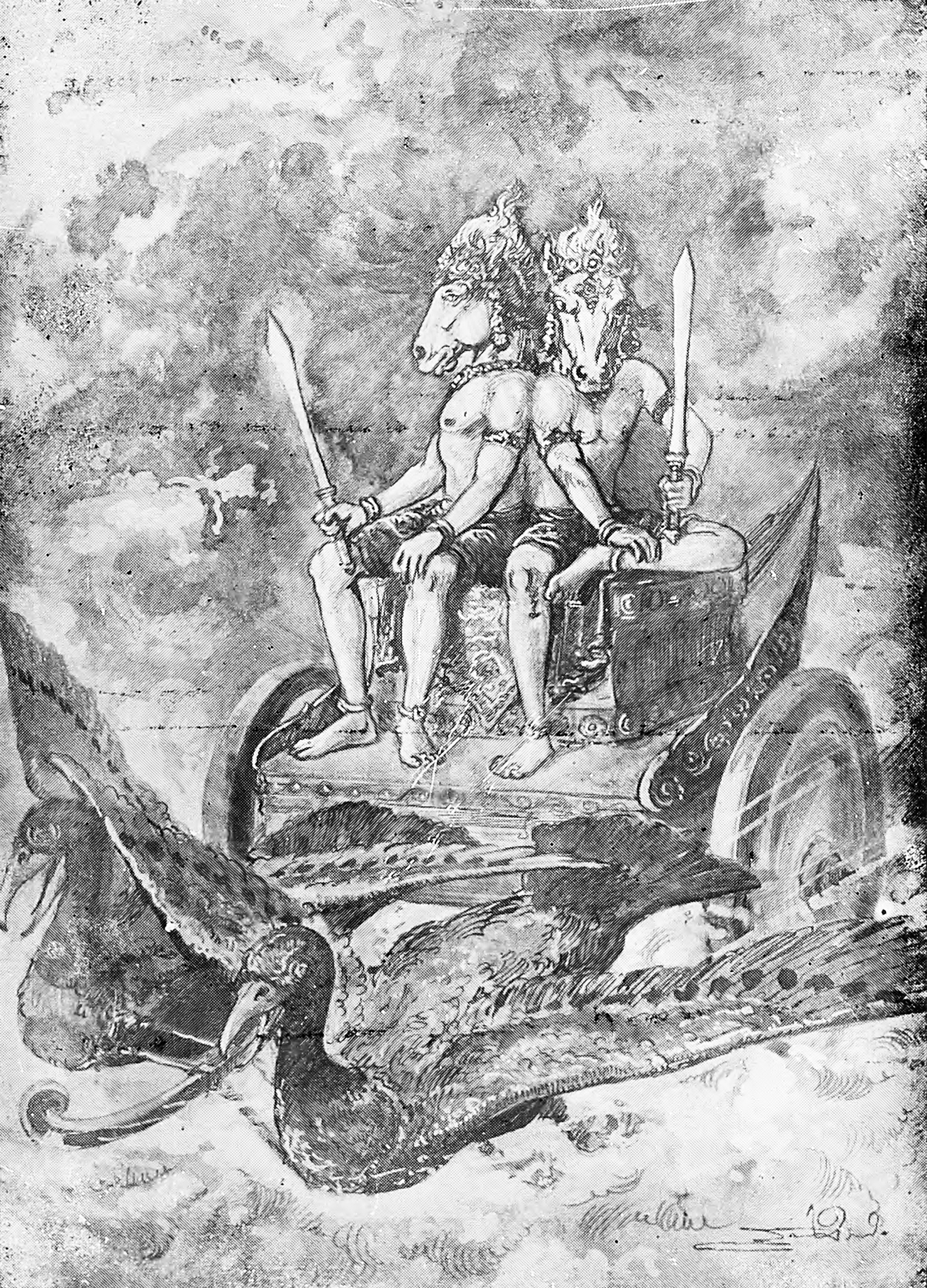
Thai depiction of the Horse-faced Ashvins on a chariot (1959)

The Ashvins are often associated with rescuing mortals and bringing them back to life. (Note: See #Vedic texts section of Literature and legends) The Rigveda also describes the Ashvins as "bringing light": they gave "light-bringing help" (svàrvatīr…ūtī́r, 1.119.8) to Bhujyu, and "raised (Rebha) up to see the sun" (úd…aírayataṃ svàr dṛśé, 1.112.5).

The Ashvins are associated with honey, which was likely offered to them in a sacrifice. They are the chief deities in the Pravargya rite, in which they are offered hot milk. They are also associated with the morning pressing of Soma, because they are dual deities, along with Indra-Vāyu and Mitra-Varuṇa. They also are the last deities to receive Soma in the Atirātra, or Overnight Soma Ritual.

The Ashvins are invoked at dawn, the time of their principal sacrifice, and have a close connection with the dawn goddess, Uṣas: she is bidden to awaken them (8.9.17), they follow her in their chariot (8.5.2), she is born when they hitch their steeds (10.39.12), and their chariot is once said to arrive before her (1.34.10). They are consequently associated with the "return from darkness": the twins are called "darkness slayers" (tamohánā, 3.39.3), they are invoked with the formula "you who have made light for mankind" (yā́v...jyótir jánāya cakráthuḥ, 1.92.17), and their horses and chariot are described as "uncovering the covered darkness" (aporṇuvántas táma ā́ párīvṛtam, 4.45.2).

The chariot of the Ashvins is repeatedly mentioned in the Rigveda. Their chariot has three chariot-boxes, three wheels, three turnings, and three wheel rims. The emphasis on the number 3 is symbolized in the sacrifice with its three soma pressings. The chariot is pulled by bulls, buffaloes, horses, birds, geese, and falcons. The chariot allows the Ashvins to be quick and mobile and travel to a number of places, which is necessary to fulfill their role of rescuing people. Sūryā, the daughter of the Sun, is sometimes mentioned as the wife of the Ashvins, and she rides with them in their chariot.

It is also believed that the Ashvins were the first one to prepare the chayavanprasham formulation for Sage Chyavana believed in local tradition to be located at his ashram on Dhosi Hill near Narnaul, Haryana, India, the etymology behind the modern rendering of chyavanprash.

== See also ==
- Ašvieniai, counterparts in Lithuanian mythology
