= Revanta =

Hindu deity

- The divine master of horses
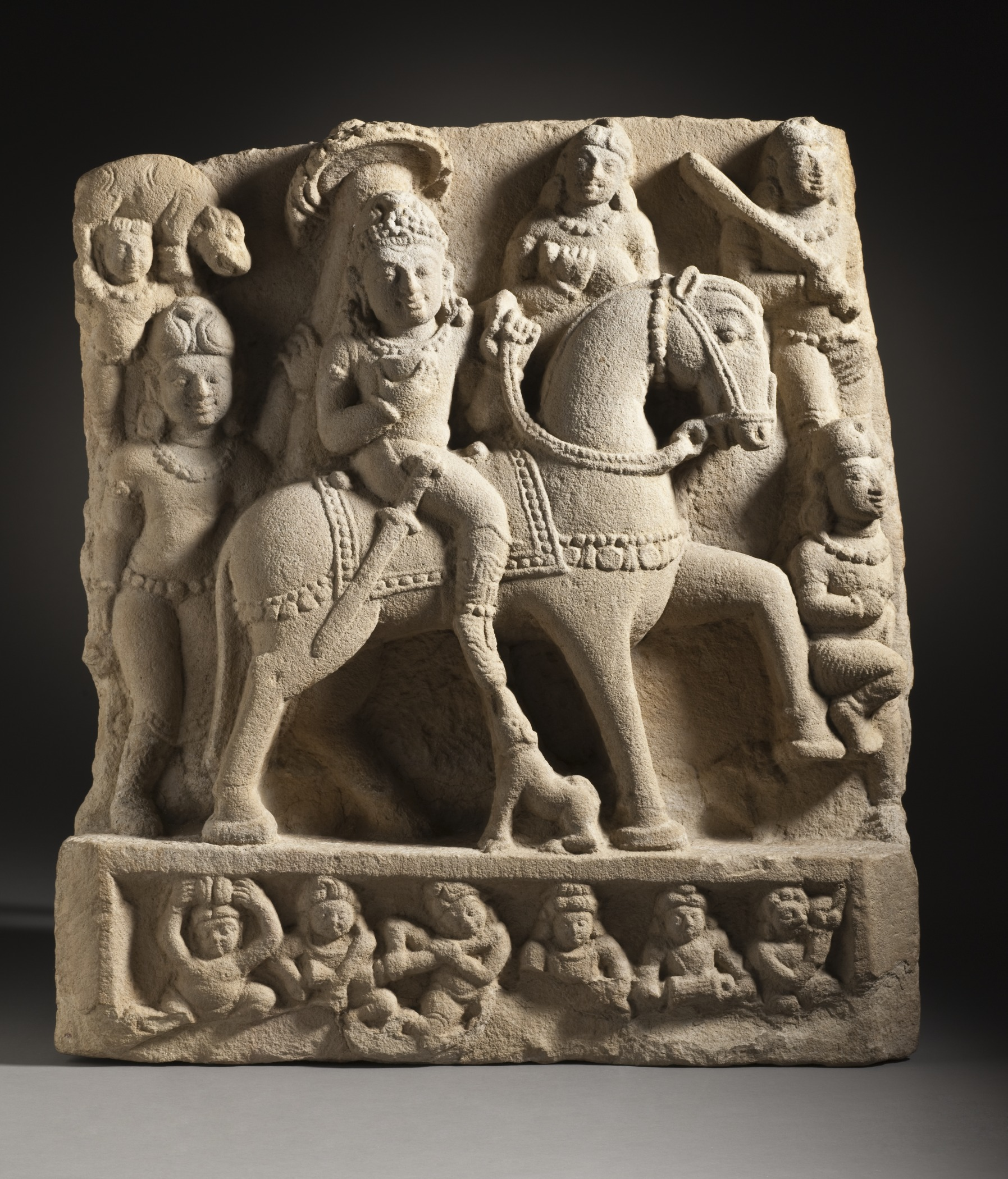
- 7th century statue of Revanta from Sarnath, Eastern Uttar Pradesh
- Affiliation: Guhyakas
- Abode: Himalaya
- Weapon: Sword
- Mount: Horse

Genealogy
- Parents: Surya (father); Saranyu (mother)
- Siblings: Ashvins, Yamaraja, Yami, Shani, Tapati and Shraddhadeva Manu

Revanta or Raivata (Sanskrit: रेवन्त; lit. 'brilliant') is a minor Hindu deity. According to the Rig-Veda, Revanta is the youngest son of the sun-god Surya, and his wife Saranyu.

Revanta is chief of the Guhyakas, supernatural beings – like the Yakshas – who are believed to live as forest dwellers in the Himalayas.

Images and sculptures of Revanta often show him as a huntsman on a horse, with a bow and arrow. The worship of Revanta was especially common in medieval Eastern India (Bihar and Bengal) with many archaeological finds indicating the existence of a cult dedicated to him that began in the 6th century A.D.

== Legends ==
The tale of Revanta's birth is narrated in scriptures like the Vishnu Purana and the Markandeya Purana. Once, Sanjna (Saranyu), the daughter of celestial architect Vishvakarma and wife of Surya, unable to take the fervour of the Sun-god, repaired to the forests to engage in devout austerities in the form of a mare. She placed her shadow Chhaya, who looked just like Sanjna in her position as Surya's wife. When Surya realised that Chhaya was not the real Sanjna, he searched for Sanjna and finally found her in the forests of Uttar Kuru. There, Surya approached Sanjna disguised as a horse. Their union produced the twin-Ashvins and Revanta. In the Kurma Purana, the Linga Purana, the Agni Purana and the Matsya Purana, the mother of Revanta is named Ratri (Rajni), another wife of Surya. While in another chapter of the Markandeya Purana, he is son of Chhaya and his brothers are the Saturn-god Shani, Tapati and Savarni Manu.

The Markandeya Purana further adds he was assigned the duty as chief of Guhyakas by Surya and to protect mortals "amid the terrors of forests and other lonely places, of great conflagration, of enemies and robbers." Sometimes, Revanta is depicted as combating robbers in reliefs.

Another tale from the Devi Bhagavata Purana has a passing reference to Revanta. Once when Revanta – riding on the seven headed horse Uchaishravas – went to Vishnu's abode, Vishnu's wife Lakshmi was mesmerized with the horse (her brother, as they were both born from the Ocean of Milk) and ignored a question asked by Vishnu. Thus, she was cursed by her husband to become a mare.

== Iconography ==
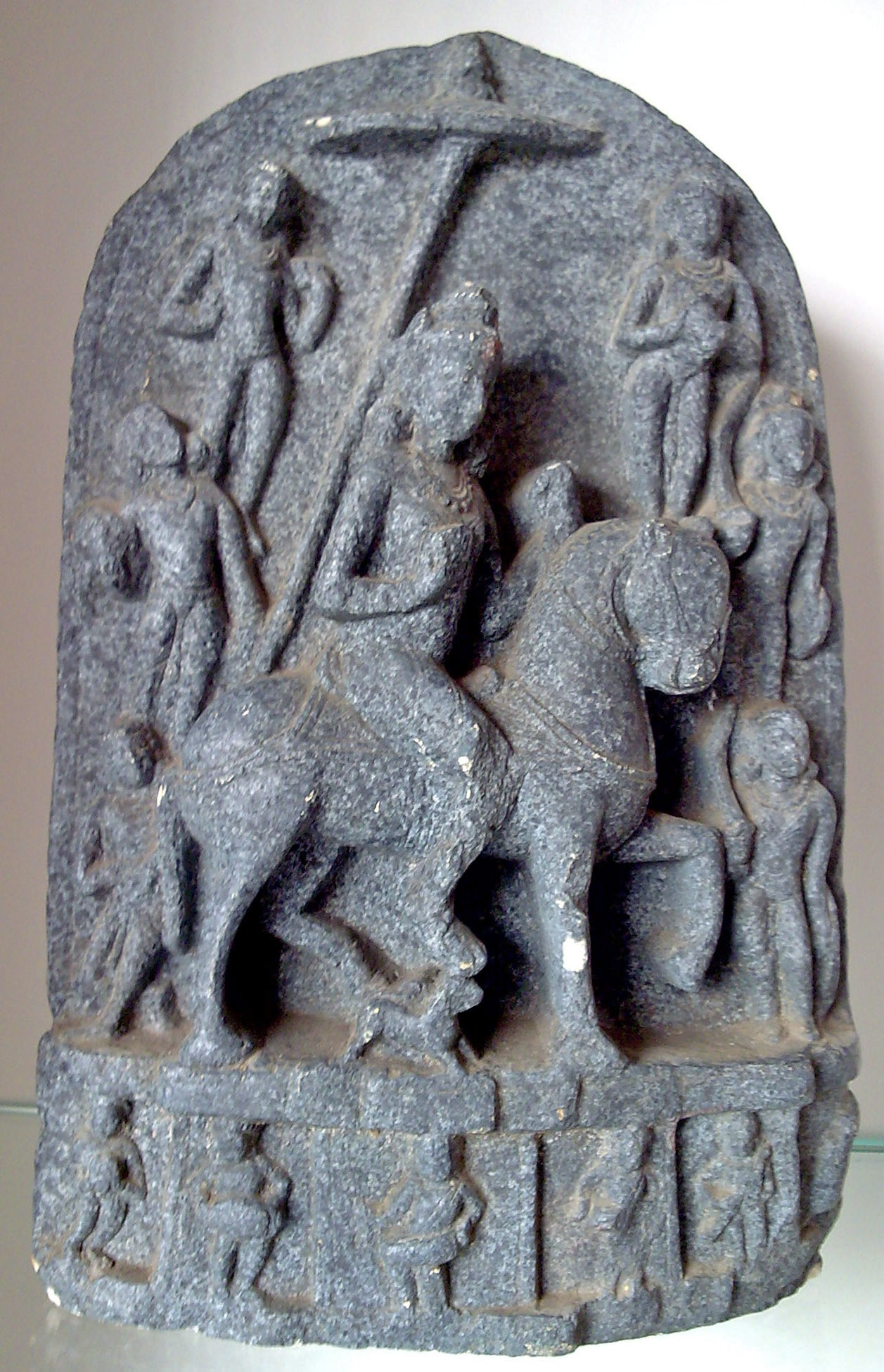
11th century statue of Revanta from Bengal

The Markandeya Purana describes Revanta as "holding a sword and bow, clad in an armour, riding on horseback, and carrying arrows and a quiver". The Kalika Purana describes him carrying a sword in right hand and a whip in his left, seated on a white horse. Thus he is called Haya-Vahana, one who rides a horse. Varahamihira describes him as accompanied by attendants for hunting.

In sculpture, Revanta is often depicted with the Guhyakas, whose chief he is, in scenes of hunting. Apart from the attributes described in texts like the sword, bow; he sometimes also carries a cup of wine in his hand. Revanta is often depicted wearing long boots reaching up to the calves, unlike other Hindu divinities – except Surya – who are depicted barefoot. Revanta is depicted seated on a horse and accompanied by a hunting dog. Revanta's attendants are depicted with various hunting weapons like lances and swords. Some of them are shown blowing a conch or beaming drums or holding an umbrella over the head of their lord, the umbrella being the symbol of royalty. Also, some of them are depicted as flying or holding wine or water jars. Sometimes, an attendant carries a dead boar in his shoulder or the dog chasing a boar.

== Worship ==
Revanta was worshipped as guardian deity of warriors and horses, protector from the dangers of forests and the patron god of hunting. The worship of Revanta is closely associated with Saura, the sect of Surya. Often, scriptures like the Vishnudharmottara Purana and the Kalika Purana recommend worship of Revanta alongside Surya or according to the rituals of Sun worship. The Shabha-kalpa-druma records Revanta's worship after Surya's, in the Hindu month of Ashvin by warriors. Nakula, the fourth Pandava, is believed to have written the Ashvashastram on horses. He suggests worship of Raivata to protect horses from ghosts.

The worship of Revanta was popular in the early-medieval period, particularly in Rajasthan. Revanta is mostly depicted in Vaishnava and Surya temples. There is a stone inscription that talks about a temple to Revanta, as the principal deity, in Vikranapur (modern Kotgaph, Madhya Pradesh) built by the Kalachuri king Ratnadeva II.
