= Yamuna in Hinduism =

River Yamuna in Hindu texts and beliefs

Yamuna
- Personification of the Yamuna river
- Member of Ashtabharya
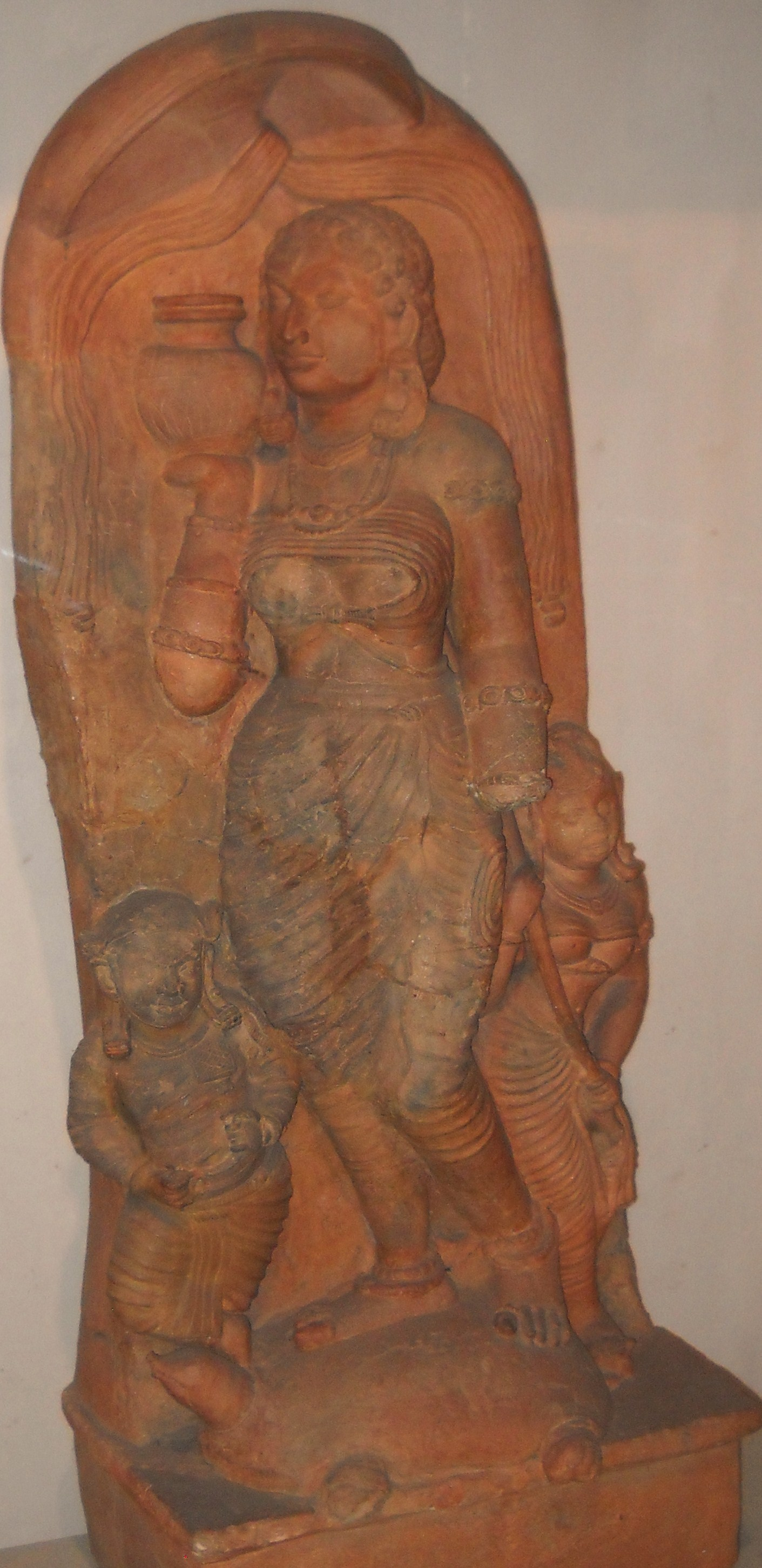
- 5th century terracotta sculpture of Yamuna with attendants
- Devanagari: यमुना
- Sanskrit transliteration: Yamunā
- Affiliation: Devi, River goddess, Ashtabharya
- Abode: Suryaloka, Yamunotri
- Mantra: Om Yamunaya Namaha; Yamunashtaka
- Symbols: Lotus
- Mount: Tortoise
- Festivals: Yamuna Jayanti, Surya Shashti, Bhai Dooj

Genealogy
- Parents: Surya (father); Sanjna (mother)
- Siblings: Yama, Shani, Tapati, Revanta, Ashvins and Vaivasvata Manu
- Consort: Krishna
- Children: 10 children including Shruta

Yamuna is a sacred river in Hinduism and the main tributary of the Ganges River. The river is also worshipped as a Hindu goddess called Yamuna. Yamuna is known as Yami in early texts, while in later literature she is called Kalindi. In Hindu scriptures, she is the daughter of Surya, the sun god, and Sanjna, the cloud goddess. She is also the twin sister of Yama, god of death. She is associated with the deity Krishna as one of his eight principal consorts, called the Ashtabharya. Yamuna plays an important role in Krishna's early life as a river. According to Hindu scriptures, bathing in or drinking Yamuna's waters removes sin.

== Iconography ==
Yamuna's iconographic depiction is seen on temple doorjambs, paired with that of Ganga (the goddess of the Ganges), since the Gupta era. The Agni Purana describes Yamuna as black in complexion, standing on her mount, the tortoise, and holding a water pot in her hand. In an ancient painting she is shown as a beautiful maiden standing on the banks of the river.

== Family and names ==
In the Puranic literature, Yamuna is described as the daughter of the sun god Surya (though some say that she was the daughter of Brahma) and his wife Saranyu (Sanjna in later literature), the goddess of the clouds, and the twin sister of Yama, the god of death. Her other brothers include Vaivasvata Manu, the first man, the twin Ashvins, or divine physicians, and the planet Saturn (Shani). She is described as Surya's favourite child. As the daughter of Surya, she is also called as Suryatanaya, Suryaja, and Ravinandini.

A tale explains her name Yamuna: Sanjna was unable to bear her husband, the sun's heat, and its light and closed her eyes in his presence. Surya felt insulted and said that their son will be known as Yama ("restraint"), due to the restraint she showed. Thereafter, Sanjna tried her best to keep her eyes open, however she flickered them angering Surya again who proclaimed that her daughter would be Yamuna. Since Sanjna had tried to keep the eyes open, Yamuna was blessed that she would be worshipped as a goddess and remembered throughout time.

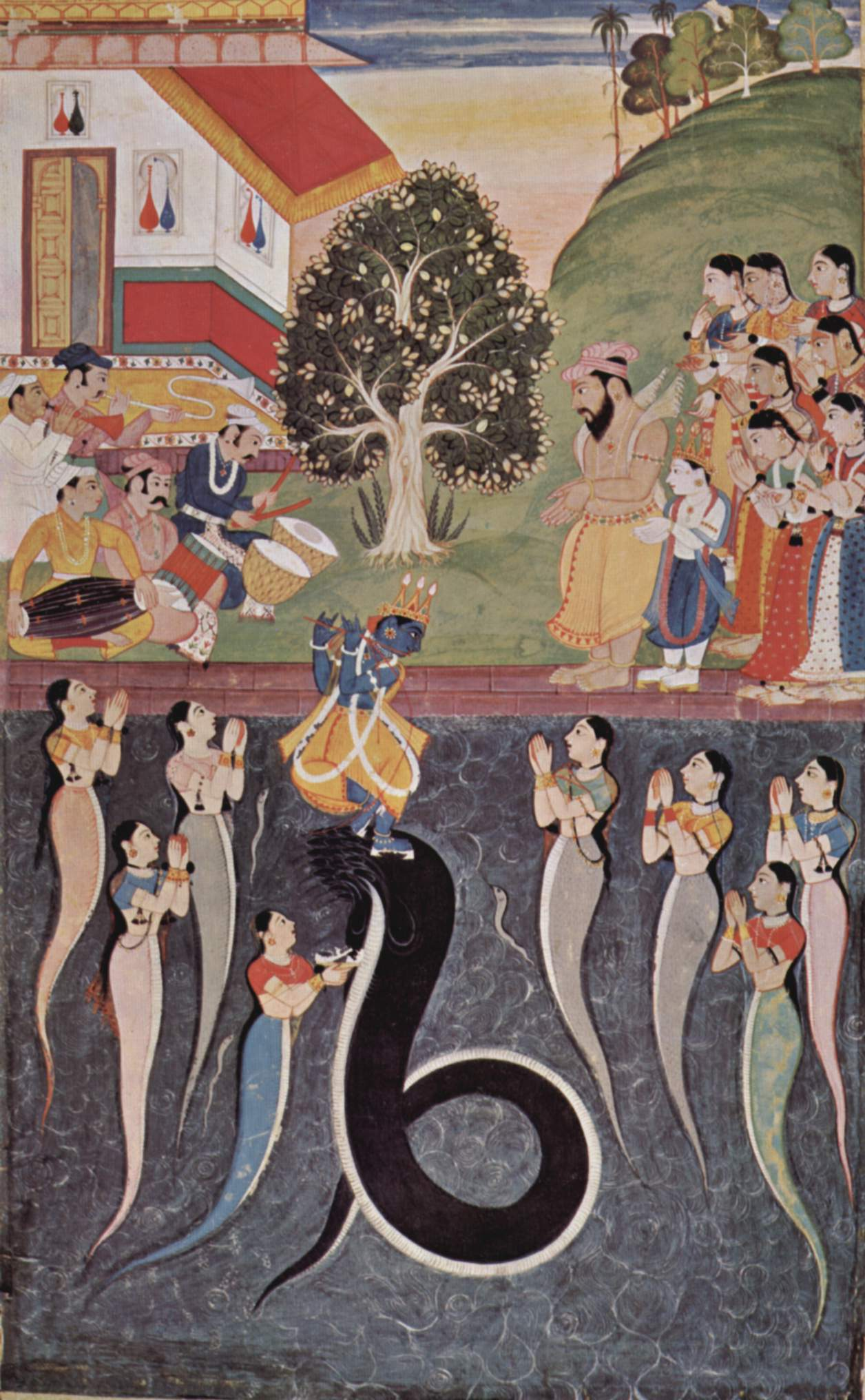
Krishna defeats Kaliya, dwelling in the Yamuna.

The name Kalindi may be derived from her association with Yama, the god of death and darkness as Kala. Another source suggests that she derives the name Kalindi from her "earthly" source, the mountain Kalinda. Some legends also explain Yamuna's darkness and thus her name Kalindi. The Vamana Purana narrates the tale how the originally clear waters turned black. Distraught by the death of his wife Sati, Shiva wandered the whole universe. Ever thinking of Sati, Shiva jumped into Yamuna to overcome the sorrow and memories of Sati, turning her waters into black by his sorrow and unfulfilled desire. Another legend describes that Krishna defeated and banished the serpent Kaliya in the Yamuna. While the dark serpent entered the waters, the river became dark.

== Association with Yama ==
According to O'Flaherty, Yami is considered to be the twin sister of Yama in Vedic beliefs. Yama and Yami are a divine pair of creator deities. While Yama is depicted as the Lord of Death, Yami is said to be the Lady of Life.

Yami also addresses a hymn to Yama in the Rig Veda, describing various drinks offered to dying sacrificers in the after-life. The Brahmana text Taittiriya Samhita says that Yama is Agni (fire) and Yami is the earth. Yami is thus further described as an association with the earth, relating her to the goddess of graveyards and sorrow, Nirriti, another partner of Yama in the Vedas. In the Brahmanas; however retains the central role of being Yama's twin sister in the Samhita texts. In the Purushamedha rite in the Shatapatha Brahmana, a mother of twins is sacrificed to Yami, while twins are offered in the Taittiriya Brahmana.

In the dialogue hymn between Yama and Yamī (RV 10.10), as the first two humans, Yamī tries to convince her twin brother Yama to have sex with her. Yamī makes a variety of arguments, including continuing the mortal line, that Tvashtar created them as a couple in the womb, and that Dyaush and Prithvi are famous for their incest. Yama argues that their ancestors, "the Gandharva in the waters and the watery maiden," as a reason not to commit incest, that Mitra-Varuna are strict in their ordinances, and that they have spies everywhere. By the end of the hymn, Yamī becomes frustrated but Yama remains firm in his stance. However, by RV 10.13.4, Yama is stated to have chosen to leave offspring, but Yamī is not mentioned.

The Brahmana text Maitrayani Samhita narrates: Yami grieved instantly the death of Yama, the first mortal to die. As there was continuously daytime at the start of creation, Yami was unable to understand the lapse of time since Yama's death. The gods created night separating two days so that Yami understood that time was passing and slowly recovered from her sorrow. The concept of the pair of twins with the festival of Bhau-beej, celebrated by a brother and a sister, honors the divine siblings. A prayer recited by the sister to her brother requests him to enjoy her offerings of food and eat them to please Yama and Yamuna.

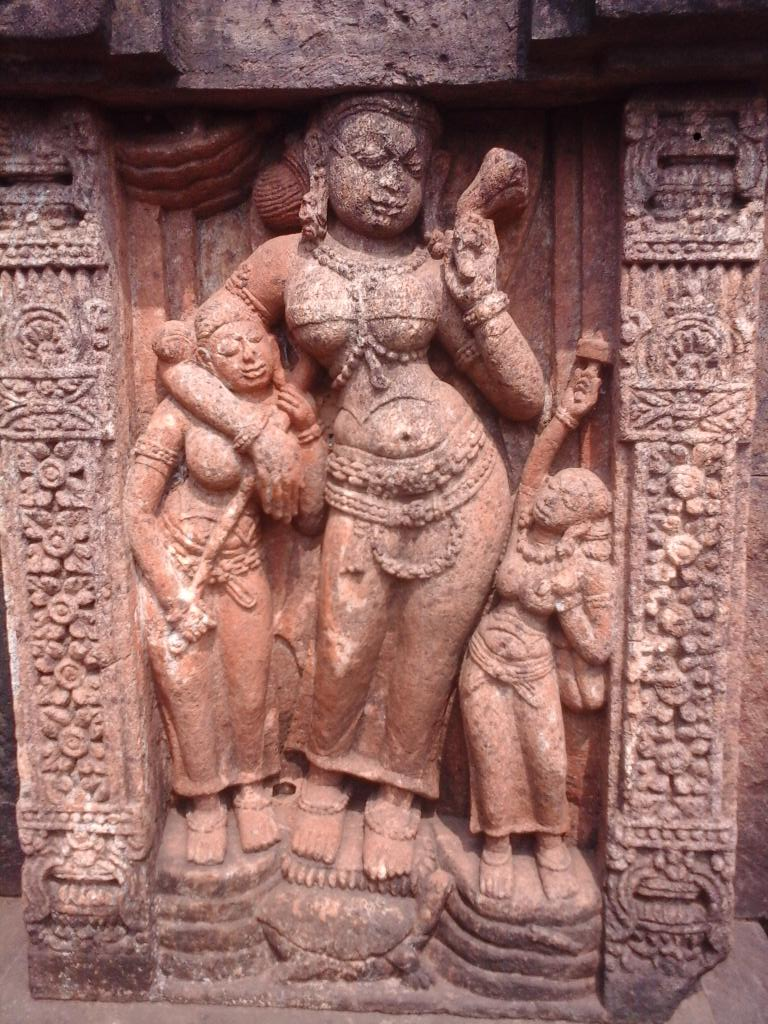
Yamuna with attendants, 10th century, Ratangiri temple.

== Association with Krishna ==
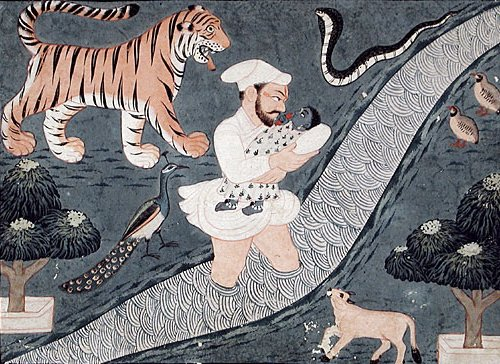
Krishna being carried over Yamuna by Vasudeva just after his birth.

In Krishna's birth-story, Krishna's father Vasudeva was carrying the new-born Krishna to safety by crossing the Yamuna river. He asked Yamuna to make a way for him to cross the river, which she did by creating a passage. This was the first time that she saw Krishna whom she marries in later life. Yamuna wanted to touch the feet of the baby which she did at deeper depths of the river and as a result the river became very calm.

Krishna also spent most of youth in Vrindavan on the banks of Yamuna, playing the flute and playing with his consort Radha and the gopis on the banks.

The Bhagavata Purana narrates: Once, an adult Krishna visited his cousins – the five Pandava brothers with their common wife Draupadi and their mother Kunti in their capital Indraprastha (modern-day Delhi), located on the banks of the Yamuna. The eldest Pandava Yudhishthira requests Krishna to stay with them for a couple of days. One day, Krishna and the middle Pandava Arjuna go for hunting in the forest. During their hunting, Arjuna was tired. He and Krishna went to the Yamuna and bathed and drank the clear water. There, a lovely girl was strolling along the river bank. Krishna who saw her and asked Arjuna to meet her to know who she was. When Arjuna inquired, the girl told him that she was Kalindi, the daughter of Surya, and that she was living in a house constructed by her father in the river where she has been was performing austerities with intent to have Vishnu as her husband and would remain there, until she finds him. Arjuna conveys Kalindi's message to Krishna, the avatar of Vishnu, who readily agreed to marry the beautiful damsel. Then they traveled to Indraprastha with Kalindi in the chariot and met Yudhishthira. After a stay of few days there, Krishna and Kalindi returned to his capital Dvaraka with their entourage and duly married each other. According to the Bhagavata Purana she had ten sons: Shruta, Kavi, Vrsa, Vira, Subahu, Bhadra, Santi, Darsa, Purnamasa, and the youngest, Somaka. The Vishnu Purana mentions that she had many sons headed by Shruta.

The Bhagavata Purana also narrates: Krishna's elder brother Balarama was staying in Ambadi on Yamuna's banks for a few months. Once, he was frolicking with the gopis on the river banks and desired to play in the waters. Experiencing the heat of the sun, Balarama felt a need to take a bath in the river. However, he refused to walk to the waters and called upon the river to come near him, but the chaste Yamuna refused despite repeated orders from Balarama. An angry Balarama dragged the river by his weapon – the plough and changed its course, hurting the river goddess. Terrified, the river assumed her form as a goddess and bowed to Balarama and asked his forgiveness. A pacified Balarama ordered the river to flood the forest so he could bathe and play in her waters, and the river complied.

== Religious significance ==
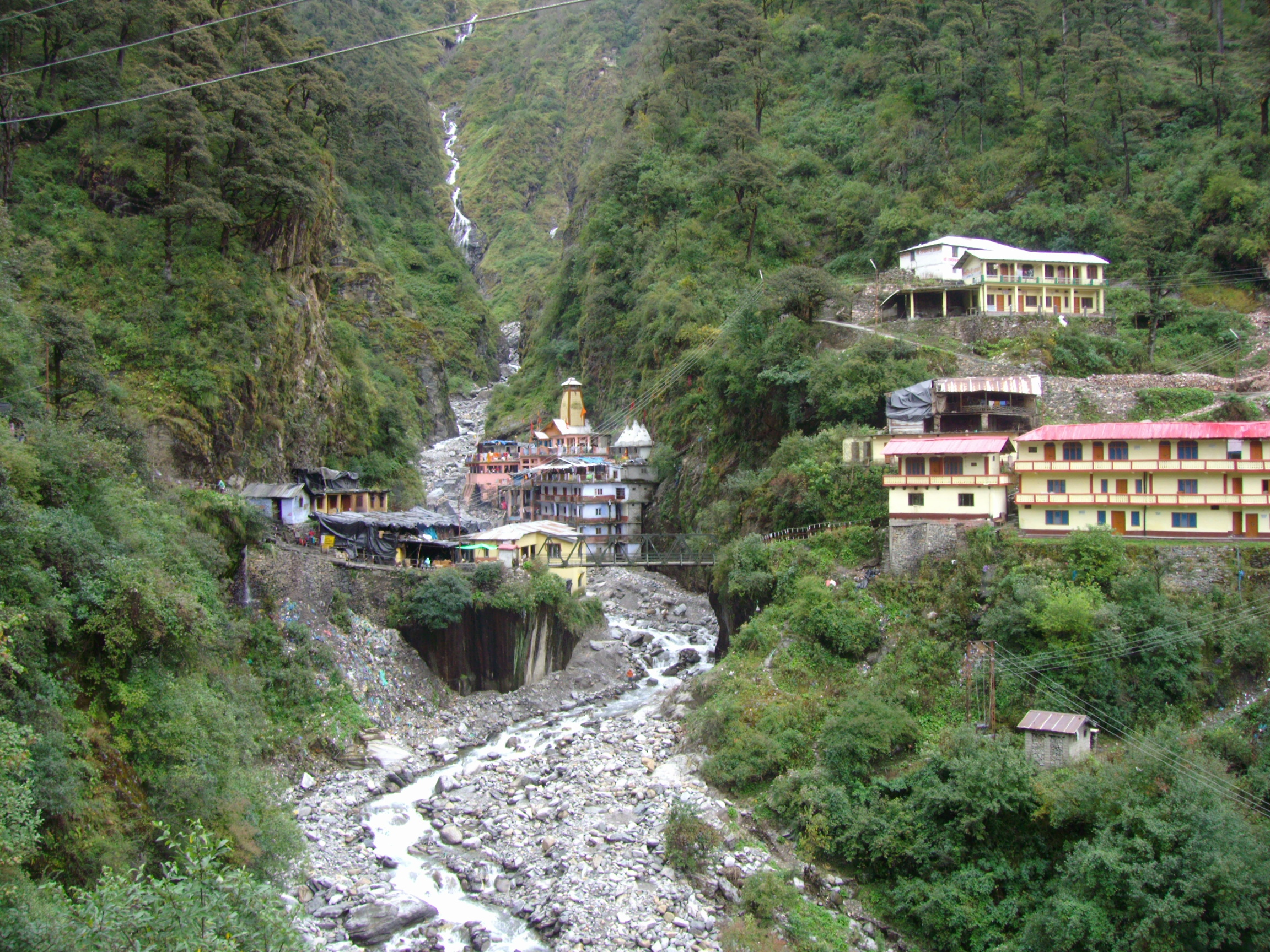
A temple dedicated to Yamuna at Yamunotri near the source of the river.

Yamuna is one of the holiest rivers in Hinduism. Yamuna is only second to the Ganges (Ganga), the holiest river in Hinduism. Her confluence with the Ganges and the mythical Sarasvati River is called Triveni Sangam, which is a very holy pilgrimage spot. Other pilgrimage sites along the river banks include Yamuna's source Yamunotri, Mathura and Bateshvar.

The Mahabharata mentions Yamuna being one of the seven tributaries of the Ganges. Drinking its waters is described to absolve sin. The river is mentioned many times in the epic as backdrop for events like yajnas (sacrifices), austerities and even a suicide by a defeated minister Hamsa of Jarasandha.

Various Puranas narrate the greatness of bathing in the Yamuna. The Padma Purana narrates the story of two brothers, who lived a life of indulgence and lust and gave up the virtuous ways. They finally plunged in poverty and resorted to robbery and were killed by beasts in the forest. Both of them reached Yama's court for judgement. While the elder brother was sentenced to Naraka (hell), the younger was granted Svarga (heaven). Astonished, the younger brother asked the reason for it, as both had lived similar lives. Yama explained that the younger brother had lived in the ashram of a sage on Yamuna's banks and bathed in the sacred river for two months. The first month absolved him of sins and the second one granted him a place in heaven.

== See also ==
- Ganga
- Tapati
- Sarasvati
- Rivers in Hinduism

== Bibliography ==
- Bhattacharji, Sukumari (1970), The Indian Theogony: A Comparative Study of Indian Mythology from the Vedas to the Purānas, CUP Archive, GGKEY:0GBP50CQXWN
- Bhattacharji, Sukumari (1998), Legends Of Devi, Orient Blackswan, ISBN 978-81-250-1438-6
- Conway, D. J. (1994), Maiden, Mother, Crone: The Myth and Reality of the Triple Goddess, Llewellyn Worldwide, ISBN 978-0-87542-171-1
- Dalal, Roshen (2010), The Religions of India: A Concise Guide to Nine Major Faiths, Penguin Books India, ISBN 978-0-14-341517-6
- Mani, Vettam (1975), Puranic Encyclopaedia: a Comprehensive Dictionary with Special Reference to the Epic and Puranic Literature, Motilal Banarsidass Publishers, ISBN 978-0-8426-0822-0
- O'Flaherty, Wendy Doniger (1980), The Origins of Evil in Hindu Mythology, University of California Press, ISBN 978-0-520-04098-4
- Ushanas, Egbert Richter (1997), The Indus Script and the Ṛg-Veda, Motilal Banarsidass, ISBN 978-81-208-1405-9
