= Tapati =

Hindu goddess associated with the river Tapati

- Goddess of the Tapti River
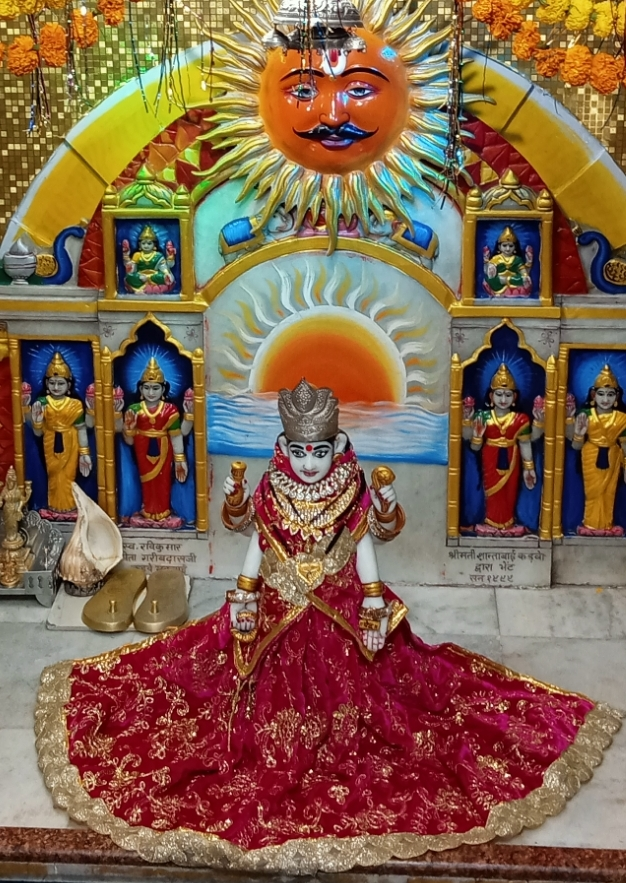
- Shrine of the goddess Tapati, Multai.
- Affiliation: Devi
- Abode: Suryaloka
- Mantra: Om Sūryaputrī Tāpatya Namaḥ

Genealogy
- Parents: Surya and Chhaya
- Siblings: Shani, Savarni Manu, Shraddhadeva Manu, Yami, Yama, Ashvins, Revanta and Bhadra
- Consort: Samvarana
- Children: Kuru

Tapati (Sanskrit: तपती, romanized: Tapatī) is a goddess in Hinduism. She is known also as the goddess of the river Tapati (regionally rendered Tapti) and mother-goddess of the south (home of the sun) where she brings heat to the earth. According to Hindu texts, Tapati is the daughter of Surya, the sun god, and Chhaya, one of the wives of Surya.

== Etymology ==
Tapati's name literally means the "warming", "the hot one", "burning one". This name is possibly connected to that of the queen of the Scythian gods, Tabiti, and it is possible that there was originally a dominant fire goddess in ancient Proto-Indo-Iranian religion.

== Legend ==
Tapati is originally mentioned in the Mahabharata two dozen times, as the wife of Samvarana and the mother of Kuru (the founder of the Kuru dynasty and the Kuru kingdom). The story of both characters has also been found in other Hindu texts such as the Bhagavata Purana. According to these texts, Tapati's home is situated on the banks of river Tapati. The text extols the goddess with the statement that no one in the three worlds could match her in beauty, having perfect features, and severe religious self-discipline.

In the Mahabharata, Arjuna asks a gandharva about the origin of the name Tapatya. The gandharva tells him that the sun once had a beautiful daughter named Tapati, for whom he wished to find a suitable husband. An early Kaurava king named Samvarana worships the sun and is selected as her husband. One day, while out for hunting, the king's horse dies. While wandering, Samvarana sees Tapati bathing in the sunshine and is mesmerised by her beauty. When he asks Tapati about her identity, she immediately disappears. The king falls unconscious, but when he stirs, he sees that Tapati has returned. He declares his love for her, and begs her to be with him. Tapati informs him that she is smitten with him as well, but refers him to her father for his approval for their marriage. The king starts to meditate upon the sage Vasishtha for two weeks, who appears and gathers that the king had fallen in love with a goddess. Vashishta ascends to the sky, asking Surya to approve the marriage of Samvarana and Tapati. Surya agrees to it, and the two promptly get married.

According to some Hindu texts, Yami is the elder sister of Tapati, and she has two brothers, Shani and Yama.

== Worship ==
Since the goddess Tapati is regarded to be the named after or the personification of the river Tapati, people worship her both in the form of a goddess and as that of an important river having many admirable qualities, enumerated in Hindu texts.
