= Yama =

Hindu god of death

- God of Death and Justice
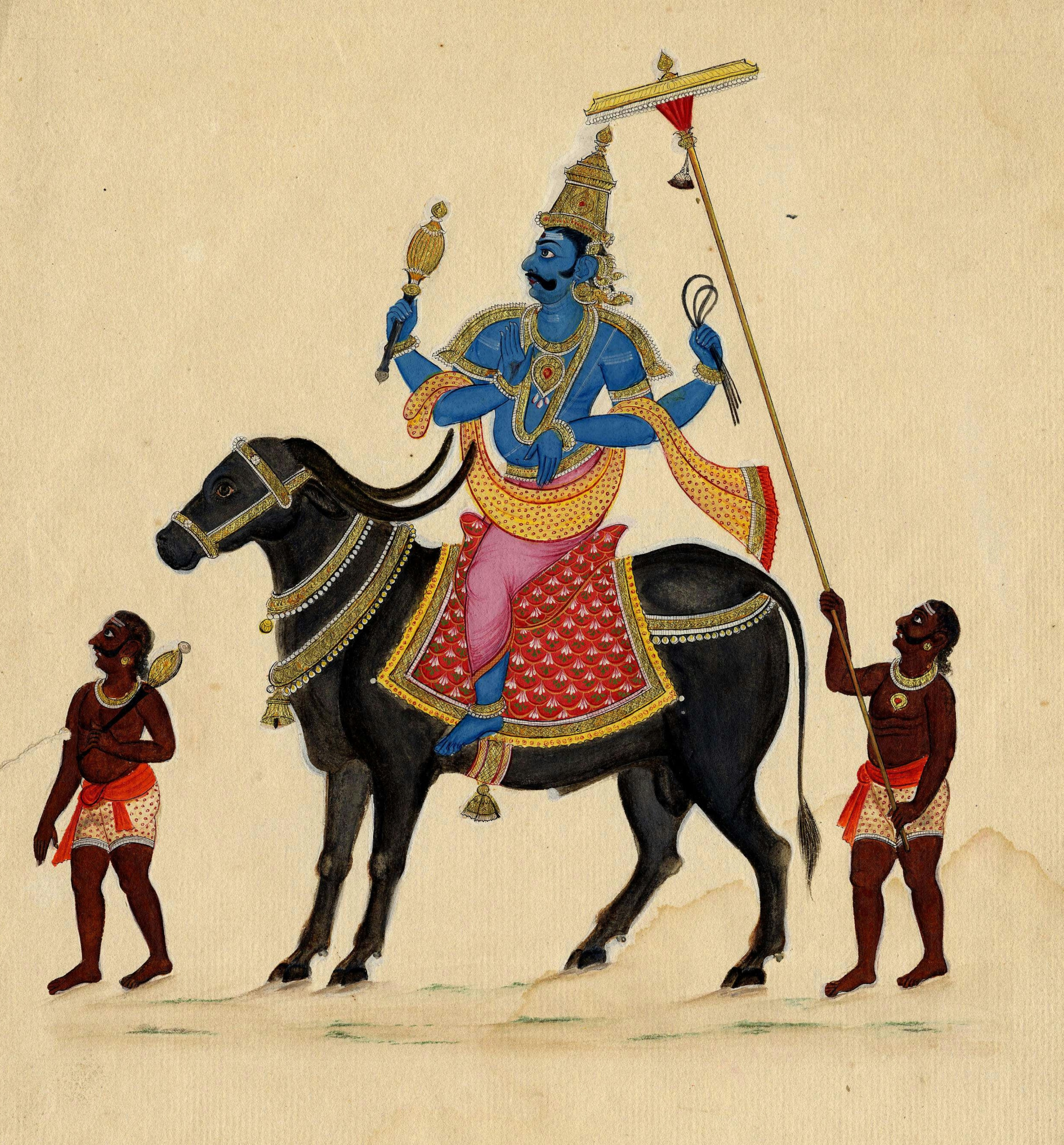
- A 19th-century painting of Yama on his mount
- Other names: Dharmarāja, Yamarāja, Yammui
- Devanagari: यम
- Affiliation: Lokapala, Deva, Gana
- Abode: Naraka (Yamaloka)
- Planet: Pluto
- Mantra: Oṁ sūryaputrāya vidmahe Mahākālāya dhīmahi Tanno yama pracodayāt; Om Vaivasvadaya Vidmahe Dandahastaya Dhimahi Tanno Yama Prachodayat
- Weapon: Daṇḍa, Noose and Mace
- Mount: Buffalo

Genealogy
- Parents: Surya (father); Sanjna (mother)
- Siblings: Yamuna, Ashvins, Shraddhadeva Manu, Revanta, Shani and Tapati
- Consort: Dhumorna (Note: Other names of Yama's consort include Urmila and Shyamala. Yama is also sometimes depicted with three consorts Hema-mala, Sushila and Vijaya. When identified with Dharmadeva, he is married to 10 or 13 daughters of Daksha.)
- Children: Sunita (daughter); Yudhishthira (son) (Note: When identified with Dharmadeva)

Equivalents
- Greek: Hades
- Manipuri: Thongalel
- Norse: Ymir
- Roman: Remus, Dis Pater, Pluto
- Egyptian: Osiris, Sokar

Yama (Sanskrit: यम, lit. 'twin'), also known as Kāla and Dharmarāja, is the Hindu god of death and justice, responsible for the dispensation of law and punishment of sinners in his abode, Naraka. He is often identified with Dharmadeva, the personification of Dharma, though the two deities have different origins and myths.

In Vedic tradition, Yama was considered the first mortal who died and espied the way to the celestial abodes; as a result, he became the ruler of the departed. His role, characteristics, and abode have been expounded in texts such as the Upanishads, the Ramayana, the Mahabharata, and the Puranas.

Yama is described as the twin of the goddess Yami, and the son of the god Surya (sun) (in earlier traditions Vivasvat) and Sanjna. He judges the souls of the dead and, depending on their deeds, assigns them to the realm of the Pitris (forefathers), Naraka (hell), or to be reborn on the earth.

Yama is one of the Lokapalas (guardians of the realms), appointed as the protector of the south direction. He is often depicted as a dark-complexioned man riding a buffalo and carrying a noose or mace to capture souls.

Yama was subsequently adopted by Buddhist, Chinese, Tibetan, Korean, and Japanese mythology as the king of hell. In modern culture, Yama has been depicted in various safety campaigns in India.

== Etymology and epithets ==
The word "Yama" means 'twin' (Yama has a twin sister, Yami), and later came to mean 'binder' (derived from "yam"); the word also means 'moral rule or duty' (i.e. dharma), 'self-control', 'forbearance', and 'cessation'.

Yama is also known by many other names, including Kala ('time'), Pashi (one who carries a noose') and Dharmaraja ('lord of Dharma').

=== Identification with Dharmadeva ===
Yama and Dharmadeva, the god personifying the concept of Dharma, are generally considered to be one and the same person. Author Vettam Mani speculates a reason for this identification:

"Vyasa has used as synonyms for Dharmadeva in the Mahabharata the words Dharmaraja, Vṛsa and Yama. Now among the synonyms for the two there are two words in common- Dharmaraja and Yama. This has led to this misunderstanding. Because Kala weighs the evil and good in man he got the name Dharmaraja. Dharmadeva got that name because he is the incarnation of Dharma. The real name of Kāla is Yama. Dharmadeva got the name Yama because he possesses 'Yama' (control of the self for moral conduct)."

— Vettam Mani

Mani believes that Yama and Dharmadeva are two different deities, citing that the Puranic scriptures depict at least two different legends about the deities —

- Yama is the judge of the dead, while Dharmadeva is one of the Prajapatis (agents of creation).
- Yama is the son of sun god Surya and his wife Sanjna, while Dharmadeva is born from the chest of the god Brahma.
- Yama is married to Dhumorna. On the other hand, Dharmadeva is married to ten or thirteen daughters of Daksha.
- Yama has a daughter Sunita. Dharmadeva fathered many sons from his wives. He also fathered Yudhishthira, the eldest of the Pandavas.

== Iconography ==
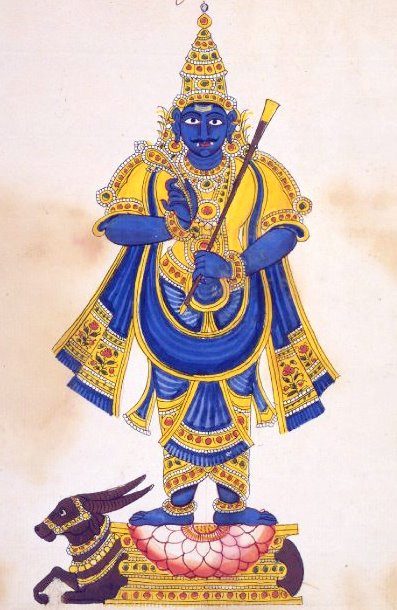
The deity Yama with fangs and holding a daṇḍa (a rod). He stands on a lotus covered dais, behind which lies a buffalo, his vahana (conveyance).

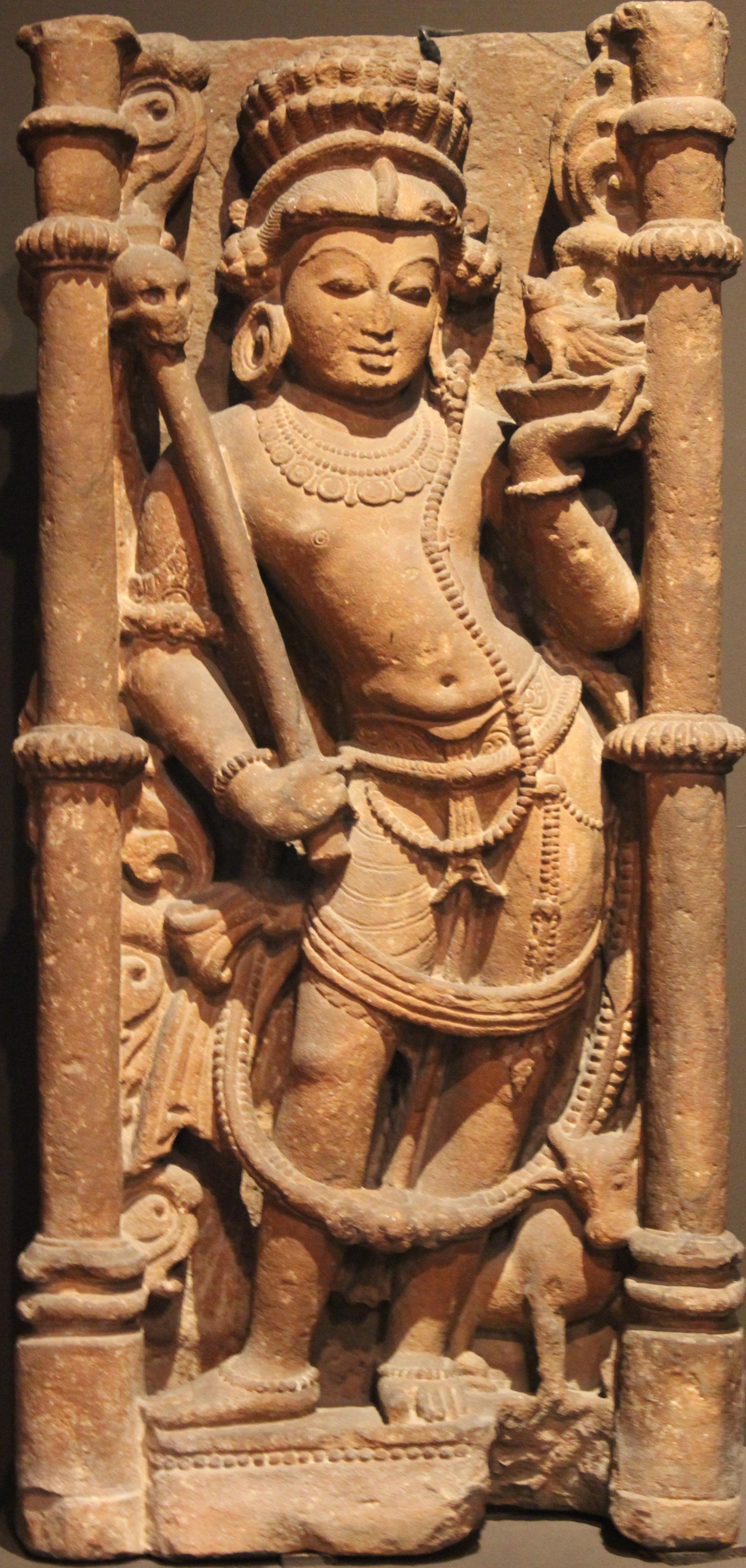
Yama depicted in youthful form

In Hinduism, Yama is the lokapala ("Guardian of the realms") of the south and the son of Surya. Three hymns (10, 14, and 35) in the 10th book of the Rig Veda are addressed to him. In Puranas, Yama is described as having four arms, protruding fangs, and complexion of storm clouds, with a wrathful expression; surrounded by a garland of flames; dressed in red, yellow, or blue garments; holding a noose and a mace or sword; and riding a water-buffalo. He holds a noose (pāśa) of rope in one hand, with which he seizes the lives of people who are about to die. He is also depicted holding a danda (which is a Sanskrit word for "staff"). Yama is the son of Surya and Saranyu. He is the twin brother of Yami, brother of Shraddhadeva Manu and the step brother of Shani and his son was Katila. There are several temples across India dedicated to Yama. As per Vishnu Dharmottara, Yama is said to be represented on a buffalo, with garments like of heated gold, and all kinds of ornaments. He has four arms with the complexion of rain clouds. Dhumorna, his wife, is represented sitting on the left haunch of Yama and she has the colour of a dark blue lotus.

== Literature ==
=== Vedas ===
In the Rigveda, Yama is the son of a solar deity Vivasvat and Saraṇyū and has a twin sister named Yamī. He is cognate to the Avestan Yima, son of Vīvanhvant. The majority of Yama's appearances are in the first and tenth book. Yama is closely associated with Agni in the Rigveda. Agni is both Yama's friend and priest, and Yama is stated to have found the hiding Agni. In the Rigveda, Yama is the king of the dead, and one of the two kings that humans see when they reach heaven (the other being Varuna). Yama is stated to be a gatherer of the people, who gave dead people a place to rest. Out of the three Rigvedic heavens, the third and highest belong to Yama (the lower two belong to Savitr). Here is where the gods resides, and Yama is surrounded by music. In the ritual sacrifice, Yama is offered soma and ghee, and is invoked to sit at the sacrifice, lead the sacrificers to the abode of the gods, and provide long life.

In the dialogue hymn between Yama and Yamī (RV 10.10), as the first two humans, Yamī tries to convince her twin brother Yama to have sex with her. Yamī makes a variety of arguments, including continuing the mortal line, that Tvashtar created them as a couple in the womb, and that Dyaush and Prithvi are famous for their incest. Yama argues that their ancestors, "the Gandharva in the waters and the watery maiden", as a reason not to commit incest, that Mitra-Varuna are strict in their ordinances, and that they have spies everywhere. By the end of the hymn, Yamī becomes frustrated but Yama remains firm in his stance. However, by RV 10.13.4, Yama is stated to have chosen to leave offspring, but Yamī is not mentioned.

Vedic literature states that Yama is the first mortal, and that he chose to die, and then proceeded to create a path to the "other world", where deceased ancestral fathers reside. Due to being the first man to die, he is considered the chief of the dead, lord of settlers, and a father. Throughout the course of Vedic literature, Yama becomes more and more associated with the negative aspects of death and eventually becomes the god of death. He also becomes associated with Antaka (the Ender), Mṛtyu (Death), Nirṛti (Decease), and Sleep.

Yama has two four-eyed, broad nosed, brindled, reddish-brown dogs, Sharvara and Shyama, who are the sons of Saramā. However, in the Atharvaveda, one of dogs is brindled and the other is dark. The dogs are meant to track down those who are about to die, and guard the path to Yama's realm. Scholars who adhere to Theodor Aufrecht's interpretation of RV 7.55 state that the dogs were also meant to keep wicked men out of heaven.

The Vājasaneyi Saṃhitā (the White Yajurveda) states Yama and his twin sister Yamī both reside in the highest heaven. The Atharvaveda states Yama is unsurpassable and is greater than Vivasvat.

The Taittirīya Aranyaka and the Āpastamba Śrauta state that Yama has golden-eyed and iron-hoofed horses.

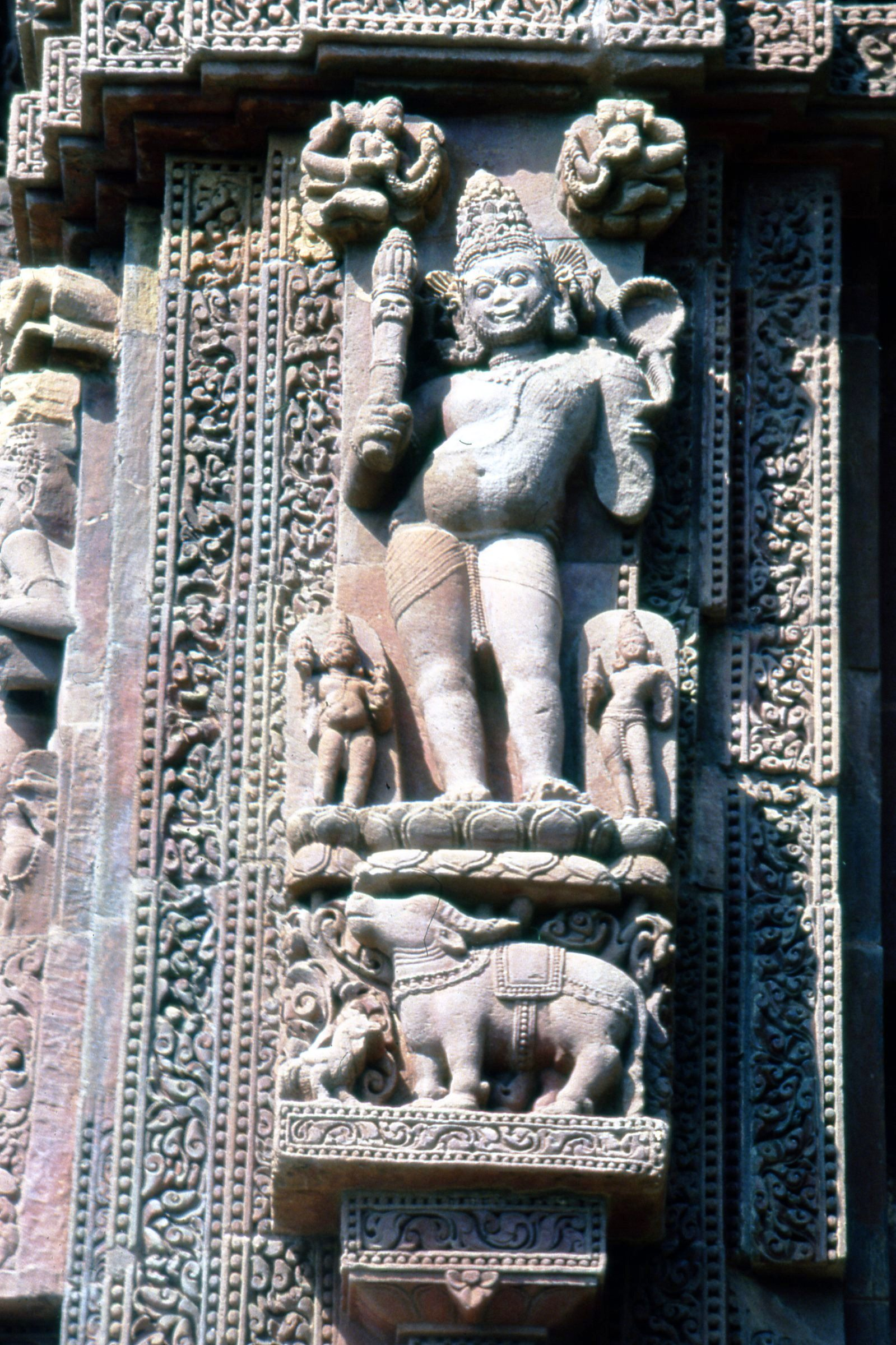
Yama depicted on Hindu temple

==== Upanishads ====
In the Katha Upanishad, Yama is portrayed as a teacher to the Brahmin boy Nachiketa. Having granted three boons to Nachiketa, their conversation evolves to a discussion of the nature of being, knowledge, the Atman (i.e. the soul, self) and moksha (liberation). From the translation by Brahmrishi Vishvatma Bawra:

Yama says: I know the knowledge that leads to heaven. I will explain it to you so that you will understand it. O Nachiketas, remember this knowledge is the way to the endless world; the support of all worlds; and abides in subtle form within the intellects of the wise.

— Chapter 1, Section 1, Verse 14

=== Mahabharata ===
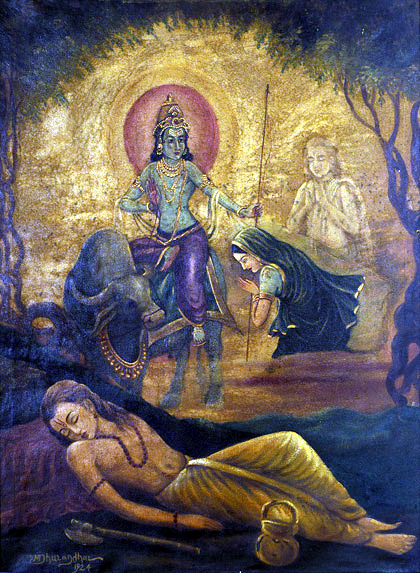
A depiction of Yama and Savitri from the Vana Parva

In the epic Mahabharata, Dharmadeva (who is identified with Yama) is the father of Yudhishthira, the oldest brother of the five Pandavas. Yama most notably appears in person in the Yaksha Prashna and the Vana Parva, and is mentioned in the Bhagavad Gita.

==== Yaksha Prashna ====
In the Yaksha Prashna, Dharmadeva (Yama) appears as a yaksha (nature spirit) in the form of a crane to question Yudhishthira and test his righteousness. Impressed by Yudhishthira's strict adherence to dharma and his answers to the riddles posed, Yama reveals himself as his father, blesses him, and brings his younger Pandava brothers back to life.

The Yaksha [Yama] asked, "What enemy is invincible? What constitutes an incurable disease? What sort of man is noble and what sort is ignoble"? And Yudhishthira responded, "Anger is the invincible enemy. Covetousness constitutes a disease that is incurable. He is noble who desires the well-being of all creatures, and he is ignoble who is without mercy".

==== Vana Parva ====
In the Vana Parva, when Yudhishthira asks the sage Markandeya whether there has ever been a woman whose devotion matched Draupadi's, the sage replied by relating the story of Savitri and Satyavan. After Savitri's husband Satyavan died, Yama arrived to carry away his soul. However, Yama was so impressed with Savitri's purity and dedication to dharma and to her husband, he was convinced to instead bring Satyavan back to life.

==== Udyoga Parva ====
In the Udyoga Parva, it is stated that the wife of Yama is called Urmila or Dhumorna.

==== Bhagavad Gita ====
In the Bhagavad Gita, part of the Mahabharata, Krishna states:

Of the celestial Naga snakes I am Ananta; of the aquatic deities I am Varuna. Of departed ancestors I am Aryamā and among the dispensers of law I am Yama, lord of death.

— Chapter 10, Verse 29

=== Puranas ===
Yama and his abode are frequently mentioned in the Puranas. Some Puranas like Agni Purana and Linga Purana mention him as son of Rajni and Surya.

==== Bhagavata Purana / Srimad Bhagavatam ====
===== Third and Fourth Canto =====
In the third and fourth cantos of the Srimad Bhagavatam, Yama was incarnated as a shudra called Vidura due to being cursed by a sage for being too harsh in his punishments. From the A. C. Bhaktivedanta Swami Prabhupada / Bhaktivedanta Book Trust (BBT) translation:

As long as Vidura played the part of a śūdra, being cursed by Maṇḍūka Muni [also known as Māṇḍavya Muni], Aryamā officiated at the post of Yamarāja to punish those who committed sinful acts.

— Canto 1, Chapter 13, Verse 15

Vidura, a devotee of Krishna, is the main protagonist in the third canto. In this canto, after being thrown out of his home by King Dhritarashtra (his older half-brother) for admonishing the Kauravas' ignoble behaviour towards the Pandavas, Vidura went on a pilgrimage where he met other devotees of Krishna such as Uddhava and the sage Maitreya, the latter of whom revealed Vidura's true origin to him:

I know that you are now Vidura due to the cursing of Māṇḍavya Muni and that formerly you were King Yamarāja, the great controller of living entities after their death. You were begotten by the son of Satyavatī, Vyāsadeva, in the kept wife of his brother.

— Canto 3, Chapter 5, Verse 20

Krishna also states Yama punishes sinners, as relayed to Vidura (again, an incarnation of Yama) by Maitreya during their conversation about the origin and creation of the multiverse:

The brahmanas, the cows and the defenceless creatures are My [Krishna's] own body. Those whose faculty of judgement has been impaired by their own sin look upon those as distinct from Me. They are just like furious serpents, and they are angrily torn apart by the bills of the vulturelike messengers of Yamaraja, the superintendent of sinful persons.

— Canto 3, Chapter 16, Verse 10

A detailed account of the punishment of a sinner upon their death is also provided, beginning with their seizure and journey to Yamaloka (i.e. Hell):

As a criminal is arrested for punishment by the constables of the state, a personal engaged in criminal sense gratification is similarly arrested by the Yamadutas, who bind him by the neck with a strong rope and cover his subtle body so that he may undergo severe punishment. While carried by the constables of Yamaraja, he is overwhelmed and trembles in their hands. While passing on the road [to Yamaloka] he is bitten by dogs, and he can remember the sinful activities of his life. He is thus terribly distressed.

— Canto 3, Chapter 30, Verses 20–21

===== Sixth Canto =====
In the sixth canto, Yama (not as Vidura nor with Aryama in the post; see third and fourth canto) instructs his messengers, the Yamadutas, when questioned about who has supreme authority in the universe since there are so many gods and demigods:

Yamarāja said: My dear servants, you have accepted me as the Supreme, but factually I am not. Above me, and above all the other demigods, including Indra and Candra, is the one supreme master and controller. The partial manifestations of His personality are Brahmā, Viṣṇu and Śiva, who are in charge of the creation, maintenance and annihilation of this universe. He is like the two threads that form the length and breadth of a woven cloth. The entire world is controlled by Him just as a bull is controlled by a rope in its nose.

— Canto 6, Chapter 3, Verse 12

===== Tenth Canto =====
In the tenth canto, Krishna and Balarama travel to Yama's abode to bring back the dead son of their Guru, Sandipani Muni:

Lord Janārdana took the conchshell that had grown around the demon’s body and went back to the chariot. Then He proceeded to Saṁyamanī, the beloved capital of Yamarāja, the lord of death. Upon arriving there with Lord Balarāma, He loudly blew His conchshell, and Yamarāja, who keeps the conditioned souls in check, came as soon as he heard the resounding vibration. Yamarāja elaborately worshiped the two Lords with great devotion, and then he addressed Lord Kṛṣṇa, who lives in everyone’s heart: "O Supreme Lord Viṣṇu, what shall I do for You and Lord Balarāma, who are playing the part of ordinary humans?"

The Supreme Personality of Godhead said: Suffering the bondage of his past activity, My spiritual master’s son was brought here to you. O great King, obey My command and bring this boy to Me without delay.

Yamarāja said, "So be it," and brought forth the guru’s son. Then those two most exalted Yadus presented the boy to Their spiritual master and said to him, "Please select another boon."

— Canto 10, Chapter 45, Verses 42–46

==== Brahma Purana ====
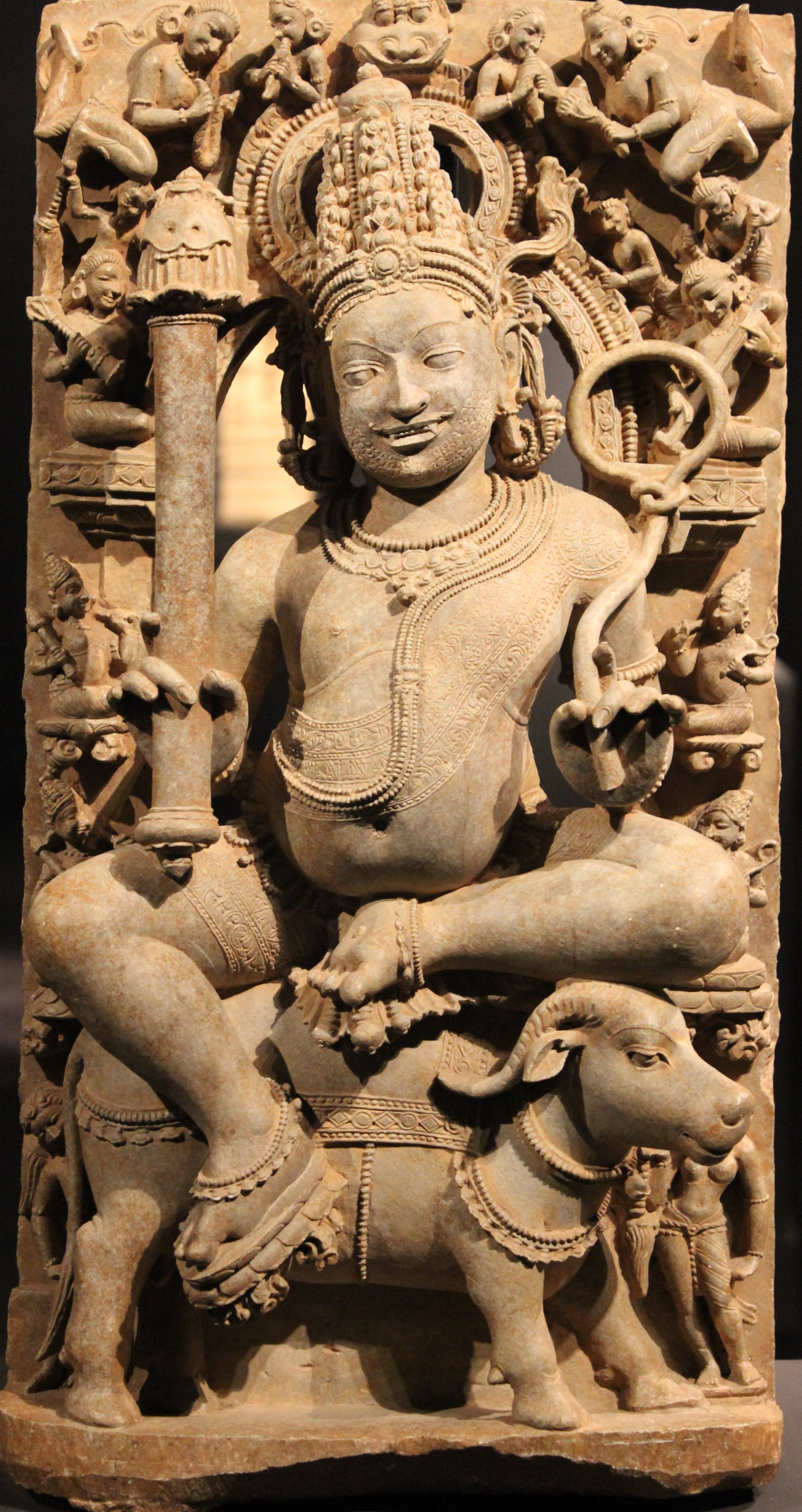
Yama depicted as regent of the South

In the Brahma Purana, Yama is the lord of justice and is associated with Dharma. Mentions include:

- Chapter 2.29–30: Yama has a daughter called Sunita and a grandson called Vena, who turned his back on dharma
- Chapter 20: The various hells of Yama are described along with their concomitant sins
- Chapter 30.64–68: Yama chastises his mother for cursing him (to his father)
- Chapter 35.11: Yama is destroyed by Shiva after coming to claim the soul of Markandeya (and at the behest of the Gods is revived afterwards)
- Chapter 48.4: Krishna describes himself as Brahma, Vishnu, Shiva, Indra, and Yama ("I am Yama who restrains the universe.")
- Chapter 105: Descriptions of the "terrible servants of Yama" are given
- Chapter 126.42.50: Descriptions of the agony of death for sinners including being caught by Yama with His noose, and the tortures suffered in His abode
- Chapter 24 (book 4): Yama is killed in battle by Karttikeya; on Shiva's orders, Yama is revived by Nandi.

Riding on his terrible buffalo, the god of Death Yama hastened to that place. He was holding his sceptre (rod of chastisement). His physical body was yellow in colour. In prowess he was comparable to none. He was unparalleled in brilliance, strength and power of demanding obedience. His limbs were well developed and he wore garlands.

— Brahma Purana, Chapter 30.9–12

==== Garuda Purana ====
In the Garuda Purana, Yama and his realm where sinners are punished are detailed extensively, including in the twelfth chapter called 'The Realm of Yama'. In this text, the name of Yama's wife is Syamala.

==== Matsya Purana ====
In the Matsya Purana, In addition to his battles against the asuras, Yama is mentioned extensively:

- Chapter XI: Yama as boy is cursed
- Chapter XLIX: Yama fights Janamejaya in Hell and after being captured, gives him knowledge of emancipation
- Chapter XCIII: Yama is declared to be of Saturn
- Chapter CII: Synonyms of Yama are given (Dharmaraja, Mrityo, Antaka, Vaivaswata, Kala, Sarvabhutaksaya, Audumbara, Dadhna, Nila, Paramesthi, Vrikodara, Chitra, and Chitragupta)
- Chapter CCXLVIII: Yama – like others – is controlled by Vishnu
- Chapter CCLIII: Yama is 13th of the 32 Devas

==== Vishnu Purana ====
In the Vishnu Purana, Yama is the son of sun-god Surya (named Vivasvan in the Vedas, also means 'sun') and Sandhya (named Saranya in the Vedas, is another name), the daughter of Vishvakarma (named Tvastar in the Vedas) emerged from the navel of Vishvakarman. During a conversation with his servant, Yama states that he is subordinate to Vishnu. (Note: Yama told his servant, “Do not touch those who are devoted to Vishnu. I am the lord of all the others except these. I am not really independent, I work under the supervision of Vishnu. He is also capable of punishing me. Even the gods worship the lotus-like feet of Vishnu. Stay away from the devotees of Vishnu.”) While establishing the relationship between Vishnu and Lakshmi, the Chapter 8 of Book 1 describes Dhumorna as Yama's consort.

=== Marriage and children ===
Varying information about Yama's consorts and children are found in Hindu texts. The Mahābhārata, the Vishnu Purana and the Vishnudharmottara describe Dhumorna (also known as Urmila) as his consort. In the Garuda Purana, Syamala is the name of Yama's wife. According to some other texts, Yama has three consorts—Hema-mala, Sushila and Vijaya. (Note: A myth about Yama's marriage to Vijaya or Shyamala is found in the Bhavishya Purana where she is the daughter of a Brahmina lady named Urmila.) When identified with Dharmadeva, he also married 10 or 13 daughters of the god Daksha.

According to the Brahma Purana, the name of Yama's eldest daughter is Sunita, who is the mother of the king Vena. Sobhavati, the wife of Chitragupta, is sometimes mentioned to be Yama's daughter. In the Mahabharata, Yudhishthira, the eldest Pandava, was blessed by Dharma to his mother Kunti.

== Worship ==
Yama Dharmaraja Temple is a Hindu temple located at Thiruchitrambalam in the Thanjavur district of Tamil Nadu, India. The temple is dedicated to Yama.

== In other religions ==
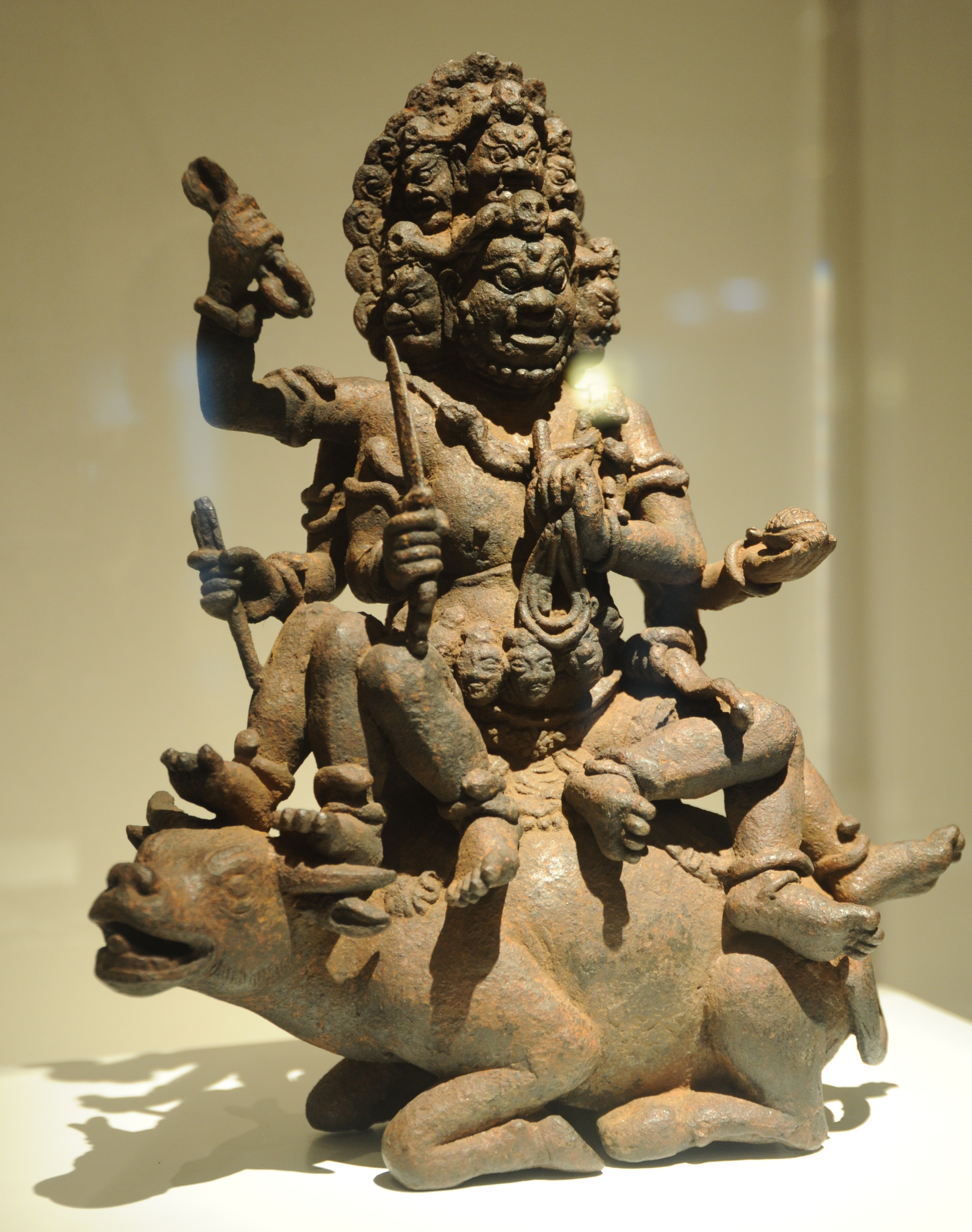
Yama is revered in Tibet as the Lord of Death and as a guardian of spiritual practice.

Mentioned in the Pāli Canon of Theravada Buddhism, Yama subsequently entered Buddhist mythology in East Asia, Southeast Asia and Sri Lanka as a Dharmapala. He is also recognized in Sikhism.

== In popular culture ==
In addition to his depiction in movie and television adaptations of scriptures such as in the television series, Yama has also been depicted in road safety campaigns in India, particularly to warn against the dangers of riding motorcycles without helmets. Dharma Raja has been depicted as a character in "The Star-Touched Queen" and "A Crown of Wishes" by Roshani Chokshi.

== See also ==
- Erlik Khan
- Jamshid
- Kalantaka
- Kṣitigarbha
- Naraka
- Vaitarna River
- Yama (Buddhism)

== Bibliography ==
- Anthony, David W. (2007). The Horse, the Wheel, and Language: How Bronze-Age Riders from the Eurasian Steppes Shaped the Modern World. Princeton University Press. ISBN 9781400831104.
- Apte, Vaman Shivram (1975) [1965]. The Practical Sanskrit–English Dictionary (Fourth, revised and enlarged ed.). Motilal Banarsidass. ISBN 81-208-0567-4 – via Archive.org.
- Arya, Ravi Prakash; Joshi, K.L. (2001). Ṛgveda Saṁhita (Second Revised ed.). Parimal Publications. ISBN 81-7110-138-7. "Sanskrit text, English translation according to H.H. Wilson and Bhāṣya of Sāyaṇācārya" 4 volumes
- Chidbhavananda, Swami (1997). Siva Sahasranama Stotram (Third ed.). Sri Ramakrishna Tapovanam.
- Fergus, Jon William (2017). The Vedas. CreateSpace Independent Publishing Platform. ISBN 9781541294714 – via Google Books. "The Samhitas of the Rig, Yajur (White and Black), Sama, and Atharva Vedas"
- Lincoln, Bruce (1975). "The Indo-European Myth of Creation". History of Religions. 15 (2): 121–145. doi:10.1086/462739. ISSN 0018-2710. S2CID 162101898.
- Lincoln, Bruce (1991). Death, War, and Sacrifice: Studies in Ideology & Practice. University of Chicago Press. ISBN 978-0-226-48199-9.
- MacDonell, A.A. (1974) [1898]. Vedic Mythology (Reprint ed.). Delhi: Motilal Banarsidass Publishers Private Ltd. ISBN 81-208-1113-5 – via Archive.org.
- Mallory, James P.; Adams, Douglas Q. (1997). Encyclopedia of Indo-European Culture. London: Routledge. ISBN 978-1-884964-98-5.
- Prabhupada, A.C. Bhaktivedanta, His Divine Grace, Swami (1993). "As It Is". Bhagavad-gita. The Bhaktivedanta Book Trust. ISBN 9789171495341 – via Google Books.
- Prabhupada, A.C. Bhaktivedanta, His Divine Grace, Swami (1972). "Third Canto: The Status Quo". Srimad-Bhagavatam. The Bhaktivedanta Book Trust. ISBN 978-9171496362 – via Google Books.
- Rao, T.A. Gopnatha (1914). Elements of Hindu Iconography. 2 volumes
- Wilson, Horace Hayman (1864). The Vishnu Purana. Trübner – via Google Books.
- Wood, Ernest; Subrahmanyam (2008). The Garuda Purana. BiblioBazaar, LLC. ISBN 978-1-4375-3213-5 – via Google Books.
