= Samvarana =

Character from Hindu epic Mahabharata

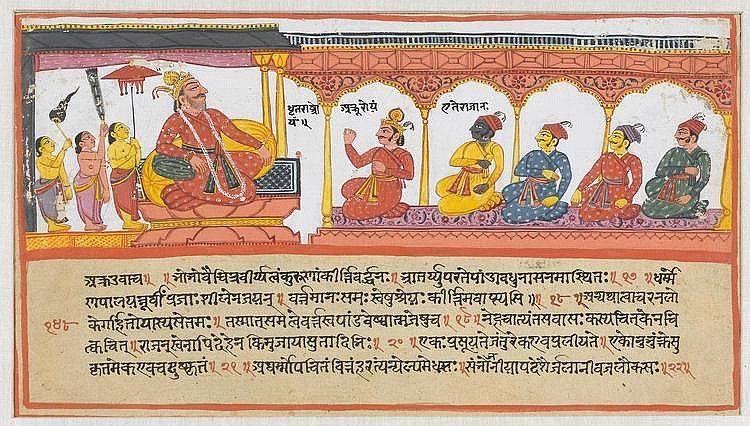
- King of Mahabharata

Information
- Affiliation: Character of Mahabharata
- Spouse: Tapati
- Children: Kuru
- Relatives: Riksha (father)

Samvarana (Sanskrit: संवरण, romanized: saṁvaraṇa), the name of a king in the Mahabharata. He was the son of Riksha, husband of Tapati and father of Kuru.

== Samvarana in the Mahabharata ==
In the Adi Parva, it is reported that once a great disaster overtook his people when Samvarana ruled them as a king. There were all kinds of plagues as well as famine, drought and disease. Powerful enemies with large armies attacked the country and the King had to take to flight with his family, friends and ministers, settling in the woodlands of the river Indus. Then, one day the Rishi Vasishtha visited them and stayed with them for eight years. Thereafter, Samvarana resolved to make him his priest and regained his whole kingdom and power with his help.

=== Marriage with Tapati ===
Once the King was wandering on a mountain after his horse had died. Suddenly he saw a young maiden of unequalled beauty who seemed like a dream to him. When he addressed her enquiring about her name and family, she suddenly disappeared, leaving the shocked King behind in great stupor. But a little later she reappeared, telling him that she was the daughter of Vivasvat, the Sun God and that she would leave it to her father to decide whether she may marry the King.

The King remained alone on the mountain for twelve days, trying to propitiate the Sun and directing his thoughts to his priest Vasishtha, who arrived soon, knowing by divine insight what was going on in the king’s mind. He offered to him to approach on his behalf the Sun God, who readily agreed to give his daughter Tapati to the King for the proposed marriage.

For twelve years, the King lived happily with his wife in the hills and mountains, withdrawing entirely from his duties. But then a perilous drought struck the country, whereupon Vasishtha called back Samvarana and his wife, whose return brought happiness and prosperity to all the citizens.

== Literature ==
- J.A.B. van Buitenen, Mahabharata Book 1, Chicago 1973, pp. 211–12; 325–29
- Wilfried Huchzermeyer, Studies in the Mahabharata. Indian Culture, Dharma and Spirituality in the Great Epic. Karlsruhe 2018, pp. 136–37. ISBN 978-3-931172-32-9
