= Tabiti =

Ancient Scythian goddess of fire and the hearth

- Fire, the hearth, society, kingship
- Gender: Female
- Region: Eurasian steppe
- Ethnic group: Scythic peoples
- Offspring: Papaios

Equivalents
- Greek: Hestia
- Hindu: Agni, Tapati
- Iranian: Atar

Tabiti (Scythian: *Tapatī; Ancient Greek: Ταβιτί, romanized: Tabití; Latin: Tabiti) was the Scythian goddess of the primordial fire which alone existed before the creation of the universe and was the basic essence and the source of all creation. She was the most venerated of all Scythian deities.

== Name ==
The name "Tabiti" (Ancient Greek: Ταβιτί) represents a Hellenisation of the Scythian name *Tapatī, which meant "the Burning One" or "the Flaming One," and was related to the Avestan term tāpaiie^{i}ti (𐬙𐬁𐬞𐬀𐬌𐬌𐬈𐬌𐬙𐬌) meaning "to warm", to the Latin tepeō and to several other Indo-European terms for heat, as well as to the similar name of the Hindu goddess Tapati and to the verb related to the latter's name, tapayati, meaning "burns" and "is hot", and to the Sanskrit term tápas, which denotes the cosmic warmth and the original nature, that is the cosmic principle out of which originated the multiple elements of the Universe and the order in the world.

== History ==
The connections of her name to fire and warmth, as well as her role as the primeval fire attest of the role of Tabiti as a primordial sovereign deity of fire derived from the common fire-deity of the Indo-Europeans, whose iterations included the Greek Hestia, and the Vedic Agni among the Indo-Aryans, and Atar among the more southern Iranian peoples. Tabiti was thus similar to the Vedic Agni and the Greek Hestia, therefore being connected to the common Iranian cult and concept of fire, although she belonged to an older period in the development of Indo-Iranian religion compared to the other Iranian peoples and the Indo-Aryans, among whom she had been respectively replaced by the male fire-gods Ātar and Agni, making her the only attested female Indo-Iranian fire-deity.

Herodotus of Halicarnassus equates Tabiti with the Greek goddess of the hearth, Hestia, and lists Tabiti at the head of the Scythian pantheon, which might be a reflection of the role of the fire-deity among the Indo-European peoples, and parallels the Greek tradition of beginning and ending every sacrificial rite with the sacrifice to Hestia, and every appeal to the gods starting by mentioning her name; another parallel is found in the Indo-Aryan Rigveda, which begins and ends with a hymn addressed to Agni; thus, the supreme position of Tabiti in the list of Scythian gods reflected her position in hymns to the gods pronounced during Scythian sacrifices and rituals.

== Cult ==
=== Functions ===
Tabiti was the primordial fire which alone existed before the creation of the universe and was the basic essence and the source of all creation, and from her were born Api (the Earth) and Papaios (Heaven). This attests of the paramount role of the fire-deity in the Iranian pantheon as an omnipresent element, and was a concept which was also present among the Indo-Aryan pantheon, where Agni was the fire which could be found throughout the Cosmos and which permeated the whole Universe, including the worlds of the humans and of the gods.

According to the Scythologist Dmitry Raevsky, the status of Tabiti as the incarnation of the primordial fire is confirmed by a story recounted by Gnaeus Pompeius Trogus, in which a dispute arose between the Scythians and the Egyptians over which of them was the most ancient people, and which consisted of an argument by each side about whether the world was initially fully flooded by water or covered with fire, which Raevsky considered to respectively be references to Nun and Tabiti.

As a goddess of the Hearth, Tabiti was the patron of society, the state, and families. She protected the family and the clan, and as a symbol of supreme authority she was assigned the superior position over the other gods, through her role as the guardian of the king. Due to her link to the common Iranian cult of fire, she was connected to the importance of fire and of royal hearths in Iranian religions. The king's hearth was hence connected with Tabiti, and was therefore an inviolable symbol of the prosperity of his people and a token of royal power, and Tabiti herself was connected with royal power, as attested by the Scythian king Idanthyrsos calling her the "Queen of the Scythians" in 513 BCE, with this characterisation of Tabiti being possibly linked to the notion of the khvarenah (Avestan: 𐬓𐬀𐬭𐬆𐬥𐬀𐬵, romanized: x^{v}ar^{ə}nah), the Iranian divine bliss, or even to that of the fire which protects the king, the Warahrān (Middle Persian: 𐭥𐭫𐭧𐭫𐭠𐭭). As the guardian of the royal hearth, Tabiti therefore ensured the well-being of the tribe - an oath by the royal hearths was considered the most sacred and breaking it was believed to cause the king's illness and was punished by the execution of the perpetrator of the crime, who was tied to brushwood and burnt.

=== The hearths of Tabiti ===
The "hearths" (Ancient Greek: ἑστίαι, romanized: hestíai) of Tabiti were likely the flaming gold objects which fell from the sky in the Scythian genealogical myth and of which the Scythian king was the trustee while Tabiti herself in turn was the protector of the king and the royal hearth, thus creating a strong bond between Tabiti and the Scythian king, who might have been seen as an intermediary between the goddess and the people, with any offence to the royal hestiai being considered as affecting the whole tribe and as having to be averted at any cost.

=== Iconography ===
Due to being a deity representing an abstract notion of fire and divine bliss, Tabiti was not depicted in Scythian art, but was instead represented by the fireplace, which constituted the sacral centre of any community, from the family to the tribe.

== See also ==
- Scythian religion

== Sources ==
- Bukharin, Mikhail Dmitrievich [in Russian] (2013). "Колаксай и его братья (античная традиция о происхождении царской власти у скифов" [Kolaxais and his Brothers (Classical Tradition on the Origin of the Royal Power of the Scythians)]. Аристей: вестник классической филологии и античной истории (in Russian). 8: 20–80.
- Cheung, Johnny (2007). Etymological Dictionary of the Iranian Verb. Leiden, Netherlands: Brill Publishers. ISBN 978-9-004-15496-4.
- Cunliffe, Barry (2019). The Scythians: Nomad Warriors of the Steppe. Oxford, United Kingdom; New York City, United States: Oxford University Press. ISBN 978-0-198-82012-3.
- Harmatta, János (1996). "10.4.1. The Scythians". In Hermann, Joachim; Zürcher, Erik; Harmatta, János; Litvak, J. K.; Lonis, R. [in French]; Obenga, T.; Thapar, R.; Zhou, Yiliang (eds.). From the Seventh Century B.C. to the Seventh Century A.D. History of Humanity. Vol. 3. London, United Kingdom; New York City, United States; Paris, France: Routledge; UNESCO. ISBN 978-9-231-02812-0.
- Jones, Lindsay; Carrasco, David; Casadio, Giovanni; Doniger, Wendy; Ebersole, Gary L.; Gyatso, Janet; Hallisey, Charles; Long, Charles H.; MacDonald, Mary N.; Martin, Dale B.; Nanji, Azim; Olupona, Jacob; Swartz, Michael; Talamantez, Inés, eds. (2005). "Scythian Religion". Encyclopedia of Religion. Vol. 12. Farmington Hills, United States: Macmillan Reference USA. pp. 8205–8208. ISBN 978-0-028-65733-2.
- MacLeod, Sharon (2013). The Divine Feminine in Ancient Europe: Goddesses, Sacred Women and the Origins of Western Culture. McFarland. ISBN 978-1-476-61392-5.
- Parzinger, Hermann (2004). Die Skythen [The Scythians] (in German). Munich, Germany: Verlag C.H.Beck. ISBN 978-3-406-50842-4.
- Raevskiy, Dmitriy (1993). Marazov, Ivan (ed.). Scythian Mythology. Sofia, Bulgaria: Secor Publishers. ISBN 978-9-548-25002-3.
- Safaee, Yazdan (2020). "Scythian and Zoroastrian Earth Goddesses: A Comparative Study on Api and Ārmaiti". In Niknami, Kamal-Aldin; Hozhabri, Ali (eds.). Archaeology of Iran in the Historical Period. University of Tehran Science and Humanities Series. Cham, Germany: Springer International Publishing. pp. 65–75. doi:10.1007/978-3-030-41776-5_6. ISBN 978-3-030-41776-5. S2CID 219515548.
- Ustinova, Yulia (1999). The Supreme Gods of the Bosporan Kingdom: Celestial Aphrodite and the Most High God. Leiden, Netherlands; Boston, United States: Brill Publishers. ISBN 978-9-004-11231-5.
- West, Martin Litchfield (2007). Indo-European Poetry and Myth. Oxford, United Kingdom: Oxford University Press. ISBN 978-0-199-28075-9.
