= Savarni Manu =

Eighth Manu in Hindu mythology

- Affiliation: Manu
- Predecessor: Vaivasvata Manu
- Successor: Daksha Savarni
- Texts: Puranas, Mahabharata

Genealogy
- Parents: Surya (father), Chhaya (mother) Saranyu (step-mother)
- Siblings: Vaivasvata Manu (half-brother); Tapati (sister); Shani (brother)
- Children: Nirmoka, Sushena, Virojaksha

Savarni Manu (Sanskrit: सावर्णिमनु, romanized: Sāvarṇimanu) is the eighth Manu, the first man of an age known as the Manvantara in Hindu mythology.

== Literature ==
The Vishnu Purana specifies fourteen Manus. The Manu of the present age is called Vaivasvata Manu, the seventh man to hold the title. He is to be succeeded by his half-brother Sarvabhauma, who would be called the Savarani Manu. The eighth Manu is described to be born to Surya, the god of the sun, and Chhaya, one of his consorts. The authorship of the Brahma Vaivarta Purana is attributed to this Manu, who narrates its contents to Narada.

According to the Srimad Bhagavatam, Savarni's sons are stated to be Nirmoka, Virojaksha, and unnamed others. During his reign, the deities of Surya and Vishnu are stated to be venerated. Bali, the son of Virochana, is described to rule as king. Galava, Diptiman, Ashvatthama, Kripa, Rishyashringa, Vadrayana, and Parashurama are named as the age's seven sages.
