= Vaivasvata Manu =

Current Manu of Hinduism

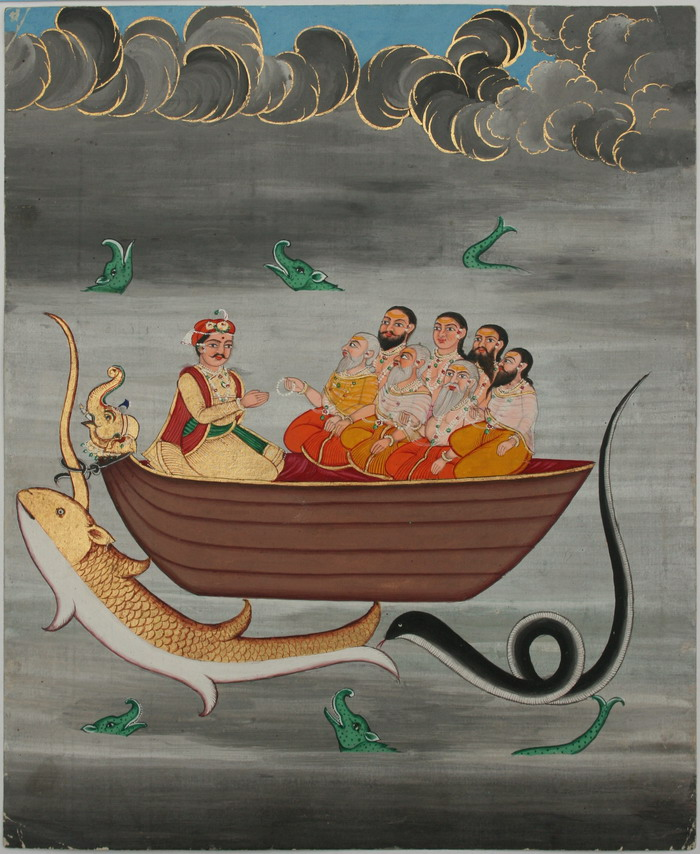
- Matsya helps Vaivasvata Manu and the Seven Sages escape from the divine deluge.
- Predecessor: Chakshusha Manu
- Successor: Savarni Manu

Genealogy
- Parents: Vivasvan (father); Saranyu (mother)
- Spouse: Shraddha
- Children: Ikshvaku, Dhrishta, Narishyanta, Dishta, Nriga, Karusha, Saryati, Nabhaga, Pranshu, Prisadhra; Ila

Vaivasvata Manu (Sanskrit: वैवस्वत मनु), also referred to as Shraddhadeva and Satyavrata, is the current Manu—the progenitor of the human race. He is the seventh of the 14 Manus of the current kalpa (aeon) of Hindu cosmology. In the Jain religion he is also known as Nabhiraja, the father of Rishabhanatha and the last Kulakara.

He is the son of Vivasvan (also known as Surya), the Sun god, and his wife Saranyu. Forewarned about the divine flood by the Matsya avatara of Vishnu, Manu saved mankind by building a boat that carried his family and the Saptarishi (the Seven Sages) to safety. He was one of the wielders of Asi the primordial sword.

== Ancestry ==
According to the Puranas, the genealogy of Shraddhadeva is as follows:

1. Brahma.
2. Marichi, one of the 10 Prajapatis created by Brahma.
3. Kashyapa, the son of Marichi and his thirteen wives, among which Kala is prominent. Kashyapa is regarded as one of the progenitors of humanity.
4. Vivasvat or Surya, the son of Kashyapa and Aditi.
5. Vaivasvata Manu, the son of Vivasvat and Saranyu (Saṃjñā). He is also known as Satyavrata and Shraddhadeva.

== Legend ==
Shraddhadeva is stated to be the king of the Dravida kingdom during the epoch of the Matsya Purana. According to the Matsya Purana, Matsya, the avatara of Vishnu, first appeared as a shaphari (a small carp) to Shraddhadeva while he washed his hands in a river flowing down the Malaya Mountains.

The little fish asked the king to save him, and out of compassion, he put it in a water jar. It kept growing bigger and bigger, until the king first put it in a bigger pitcher, and then deposited it in a well. When the well also proved insufficient for the ever-growing fish, the king placed it in a tank (reservoir), that was two yojanas (16 miles) in height above the surface and on land, as much in length, and a yojana (8 miles) in breadth. As it grew further, the king had to put the fish in a river, and when even the river proved insufficient, he placed it in the ocean, after which it nearly filled the vast expanse of the great ocean.

It was then that Vishnu, revealing himself, informed the king of an all-destructive deluge which would be coming very soon. The king built a huge boat which housed his family, the Seven Sages, nine types of seeds, and animals to repopulate the earth after the deluge would end and the oceans and seas would recede. At the time of deluge, Vishnu appeared as a horned fish and Shesha appeared as a rope, with which the king fastened the boat to the horn of the fish.

The boat was perched, after the deluge, on the top of the highest peak of Himavat called Naubandhana. After the deluge, Manu's family and the seven sages repopulated the earth. According to the Puranas, Manu's story occurs before the 28 chaturyugas in the present Manvantara which is the 7th Manvantara. This amounts to 120 million years ago. A genealogical list in the Adi Parva of the Mahabharata lists 43 generations (inclusive) between Manu and the hero Arjuna (who, according to different traditions, lived somewhere between 3200 and 1000 BC).

This narrative is similar to other flood myths like the Gilgamesh flood myth and the Genesis flood narrative.

== Descendants ==
Shraddhadeva married Shraddha and had ten children including Ila and Ikshvaku, the progenitors of the Lunar and Solar dynasties, respectively.

The Mahabharata states:

And Manu was endowed with great wisdom and devoted to virtue. And he became the progenitor of a line. And in Manu's race have been born all human beings, who have, therefore, been called Manavas. And it is of Manu that all men including Brahmanas, Kshatriyas, Vaishyas, Sudras, and others have been descended, and are therefore all called Manavas. Subsequently, the Brahmanas became united with the Kshatriyas. And those sons of Manu that were Brahmanas devoted themselves to the study of the Vedas. And Manu begot ten other children named Ikshvaku, Dhrishta, Narishyanta, Dishta, Nriga, Karusha, Saryati, Nabhaga, Pranshu, Prisadhra and a daughter Ila. They all betook themselves to the practices of Kshatriyas (warriors). Besides these, Manu had fifty other sons on Earth. But we heard that they all perished, quarrelling with one another.

== Theosophy ==
In Theosophy, the "Vaivasvata Manu" is one of the most important beings at the highest level of Initiation of the ancient Vedic sages, along with Maitreya, and the Maha Chohan. According to Theosophy, each root race has its own Manu who physically incarnates in an advanced body of an individual of the old root race and physically progenerates with a suitable female partner the first individuals of the new root race.
