= List of Daksha's daughters =

Daughters of Daksha in Hindu mythology

In Hinduism, Daksha is a Prajapati, and the son of the creator god Brahma. Hindu literature identifies both Asikni and Prasuti as the name of Daksha's wife. Some of the notable daughters of Daksha include Aditi, the mother of the adityas, Diti, the mother of the daityas, Danu, the mother of the danavas, Svaha, the goddess of sacrifices and the wife of Agni, and Sati, the first wife of Shiva.

Daksha's daughters have an important role in creation, as they were given in marriage by their father to a number of deities in Hindu mythology. In the Mahabharata, the sixteen daughters of Daksha become the mothers of all living beings, including the devas, the asuras, and humans.

== List ==
=== Daughters of Virini ===
The Adiparva and Harivamsa state that Daksha had 60 daughters from his wife Virini (later also called Asikni) who like himself, was born out of Brahma. Their names and progeny are

Name	Husband	Children	Important descendants
Aditi	Kashyapa	12 Adityas, notably Surya and Indra	Solar dynasty, Lunar dynasty (through Ila), Yama, Yamuna, Tapti, Shani, Ashvins, Revanta, Devayani (through Indra's daughter Jayanti)
Diti	Kashyapa	2 sons - Hiranyaksha and Hiranyakshashipu	Daityas, Prahlada, Virochana, Bali, Bana, Usha,Sunda and Upasunda, Nivatakavachas
Diti	Kashyapa	A daughter - Simhika	Rahu and other Asuras like llvala and Vatapi
Diti	Kashyapa	Aborted fetus	49 Maruts
Danu	Kashyapa	40 sons, notably Vrishaparva, Viprachitti, Sambara, Puloma & Namuchi	Danavas, Sharmistha, Shachi,
Simhika	Kashyapa	Rahu and 3 other sons	Saimhikeya Asuras
Kala	Kashyapa	4 sons	Kalakeya Asuras
Krodha	Kashyapa	7 daughters - Mrigi, Mrigamanda, Hari, Bhadramana, Matangi, Sharduli and Surabhi	Deer (from Mrigi) Bears (from Mrigamanda) Monkeys & horses (from Hari) Diggajas like Airavata (from Bhadramana) Elephants (from Matangi) Big cats (from Sharduli) Fruit-bearing trees (from Surabhi's daughter Anala) Cattle (from Surabhi's daughter Rohini) Horses (from Surabhi's daughter Gandharvi)
Danayu	Kashyapa	Thousands of Asuras	
Vinata	Kashyapa	2 sons - Garuda and Aruna	Eagles (from Aruna), notably Jatayu and Sampati
Kadru	Kashyapa	Many Nagas, notably Ananta, Vasuki, Takshaka and Karkotaka	Snakes
Muni	Kashyapa	Gandharvas	
Pradha	Kashyapa	Gandharvas like Tumburu	
	Kashyapa	Apsaras, notably Rambha, Tilottama and Ghritachi	Shakuntala
Kapila/Surabhi	Kashyapa	Cattle	
Kapila/Surabhi	Kashyapa	11 Rudras	
Tamra	Kashyapa	8 daughters - Kaki, Syeni, Uluki, Ghridhri, Bhasi, Dhritarastri, Suki & Sugrivi	Crows (from Kaki) Eagles, notably Jatayu and Sampati (from Syeni) Owls (from Uluki) Vultures (from Ghridhri) Fowls (from Bhasi) Ducks, geese and aquatic birds (from Dhritarastri) Parrots (from Suki) Donkeys, camels and horses (from Sugrivi)
Ira	Kashyapa	Woody trees and grasses	
Khasa	Kashyapa	Yakshas and Rakshasas	
Surasa	Kashyapa	Flying snakes & herons	
Arundhati	Dharma (personification of Dharma)	Herbs	
Vishva	Dharma (personification of Dharma)	Visvedevas	-
Sadhya	Dharma (personification of Dharma)	Sadhyas	-
Vasu	Dharma (personification of Dharma)	Vasus, notably Vayu, Varuna and Agni	Varuni (from Varuna) Shakha, Vishakha & Naigamesha (from Agni), Personification of light (from Soma) Kala or personification of time (from Dhruva), Devala (from Pratyusha) Vishwakarma (from Prabhasa)
Marudvati	Dharma (personification of Dharma)	Winds	-
Muhurta	Dharma (personification of Dharma)	Muhurtas (personification of muhurtas)	-
Lamba	Dharma (personification of Dharma)	Ghosa (personification of sound)	-
Bhanu	Dharma (personification of Dharma)	Bhanavas	-
Yami	Dharma (personification of Dharma)	Nagavithi (personification of planetary orbits)	-
Samkalpa	Dharma (personification of Dharma)	Samkalpa (personification of resolution)	-
27 daughters who are personifications of nakshatras	Chandra	Varchas (through Rohini) who later reincarnated as Abhimanyu	-
2 daughters	Krishashva	Personifications of astras	-
2 daughters	Bahuputra	Personifications of lightning, thunder, clouds and rainbow	-
2 daughters	Pratyangiras	Personifications of mantras	-
4 daughters	Aristanemi	16 sons	-

=== Daughters of Prasuti ===
The Puranas later tell that Daksha married Prasuti, the daughter of Swayambhuva Manu and Shatarupa, sister of Devahuti (mother of Kapila) and Uttanapada (father of Dhruva). With her, he had 24 daughters. They are

Name	Husband	Children	Important descendants
Sati	Shiva	-	-
Khyati	Bhrigu	Shukra, Chyavana, Dhata, Vidhata, Lakshmi	Brahmins of Bhargava gotra, Markandeya, Jamadagni, Parashurama
Svadha	Pitris	7 daughters - Mena, who married Himavan Dharani, who married Meru Acchoda, who became a river and reincarnated as Satyavati Pivari, who married Shuka Viraja, who married Nahusha Yashoda, who married into the Solar dynasty Narmada, who married Purukutsa	Mainaka, Krauncha, Ekaparna (wife of Devala), Ekapatala (wife of Jaigishavya) Ganga, Parvati (through Mena) Mandara (through Dharani) Markandeya (through Dharani's daughters) Yayati (through Viraja) Dilipa (through Yashoda) Trasadasyu (through Narmada)
Swaha	Agni	3 sons - Pavaka, Pavamana and Shuchi	Various types of fires
Sambhuti	Marichi	Kaashyapa	Brahmanas of Kasshyapa gotra
Smriti	Angiras	3 sons, Brihaspati, Utathya, Samvarta and daughters - Kuhu, Raka, Sinivali and Anumati	Brahmins of Angirasa gotra, Bharadvaja & Kacha (from Brihaspati)
Anasuya	Atri	5 sons, in addition to Durvasa and Dattatreya	Brahmins of Atreya gotra
Priti	Pulastya	Vishrava and Dattoli (reincarnation of Agastya)	Kubera, Ravana, Vibhishana and Kumbhakarna(from Vishrava)
Kshama	Pulaha	3 sons	-
Sannati	Kratu	Valakhilyas	-
Urja	Vasistha	7 sons	Brahmins of Vasistha gotra
Chitti	Atharvan	Dadhichi	Brahmins of Atharvan gotra, Pippalada
Sraddha (personification of faith)	Dharma (personification of Dharma)	Subha (personification of auspiciousness)	-
Maitri (personification of friendship)	Dharma (personification of Dharma)	Prasada (personification of grace)	-
Daya (personification of kindness)	Dharma (personification of Dharma)	Abhaya (personification of fearlessness)	-
Shanti (personification of peace)	Dharma (personification of Dharma)	Sukha (personification of happiness)	-
Tusti (personification of satisfaction)	Dharma (personification of Dharma)	Moda (personification of joy)	-
Pusti (personification of nourishment)	Dharma (personification of Dharma)	Vismaya (personification of astonishment)	-
Kriya (personification of activity)	Dharma (personification of Dharma)	Yoga (personification of the concept)	-
Unnati (personification of progress)	Dharma (personification of Dharma)	Darpa (personification of pride)	-
Buddhi (personification of wit)	Dharma (personification of Dharma)	Artha	-
Medha (personification of mental power)	Dharma (personification of Dharma)	Smriti (personification of memory)	-
Titiksha (personification of perseverance)	Dharma (personification of Dharma)	Kshema (personification of security)	-
Hri (personification of modesty)	Dharma (personification of Dharma)	Prasraya (personification of support)	-
Murti	Dharma (personification of Dharma)	Nara and Narayana	Urvashi

=== Other daughters ===
Kalika Purana describes Rati as a mind-born daughter of Daksha, who is betrothed to Kamadeva.
