= Manu (Hinduism) =

Hindu concept

Manu (Sanskrit: मनु) is a term found with various meanings in Hinduism. In early texts, it refers to the archetypal man, or the first man (progenitor of humanity). The Sanskrit term for 'human', मनुष्य (IAST: manuṣya) or मानव (IAST: mānava) means 'of Manu' or 'children of Manu'.

In later texts, Manu is the title or name of fourteen rulers of earth, or alternatively as the head of dynasties that begin with each cyclic kalpa (aeon) when the universe is born anew. The title of the text Manusmriti uses this term as a prefix, but refers to the first Manu – Svayambhuva, the spiritual son of Brahma. In the Hindu cosmology, each kalpa consists of fourteen Manvantaras, and each Manvantara is headed by a different Manu.

The current universe is asserted to be ruled by the seventh Manu, named Vaivasvata. Vaivasvata was the king of Dravida before the great flood. He was warned of the flood by the Matsya (fish) avatar of Vishnu, and built a boat that carried the Vedas, Manu's family and the seven sages to safety, helped by Matsya. The tale is repeated with variations in other texts, including the Mahabharata and a few other Puranas.

== Fourteen Manus ==
There are fourteen Manus that rule in succession during each Kalpa (day of Brahma). The current Kalpa has the following Manus:

List of Manus according to Source
Manvantara	Bhagavata Purana	Brahma Purana	Linga Purana	Skanda Purana 1	Skanda Purana 2
1	Swayambhuva				
2	Svarocisha				
3	Uttama				
4	Tapasa (Tamasa)				
5	Raivata				
6	Chakshusha				
7	Vaivasvata (Sraddhadeva or Satyavrata)				
8	Savarni				
9	Daksha-savarni	Raibhya	Dharma	Brahma-savarni	Bhautya
10	Brahma-savarni	Raucya	Savarnika	Rudra-savarni	Raucya
11	Dharma-savarni	The four Merusavarnis	Pisanga	Daksa-savarni	Brahma-savarni
12	Rudra-savarni	The four Merusavarnis	Apisangabha	Dharma-savarni	Rudra-savarni
13	Deva-savarni	The four Merusavarnis	Sabala	Raucya	Meru-savarni
14	Indra-savarni	The four Merusavarnis	Varnaka	Bhautya	Daksha-savarni

=== Svayambhuva Manu ===
The first Manu was the mind-born son of the god Brahma, and the husband of Shatarupa. He had three daughters, namely Akuti, Devahuti and Prasuti. Devahuti was given in marriage to Kardama and she gave birth to nine daughters and a single son named Kapila. Prasuti gave birth to several daughters, including Sati, Khyati, Diti, Aditi, Kadru, Rohini amongst many, and Akuti gave birth to one son named Yajna and one daughter. Both Kapila and Yajna, who were sons of Devahuti and Akuti respectively, were incarnations of Vishnu.

Svayambhuva Manu, along with his wife, Satarupa, went into the forest to practice austerities on the bank of the River Sunanda. At some point in time, the Rakshasas attacked them, but Yajna, accompanied by his sons, the demigods, swiftly killed them. Yajna then personally took the post of Indra, the king of the heavenly planets.

Svayambhuva Manu's abode is Brahmavarta, with the town of Barhismati as the capital. Barhismati was formed when Vishnu in his cosmic boar form (Varaha) shook his body, causing large strands of hair to fall off of him and turn into the town. The smaller strands that fell off of him became kuśa and kāsa grass.

In this manvantara, the Saptarshis were Marichi, Atri, Angiras, Pulaha, Kratu, Pulastya, and Vashishtha, and Vishnu's avatar is Yajna.

=== Svarochisha Manu ===
The second Manu, whose name was Svarocisha, was the son of Agni, and His sons were headed by Dyumat, Sushena, and Rochishmat. He invented clothing and made it for mankind. At his deathbed, Sage Devala was born from Shiva's third eye to succeed Svarochisa Manu in making clothes for mankind. Rochana became Indra, the ruler of the heavenly planets, and there were many demigods, headed by Tushita. There were also many saintly persons, such as Urjastambha. Among them was Vedasira, whose wife, Tushita, gave birth to Vibhu, the incarnation of Vishnu for this manvantara. He remained a brahmachari all his life and never married. He instructed eighty-eight thousand dridha-vratas, or saintly persons, on sense-control and austerity.

In this manvantara, the Saptarshis are Urjastambha, Agni, Prana, Danti, Rishabha, Nischara, and Charvarivan.

=== Uttama Manu ===
Uttama, the son of Priyavrata, was the third Manu. Among his sons were Pavana, Srinjaya, and Yajnahotra. The Satyas, Devasrutas, and Bhadras became the demigods, and Satyajit became Indra. From Sunrita, the wife of Dharma, Vishnu appeared as Satyasena, and killed all the evil Rakshasas who created havoc in all the worlds, along with Satyajit.

In this manvantara, the Saptarshis are Kaukundihi, Kurundi, Dalaya, Sankha, Pravahita, Mita, and Sammita, the sons of Vashishtha.

=== Tapasa Manu ===
Tapasa, also called Tamasa, the brother of the third Manu, was the fourth Manu, and he had ten sons, including Prithu, Khyati, Nara and Ketu. During his reign, the Satyakas, Haris, Viras and others were demigods, the seven great saints were headed by Jyotirdhama, and Trisikha became Indra. Harimedha begot a son named Hari, who was the incarnation of Vishnu for this Manvantara, by his wife Harini. Hari was born to liberate the devotee Gajendra.

In this manvantara, the Saptarshis are Jyotirdhama, Prithu, Kavya, Chaitra, Agni, Vanaka, and Pivara, and Vishnu's avatar is Hari.

=== Raivata Manu ===
The fifth manu, Raivata, is the twin brother of Tamasa. His sons were headed by Arjuna, Bali and Vindhya. Among the demigods were the Bhutarayas, and among the seven brahmanas who occupied the seven planets were Hiranyaroma, Vedasira and Urdhvabahu.

In this manvantara, the Saptarshis are Hirannyaroma, Vedasrí, Urddhabahu, Vedabahu, Sudhaman, Parjanya, and Mahámuni, and Vishnu's avatar is Vaikuntha.

=== Chakshusha Manu ===
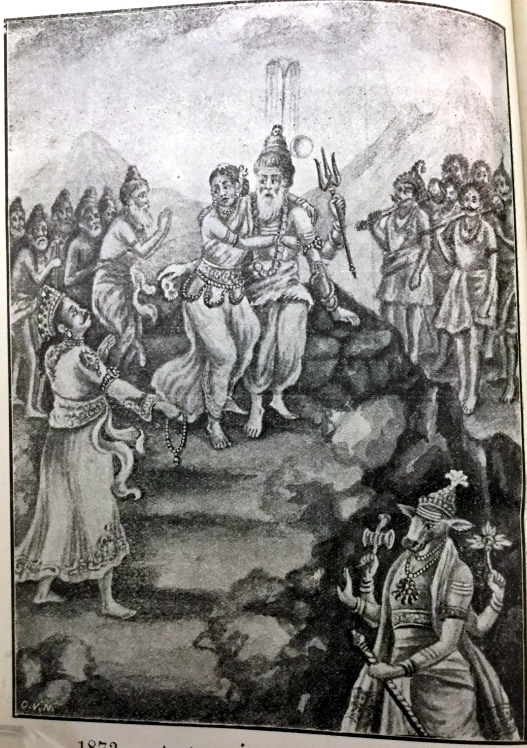
Sudyumnan sees Rudra and Parvati

The sixth Manu, Chakshusa, is the son of the demigod Chakshu. He had many sons, headed by Puru, Purusa, and Sudyumna. During his reign, the Indra was known as Mantradruma. Among the demigods were the Apyas, and among the great sages were Havisman and Viraka.

Chakshusha had a daughter named Jyothishmati, who wished for the most powerful being as her husband. When they asked Indra, the king of the gods, he replied that his own storms could be pushed away by Vayu. Vayu said that his winds could not push away the earth, and thus Bhumavat, the male personification of the earth, was stronger. Bhumavat said that Shesha, who holds both Vishnu and the earth, is the strongest. Shesha told Manu and Jyothishmati that his second avatar on earth would be stronger than himself, and thus Jyothishmati was reborn as Revati to marry that avatar, Krishna's brother Balarama.

In this manvantara, the Saptarshis are Sumedhas, Virajas, Havishmat, Uttama, Madhu, Abhináman, and Sahishnnu, and Vishnu's avatar is Ajita.

=== Vaivasvata Manu ===
The seventh Manu, who is the son of Vivasvan, is known as Sraddhadeva (or satyavrata) or Vaivasvata (son of Vivasvan). He has ten sons, named Ikshvaku, Nabhaga, Dhrsta, Saryati, Narisyanta, Dista (Nabhanedista), Tarusa (Karusha), Prsadhra, Vasuman (Pramshu) and Ila (Sudyumna). In this manvantara, or reign of Manu, among the demigods are the Adityas, Vasus, Rudras, Visvedevas, Maruts, Ashvins and Ribhus. The king of heaven, Indra, is known as Purandara, and the seven sages are known as Jamadagni, Kashyapa, Agastya, Bhrigu, Gautama, Vishvamitra, and Bharadwaja.

In this manvantara, the Saptarshis are Marichi, Agastya, Angiras, Pulaha, Kratu, Pulastya, and Bhrigu, and other like Jamadagni, Kashyapa, Gautama, Vishvamitra, Bharadvaja, and Vishnu's avatar is Matsya.

=== Suryasavarni Manu ===
In the period of the eighth Manu, the Manu is Suryasavarni Manu. He is the son of Surya by his second wife, Chhaya. He is thus the half-brother to Shraddhadeva Manu. His sons are headed by Nirmoka, and among the demigods are the Sutapas. Bali, the son of Virochana, is Indra, and Galava and Parasurama are among the seven sages. In the age of this Manu, Vishnu's avatar will be Sarvabhauma, the son of Devaguhya.

In this manvantara, the Saptarshis are Diptimat, Galava, Parasurama, Kripa, Drauni or Ashwatthama, Vyasa, and Rishyasringa, and Vishnu's avatar will be Sarvabhauma.

=== Dakshasavarni Manu ===
The ninth Manu is Dakshasavarni. He is the son of Varuna. His sons are headed by Bhutaketu, and among the demigods are the Maricigarbhas. Adbhuta is Indra, and among the seven sages is Dyutiman. Rishabha would be born of Ayushman and Ambudhara.

In this manvantara, the Saptarshis are Savana, Dyutimat, Bhavya, Vasu, Medhatithi, Jyotishmán, and Satya, and Vishnu's avatar will be Rishabha.

=== Brahmasavarni Manu ===
In the period of the tenth Manu, the Manu is Brahmasavarni. He is the son of Upsaloka, who is himself the son of Kartikeya. Among his sons is Bhurishena, and the seven sages are Havishman and others. Among the demigods are the Suvasanas, and Sambhu is Indra. Vishvaksena would be a friend of Sambhu and will be born from the womb of Vishuci in the house of a brahmana named Visvasrashta.

In this manvantara, the Saptarshis are Havishmán, Sukriti, Satya, Apámmúrtti, Nábhága, Apratimaujas, and Satyaketu, and Vishnu's avatar will be Vishvaksena.

=== Dharmasavarni Manu ===
In the period of the eleventh Manu, the Manu is Dharmasavarni, the son of the Satya Yuga. He has ten sons, headed by Satyadharma. Among the demigods are the Vihangamas, Indra is known as Vaidhrita, and the seven sages are Aruna and others. Dharmasetu will be born of Vaidhrita and Aryaka.

In this manvantara, the Saptarshis are Niśchara, Agnitejas, Vapushmán, Vishńu, Áruni, Havishmán, and Anagha, and Vishnu's avatar will be Dharmasetu.

=== Rudrasavarni Manu ===
In the period of the twelfth Manu, the Manu is Rudrasavarni, whose sons are headed by Devavan. The demigods are the Haritas and others, Indra is Ritadhama, and the seven sages are Tapomurti and others. Sudhama, or Svadhama, who will be born from the womb of Sunrita, wife of a Satyasaha.

According to Manava Purana, Rudra Savarni Manu is the son of Shiva and Parvati.

In this manvantara, the Saptarshis are Tapasví, Sutapas, Tapomúrti, Taporati, Tapodhriti, Tapodyuti, and Tapodhana, and Vishnu's avatar will be Sudhama.

=== Devasavarni Manu ===
In the period of the thirteenth Manu, the Manu is Devasavarni. Among his sons is Chitrasena, the demigods are the Sukarmas and others, Indra is Divaspati, and Nirmoka is among the sages.

In this manvantara, the Saptarshis are Nirmoha, Tattvadarshin, Nishprakampa, Nirutsuka, Dhritimat, Avyaya, and Sutapas, and Vishnu's avatar will be Yogeshvara.

=== Indrasavarni Manu ===
In the period of the fourteenth Manu, the Manu is Indrasavarni. Among his sons are Uru and Gambhira, the demigods are the Pavitras and others, Indra is Suci, and among the sages are Agni and Bahu. Brihadbhanu will be born of Satrayana from the womb of Vitana.

Almost all literature refers to the first 9 Manus with the same names but there is a lot of disagreement on names after that, although all of them agree with a total of 14.

In this manvantara, the Saptarshis are Agnibáhu, Śuchi, Śhukra, Magadhá, Gridhra, Yukta, and Ajita, and Vishnu's avatar will be Brihadbhanu.

== Bibliography ==
The texts ascribed to the Svayambhuva Manu include Manava Grihyasutra, Manava Sulbasutra and Manava Dharmashastra (Manusmṛti or "rules of Manu").

== In Buddhism ==
In Theravada Buddhist literature, Manu is remembered as an ancient archetypal monarch and lawgiver. He is given the better known epithet Mahāsammata ("the Great Elect"), the first democratically chosen king of the current cosmic aeon and a previous birth of the Bodhisatta (the future Gautama Buddha).

In the Aggañña Sutta of the Dīgha Nikāya (DN 27), the Buddha recounts the origin of kingship through a social contract: as greed and theft emerge among early human beings, they assemble and elect the most capable and virtuous individual to maintain order, administer justice, and receive a share of the rice harvest in return. Although the canonical sutta itself calls this primeval ruler Mahāsammata ("chosen by the people"), Khattiya ("lord of the fields"), and Rājā ("he who charms others by Dhamma"), later Pāli commentaries—including Buddhaghosa's Sumaṅgalavilāsinī and the commentary on the Mahāpadāna Sutta—explicitly state that this first king was also known as Manu. In the Mahāvaṃsa (Chapter II), the lineage of the Śākyan clan and Gautama Buddha is traced directly back to Mahāsammata.

Elsewhere in the Pāli Jātaka collection, Manu is referenced independently as an ancient sage and archetypal king whose pronouncements on dharma and statecraft set the standard for righteous rule:

- Kumbha Jātaka (Jātaka No. 512): In a verse condemning the evils of intoxicating liquor, the Bodhisatta (as Sakka) cites the ancient authority of Manu by name—stating that "Manu, the lord of men" (Manu manujādhipo) had long ago proclaimed that abstaining from strong drink leads to rebirth in heaven.
- Candakumāra Jātaka (Jātaka No. 542): A wicked royal chaplain justifies human and animal sacrifices by falsely claiming they represent "the ancient teachings of Manu" (Manunā bhāsitaṃ), prompting the Bodhisatta (Prince Candakumāra) to refute the priest's distortion of ancient tradition.

In Southeast Asian Theravāda legal traditions—particularly in Burma and Thailand—the figure of Manu (conceived as a wise rishi and a mentor of King Mahāsammata) became the foundational authority of Buddhist jurisprudence, giving rise to the Dhammathat (Dhammasattha) legal treatises. During the medieval period, Manusmriti is localised and re-edited in Burmese as Manu-Dhammasattha (မနုကျယ်ဓမ္မသတ်).

== In Jainism ==
Jain theology mentions the 14th patriarch named Nabhiraja, mentioning him also as Manu. This, state scholars, links Jain tradition to Hindu legends, because the 14 patriarchs in Jain tradition are similar to the 14 Manus in Hindu legends. The Manu of Jainism is the father of 1st Tirthankara Rishabhanatha (Adinatha). This ancient story is significant as it includes one of earliest mentions of ikshu (sugarcane) processing.

== See also ==
- Adam
- Proto-Indo-European religion, §Brothers
- Minos, king of Crete, son of Zeus and Europa.
- Manu and Yemo
- Mannus, progenitor of humanity in Germanic mythology according to Tacitus.
- Manes, king of Lydia
- Nu'u, Hawaiian mythological character who built an ark and escaped a Great Flood.
- Nüwa, goddess in Chinese mythology best known for creating mankind.
- Noah
- Ziusudra, hero of the Sumerian flood epic
- Atra-Hasis

== Sources ==
- Shah, Natubhai (2004) [First published in 1998], Jainism: The World of Conquerors, vol. I, Motilal Banarsidass, ISBN 81-208-1938-1
