= Mānasaputra =

Mind-born children of Brahma in Hinduism

Manasaputras (Sanskrit: मानसपुत्र, lit. 'mind-son', IAST: Mānasaputra) are a class of beings in Hinduism, referring to the 'mind-children' or the 'mind-born' sons of Brahma. In Hinduism, Brahma is believed to have created a number of children from his mind.

Sometimes, these children of the mind are stated to be identical to the Prajapatis, the progenitors of all beings in each creation. The Manasaputras are believed to have created the first man, Svayambhuva Manu, and the first woman, Shatarupa, who had five children, who went on to populate the earth.

== Lists ==
The Mahabharata lists six sages created by Brahma from his mind—Marichi, Angiras, Atri, Pulastya, Pulaha, and Kratu.

According to the Vishnu Purana, the nine manasaputras of Brahma are: Bhrigu, Pulastya, Pulaha, Kratu, Angiras, Marichi, Daksha, Atri, and Vasishtha. These sages are referred to as the Brahmarshis.

According to the Bhagavata Purana, some of the manasaputras are: Angiras, Atri, Pulastya, Marichi, Pulaha, Jambavan, Bhrigu, Vashistha, Daksha, Narada, Chitragupta, the Four Kumaras, Himavat, and Shatarupa.

== See also ==
- Atharvan
- Saptarishi
- Prajapati
- Chitragupta
- the Four Kumaras
