= Daksha =

Hindu deity

- God of ritual skill
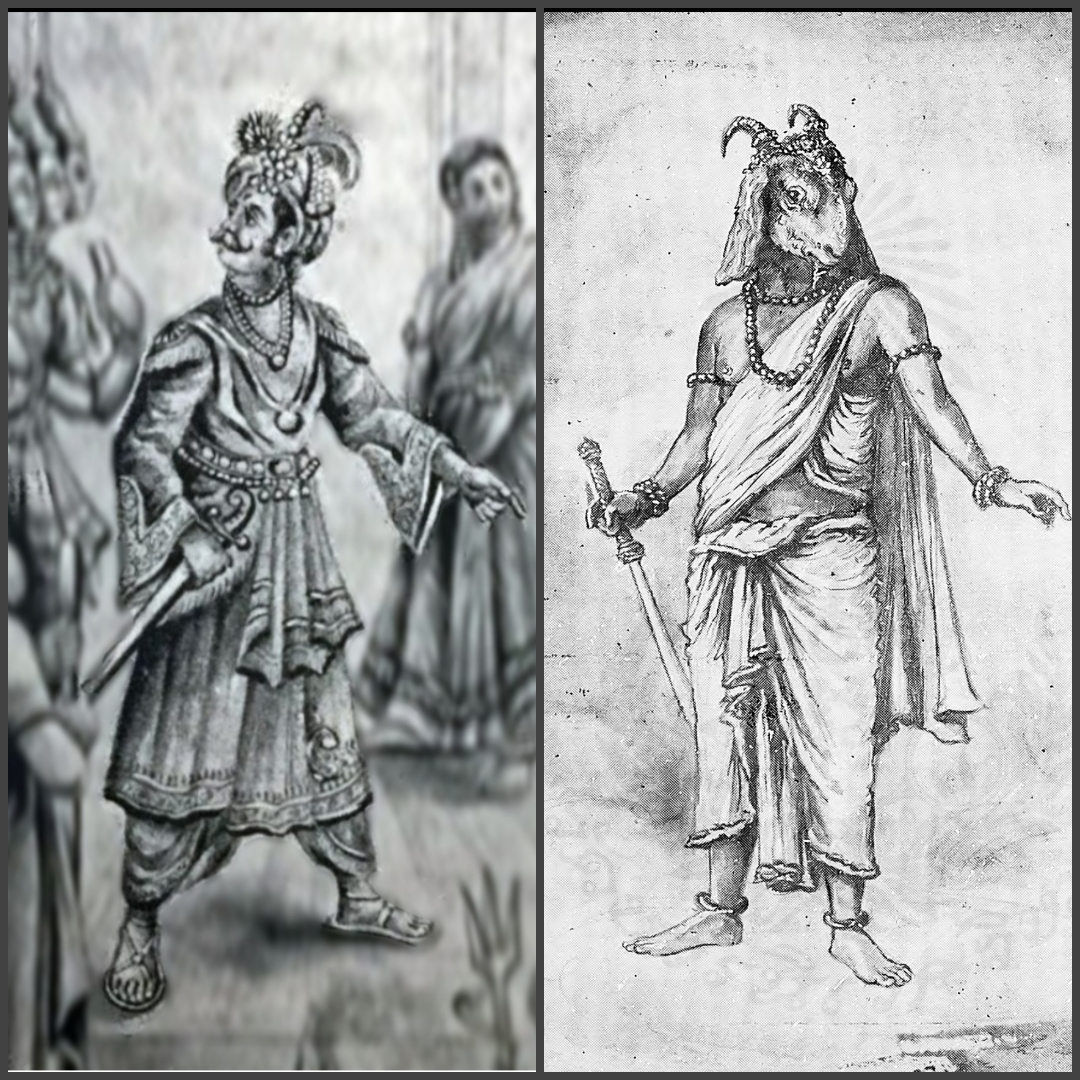
- Two depiction of Daksha in Puranic tradition — One with ordinary human features (left) and another with a goat face (right)
- Affiliation: Vedic: Adityas Itihasa-Puranic: Prajapati, Manasaputra
- Texts: Rigveda, Brahmanas, Taittiriya Samhita, Ramayana, Mahabharata, Purana

Genealogy
- Parents: Vedic: Aditi Itihasa-Puranic: Brahma (Note: The Rigveda mentions Daksha as one of the Adityas (son of goddess Aditi). According to the Puranas, Daksha was born from Brahma and later reincarnated as the son of Prachetas and Marisha.)
- Consort: Itihasa-Puranic: Prasuti and Asikni
- Children: Svaha, Khyati, Sati, Aditi, Diti, Danu, Kadru, Vinata, Rohini, Revati, Rati and other daughters; Haryashvas and Shabalashvas (sons)

Daksha (Sanskrit: दक्ष, lit. 'able, dexterous, or honest one' IAST: Dakṣa,) is a Hindu god whose role underwent a significant transformation from Vedic to Itihasa-Puranic mythology. In the Rigveda, Daksha is an aditya and is associated with priestly skills.

In the epics and Puranic scriptures, he is a son of the creator-god Brahma and one of the Prajapati, the agents of creation, as well as a divine king-rishi. He is the father of many children, who became the progenitors of various creatures. According to one legend, a resentful Daksha conducted a yajna (fire-sacrifice), and deliberately did not invite his youngest daughter Sati and her husband Shiva. In the Linga Purana, for insulting Shiva during this event, which caused Sati to self-immolate in fury, he was beheaded by Virabhadra, a fearsome form of Shiva. He was later resurrected with the head of a goat. Many Puranas state that Daksha was reborn to Prachetas in another Manvantara (age of Manu).

His iconography depicts him as a man with a stocky body and a handsome face or the head of a goat.

== Etymology and textual history ==
The meaning of the word "Daksha" (दक्ष) is "able", "expert", "skillful" or "honest". According to the Bhagavata Purana, Daksha got this name as he was expert in begetting children. The word also means "fit", "energetic" and "fire". Daksha also has another name "Kan" Or "Aja-Daksha".

Daksha finds mentions in the ancient scripture Rigveda (2nd millennium BCE), where he is described as an Aditya ('son of the goddess Aditi') and specifically associated with the skilled actions of sacrificers. Later, in the Brahmanas (900 BCE - 700 BCE), he is identified with the creator deity Prajapati. Key elements of Daksha including his yajna and ram head, which later became a key feature in the Puranic iconography, are first found in the Taittiriya Samhita version of the Yajur Veda. The epics—the Ramayana and the Mahabharata—also mention Daksha. Most of the stories about Daksha are found in the Puranas (3rd - 10th century CE).

== Legends ==
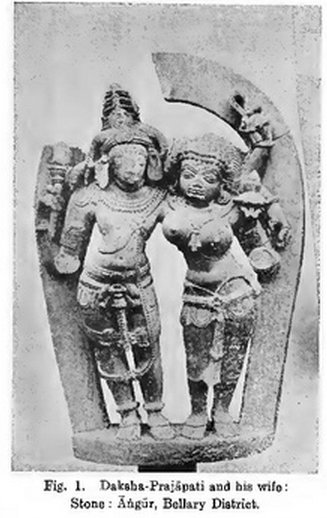
A sculpture of the goat-faced Daksha with his wife.

=== Birth ===
The epic Mahabharata describes Daksha and his wife emerging from the right and left thumbs of the Hinduism creator god Brahma respectively. According to Matsya Purana, Daksha, Dharma, Kamadeva, and Agni were born from Brahma's right thumb, chest, heart and eyebrows each. According to many texts including the Bhagavata Purana, Daksha is born twice—first as a Manasaputra (mind-created son) of Brahma and later, as a son of Prachetas and Marisha. In contrast to the later Puranic myths, the Rig Veda states that Daksha and the goddess Aditi emerge from one another, thus he is both her son and father.

=== Consorts and children ===
According to many Puranic scriptures, Daksha married Prasuti in his first birth and Asikni in his second birth. Prasuti is described to be a daughter of Svayambhuva Manu, with whom Daksha had 16, 27 or 60 daughters. Asikni (also referred to as Panchajani and Virani) is the daughter of another Prajapati named Virana (or Panchajana). Daksha was delegated by Brahma to inhabit the world; he went on to create Gods, Sages, Asuras, Yakshas and Rakhashas from the mind but failed to be further successful. (Note: Brahmanda Purana and Vayu Purana give a longer list of creations inc. plants, human beings, ghosts, serpents, deer, flesh-eating demons, and birds. Va. P. also mentions that Mahadeva had rebuked him, after the mind-created species failed to propagate.) Upon a successful penance at the Vindhyas, the god Vishnu granted Asikni as his wife and urged him to engage in sexual union.

==== Sons ====
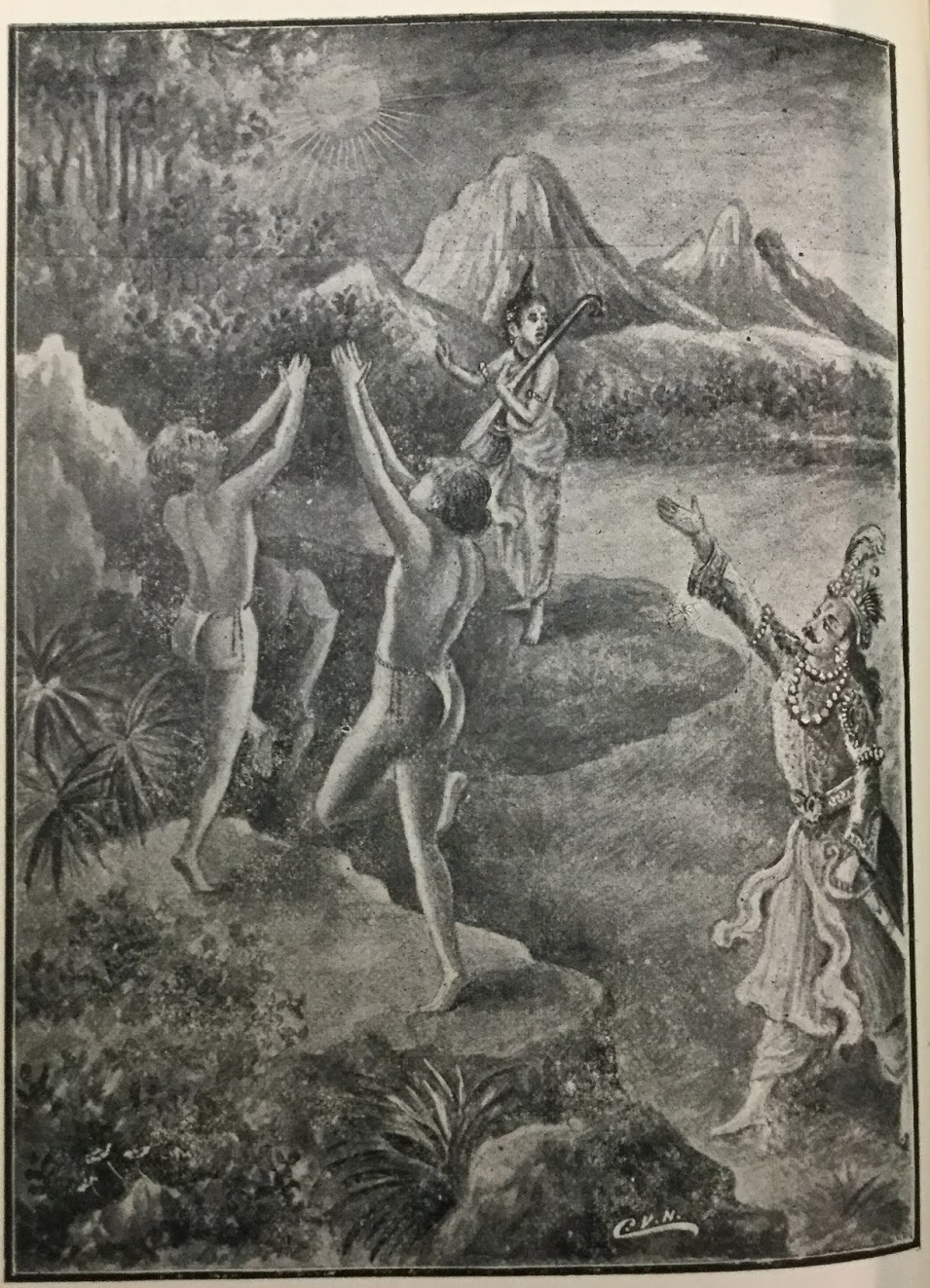
Daksha (right) cursing Narada, an illustration from a 20th-century book.

According to the Puranas, Daksha and Asikni first produced five thousand sons, who were known as Haryashvas. They were interested in populating the Earth but upon the advice of Narada, took to discovering worldly affairs instead and never returned. Brahma to have consoled a grievous Daksa after this loss. Daksha and Asikni again produced another thousand sons (Shabalashvas), who had similar intentions but were persuaded by Narada to the same results. An angry Daksha cursed Narada to be a perpetual wanderer.

==== Daughters ====
The Puranic scriptures differ in the number of Daksha's daughters. They were married to different deities, sages and kings, and became the progenitors of various kinds of creatures.

According to the Mahabharata (Harivamsa), the Devi Bhagavata Purana, Brahma Vaivarta Purana and the Vishnu Purana, Daksha fathered 60 daughters from Asikni:

- 10 of those daughters—Maruvati, Vasu, Jami, Lamba, Bhanu, Urjja, Sankalp, Mahurath, Sadhya, Vishva—were married to Dharmadeva, the god of Dharma
- 13 daughters—Aditi, Diti, Danu, Kashtha, Arishta, Surasa, Surabhi, Tamra, Krodhavasha, Sarama, Timi, Ira, Muni—were married to sage Kashyapa
- 27 daughters—Ashvini, Bharani, Krttika, Rohini, Mrigashira, Tarakam or Ardra, Punarvasu, Pushya, Ashlesha, Janakam or Magha, Phalguni, Uttarphalguni, Hasta, Chitra, Svati, Vishakha, Anuradha, Jyestha, Mula, Purvashadha, Uttarasadha, Srona or Shravana, Dhanistha or Shatabhisha, Abhijit or Prachetas, Purvabhadrapada, Uttarabhadrapada and Revati—were married to Chandra, the god of the Moon and vegetation
- 4 were married to sage Arishtanemi(Taksharya Kashyap)-Vinata, Kadru, Patangi, Yamini
- 2 were married to sage Bahuputra
- 2 married sage Angiras
- 2 were married to Krisasva

The number of Daksha's daughters from Prasuti varies—24 daughters are mentioned in the Vishnu Purana, while the Linga Purana and Padma Purana list 60 daughters. All of Prasuti's daughters represent the virtues of mind and body. The names of these daughters and their spouse, according to the Vishnu Purana, are:

- Sraddha, Lakshmi, Dhriti, Thushti, Pushti, Medha, Kriya, Buddhi, Lajja, Vapu, Shanti, Siddhi and Kirti married the god Dharmadeva
- Khyati married sage Bhrigu
- Sambhuti married sage Marichi
- Smriti married sage Angiras
- Priti married sage Pulastya
- Kshama married to sage Pulaha
- Sannati married sage Kratu
- Anasuya married sage Atri
- Urjja married sage Vashishtha
- Svaha married Agni, the god of fire
- Svadha married Kavi, a member of the class of Pitrs
- Sati married Shiva

Along with these daughters, the goddess of love, Rati, is also considered an offspring of Daksha. The Shiva Purana and Kalika Purana narrate that she emerged from the sweat of Daksha after he was asked by Brahma to present a wife to the love god Kama.

=== Cursing Chandra ===
The Puranas portray Daksha as being responsible for the waning and waxing of the Moon. The moon god Chandra married twenty-seven daughters of Daksha, who represents the twenty-seven Nakshatras (or constellations). Among them, Chandra favoured Rohini and spent most of his time with her. The other 26 sisters became jealous and complained to their father. Daksha initially tried to persuade Chandra, but after seeing his efforts fruitless, he cursed the lunar deity to become ill and lose his brightness. Since Chandra was also the god of vegetation, the vegetation began to die. The devas pacified Daksha, and upon their request, he told Chandra that he would suffer from his illness each fortnight and recover from it gradually. This leads to the waning and waxing of the moon each month. In another version, it was the god Shiva (Sati's husband) who partially cured Chandra's illness, for which Chandra constructed the Somnath temple.

=== Daksha Yajna ===
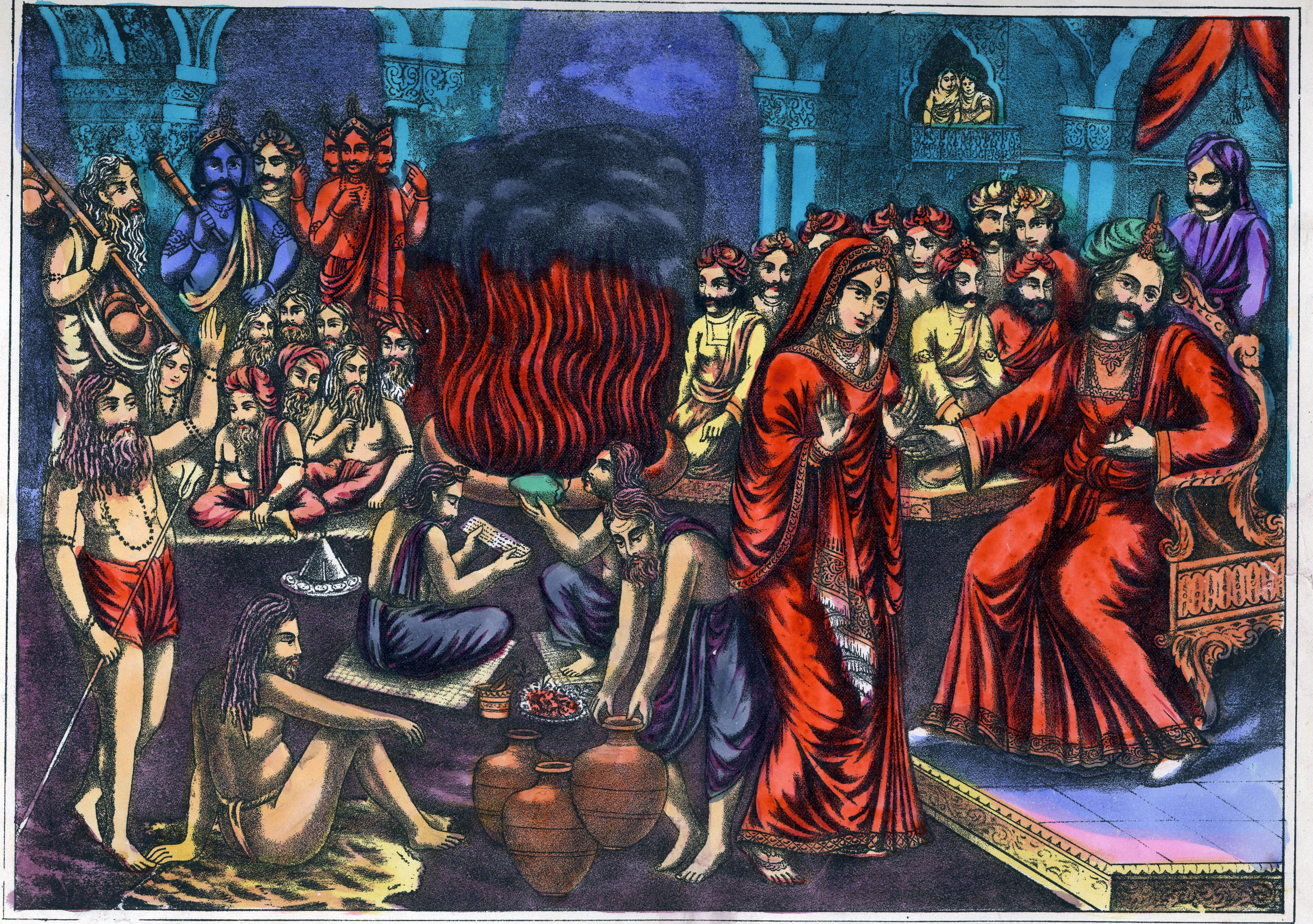
Daksha insults Shiva while arguing with Sati.

The Daksha Yajna is regarded as an important turning point in the creation and development of a number of sects in Hinduism. The story describes the circumstances that replaced Sati with Parvati as Shiva's consort and later led to the story of Ganesha and Kartikeya.

One of the daughters of Daksha, often said to be the youngest, was Sati, who had always wished to marry Shiva. Daksha forbade it, but later reluctantly allowed her and she married Shiva.

Once, Daksha organised the Brihaspatistava Yajna and intentionally did not invite Shiva and Sati. Even though discouraged by Shiva, who told her not to go to a ceremony performed by Daksha where her husband and she were not invited, the parental bond made Sati ignore social etiquette and her husband's wishes. Sati went to the ceremony alone. She was snubbed by Daksha and insulted by him in front of the guests. Sati, unable to bear further insult, ran into the sacrificial fire and immolated herself. Shiva, upon learning about the terrible incident, in his wrath invoked Virabhadra and Bhadrakali by plucking a lock of hair and thrashing it on the ground. Virabhadra and the Bhutaganas marched south and destroyed all the premises. Daksha was decapitated, and the site of the ritual was devastated during the rampage. Bhrigu, the chief priest of the Yajna, invoked the Ribhus to fight the Ganas, but the former was tied to a pillar and his beard was forcibly plucked off. According to Horace Hayman Wilson, Vahni's hands were cut, Bhaga's eyes were plucked out, Pusha had broken teeth, Yama's mace was broken, Goddesses' noses were cut, Soma was pummelled, while Yajneshwara, the Indra of Swayambhuva Manvantara, tried to escape in the form of a deer, but was decapitated. Daksha also tried to escape, but Virabhadra held him and cut off his head (some legends say that he plucked off Daksha's head with his own hands). The head was thrown to the fire, and Virabhadra returned to Kailasa, along with his hordes.

Shiva was pacified. He forgave Daksha and resurrected him, but with a goat's head. Bhrigu and the others had their parts restored. With Vishnu as the chief priest, Daksha offered a share of the oblations to Shiva, and the sacrifice was successfully completed.

== See also ==
- Prajapati
- Adityas
- Kottiyoor, Kankhal, Draksharama
- Dakshayagnam (film)
