= Haryashvas and Shabalashvas =

Hindu mythological races born to Daksha

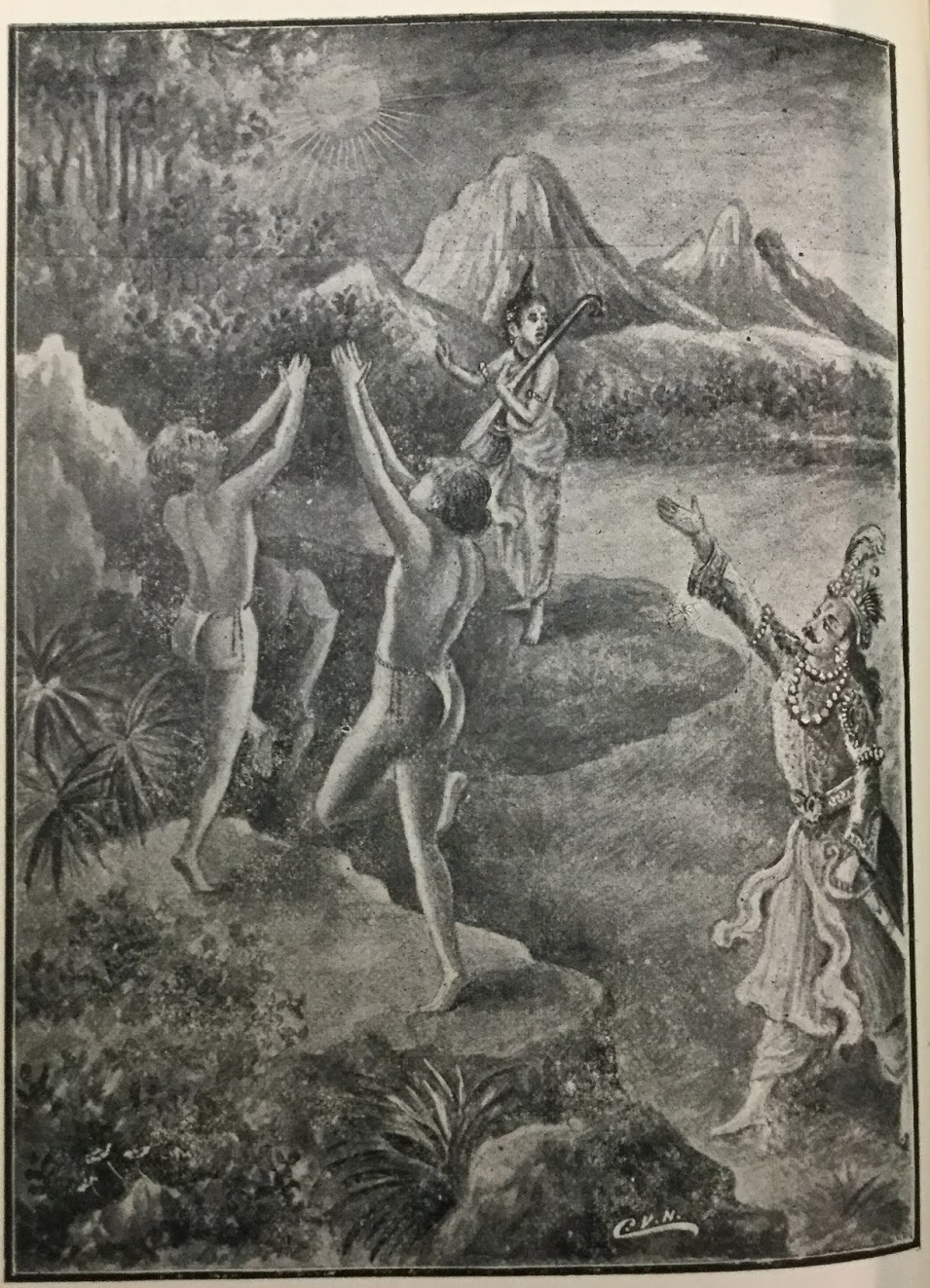
Daksha's sons engrossed in austerities while Daksha curses Narada

The Haryashvas (Sanskrit: हर्यश्व, romanized: Haryaśva) and the Shabalashvas (Sanskrit: शबलाश्व, romanized: Śabalāśva) are two races of beings in Hindu mythology sired by the Prajapati Daksha from his consort Asikni.

== Legend ==
The Mahabharata and the Puranas describe Brahma instructing Daksha to produce progeny. Daksha commenced the creation of a number of beings with his own mind. Thereupon he decided that sexual union was a more effective method of the creation of new species. He married Asikni, the daughter of the Prajapati Virana, and she gave birth to 5,000 sons called the Haryashvas. Described to possess heroic powers, the Haryashvas also desired to engage in procreation. But the sage divinity, Narada, chastised them for being childish, asking them how they intended to produce children without first learning about the surface of the earth and its circumference. He enquired if they knew about the nature of creation that they intended to produce. Warned by the sage that their ignorance could lead them to create too many or too few offspring, the Haryashvas set out in different directions to acquire this knowledge, following the path of the wind. They never returned.

Daksha begot another 1,000 sons from Asikni named the Shabalashvas, who also wished to bear progeny. Narada persuaded the Shabalashvas to also explore the boundaries of the earth, and they never returned either. Enraged, Daksha cursed Narada. He finally fathered sixty daughters from Asikni, who were given in marriage to a number of sages and deities.
