= Agneya =

Daughter of Agni in Hinduism

Agneya (Sanskrit: आग्नेयी, IAST Āgneyī, 'Daughter of Agni') is mentioned in the Harivamsha and the Vishnu Purana as the wife of Ūru (a descendant of Angiras) and the mother of the kings Anga, Sumanas, Khyati, Kratu, and Sibi (The Harivamsha includes another son, Gaya). Her father, Agni, is the Hindu god of fire.

== Etymology ==
The masculine construction of the word, Āgneya, has been used as a generic adjective meaning 'flammable', 'fiery', 'consecrated to Agni', 'ruled by Agni', etc. It has also been used as a proper noun epithet of the Agni Purana, the Āgneya Astra, and the cardinal direction of the South East (of which Agni is the Dikpala). The feminine construction Āgneyī is used only as proper noun.

== Legend ==
Āgneyī is known in ancient Vedic literature as Āgneyā where she is defined as a divine and powerful goddess. Her mother is credited to be a consort of Agni interchangeably known as Svaha and Agnāyī (meaning, "Wife of Agni").

It is also suggested that the masculine epithet Āgneya -- used to signify the Southeastern cardinal direction -- actually refers to the goddess Āgneyā. Likewise, she is also said to be the shakti of the Āgneya astra.
