= Shatarupa =

First woman in Hinduism

Genealogy
- Parents: Brahma (creator)
- Consort: Svayambhuva Manu
- Children: Priyavrata; Uttānapāda; Ākūti; Devahūti; Prasuti

Shatarupa (Sanskrit: शतरूपा, romanized: Śatarūpā, lit. 'she of a hundred forms') is the daughter of the creator deity, Brahma. According to Brahma Purana, Shatarupa is regarded as the first woman to be created by Brahma, marrying Manu, the first man. Their descendants are called manushya, the Sanskrit term for mankind.

== Literature ==
The Bhagavata Purana mentions the birth of Shatarupa, and her marriage to Manu:

"While he was thus absorbed in contemplation and was observing the supernatural power, two other forms were generated from his body. They are still celebrated as the body of Brahmā."

— Bhagavata Purana 3.12.52

"The two newly separated bodies united together in a sexual relationship."

— Bhagavata Purana 3.12.53

"Out of them, the one who had the male form became known as the Manu named Svāyambhuva, and the woman became known as Śatarūpā, the queen of the great soul Manu."

— Bhagavata Purana 3.12.52

In other texts, it is the manasaputra, the mind-born children of Brahma, who are believed to have created the first man, Svayambhuva Manu, and the first woman, Shatarupa.

Shatarupa married Svayambhuva, and the couple had five children — two sons, Priyavrata and Uttānapāda, and three daughters, Ākūti, Devahūti, and Prasuti. Manu handed over his first daughter Ākūti to the sage Ruci, the middle daughter, Devahūti, to the Prajapati Kardama, and the youngest, Prasūti, to Daksha.

== See also ==
- Manu
- Manasaputra
- Prajapati
- Eve
