= Kardama =

Hindu mythological character

- Affiliation: Prajapati
- Texts: Puranas

Genealogy
- Parents: Pulaha (father)
- Spouse: Devahuti
- Children: Kapila (son); Anasuya, Arundhati, Gati, Havirbhu, Kalā, Khyati, Kriya, Shanti, Shraddha (daughters)

Kardama (Sanskrit: कर्दम, romanized: Kardama) is a character featured in Hindu literature. A son of the creator god Brahma, Kardama is described to be a prajapati, one of the progenitors of creation. After propitiating Vishnu and seeking his counsel for a suitable wife, he marries Devahuti, one of the daughters of the first man, Manu. He becomes the father of nine daughters by her, as well as one son, the sage Kapila.

== Legend ==
According to the Bhagavata Purana, Brahma is said to have instructed his son Kardama to procreate. Kardama went to the Bindusaras ashrama located at the banks of the river Sarasvati, whereupon he commenced a tapas that lasted ten thousand years to please Vishnu. Propitiated, Vishnu appeared before Kardama, who requested the deity to grant him a wife with whom he could sire children. Vishnu promised him that two days thence, Svayambhu Manu and his wife, Shatarupa, would offer their daughter Devahuti to him for his wife. He further stated that his wife would bear him nine daughters, all of whom would marry sages, and that a portion of himself would be born to him as his son. When the marriage was proposed by the couple, Kardama agreed on the condition that he would become a renunciant after the birth of their children. Following their wedding, Devahuti served her husband with great devotion and non-attachment, to the extent that she became emaciated. When Kardama praised her qualities, she grew emboldened to remind him of his agreement to grant her children, and also asked that he arrange for a suitable dwelling.

Employing his powers accrued through yoga, Kardama created a vimana, an aerial palace capable of flying wherever he willed it. With Devahuti, he travelled the world, visiting a number of gardens and heavenly sites for their pleasure. After they returned to his ashrama, they engaged in intercourse for a hundred autumns. Kardama is described to have divided himself into nine parts as he deposited his seed within her. On the very same day, Devahuti gave birth to nine daughters: Kalā, Anasuya, Shraddha, Havirbhu, Gati, Kriya, Khyati, Arundhati, and Shanti. She grew saddened by the prospect of her husband leaving her and the fact that her daughters would have to seek worthy husbands for themselves. When she requested Kardama to grant her freedom from fear and samsara, he informed her that Vishnu would soon be born as her son, and that the deity would enlighten her in this regard.

Vishnu was born to the couple as Kapila, whose birth was accompanied by auspicious signs and miracles. Nine great sages and Brahma himself arrived to venerate Kapila. These nine sages, namely, Marici, Atri, Angiras, Pulastya, Pulaha, Kratu, Bhrigu, Vashistha, and Atharvan, called upon Kardama, who gave his daughters in marriage to them. He left Kapila in the care of Devahuti and took their leave, renouncing the world.
