= Yajna (avatar) =

Avatar of Vishnu as embodiment of sacrifice

- God of Sacrifices
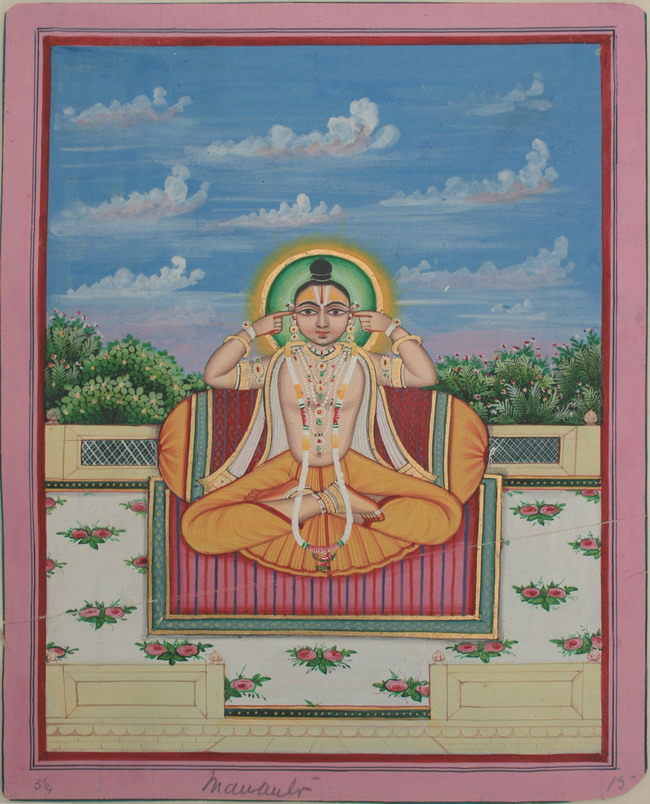
- Vishnu as Yajna
- Affiliation: Vaishnavism
- Texts: Puranas

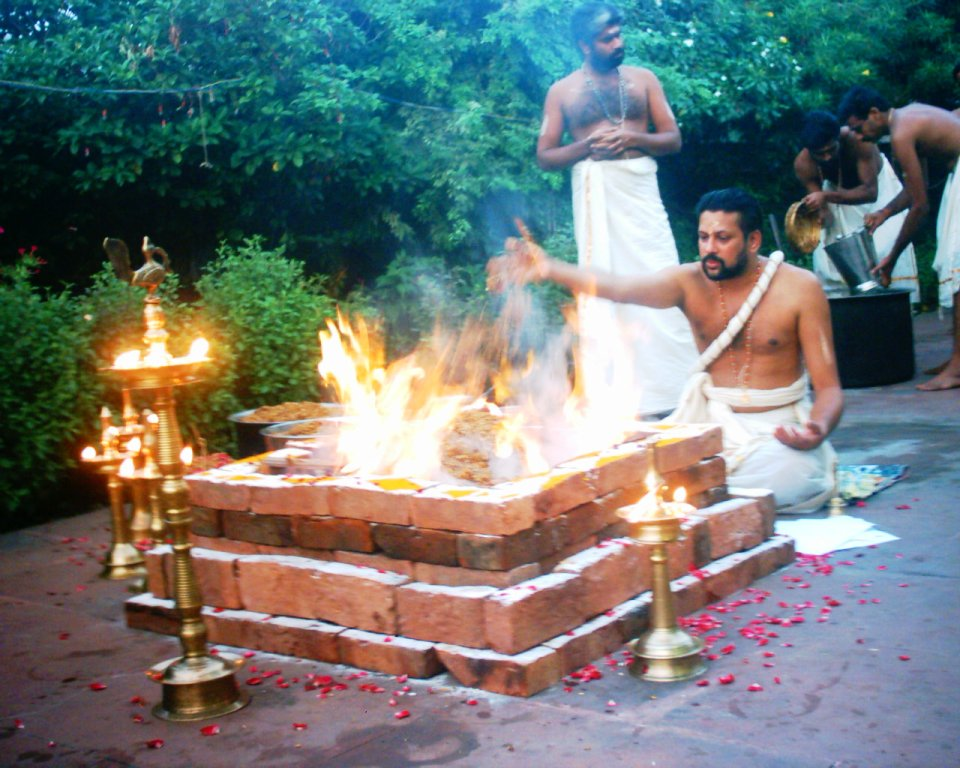
A yajna sacrifice being performed. Vishnu as Yajñeśvara is considered the deity of sacrifice.

Yajna (Sanskrit: यज्ञ, Yajña) or Yajñeśvara (Sanskrit: यज्ञेश्वर, romanized: Yajñeśvara, lit. 'God of Sacrifices') is mentioned as an avatar of the Hindu god Vishnu in Hindu literature. As Yajna, Vishnu is the embodiment of the Hindu sacrifice ritual, Yajna. He is also the Indra (king of the gods) of the Svayambhuva Manvantara, the era of Svayambhuva Manu. His father is Ruci, and his mother is Ākūti.

== Literature ==
The Bhagavata Purana, Devi Bhagavata Purana, and Garuda Purana list Yajna or Syavambhuva as an avatar of Vishnu, or Adi-Narayana. Yajna is classified as one of the 14 main Manvantara-avatars (an avatar corresponding to a Manvantara and who supports the corresponding Indra and other gods to maintain the principles of cosmic order) called vaibhava-avatars. Yajna is also categorized as a Kalpa-avatar (an avatar corresponding to an aeon called Kalpa) of Vishnu.

Yajna is the son of Prajapati Ruci and Akuti, the daughter of Svayambhuva Manu – the first Manu (progenitor of mankind). During the period of Svayambhuva Manu (Svayambhuva Manvantara), there was no qualified Indra, the post of the king of Svarga (Heaven) and the king of gods. So, Vishnu incarnated as Yajna and held the post of Indra.

The Bhagavata Purana mentions that Ruchi begot one son and one daughter by his wife, Akuti. Of the two children born of Akuti, the male child was directly an incarnation of Vishnu, and his name was Yajna, which is another name of Vishnu. The female child was a partial incarnation of Lakshmi, the goddess of fortune, the eternal consort of Vishnu. Svayambhuva Manu very gladly brought home the beautiful boy named Yajna, and Ruchi, his son-in-law, kept with him the daughter, Dakshina. Later, Yajna married Dakshina and had twelve sons. These twelve devas (gods) are collectively called the Yāmas. After Yajna's birth, he lived at the house of his grandfather Svayambhuva Manu. The sons to Yajna and Dakshina are named as Tosha, Pratosha, Santosha, Bhadra, Sânti, Idaspati, Idhma, Kavi, Vibhu, Svahna, Sudeva, and Rocana. They are collectively called as the Tushita gods. Later Yajna is described to become the Indra. The Garuda Purana says that he performed many sacrifices.

Another Shaiva tale from the Vishnu Purana tells at the time of the destruction of Daksha's sacrifice (Yajna), Yajna, the lord of sacrifice, was escaping as a deer. Yajna's head was severed by Virabhadra, a fierce incarnation of Shiva. Latter accounts in the Harivamsa and Linga Purana relate this to the origin of the constellation (Nakshatra) Mrigashīrsha ("deer-headed"). The creator god Brahma elevated the deer-headed Yajna to the planetary sphere as Mrigashīrsha.

== Association with sacrifice ==
Vishnu has been equated to Yajna ("sacrifice") as in the Vedas. The commentator on the Vedas - Sayana describes Vishnu as the lord of Yajna or the sacrificer himself. The Bhagavad Gita also associates Vishnu to Yajna (sacrifice). Performing sacrifices is considered equivalent to pleasing Vishnu. The Vishnu Sahasranama ("Thousand names of Vishnu") also relates Yajna as a name of Vishnu.
