= Prasuti =

Consort of Daksha, mother of Sati

- The queen consort of Daksha
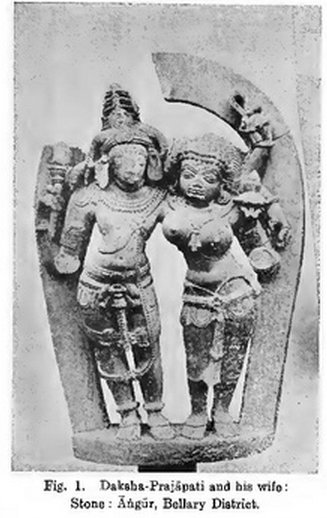
- Sculpture of Daksha and his wife Prasuti.

Genealogy
- Parents: Svayambhuva Manu (father); Shatarupa (mother)
- Consort: Daksha
- Children: Daughters including Svaha, Khyati, Sati and Smriti

Prasuti (प्रसूति, Prasūti) is the consort of Daksha and mother of many daughters by him, including the goddess Sati. Prasuti is the daughter of Svayambhuva Manu and Shatarupa.

== Marriage and children ==
According to the Vishnu Purana, the Linga Purana and the Padma Purana, Daksha and his wife Prasuti had many daughters (the numbers vary from 16 to 60, but most scholars consider it 24 — Shraddha, Bhakti, Dhriti, Thushti, Pushti, Medha, Kriya, Buddhika, Lajja Gauri, Vapu, Santi, Siddhika, Kirtti, Khyati, Sambhuti, Smriti, Priti, Kshama, Sannati, Urjja, Svaha, Svadha, and Sati. The Padma Purana records that Daksha felt that 24 daughters were not enough and produced more 60 maidens, though these sixty daughters are mentioned as the offsprings of Asikni in other texts.
