= Khyati =

Wife of Bhrigu in Hinduism

Genealogy
- Parents: Daksha (father); Prasuti (mother)
- Siblings: Aditi, Diti, Danu, Rati, Ashvini, Bharani, Krittika, Rohini, Chitra, Svati, Vishakha, Anuradha, Revati, Svaha, Svadha, Murti, Sati
- Consort: Bhrigu
- Children: Lakshmi; Dhata; Vidhata

Khyati (Sanskrit: ख्याति, romanized: Khyāti, lit. 'fame') is one of the 24 daughters of Daksha, born to his wife Prasuti. Her father is regarded to have another 62 from his wife Panchajani (Virini/Virani). One of his daughters is called Khyati, who is married to the sage Bhrigu. Khyati bears her husband two sons, Dhata and Vidhata, as well as a daughter, Lakshmi.
