= Chakshusha Manu =

Sixth Manu in Hindu mythology

- Affiliation: Manu
- Predecessor: Raivata Manu
- Successor: Vaivasvata Manu
- Texts: Puranas, Mahabharata

Genealogy
- Parents: Chakshusha (father), Pushkarini (mother)
- Spouse: Nadvala
- Children: Kuru, Puru, Shatadyumna, Tapasvi, Satyavan, Shuchi, Agnishtoma, Atiratra, Sudyumna, and Abhimanyu

Chakshusha Manu (Sanskrit: चाक्षुषमनु, romanized: Cākṣuṣamanu) is the sixth Manu, the first man of the sixth manvantara (manvantara means the era/age of the manu) in Hindu mythology.

== Literature ==
In the Markandeya Purana, Ananda, the son of sage Anamitra, is stated to be the previous incarnation of Chakshusha Manu. As a child, he was carried by a cat to the cradle of a prince, whose father was King Vikranta. Unbeknownst to the king, he was raised as his own son. During the child's sacred thread ceremony, when the king asked Ananda to prostrate before his mother, the child declared his true identity, leaving to perform a penance in the forest. Brahma appeared before Ananda and blessed him to be reborn as Chakshusha Manu in his subsequent birth.

Some texts state the true name of Chakshusha to be Ajita. The Vishnu Purana states that Chakshusha Manu married Nadvala, the daughter of Prajapati Vairaja, from whom he sired ten sons: Kuru, Puru, Shatadyumna, Tapasvi, Satyavan, Shuchi, Agnishtoma, Atiratra, Sudyumna, and Abhimanyu.
