= Pulaha =

Sage in Hinduism

Genealogy
- Parents: Brahma (father)
- Spouse: Kshama, Gati
- Children: Kardama, Kanakapeetha, Urvarivat, Peevari, Karmasreshtha, Vareeyaamsu and Sahishnu, Kimpurushas

Pulaha (Sanskrit: पुलह, romanized: Pulaha) is a character in Hindu mythology. He is the son of Brahma, the creator god, and also one of the Saptarshi (seven great sages), in the first Manvantara (age of Manu), with others being Marichi, Atri, Angiras, Kratu, Pulastya, and Vasishtha. In another classification, Pulaha is one of the ten Prajapatis, the progenitors of creation created by Brahma. The race of the kimpurushas are the children of Pulaha, according to the Mahabharata.

== Legend ==
During his birth in the first Manvantara, Pulaha was married to Daksha's daughter, Kshama. Together they had three sons, Kardama, Kanakapeetha and Urvarivat, and a daughter named Peevari. According to Bhagavata Purana, Pulaha Rishi was also married to Gati, a daughter of Kardama and Devahuti. The two had three sons – Karmasreshtha, Vareeyaamsu and Sahishnu. Pulaha is believed to be the fifth son who sprang from Brahma's head. Brahma created the Saptarishis (the seven sages) and ten Prajapatis (some accounts place it at 21), from whom all human beings are believed to have been born. Pulaha learned the power of knowledge from sage Sanandana and in turn transmitted all knowledge to sage Gautama. He performed intense penance on the banks of river Alakananda and was rewarded to be present in the court of Indra. King Bharata renounced all his kingdom and sought refuge in the hermitage of Pulaha.
