= Saptarshi =

Seven sages of Hinduism, Jainism

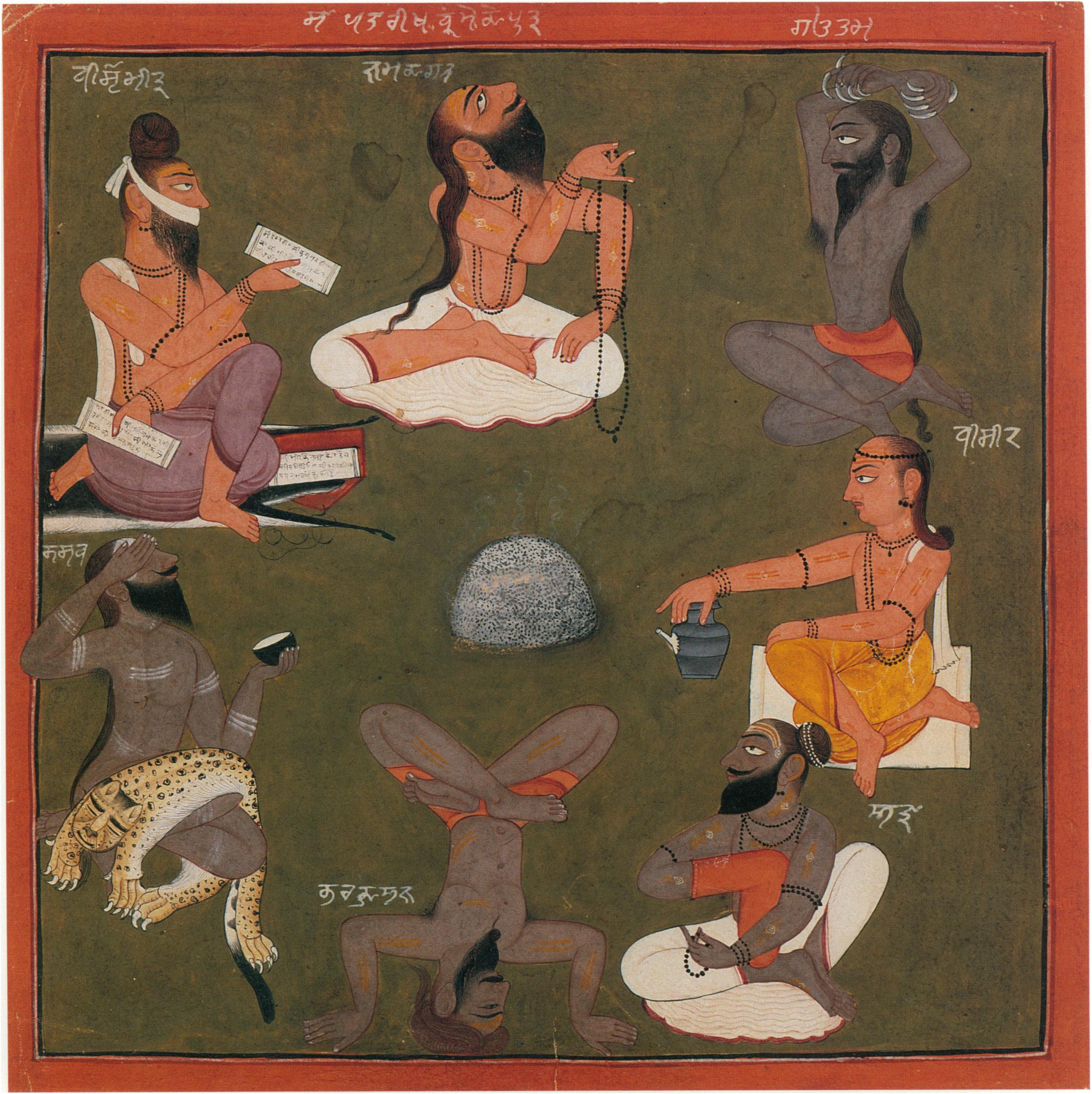
One variation of the Saptarshi: Vishvamitra (top left), Jamadagni (top centre), Gautama (top right), Vasishtha (centre right, beardless), Kashyapa (bottom left), Bharadvaja (bottom middle, in a yogic asana, upside down), Atri (bottom right). Pahari painting, from a Bandralta-Mankot workshop, c. 1700, displayed at the Government Museum and Art Gallery, Chandigarh.

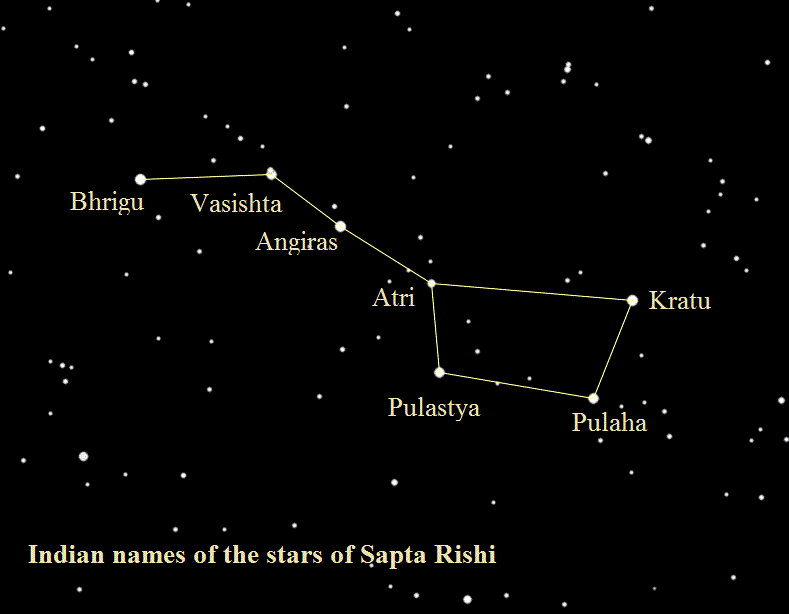
A diagram of the Big Dipper constellation, with the seven stars identified with the names of another variation of the Saptarshi, in accordance with traditional Hindu astronomy

The Saptarshi (Sanskrit: सप्तर्षि, lit. 'Seven sages' IAST: Saptarṣi) are the seven seers of ancient India who are extolled in the Vedas, and other Hindu literature such as the Skanda Purana. The Vedic Samhitas never enumerate these rishis by name, although later Vedic texts such as the Brahmanas and Upanishads do, so these constellations are easily recognizable.

== Hindu sacred text ==
An early prototype of the "Saptarishi" concept may stem from the six families associated with the six "Family Books" in the Rigveda Samhita (Mandalas 2–7 in ascending order: Gṛtsamāda, Viśvāmitra, Vāmadeva, Atri, Bharadvaja, Vasiṣṭha). While not a "Family Book", Mandala 8 is mostly attributed to Kaṇva, who could be considered the 7th prototypical Saptarishi.

The earliest formal list of the seven rishis is given by Jaiminiya Brahmana 2.218–221: Agastya, Atri, Bharadvaja, Gautama, Jamadagni, Vasishtha, and Vishvamitra. This is followed by Brihadaranyaka Upanishad 2.2.6 with a slightly different list: Atri, Bharadvaja, Gautama, Jamadagni, Kashyapa, Vasishtha, and Vishvamitra. The later Gopatha Brahmana 1.2.8 gives yet another variation: Vasistha, Vishvamitra, Jamadagni, Gautama, Bharadvaja, Gungu, Agastya, and Kashyapa.

In post-Vedic texts, different lists appear; some of these rishis were recognized as the 'mind-born sons' (Sanskrit: मानसपुत्र, manasaputra) of Brahma, the representation of the Supreme Being as Creator. Other representations of the Supreme Being are Shiva as the Destroyer and Vishnu as the Preserver. Since these seven rishis were also among the primary eight rishis, who were considered to be the ancestors of the Gotras of Brahmins, the births of these rishis was mythicized.

According to legend, the seven rishis in the next manvantara will be Diptimat, Galava, Parashurama, Kripa, Drauni or Ashvatthama, Vyasa, and Rishyasringa.

=== Names ===
A manvantara (age of Manu) is a unit of time within a kalpa (day of Brahma). There are fourteen manvantaras in a kalpa, each separated by sandhyas (connecting periods). Each manvantara is ruled by a different Manu, with the current seventh one ruled by Vaivasvata Manu. Rishis and their sons are born anew in each manvantara.

Manvantara in Hindu units of time measurement, on a logarithmic scale

Saptarishis in each manvantara of the current kalpa (Śveta-Vārāha Kalpa)
Manu (manvantara)	Saptarishis
Svayambhuva	Atri, Angiras, Pulaha, Pulastya, Kratu, Marichi and Vasishtha
Svarocisha	Urja, Stambha, Prana, Vata, Prishava, Niraya and Parivan
Uttama	Kaukundihi, Kurundi, Dalaya, Sankha, Pravahita, Mita and Sammita
Tamasa	Jyotirdhama, Prithu, Kavya, Chaitra, Agni, Vanaka and Pivara
Raivata	Hirannyaroma, Vedasrí, Urdhabahu, Vedabahu, Sudhama, Parjanya and Mahamuni
Chakshusha	Sumedha, Viraja, Havishman, Uttar, Madhu, Sahishnu and Atinama
Vaivasvata (current)	Bhrigu, Kashyapa, Agastya, Jamadagni, Gautama, Vishvamitra and Bharadvaja
Savarni	Diptimat, Galava, Parashurama, Kripa, Drauni or Ashvatthama, Vyasa and Rishyasringa
Daksha-savarni	Savana, Dyutimat, Bhavya, Vasu, Medhatithi, Jyotishman and Satya
Brahma-savarni	Havishman, Sukriti, Satya, Apammurtti, Nabhaga, Apratimaujas and Satyaketu
Dharma-savarni	Nishchara, Agnitejas, Vapushman, Vishnu, Aruni, Havishman and Anagha
Rudra-savarni	Tapasvi, Sutapas, Tapomurti, Taporati, Tapodhriti, Tapodyuti and Tapodhana
Deva-savarni	Nirmoha, Tatvadarshin, Nishprakampa, Nirutsuka, Dhritimat, Avyaya and Sutapas
Indra-savarni	Agnibshu, Suchi, Aukra, Magadha, Gridhra, Yukta and Ajita

=== Lists ===

1. The Shatapatha Brahmana and Brihadaranyaka Upanishad (2.2.4) acknowledge the names of seven rishis (or Saptarshis) as:

- Atri
- Bharadvaja
- Gautama
- Jamadagni
- Kashyapa
- Vasishtha
- Vishvamitra

2. The Krishna Yajurveda in the Sandhyavandana mantras has it as:

- Angiras
- Atri
- Bhrigu
- Gautama
- Kashyapa
- Kutsa
- Vasishtha

3. The Mahabharata and Brihat Samhita offer the seven rishis's names as:

- Angiras
- Atri
- Kratu
- Marichi
- Pulaha
- Pulastya
- Vasishtha

== Jainism ==
In Jainism it is stated that, "Once at Mathura situated in Uttar Pradesh, seven Riddhidhari Digambara saints having 'Akashgamini Vidya' came during the rainy season for the Chaturmasa season and whose names were: 1.) Surmanyu, 2.) Srimanyu, 3.) Srinjaya, 4.) Sarvasundara, 5.) Jayvana, 6.) Vinayalala and 7.) Jayamitra. They all were sons of King Srinandana of Prabhapuranagara and Queen Dharini. Srinandana the King and Queen Dharini took Diksha, thus becoming the Shishya of the Omniscient Pritinkara Muniraja and attained salvation. Because of great tapacharana of these seven Digambara Munis, the 'Mahamari' disease stopped its evil effect and they all gained the name as 'Saptarishis'. Many idols of these seven Munis were made after that event by King Shatrughna in all four directions of the city."

== Sikhism ==
In the Dasam Granth, a text which is traditionally attributed to Guru Gobind Singh, mentions the biographies of the seven rishis, that is, Valmiki, Kashyapa, Sukra, Baches, Vyas, Khat and Kalidas. These are described under the composition Brahm Avtar.

== Astronomy ==
In ancient Indian astronomy, the pattern of stars known in North America as the Big Dipper and elsewhere in the West as the Plough, or the Great Wagon, (part of the larger constellation of Ursa Major) is called Saptarshi, with the seven stars representing seven rishis: Vasishtha, Marichi, Pulastya, Pulaha, Atri, Angiras and Kratu. A faint companion star near Vashistha, known as Arundhati, is identified with Vashistha’s wife. Together, Vashistha and Arundhati correspond to the double star system Mizar and Alcor.

In Indian astronomy, the seven stars of the Saptarshi Mandala, or Big Dipper are called:

Indian Name	Bayer Designation	Western Name
Kratu	α UMa	Dubhe
Pulaha	β UMa	Merak
Pulastya	γ UMa	Phecda
Atri	δ UMa	Megrez
Angiras	ε UMa	Alioth
Vasishtha	ζ UMa	Mizar
Marichi	η UMa	Alkaid

Vasishtha is accompanied by Arundhati, a faint companion star (Alcor/80 Ursa Majoris).

== See also ==
- Nachiketa
- Dhruva
- Apkallu
