= 75 Tauri =

Star in the constellation Taurus

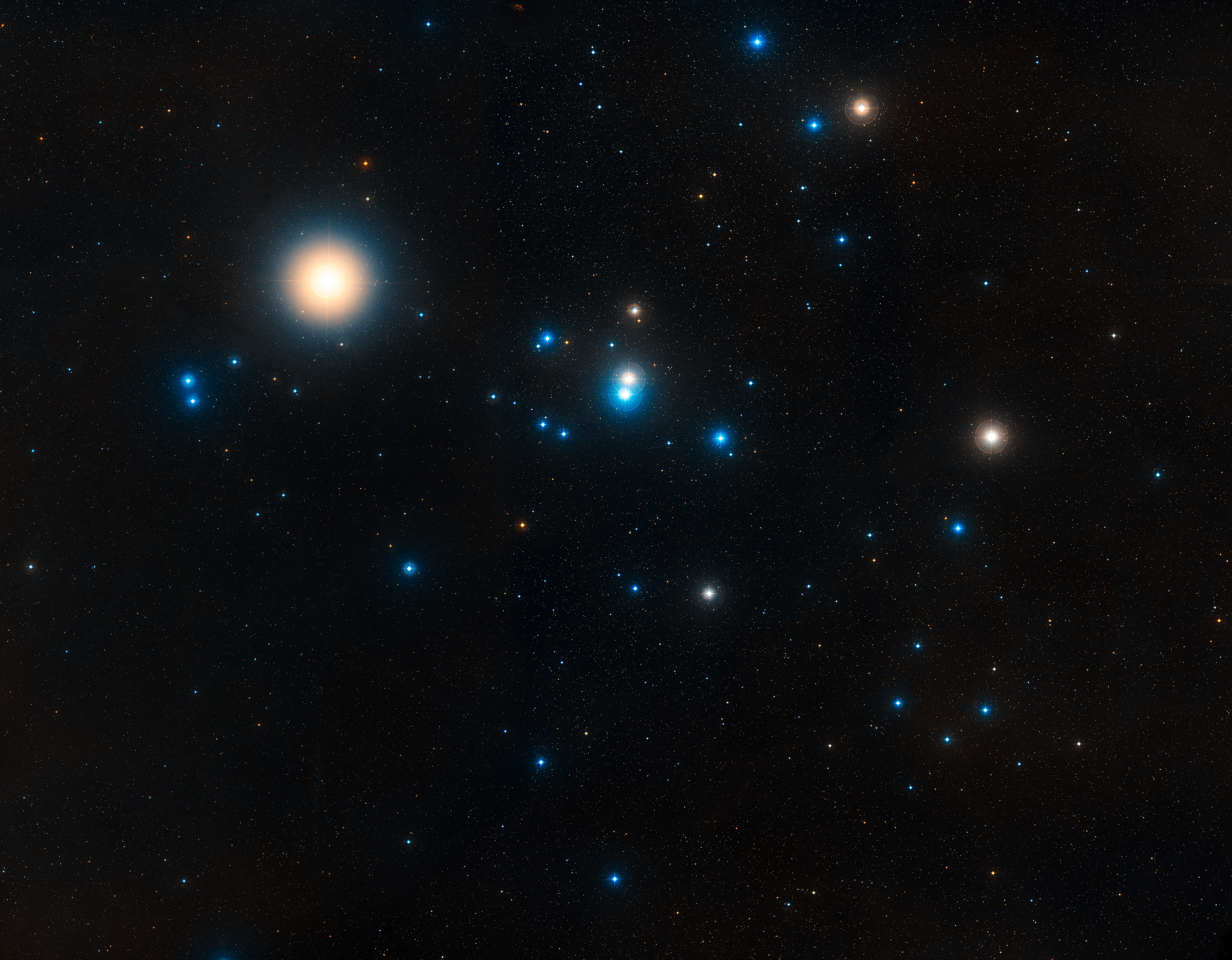
- Location of 75 Tauri (circled in red). Theta Tauri is below, Aldebaran to the left.

Observation data Epoch J2000.0 Equinox ICRS
- Constellation: Taurus
- Right ascension: 04^{h} 28^{m} 26.37004^{s}
- Declination: +16° 21′ 34.8231″
- Apparent magnitude (V): 4.96

Characteristics
- Spectral type: K1 IIIb
- B−V color index: 1.137

Astrometry
Radial velocity (R_{v})	+16.24±0.20 km/s
Proper motion (μ)	RA: +7.91 mas/yr Dec.: +18.14 mas/yr
Parallax (π)	17.47±0.42 mas
Distance	187 ± 4 ly (57 ± 1 pc)
Absolute magnitude (M_{V})	1.18

Details
Mass	1.53±0.23 M_{☉}
Radius	11 R_{☉}
Luminosity	40.74+2.02 −1.92 L_{☉}
Surface gravity (log g)	2.81±0.28 cgs
Temperature	4,697±60 K
Metallicity [Fe/H]	−0.08±0.11 dex
Rotational velocity (v sin i)	2.5 km/s
Age	2.7+1.0 −1.5 Gyr

Other designations
- Shakata, 75 Tau, BD+16°605, HD 28292, HIP 20877, HR 1407, SAO 93950, WDS J04284+1622AB

Database references
SIMBAD	data

75 Tauri, also named Shakata, is a single, orange-hued star in the zodiac of constellation Taurus. It is a dim star but visible to the naked eye with an apparent visual magnitude of 4.96. Based upon an annual parallax shift of 17.47 mas as seen from Earth's orbit, it is located around 187 light years away. Due to its position near the ecliptic, it is subject to lunar occultations. The star is moving further from the Sun with a heliocentric radial velocity of +16 km/s.

The stellar classification of 75 Tauri is K1 IIIb, indicating it is an aging giant star that has exhausted the supply of hydrogen at its core. At the estimated age of roughly 2.7 billion years, this has become a red clump star that is generating energy through helium fusion in its core region. The star has 1.5 times the mass of the Sun and has expanded to 11 times the Sun's radius. It is radiating 41 times the Sun's luminosity from its enlarged photosphere at an effective temperature of around 4,697 K.

In Indian astronomy, the Hyades is referred to as Shakata or Rohiṇīśakaṭa (रोहिणीशकट), the cart of Rohini (the star Aldebaran). The IAU Working Group on Star Names adopted the name Shakata for this star on 17 May 2026, selected since it is in the central area of the Hyades asterism (though it is not part of the star cluster).
