= Rohini (nakshatra) =

Hindu goddess

- A Nakshatra Goddess; The Personification of Aldebaran
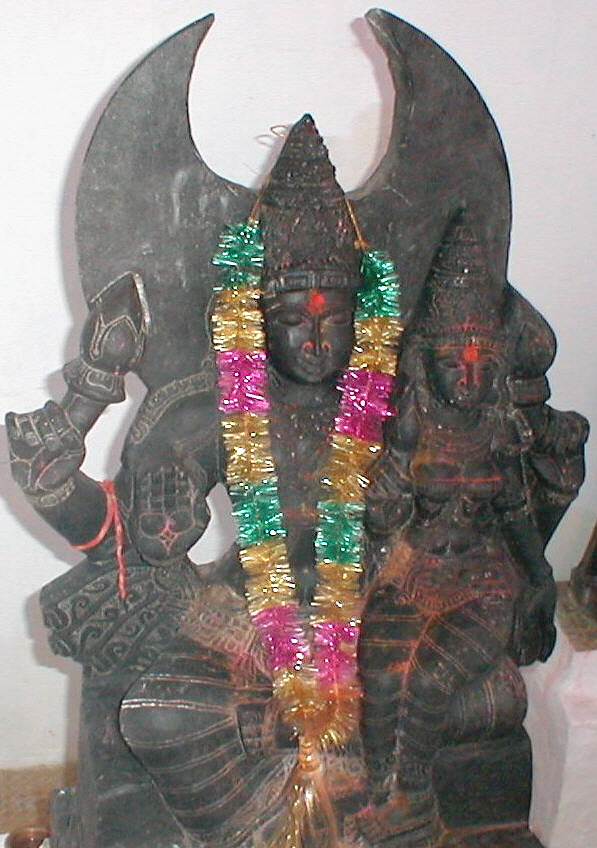
- Chandra and Rohini
- Affiliation: Devi
- Abode: Chandraloka

Genealogy
- Parents: Daksha (father); Asikni (mother)
- Consort: Chandra
- Children: Varchas

Rohini (Sanskrit: रोहिणी) is the goddess of stars in Hinduism and the favorite consort of Chandra, the moon god. She is one of the 27 daughters of the prajapati Daksha and his wife Asikni. As "the red goddess" (also known as Rohini Devi), she is the personification of the orange-red star Aldebaran, the brightest star in the Taurus constellation.

== In Hinduism ==
In Hindu, 27 daughters of Daksha and Asikni were married to Chandra.

Chandra spent most of his time with Rohini, which enraged his other wives, who subsequently complained about this to their father. Seeing his daughters unhappy, Daksha cursed Chandra with leprosy and proclaimed that the Moon would wax and wane each month.

Rohini, along with her sisters Kṛttikā and Revati, are often described as deified beings and "mothers".

== In Indian astronomy ==
In Indian astronomy, the fourth of the 27 nakshatras (lunar stations) is named Rohini. It is represented by an asterism corresponding to the Hyades, with the brightest star being Aldebaran. Rohini literally means "red", referring specifically to the reddish star Aldebaran. The lunar station Rohini spans from 10° 0' to 23° 20' in Vṛṣabha constellation (Taurus).

The Hyades are also traditionally referred to as Rohini shakata, "the cart of Rohini (Aldebaran)". When the Moon or a planet crosses the Hyades, it is called Rohini shakata bheda, "cutting through the cart". The IAU Working Group on Star Names has adopted the name "Shakata" for the star 75 Tauri, which is in the Hyades as an asterism.

== In Indian astrology ==
In Indian astrology, also known as Jyotisha, Rohini is the fourth lunar station or nakshatra of the zodiac, ruled by the Moon. Lord Krishna's birth star is Rohini and it is believed there exists a significance in his choice to be born under the influence of this star.

== Rohini Nakshatra in Tamil Vedic Astrology ==
In Tamil Vedic Astrology, Rohini Nakshatra is the 4th star out of the 27 lunar nakshatras. The zodiac placement of this nakshatra falls on Taurus (Vrishabha Rasi).The Ruling Planet of this Nakshatra is Moon. The Presiding Deity is Lord Brahma (The Creator). The lucky colour for Rohini Nakshatra is White.

== Beyond the Indian subcontinent and Hinduism ==
Rohini is known as Gorakak Devi (Khmer: គោរាគៈទេវី) in Cambodia; she is the wife of Chandra in Hinduism, a tradition passed down from the Khmer Empire, and the protective goddess of Monday. She is worshipped during the Cambodian New Year if the first day of the year falls on a Monday according to the Cambodian calendar (Khmer: ពិធីផ្ទេរតំណែងទេវតាឆ្នាំថ្មី), as she is believed to descend from heaven to care for the people of this land for one year until the following New Year.

Gorakak Devi's appearance is influenced by Cambodian culture, including local Buddhist imagery. Her vāhana (mount) is a tiger. She has only two hands, carries a Khanda and Royal Staff, and her clothes are yellow.
