= Svaha =

Hindu goddess of sacrifices and a Vedic invocation

- Goddess of Sacrifices
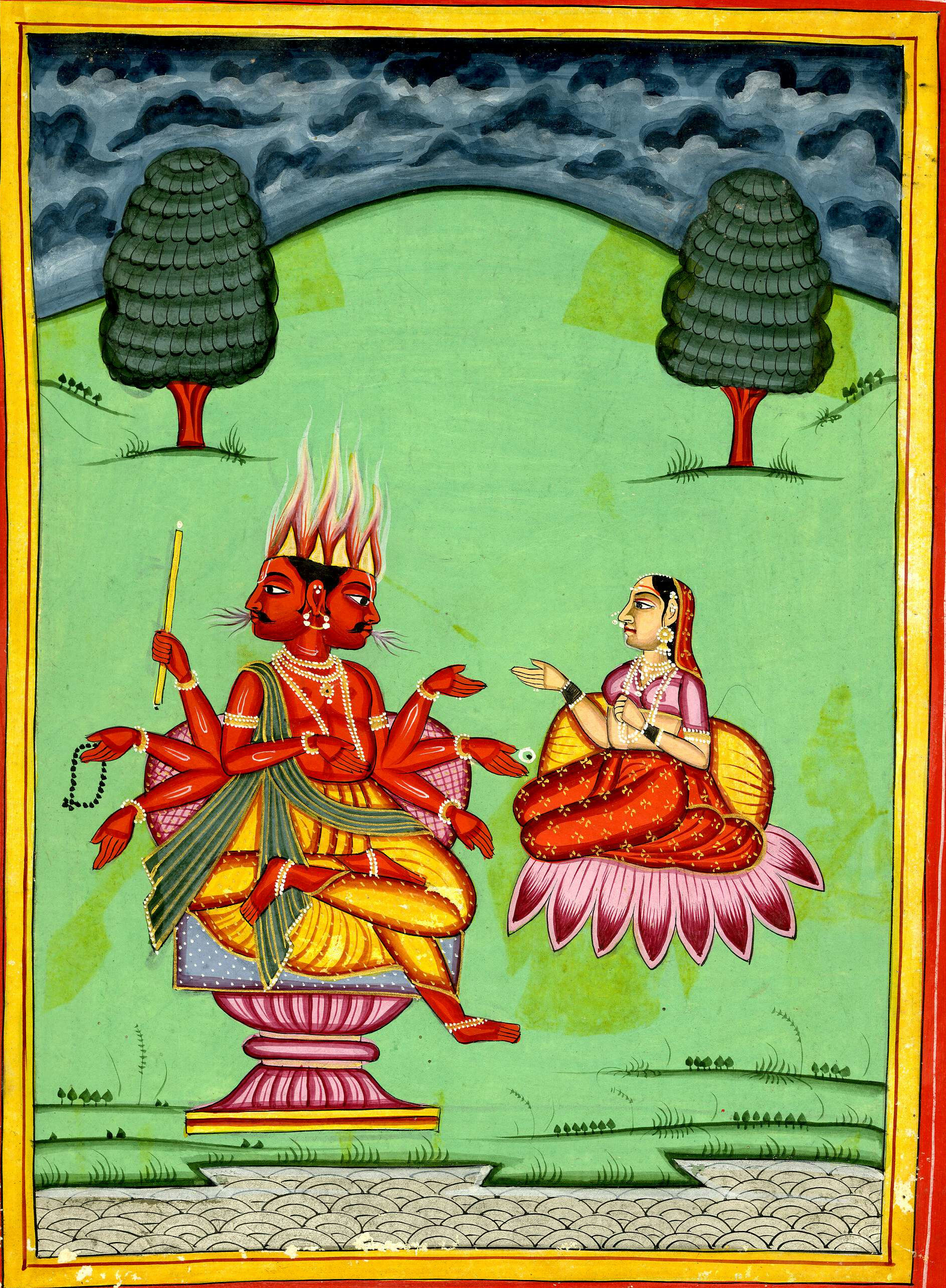
- Agni with Svaha
- Affiliation: Devi
- Abode: Agniloka
- Mantra: Om Svaha

Genealogy
- Parents: Daksha (father) and Prasuti (mother) (Note: In some texts, Svaha is mentioned as the daughter of Brihaspati and Tara.)
- Consort: Agni
- Children: Pavaka, Pavamana, Shuchi, Agneya, Skanda

Svaha (Sanskrit: स्वाहा, IAST: Svāhā) is a Sanskrit term in Indian religions which refers to a goddess and also to a kind of incantation used in mantras and rituals.

In Hinduism, Svaha, also referred to as Manyanti, is the Hindu goddess of sacrifices featured in the Vedas. She is the consort of Agni, and the daughter of either Daksha or Brihaspati, depending on the literary tradition. According to the Brahmavaivarta Purana, she is an aspect of Prakriti (nature), an element without which Agni cannot sustain.

Hinduism and Mahayana Buddhism (including Vajrayana) both make use of Svāhā as a mantric invokation recited during rituals or as part of mantras. As a feminine noun, svāhā in the Rigveda may also mean oblation (to Agni or Indra). Svaha is also considered to mean an auspicious ending.

== Etymology ==
Etymologically, the Sanskrit term derives from the root words सू sū- "good" and आहा -āhā "to call".

== Invocation ==
Hinduism and Mahayana Buddhism both make use of the Sanskrit word svāhā (romanized Sanskrit transcription; Devanagari: स्वाहा; Khmer: ស្វាហា; Thai: สวาหะ; Chinese: 薩婆訶, sà pó hē, Japanese: sowaka; Tibetan: སྭཱ་ཧཱ་ sw'a h'a; Korean: 사바하, sabaha; Vietnamese: ta bà ha) as a ritual or mantric invocation. The term was first used in Vedic ritual, where it was uttered during offerings to the sacred fire. With each ladle of the offering, the priest would say svāhā. The Yajur Veda contains numerous invocations structured with a deity’s name in the dative case (indicating "to" or "for" the deity), followed by svāhā, such as agnaye svāhā ("to Agni, svāhā") and somāya svāhā ("to Soma, svāhā") (see Taittirīya Saṃhitā 7.1.14.1). These formulae may have influenced the development of Buddhist mantras. Svāhā is also chanted to offer oblation to the gods. Svāhā is often included at the end of a specific mantra, which may invoked during yajna fire sacrifices, yogic practices (like japa) and worship.

Svāhā is not technically a mantra in itself. According to Monier-Williams, its likely etymology is su (meaning good, well, whole, etc.) combined with ah (meaning to call, to say, to speak, etc.), which would render a literal meaning such as "well spoken." Conze translates it as "all hail," a choice followed by many other translators. He describes svāhā as a term of blessing—"an ecstatic shout of joy, expressive of a feeling of complete release"

In Buddhist texts, svāhā first appears in the dhāraṇīs inserted into Mahāyāna sūtras, such as the Lotus Sūtra and the Golden Light Sūtra. It subsequently became a common ending for Buddhist mantras. While Conze speculates that it might indicate a feminine deity, there is no clear basis for this claim."

== Deity ==
=== Legends ===
Svaha is personified as a goddess and as the consort of Agni. According to the Brahmavidya Upanishad, Svaha represents the shakti or power that cannot be burned by Agni. In the Upanishads, Svaha confesses to be enamoured by Agni and wishes to dwell with him. Hence, the deities state that oblations would be offered to Agni while invoking her name during hymns, allowing Svaha to dwell with Agni in perpetuity.

In some versions, she is one of the many divine mothers of Kartikeya (Skanda). She is also the mother of Agneya (Aagneya) — the daughter of Agni. She is considered to be a daughter of Daksha and his consort Prasuti. She is thought to preside over burnt offerings. Her body is said to consist of the four Vedas and her six limbs are considered to be the six Angas of the Vedas.

==== Story ====
In the Mahabharata Vana Parva, Markandeya narrates her story to the Pandavas. Svaha was the daughter of Daksha. She fell in love with the God of Fire, Agni, and was pursuing him. Agni did not notice her. He presided over the sacrificial rituals of the Saptarishis. The deity became highly besotted with the wives of the Saptarishis who were so ravishing that he kept staring at them.

Finally, Agni could not bear the guilt of longing for wives belonging to someone else and he went to the forests to perform penances. Svaha followed him and understood his desire. She took the forms of the wives of the Saptarishis (though she was unable to take the form of Arundhati, wife of Vashishtha) and approached Agni six times, seducing him and throwing the seed of each union into a golden pot, from which Skanda was born.

=== Literature ===
==== Brahmanda Purana ====
The Brahmanda Purana mentions the names of the children of Svaha: Pavamāna, Pāvaka, and Śuci.

==== Devi Bhagavata Purana ====
In the Devi Bhagavata Purana, Narayana offers Narada the procedure to meditate upon Svaha:

The following is the Dhyānam (meditation) of Svāhā Devī :-- O Devī Svāhā! Thou art embodied of the Mantras; Thou art the success of the Mantras; Thou art Thyself a Siddhā; Thou givest success and the fruits of actions to men; Thou dost good to all. Thus meditating, one should offer Pādya (water for washing the feet), etc., uttering the basic Mantra; success then comes to him. Now hear about the Radical Seed Mantra. The said mantra (Mūla mantra) is this :-- “Om Hrīm Śrīm Vahnijāyāyai Devyai Svāhā.” If the Devī be worshipped with this Mantra, all the desires come to a successful issue.

— Devi Bhagavata Purana, Book 9, Chapter 43

=== Beyond the Indian subcontinent and Hinduism ===
In Hinduism in Thailand call her Mae Phra pheling (แม่พระเพลิง) Which means goddess of Fire in Thai Language,. She is generally respected along with goddess Ganga and Mae Phra phay (wife of Vayu) from Hinduism with Phra Mae Thorani and Phosop from tai folk religion, They five are usually worshipped or mentioned together., Her famous and much talked about sculptures in Thailand include Kuan Yin Inter-Religious Park Phu Sawan sub district, Kaeng Krachan district, Phetchaburi province. and Baan Sukhawadee, Sukhumvit Road, Bang Lamung district, Chonburi province. In general she is worshipped invite as a protector in various rituals of Hinduism in Thailand and Tai folk religion with other four goddesses Including being mentioned as a witness to the merit-making ceremony and the water pouring ceremony is a traditional Thai Buddhist ritual style.

The cult of her and the other four goddesses is quietly popular in Thailand. , She and four other goddesses are revered as the goddess guardians of area Bang Saen, Chonburi Province , The courtyard five Benjathevi (ลานเบญจเทวี) in side of ONPA Hotel & Residence hotel in Bang Saen Beach, Chonburi Province It is one of the sacred places dedicated to her and other four goddesses.
