= Marichi =

Sage in Hindu mythology

- Member of the Saptarishi
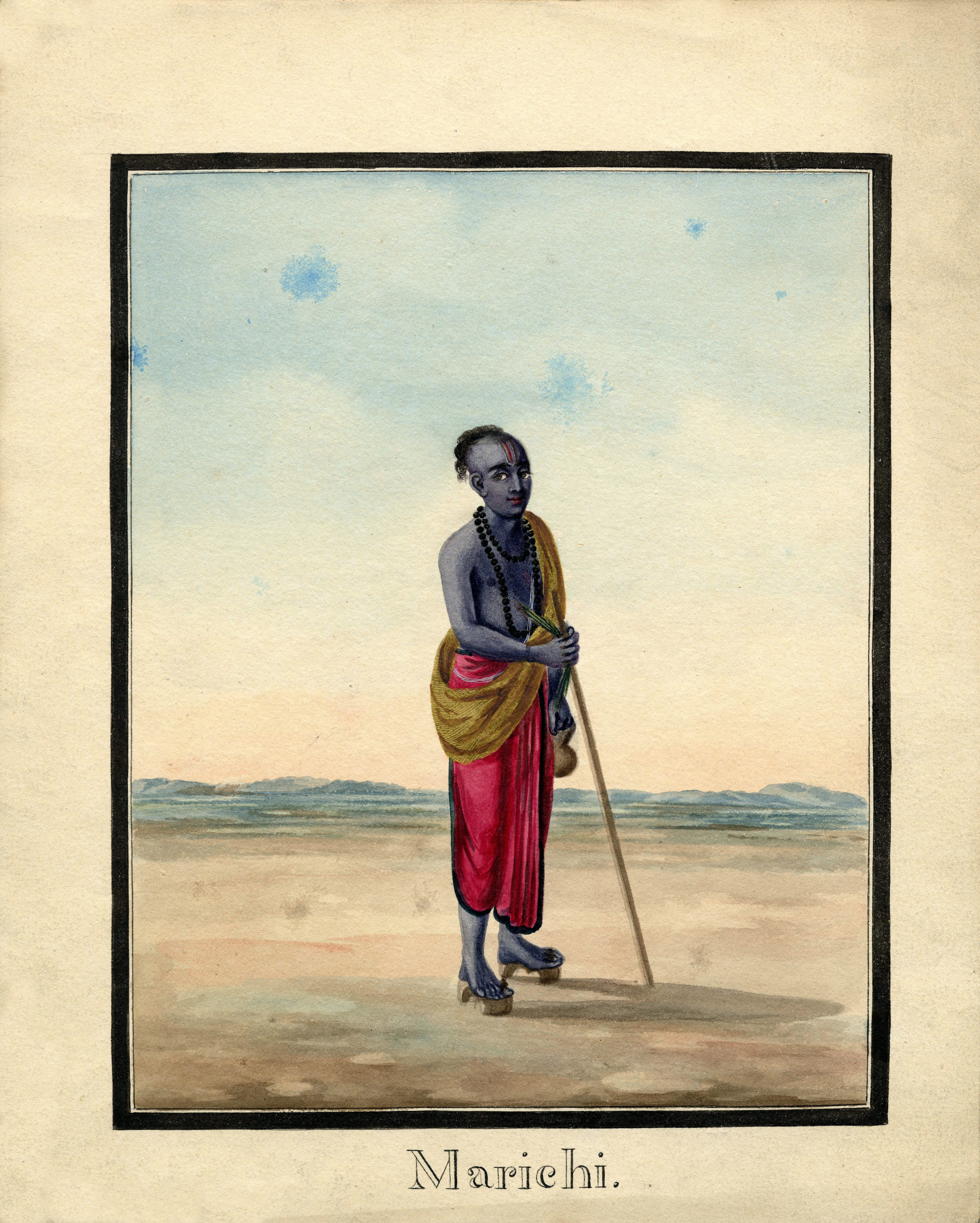
- Marichi

Genealogy
- Parents: Brahma (father)
- Spouse: Kalā, Urna, and Sambhuti Dharmavrata
- Children: Kashyapa (by Kalā)

Marichi (Sanskrit: मरीचि, romanized: Marīci, lit. 'ray of light') or Mareechi is the mind-born son of Brahma, and one of the Saptarishi in Hindu Sanskriti. He is also the father of Kashyapa, and the grandfather of the devas and the asuras.

In Jainism, he is referred to as one of the previous reincarnations of the 24th Tirthankara, Mahavira and the grandson of Rishabhanatha, the first Tirthankara.

== Vedas ==
Marīci is not directly mentioned in the Vedas; however his descendant Kaśyapa Mārīca is attributed several sukta-s in the R̥gveda by the Anukramaṇi.

== Saptarishi ==
Saptarishi, a Sanskrit dvigu meaning "seven sages" are the seven rishis who are extolled at many places in the Vedas and Hindu literature. The Vedic Samhitas never enumerate these rishis by name, though later Vedic texts such as the Brahmanas and Upanishads do so. While earlier texts do not mention Marichi as one of the seven, references can be found in the epic Mahabharata. In some parts of India, people believe these are seven stars of the Big Dipper named "Vashista", "Marichi", "Pulastya", "Pulaha", "Atri", "Angiras" and "Kratu". There is another star slightly visible within it, known as "Arundhati". He is considered one among the seven great sages, the saptarishis. Marichi, like some of the other sages, followed the path of worldly duties denouncing total renunciation. He had many children, the notable one being sage Kashyapa.

=== Petrification of Dharmavrata ===
Dharmavrata was one of the many consorts of the sage. Once, she was asked by her husband to massage his legs, during which he fell asleep. During this time, she was visited by Brahma, upon which she was struck with the dilemma of whether to receive the deity with the proper honours as was custom, or perform her husband's bidding. She chose to attend to the deity. When Marichi observed the absence of his wife, he cursed her to be petrified. She pleaded her innocence, and proved it by performing a penance amid the fires. Vishnu was pleased by her devotion. She requested Vishnu to revert her curse, but Vishnu said that the curse could not be reverted, but the stone she would be turned to would continue to be regarded as Devashila, which would be considered sacred and have the essence of the Trimurti and Lakshmi.

== Prajapatis ==
Before the creation started, Brahma, the Hindu god of creation, needed a few people who can be held responsible for the creation of the remaining Universe. Therefore, he is believed to have created ten Prajapatis (Ruler of the people) from his manas (mind) and nine from his body. Marichi is one of the manasputras of Brahma. The ten Prajapatis are as follows:

1. Marichi
2. Atri
3. Angirasa
4. Pulaha
5. Pulasthya
6. Krathu
7. Vasishta
8. Prachethasa
9. Bhrigu
10. Narada

== Life ==
The life of Marichi is known more by the account of his descendants, notably by the works of sage Kashyapa. Marichi is then married to Kala, and gave birth to Kashyapa (Kashyapa is also sometimes acknowledged as a Prajapati, who has inherited the right of creation from his father).

== Jainism ==
In Jain scriptures, Marichi was the son of Bharata Chakravartin who after many births was born as 24th Tirthankara of Jainism, Mahavira. In his life as Marichi, he became a Jain monk following Rishabhanatha, first tirthankara, but was unable to follow the hard rules of Jain penance. So he took a robe, pedals and an umbrella and founded his own religion, taking Kapila as his first disciple.

== See also ==
- Eta Ursae Majoris
- Mahavira
