= Swayambhuva Manu =

First of the fourteen Manus

Svayambhuva Manu

Genealogy
- Parents: Brahma (creator); Saraswati (Note: in some Puranas)
- Consort: Shatarupa
- Children: Priyavrata; Uttanapada; Akuti; Devahuti; Prasuti

Svayambhuva Manu (Sanskrit: स्वायम्भुव मनु, romanized: Svayaṃbhuva Manu) is the first of the fourteen Manus, the first man of a Yuga in Hindu cosmogony. He is the manasaputra (mind-born son) of Brahma and husband of Shatarupa, the first woman. He is stated to have divided the Vedas into four sections.

== Legend ==
The creation of Svayambhuva Manu and Shatarupa from the body of Brahma is mentioned in the Puranas:

[...] O sage, I [Brahma] split myself into two having assumed two forms. One half had the form of a woman and the other half that of a man. (Note: Śiva-purāṇa speaks of Brahmā splitting his body into two parts, the male and female, identified as Manu and Śatarūpā. Cp. Matsya-purāṇa (‘A Study’ by V. S. Agrawal) 3.31.) He then created in her a couple, the means of excellent nature. The man was Svayambhuva Manu, the greatest of the means (of creation). The woman was Satarupa, a Yogini, an ascetic woman.

— Shiva Purana, Section 2.1, Chapter 16, verses 10-12

According to the Bhagavata Purana,

While he was thus absorbed in contemplation and was observing the supernatural power, two other forms were generated from his body. They are still celebrated as the body of Brahma. Out of them, the one who had the male form became known as the Manu named Svayambhuva, and the woman became known as Satarupa, the queen of the great soul Manu.

— Bhagavata Purana, 3.12.52

According to the Devi Bhagavata Purana

The four faced Brahma, on being born, produced from His mind Svayambhuva Manu and his wife shatarupa, the embodiment of all virtues. For this very reason, Svayambuva Manu has been known as the mind-born son of Brahma.

— Devi Bhagavata Purana, 10.01.7.14

Svayambhuva Manu married Shatarupa. He had two sons named Priyavrata and Uttanapada, and three daughters named Akuti, Devahuti, and Prasuti. Manu married his first daughter Akuti to Rishi Ruci, his middle daughter Devahuti to Prajapati Kardama and his youngest daughter Prasuti to Prajapati Daksha.
