= Kratu =

Hindu sage

- Affiliation: Prajapati

Genealogy
- Parents: Brahma (father)
- Siblings: Punya and Satyavati
- Spouse: Kriya or Santati
- Children: The 60,000 Balakhilyas

Kratu (Sanskrit: क्रतु, lit. 'strength') is described as one of the manasaputras, the mind-born children of the creator deity, Brahma, in Hinduism. He is also a rishi, who appears in two different ages.

He is considered to be one among the seven great sages of the age of the first Manu, the Saptarishis, believed to have originated from the mind of Brahma. In another legend, he is believed to have been born from his father's left eye.

== Legend ==
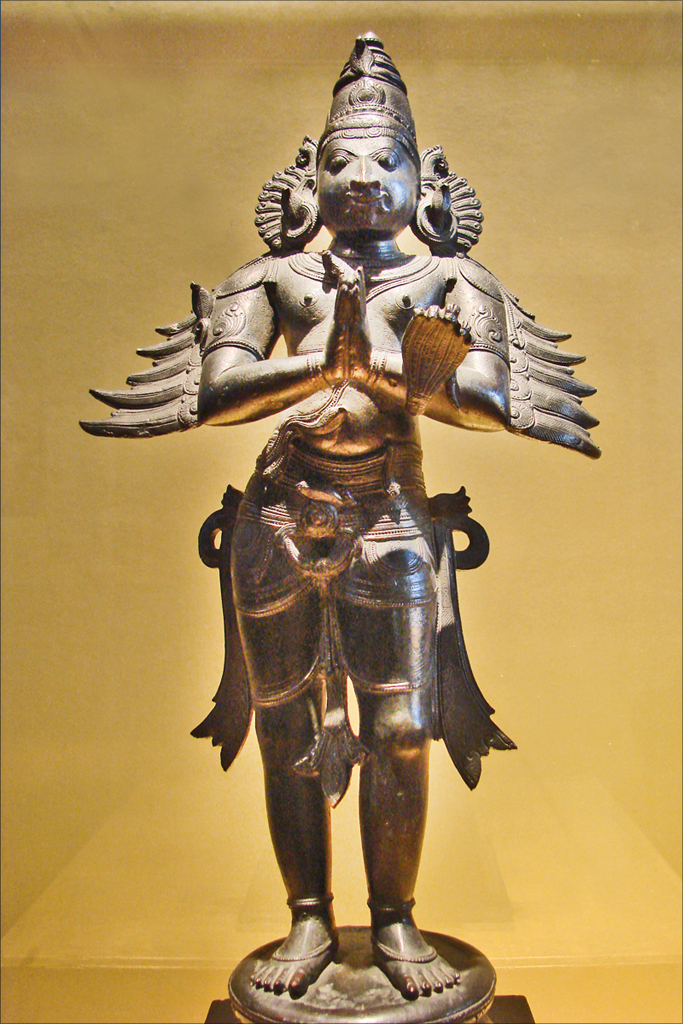
Statue of Garuda, whose birth is associated with the sons of Kratu.

In the Svayambhuva Manvantara, Kratu is a Prajapati, a son of Brahma. He is also the son-in-law of Prajapati Kardama. His wife is named Kriya. It is said that he has 60,000 children. Their name is included in the eighth book of the Rigveda. Kratu also has two sisters, Punya and Satyavati.

He is also stated to be married to Santati in the Puranas, and the pair has sixty thousand children, called the Balakhilyas, who were each of the size of a thumb, but possessed great mastery over the senses. According to the Mahabharata, while helping the sage Kashyapa with a sacrifice, they carried with them chips of wood, even as the devas brought heaps of logs. They were insulted when Indra, the king of the devas, laughed at their efforts. By the power of their penance, they started to create another Indra. Terrified, Indra sought the assistance of Kashyapa. The sage pacified the Balakhilyas, and told them that the fruits of their penance would not be in vain; They would be employed to bless Vinata, who was also performing a penance at the time, with a son who would be able to overpower Indra. Accordingly, Garuda was born to her, who would defeat Indra and the devas, procuring amrita to release his mother from Kadru's bondage. In a different account, the Balakhilyas were able to please Shiva, who gave them a boon that they would be able to produce a bird, which would steal a pot of amrita from Indra.

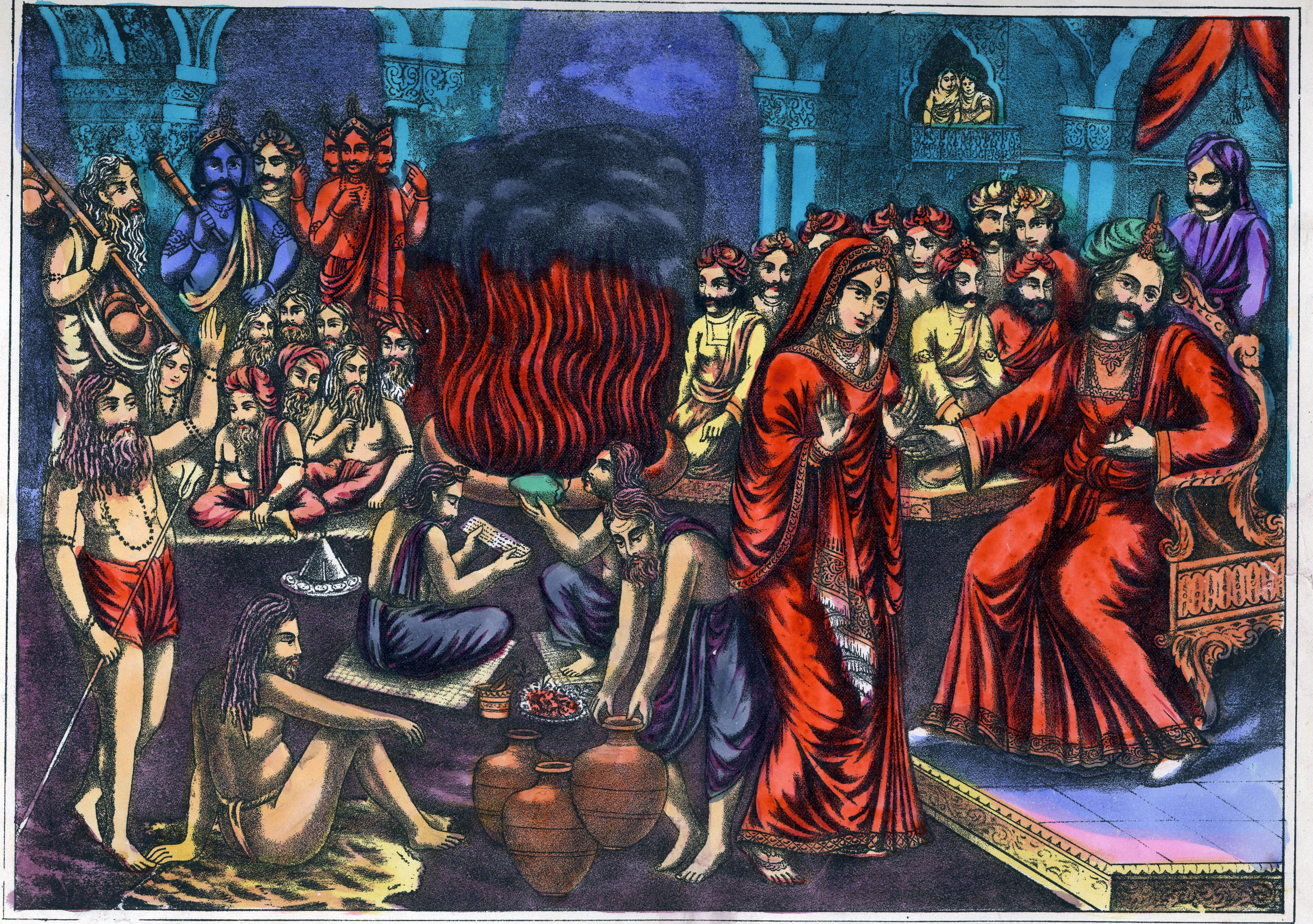
Daksha insults Shiva while arguing with Sati.

According to the Shiva Purana, due to his spouse Sati's suicide during the Daksha yajna (the sacrifice of Daksha), Shiva sent his followers to massacre everyone who attended the sacrifice, which included Kratu. As instructed, his followers started punishing each and every deity and rishi who attended the holy sacrifice. Both the testicles of Kratu are described to have been severed during this massacre. When the attendees and survivors begged for his forgiveness, Shiva agreed, but as a punitive measure, he turned the attendees into animals, or found a suitable punishment for their sin. After his testicles were restored, Kratu married Sannati, the daughter of Daksha. The seven sages, which included him, were all transformed into pygmy sages, no bigger than the joint of the thumb. They immediately started to resort to a life of piety, becoming renowned students of the Vedas.

Kratu was again born in the Vaivasvata Manvantara (the seventh and current manvantara) because of Shiva’s boon. In this Manvantara, he had no family. His origin here states that he was born from the hand of Brahma, whereas other rishis are described as having been born from other parts of the deity's form. As he had no family or children, Kratu adopted Agastya’s son, Idhmavaha.

== Comparative mythology ==
Kratu may share a cognate with the Greek mythological deity Kratos, whose name is also associated with strength.

== See also ==
- Bhrigu
- Kashyapa
- Agastya
