= Angiras =

Hindu sage

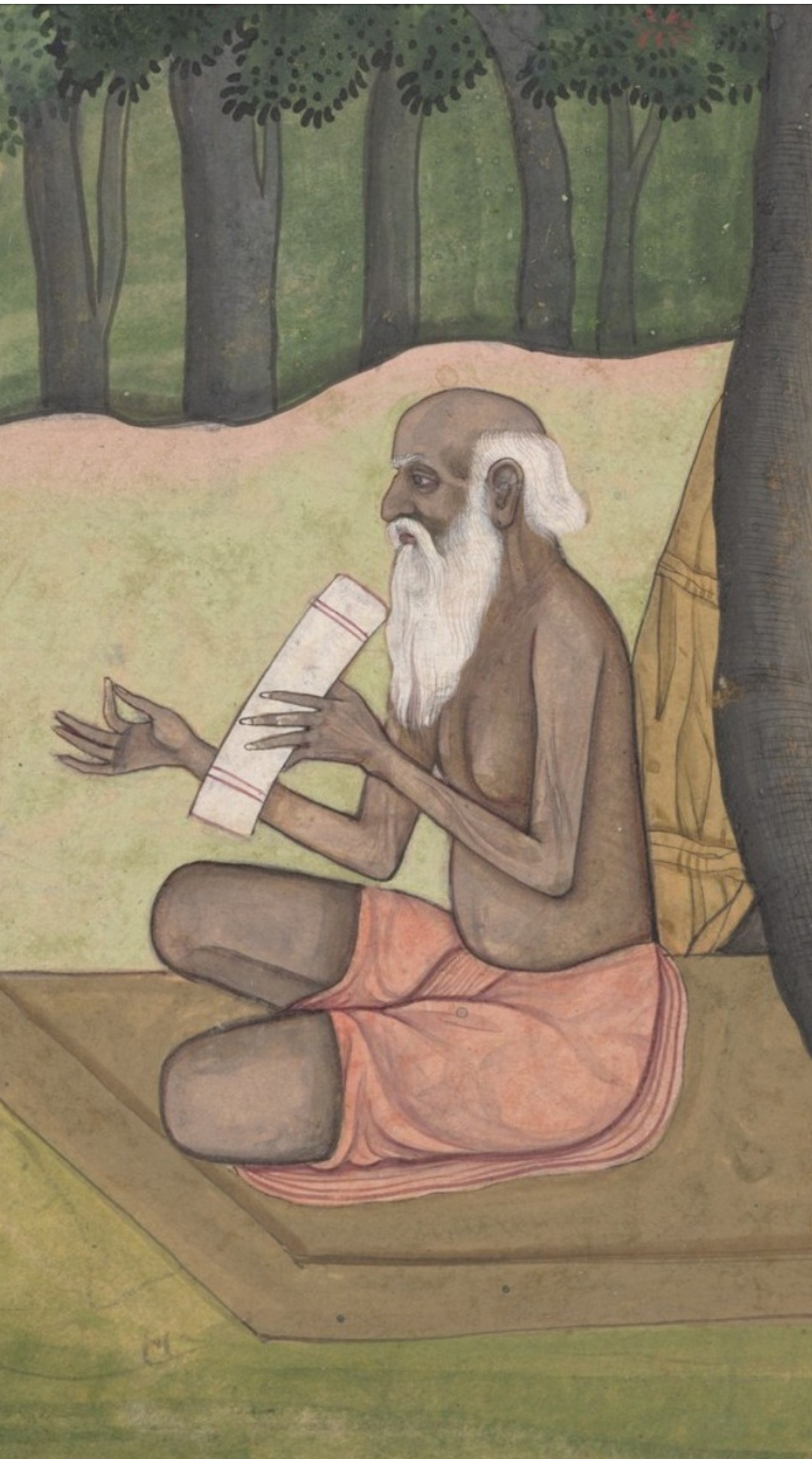
- An 18th-century painting of Angiras

Personal life
- Spouse: Surūpa, Smriti
- Children: Utathya, Brihaspati and other children
- Parent(s): Brahma or Agni (father; as per Puranic scriptures)

Religious life
- Religion: Historical Vedic religion

Angiras (Sanskrit: अङ्गिरस् (stem), IAST: Aṅgiras, Sanskrit pronunciation: ['ɐŋɡirɐs], nominative singular Sanskrit: अङ्गिराः, IAST: Aṅgirāḥ, Sanskrit pronunciation: ['ɐŋɡirɐ:h], rendered Angirā in Hindi) was a Vedic rishi (sage) of Hinduism. He is described in the Rigveda as a teacher of divine knowledge, a mediator between men and gods, as well as stated in other hymns to be the first of Agni-devas (fire gods). In some texts, he is considered to be one of the seven great sages or Saptarishis, but in others he is mentioned but not counted in the list of seven great sages. In some manuscripts of Atharvaveda, the text is attributed to "Atharvangirasah", which is a compound of sage Atharvan and Angira. The student family of Angira are called "Angira", and they are credited to be the authors of some hymns in the first, second, fifth, eighth, ninth, and tenth books of the Rigveda. By the time of the composition of the Rigveda, the Angirases were an old Rishi clan, and were stated to have participated in several events.

== Texts ==
Many hymns of the Rigveda credit the Angirases as their authors, mainly in Mandalas I and VIII. Various Angirasa sub-clans, including the Śunahotras, the Gautamas, and the Bhāradvājas composed Mandalas II, IV, and VI respectively.

Other than crediting authorship, the Vedic texts mention sage Angiras in various roles such as a fire priest or a singer. For example, the allegorical hymn 3.31 of the Rigveda calls him a singer:

The most inspired one came, assuming a friendly attitude,
The rock made ripe (its) fruit for the one who performs the kind deed,
The young hero attained (his aim) with the youths, assuming a warlike attitude,
And here right away, the singing Angiras appeared.

— Rigveda 3.31.7, Translator: Tatyana J. Elizarenkova

According to Max Muller—a professor of Sanskrit and Indology at the Oxford University—the sage Angiras in Vedic literature is different from the plural term Angirasa, and these terms refer to different people. The Angiras rishi is different from the group of sorcerers in Atharvaveda also named Angirasa, and according to Muller, the Vedic rishi is also different from a class of divine beings who too are called Angirasa in the Vedic texts and described as "sprung from coals (angara)".

In Buddhist Pali canonical texts such as Digha Nikaya, Tevijja Sutta describes a discussion between the Buddha and Vedic scholars of his time. The Buddha names ten rishis, calls them "early sages" and makers of ancient verses that have been collected and chanted in his era, and among those ten rishis is Angiras. (Note: The Buddha names the following as "early sages" of Vedic verses, "Atthaka (either Ashtavakra or Atri), Vamaka, Vamadeva, Vessamitta (Visvamitra), Yamataggi, Angirasa, Bharadvaja, Vasettha (Vashistha), Kassapa (Kashyapa) and Bhagu (Bhrigu)".)

== Life in Puranas ==
The name Angirasas is applied generically to several Puranic individuals. Further, the Vedic sage Angiras appears in medieval Hindu texts with contradictory roles as well as many different versions of his birth, marriage and biography. In some, he is described to be the son of Brahma, in others he is one of many Prajapatis. Depending on the legend, he has one, two or four wives. In one myth, his wife is stated to be Surūpa and his sons are Utathya, Samvartana and Brahaspati. Other accounts say that he married Smriti (memory), the daughter of Daksha and later married Svadha (oblation). Yet other Puranic accounts state, he married Shubha and they had seven daughters named after aspects of "fire" and a son named Brihaspati. In some legends, sage Brihaspati is his son.

According to one legend, Angirasa turned his senses inwards and meditated on Para Brahman, the creator of the creator, for several years. The great Tejas he got by birth had multiplied infinitely by his penance. He attained many divine qualities, powers, and riches, and control over many worlds. But he was oblivious of all the worldly attainments and did not stop his penance. Due to this penance he became one with the Para-Brahman and thus attained the state of “Brahmarishi”. He had visions of many Vedic Mantras and brought them to this earthly world. He is credited as being the source of great number of Vedic Hymns and mantras and also believed to have introduced fire-worship along with sage Bhrigu.

He is one of Saptarishis in the Puranas.

Ghora of the Angiras family is identified by some scholars as Neminatha, the twenty-second tirthankara in Jainism.

== See also ==
- Angra Mainyu ("wrong spirit" or "enemy spirit", according to Zoroastrianism)
- Dirghatamas (grandson of Angiras, a great sage born blind. Father of Gautama Maharishi)
- Bhrigu (father of Shukracharya, guru of asuras)
