= Devon Ke Dev...Mahadev =

Indian History television series

- Also known as: Mahadeva; Devon Ke Dev...Mahadev - Rudra Bhi Aur Bhole Bhi
- Genre: Theology
- Written by: C.L. Saini; Brij Mohan Pandey; Koel Chaudhuri; Mihir Bhuta; Dr. Bodhisattva; Aas Mohammad Abbasi; Bhavna Vyas; Manoj Tripathi; Utkarsh Naithani; Subrat Sinha; Swati Pande
- Directed by: Nikhil Sinha; Ismail Umar Khan; Manish Singh; Govind Agrawal; Satish Bhargav
- Creative directors: Aniruddh Pathak; Nitin Shukla; Animesh Verma; Hiten Ganatra; Prangshu P Ghosh; Kadar Kazi(kk)
- Starring: Mohit Raina; Mouni Roy; Saurabh Raaj Jain; Sonarika Bhadoria; Puja Banerjee; Suhasi Dhami; Ragini Rishi
- Opening theme: Shiv Shiv
- Composer: Sajan Rajan Mishra
- Country of origin: India
- Original language: Hindi
- No. of episodes: 820

Production
- Executive producer: Amish A Vasani
- Producers: Co Producer; Nikhil Sinha (Triangle Film Company); Creative Producer; Anirudh Pathak
- Cinematography: Deepak Garg; Amit Malvia
- Camera setup: Multi-Camera
- Running time: 20–45 Minutes
- Production company: Triangle Film Company

Original release
- Network: Life OK
- Release: 18 December 2011 – 14 December 2014

Devon Ke Dev… Mahadev (transl. Lord of the Lords… Mahadev), often abbreviated as DKDM, is a series based on Mahadev, one of the main deities of Hinduism. It premiered on 18 December 2011, airing Monday to Friday nights on Life OK. The 820-episode series concluded on 14 December 2014. The entire series has been made available on Disney+ Hotstar and Hulu.

== Plot ==
The show's plot revolves around the story of Lord Shiva, which follows his journey from being an ascetic to a family man.

During the creation of the world according to Lord Vishnu and Lord Brahma, Adi Parashakti leaves Shiva from his Ardhanarishvara form. In order to shape the universe, she takes various births to marry Shiva but fails 106 times due to which Shiva becomes an ascetic. Hence Lord Brahma suggests his mind-born son Prajapati Daksh to please Adi Shakti and request her to incarnate as his daughter.

Adi Parashakti is born the 107th time as Daksh's daughter Sati. Meanwhile, Shiva cuts off Brahma's fifth head making Daksh hate him. Sati falls for Shiva and finally marries him, much to Daksh's dismay. Hence, Daksh humiliates Shiva in front of Sati in his yagna. Unable to tolerate her husband's insult, Sati sacrifices her life once again. An infuriated Shiva orders Virabhadra to behead Daksh. Later, he revives him at Prasuti's request and goes into deep meditation for centuries.

Adi Parashakti then is born as Parvati the 108th time as the daughter of Himavan and his wife Menavati. She is aware of her divinity as are her parents, and grows up in Dadichi's hermitage. From an early age, she starts addressing Mahadev/Shiva as her husband which Menavati, as a concerned mother, dislikes strongly.

When she grows up, Parvati tries to make Mahadev realize that she is none other than his wife Sati reincarnated. But he rejects her and in the process, turns Kamadev into ashes. As a result, Kama's distraught wife, Rati curses Parvati.

Parvati then agrees to marry as per her mother, Menavati's wish. However eventually Parvati and Himavan make Menavati realise who Parvati is, after which she gives in. Parvati goes on to meditate for 3,000 years to please Mahadev to marry her. And finally, Mahadev and Parvati are married. Later, Mahadev imparts some tantric knowledge to Parvati that helps her to take various forms like Nav Durga; Mahavidyas (Kali, Tara, Tripura Sundari, Bhuvaneshvari, Tripura Bhairavi, Chhinnamasta, Dhumavati, Bagalamukhi, Matangi and Kamala) and Matrikas to destroy Raktabeej, Shumbha Nishumbha, Chanda Munda, Durgmasura, Arunasura, Banasura, etc.

== Cast ==
=== Main ===
- Mohit Raina as Lord Shiva / Lord Mahakala / Lord Virabhadra / Lord Bhairava / Ardhanarishvara / Lord Martanda Bhairava (Khandoba) / Lord Nataraja / Lord Lohita (Elder) (also played demon Jalandhara for few episodes) (2011-2014)
- Mouni Roy as Goddess Sati / Goddess Adi Shakti / Adi Parashakti (2011-2014)
- Sonarika Bhadoria / Puja Banerjee / Suhasi Dhami as Goddess Parvati / Goddess Adi Shakti / Goddess Adi Parashakti / Goddess Kali / Goddess Mahakali / Goddess Bhadrakali / Goddess Tara / Goddess Tripura Sundari / Goddess Bhuvaneshvari / Goddess Bhairavi / Chhinnamasta / Goddess Dhumavati / Goddess Bagalamukhi / Ardhanarishvara / Goddess Durga / Goddess Shailaputri / Goddess Brahmacharini / Goddess Chandraghanta / Goddess Kushmanda / Goddess Skandamata / Goddess Katyayani / Goddess Kalaratri / Goddess Mahagauri / Goddess Siddhidhatri / Mumba Devi / Goddess Mhalsa / Goddess Gayatri / Goddess Meenakshi / (2011) / (2012-2013) / (2013-2014) / (2014)
- Darshan Gurjar / Rushiraj Pawar as Lord Kartikeya (2012) / (2012-2014)
- Sadhil Kapoor / Alpesh Dhakan / Ehsaan Bhatia as Lord Ganesha (2012) / (2013-2014) / (2014)
- Sourabh Raaj Jain as Lord Vishnu / Lord Rama / Lord Krishna / Dattatreya (2011-2014)
  - Piyush Sahdev as Lord Rama (2013)
- Ragini Rishi as Goddess Lakshmi / Goddess Sita / Goddess Radha / Vedavati / Goddess Rukmini / Haripriya (2011-2014)
  - Rubina Dilaik as Goddess Sita (2013)
- RidhaKrishna Dutta as Lord Brahma (2011-2014)
- Puja Kameshwar Sharma / Salina Prakash / Via Roy Choudhary as Goddess Saraswati (2011-2012) / (2012-2013) / (2013-2014)

=== Recurring ===
Cast	Character(s)
Kumar Hegde	Nandi
Priyanka Thakare	Suyasha
Gaurav Shetty	Ayyappan
Ahsaas Channa / Ashnoor Kaur	Ashokasundari
Vishal Kotian	Hanuman
Jiten Lalwani	Indra
Tanya Sharma	Devasena
Lavanya Bhardwaj / Rishi Khurana	Nahusha
Kratika Sengar / Reem Shaikh	Manasa
Mohammad Nazim	Shumbha
Vishal Singh	Nishumbha
Shivangi Sharma	Indrani
Manish Bishla	Surya
Vicky Batra / Aryaman Seth	Chandra
Hans Dev Sharma	Vishvakarma
Manoj Kolhatkar	Dadhichi / Pippalada
Yogesh Mahajan	Bhrigu
Aarya Vora	Siddhi
Amrita Singh	Riddhi / Buddhi
Rajeev Bharadwaj	Kashyap
Romanch Mehta	Atri
Jayant Rawal	Maharishi Halahal
Jitendra Trehan	Markandeya
Shailesh Datar	Narada
Pankaj Kalra	Brihaspati
Darshan Kumar	Shukracharya
Anjali Abrol	Meenakshi
Raman Khatri	Atharvan
Atul Singh	Pulaha
Susheel Parashar	Pitamber
Vikramjeet Virk	Banasur
Hemant Choudhary	Prajapati Vishwaroop
Samiksha Bhatt	Jaya
Ram Awana	Chakri
Deepika Upadhyay / Sangeeta Khanayat / Yashashree Chiplunker	Ganga / Godavari / Banai
Mohit Sharma	Vasuki
Kunal Verma	Lakshman
Garima Jain	Urmila
Rohit Sagar	Vayu
Vineet Kumar	Bharat
Harshad Arora	Shatrughna
Ulka Gupta	Goddess Kanya Kumari (Younger)
Arbaaz Ali Khan	Balarama
Vishesh Bansal	Grihapati
Mohit Dagri	Lohitang (Younger)
Raj Premi	Demon Tarakasur
Rahul Dev	Demon Arunasur
Chetan Hansraj	Nighas
Deepak Jethi	Mahishasura
Manav Gohil	Andhaka
Tej Sapru	Shankhachudha
Ankur Nayyar	Krauncha Giri
Ibrar Yakub	Tuhund
Tushar Jha	(Younger) Jalandhara
Arun Bali	Vajranaka (Tarakasur's father)
Akhilendra Mishra	Mahabali
Sanjay Swaraj	Bhasmasur
Manish Wadhwa / Tarun Khanna	Ravan
Sudesh Berry	Malla / Mani
Rakshanda Khan	Madanike
Anupam Bhattacharya	Ripunjay / Devodas
Ojaswi Oberoi / Parakh Madan	Mohini
Ritu Chauhan	Rati
Pankaj Dheer	Maharaj Himavan
Mugdha Shah / Shilpa Tulaskar	Queen Menavati
Khyaati Khandke Keswani	Kritika
Surendra Pal	Prajapati Daksha
Shalini Kapoor Sagar	Queen Prasuti
Rishina Kandhari / Riyanka Chanda	Rajkumari Khyati
Priyanka Panchal	Rajkumari Aditi
Charu Asopa / Kanishka Soni	Rajkumari Revati
Surbhi Shukla	Princess Goddess Rohini
Manini Mishra	Rajkumari Vijaya
Annapurna Vitthal Bhairi	Shanta
Suhasini Mulay	Parvati's grandmother
Deepraj Rana	Parshuram
Amrapali Gupta	Matsyakanya
Prabhat Bhattacharya	King Aayu
Neha Kaul	Rajasekhar wife Queen
Jaya Bhattacharya	Rajkumari Diti
Anand Goradia	Pushpadanta
Dolly Sohi	Mahalasa's mother
Shilpa Shinde	Mahananda
Rajesh Vivek	Yella Koti
Pankaj Berry	Raja Durdum
Mitika Sharma	Queen Sunayana
Mohit Chauhan	King Janaka
Mihir Mishra	King King Dashratha
Gauri Singh	Queen Kaushalya
Anushka Singh	Queen Sumitra
Manasvi Vyas	Queen Kaikeyi
Tapeshwari Sharma	Usha / Behula
Arti Singh	Vaani
Bhavna Khatri	Chitralekha
Daya Shankar Pandey	Lakulish
Tushar Dalvi	Chandradhar
Malhar Pandya	Aniruddha / Lakhsmichandra
Kalpesh Rajgor	Supriy
Parul Chaudhary	Sanaka
Deepali Pansare	Tulsi
Rajendra Chawla	Acharya Gyanmurti
Gungun Uprari	Maharani
Neha Marda	Vrinda
Jaya Binju	Andhaka's Wife
Chestha Mehta	Prithvi
Javed Pathan	Mayadhari
Samiksha Bhatnagar	Mandodari: Ravana's Wife
Mansi Sharma	Indrani
Sudeep Sarangi	Shatbhish
Anju Ajayakumar	Child Usha
Rajesh Kava	King Rajasekhar

== Production ==
=== Development ===
Ritoo Jenjani had done the prosthetic makeup for the presentation of Kali.

90 people were working in the graphic department of the series. An episode of the series cost ₹14 Lakhs for production.

In April 2014, a fire broke out on one of the show's sets in Mumbai. However, none were injured with only minor damages to property.

=== Casting ===
Sonarika Bhadoria was replaced by Puja Bannerjee as Parvati in July 2013. However, in June 2014 Bannerjee quit citing health issues and was replaced by Suhasi Dhami. Mouni Roy who quit the series with the end of her role in 2012 returned as Sati in 2014.

== Home media ==
The series was released on DVD in 2014 by Ultra Media & Entertainment.

== Soundtracks ==
No.	Title	Length
1.	"Karpura Gauram Karunavataram"	6.10
2.	"Shiv Shiv (Opening Theme)"	2.46
3.	"Shankar Shiv Bhole"	4.55
4.	"Yagyaswaroopaya Mahadev"	5.18
5.	"Sarvopari Premi Shiv Shankar"	2.41
6.	"Chandrama Priytam Mere"	3.50
7.	"Har Bhola Har Har Mahadev"	2.23
8.	"Santakaaram"	2.19
9.	"Sangeet Beena"	9.15
10.	"Vishweshwaraya Mahadevaya"	4.34
11.	"Shiva Rudrastakam"	2.22
12.	"O Mere Raj Dulare"	2.27
13.	"Mere Jalandhar Mere Munna"	2.13
14.	"Ritu Basant Aa Gayi"	2.53
15.	"Mann Re Tu Kitna Bebass Hai"	4.42
16.	"Babul Ke Ghar Se Chali"	1.23
17.	"Shiv Tandav Stuti"	3.27
18.	"Maharoop Mahakaaya"	2.24
19.	"Parvati Entrance Theme"	2.32

== Reception ==
=== Ratings ===
The series started with a viewership rating of 0.7 TVR. Following which in the initial six months, it ranged between 2 and 3 TVR. Later, the episode of 9 September 2012, featuring Kali killing the demon Raktabija rated the show its highest viewership with an 8.2 TVR being the highest TVR of Hindi television program during the year.

In week 3 of 2013, it garnered an average rating of 3 TVR. In week 7, it was one of the top ten watched Hindi GEC program with 3.6 TVR.

=== Critics ===
Amar Ujala claimed that some events mentioned in the series were distorted and not mentioned in any Puranas and Shastra.

== Legacy ==
Mohit Raina featured in Limca Book of Records for the portrayal of about 52 characters in the series with his main role being Shiva.
