= Krauncha Giri =

- settlement
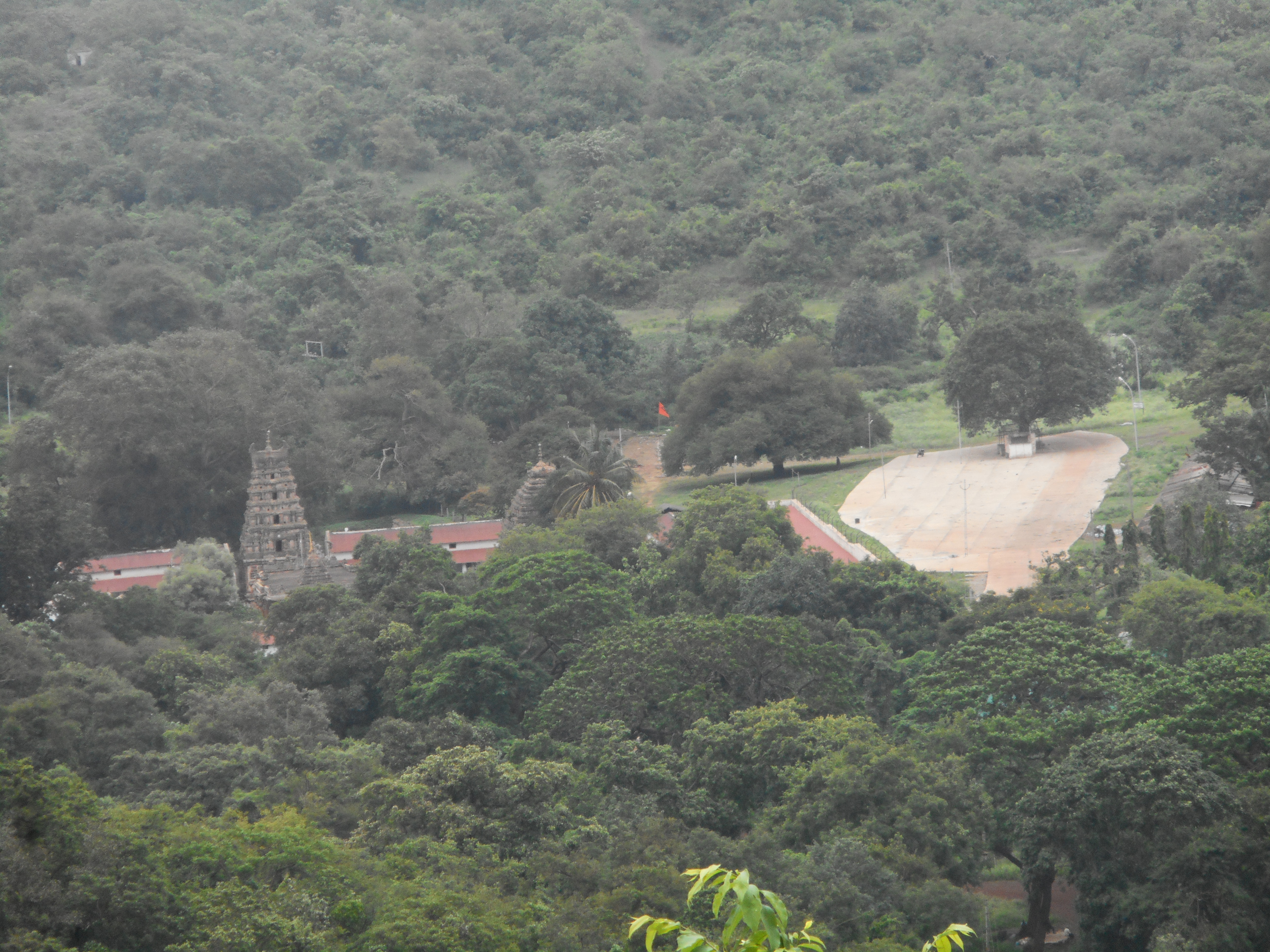

- Location in Karnataka, India Krauncha Giri (India)
- Coordinates: 15.011258°N 76.564881°E
- Country: India
- State: Karnataka
- District: Bellary
- Taluka: Sandur

Languages
  - Official: Kannada
- Time zone: UTC+5:30 (IST)

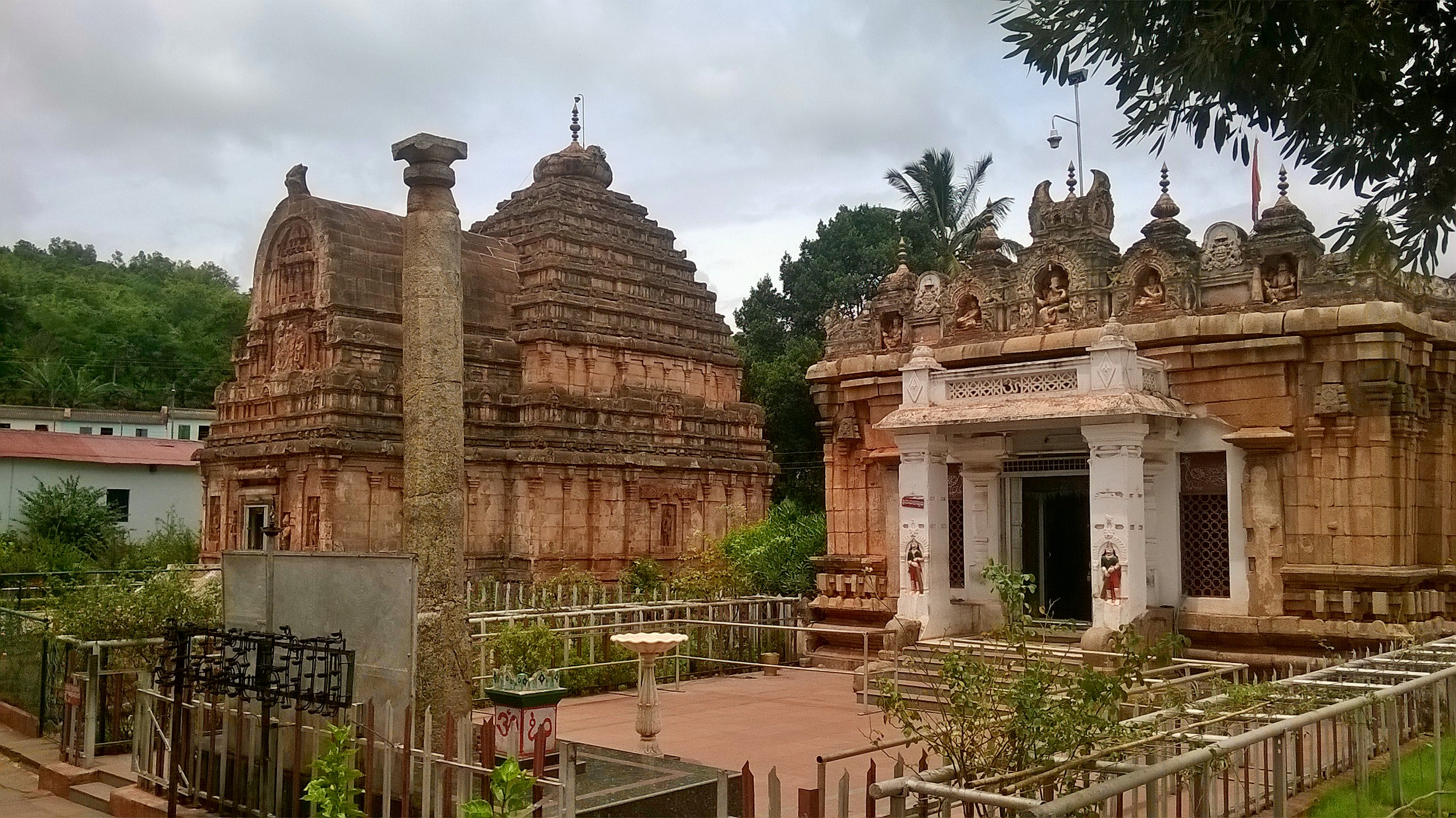
The Parvati Temple at left and Kumaraswami Temple at right

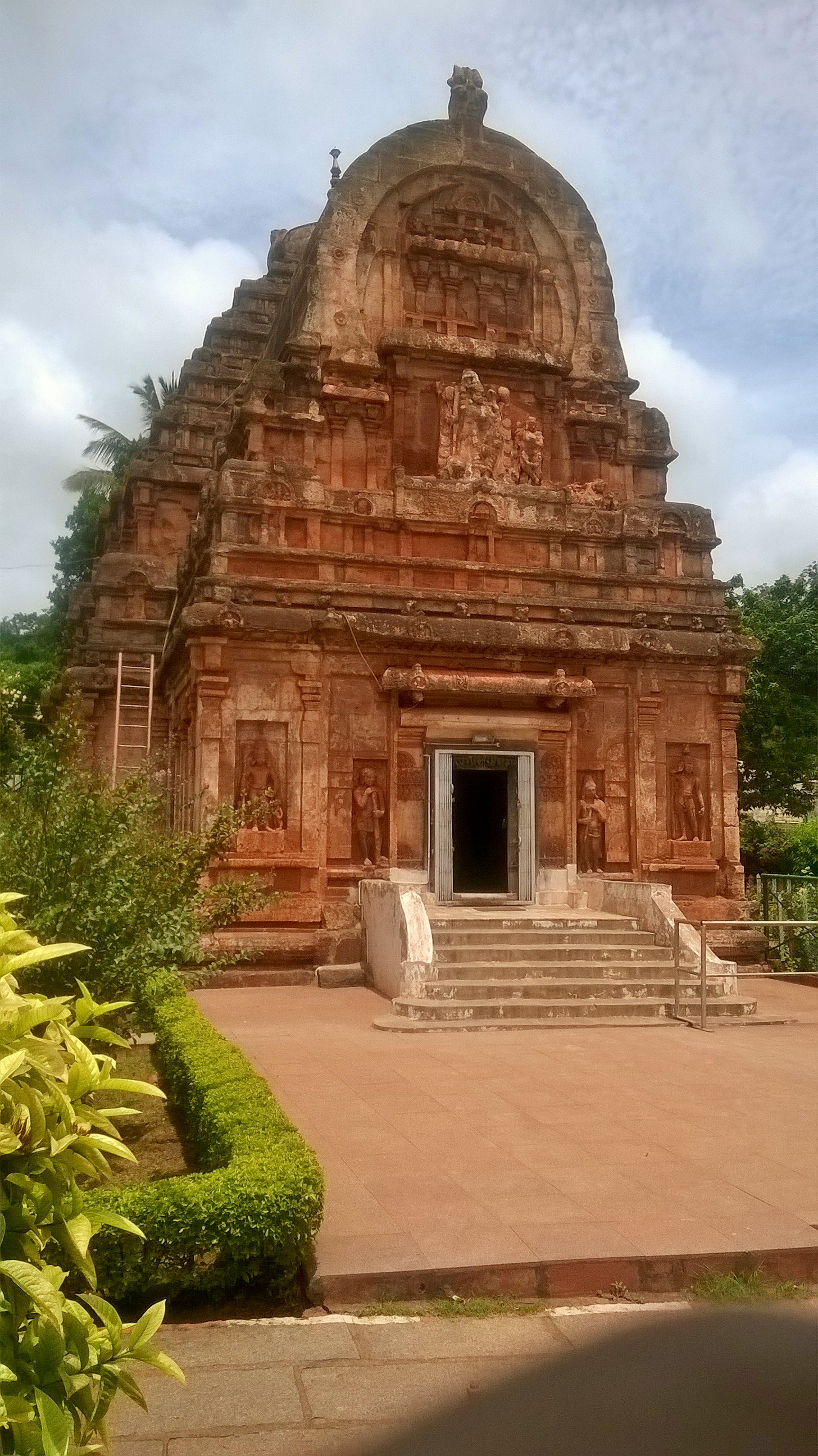
Parvati Temple

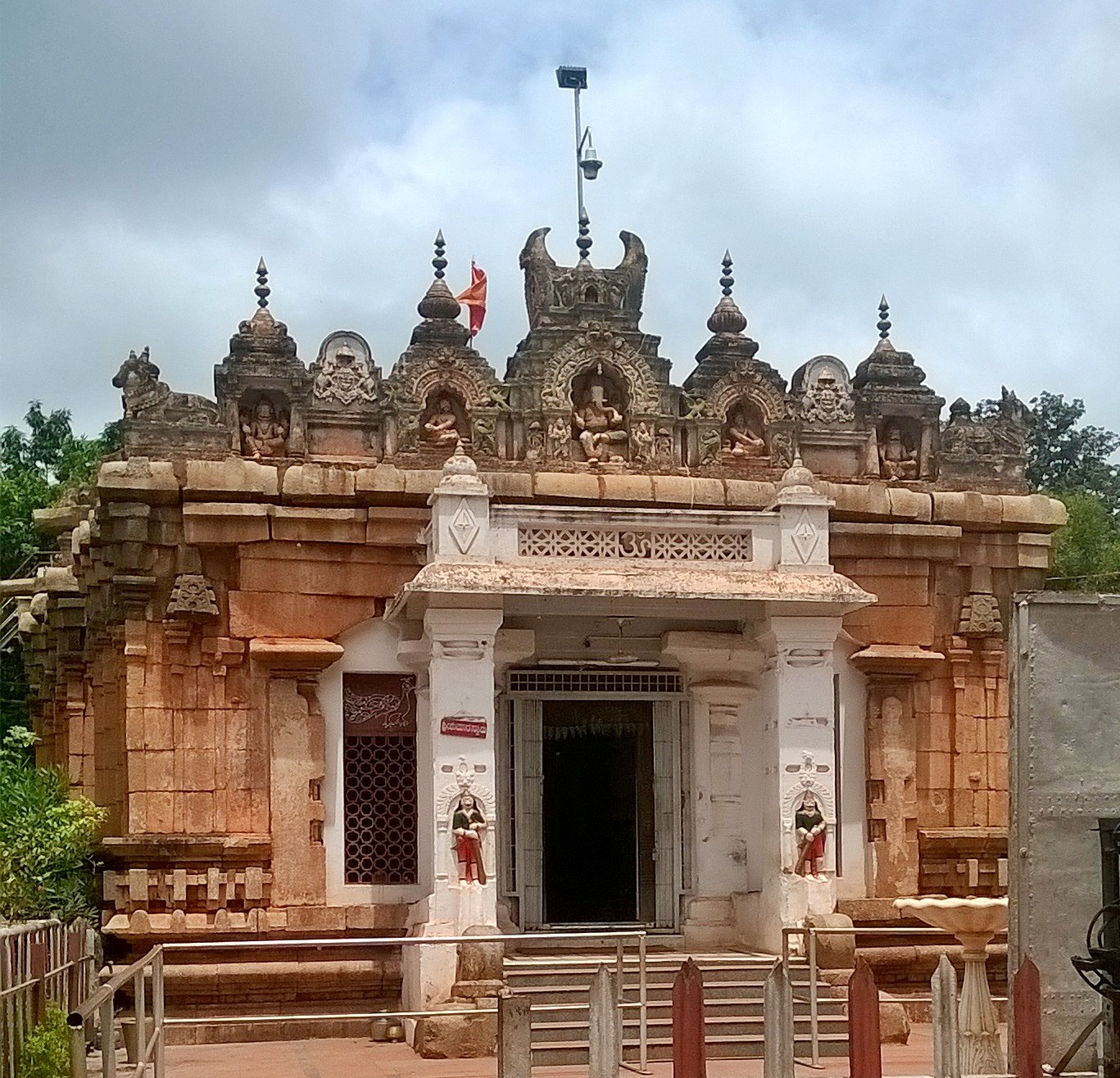
The front of the Kumaraswami Temple

Krauncha Giri is a small settlement in Karnataka, India, about 10 km from Sandur in Bellary District. It is notable for two ancient Hindu temples which are in the same compound, and are both protected monuments. The more famous in religious terms is the Kumaraswami Temple (8th-10th century), believed to be the first abode in south India of Murugan or Karthikeya, the Hindu god of war, son of Parvati and Shiva, and brother of Ganesha. To art historians the Parvati Temple beside it (7th-8th century) is the more unusual in terms of Hindu temple architecture.

== Temples ==
The complex houses temples of Parvati and Kumaraswami. The Ganesha idol in the Kumaraswami Temple is more popular these days than the main deity Kartikeya. Both monuments are now a protected monuments. It was discovered by the local rulers, the Ghorpades, in the thickly-wooded Swamimale hill in the 15th century. Women were earlier strictly not allowed to enter the shrine. Murarirao Yeshwantrao Ghorpade lifted the ban on women in October 1996. After the ban was lifted, nearly 3,000 women have worshipped at the temple.

The Ghorpades, well loved and respected by the locals, had declared the temple open to Harijans as early as the 1930s. After learning of this on his visit to Sandur in 1934, Mahatma Gandhi said, "a small state in south India has opened the temple to the Harijans, the heavens have not fallen."

=== Parvati temple ===
The Parvati temple has a number of unusual features. It apparently belongs to the "middle phase" of Badami Chalukya architecture, also called the Vesara style by some, and "Karnataka Dravida" by Adam Hardy, who sees this Deccan style as a part of the Dravidian architecture of the south, distinct from the version that developed in Tamil Nadu. The temple has no mandapa, but a long antarala, over which is, according to Adam Hardy, "possibly the first use of a sukanasa in a Dravida temple". The vimana tower over the shrine is "a very unusual composition, strangely advanced-looking in the compression of horizontal layers, and in the sense of outsurge".

According to one account, the Parvati temple (which was originally called Kumaraswamy temple) was built by the Badami Chalukyas (7th -8th century) and has the image of Parvati as the main deity.

=== Kumaraswami Temple ===
The temple currently called the Kumaraswamy temple (originally had Shanmukha as the main deity) was constructed during the rule of the Rashtrakutas (8th-10th century).

== Legends of the mountain ==
A distinctive feature of the mountain is its elliptical shape with a diametric narrow pass. According to legend, this gap is made when Kartikeya pierced the mountain in the battle with the demon Tharaka, with his spear weapon vel to kill the demons who were hidden inside mountain. This legend is held in high esteem in Hindu mythologies including Mahabharata (salya parva. 46), Skanda Purana (asura kandam). Krauncha Giri is also associated with legends of the sages Agastya and Parasuram.

Kalidasa in his work Megha Sandesa describes the gap in the mountain. This place is connected with legends of Sri Sailam jyotirlinga in Andhra Pradesh. The name 'Krauncha Giri' is very familiar to many, but few know the location of this legendary mountain. For many, it's just a mythical one like Mount Meru.

== Swamimale forest range ==
According to geologists, this peculiar mountain is made of volcanic eruptions and is very rich in mineral deposits. The soil and lake here is red marshy that owes to presence of rich ferrous deposits. Nowadays due to mindless mining in this area is resulting in habitat destruction.

Many plant species such as Strobilanthes kunthiana (neela kurunji) is found in the shola type grasslands of mountains, many birds such as orange-headed thrush, tickell's blue flycatcher, Indian pitta, verditer flycatcher, spot-brested fantail, yellow throated bulbul, spotted dove, red whiskered bulbul, oriental white eye, brown-headed barbet, puff-throated babbler, blue-capped rockthrush, red breasted flycatcher etc. Many more birds species of western ghats can be found here. It is a good habitate for many species of orchids too. The place is filled with dense green forests which normally resemble the rainforests of western ghat.

Though the place is in a hot area, because of high mountains it is always cool, many cool atmosphere-loving species of plants and fungi such as mosses, ferns, lichens, mushrooms, toad stools tinder fungus, puff ball fungus, thrive here, giving boost to many shade loving insects reptiles. Trees such as rosewood, sandalwood, teak wood, etc. flourish in forests. This centuries old temple complex is located inside Swamimalai forest range and is said to be infested with venomous snakes like russell viper and spectacled cobras. Peacocks are also a very common sight here. The forest range is also a very good habitat of leopards. Tigers roamed in the forests until 1960. But due to hunting habitat loss due to mining, they were swept away.

== Transport ==
Karnataka State highway No.40 pass through the above said gap in mountain, connecting Sandur to rest of the State. Temple is approachable by road from Sandur. Nearest Rail Heads are Hospet& Bellary on Guntakal-Hubli line. The temple complex is located on south-west corner and is connected to Sandur by road.

== Notes ==
2. Google Maps
