= Vishal Singh =

Vishal Singh may refer to:

- Vishal Singh (actor, born 1974), Indian actor known for Dekh Bhai Dekh
- Vishal Singh (actor, born 1985), Indian actor known for Kuchh Is Tara
- Vishal Singh (cricketer) (born 1993), Indian cricketer
- Vishal Singh (polo player), Indian polo player
- Vishal Singh (social worker), Indian social worker
- Vishal Aditya Singh (born 1989), Indian actor known for Begusarai
- Vishal Singh Yadav (born 1967), Indian cricketer

== See also ==
- Vishal (name)
- List of people with surname Singh
- Vishal Sangh, a cane farmers union established 1946 in Fiji
