= Virat Singh =

Indian cricketer (born 1997)

Personal information
- Full name: Virat Binod Singh
- Born: December 8, 1997 (age 28); Jamshedpur, Bihar, India (now Jharkhand)
- Batting: Left-handed
- Bowling: Right-arm offbreak
- Role: Batter

Domestic team information
- Years: Team
- 2014–present: Jharkhand
- 2021: Sunrisers Hyderabad
- FC debut: 14 December 2014 Jharkhand v Assam
- LA debut: 3 March 2014 Jharkhand v Bengal
- Source: Cricinfo, May 2025

Virat Binod Singh (born 8 December 1997) is an Indian professional cricketer. He is the captain of Jharkhand Cricket Team.

== Career ==
From Jamshedpur, which was part of Bihar at the time of his birth, Virat made his debut for the Jharkhand under-19s at the age of 14, in the 2012–13 edition of the Vinoo Mankad Trophy. He scored 152 runs from five innings in the tournament, behind only his older brother, Vishal Singh (179), and Shasheem Rathour (280). He scored a half-century, 73 runs from 98 balls, against Assam, and also topscored in Jharkhand's quarter-final loss to Maharashtra. Following his good form for his state, Virat was selected to play in the 2012–13 BCCI interzonal competition, alongside his brother Vishal. His best performance was an innings of 78 against Central Zone, which was the highest score by an East Zone player at the tournament. Virat again played under-19 matches for Jharkhand and East Zone during the 2013–14 season, and captained Jharkhand in that season's Cooch Behar Trophy, despite being only 15 at the start of the tournament. He led East Zone in runs in the interzonal one-day tournament, with a best of 146 not out against West Zone, and did the same for Jharkhand in the four-day Cooch Behar Trophy, finishing with 508 runs from five matches. This included two centuries – 120* against Assam, and 190 against Andhra.

Later in the 2013–14 season, in March 2014, Virat was selected to make his senior debut for Jharkhand, playing in the limited-overs Vijay Hazare Trophy. He played all five of Jharkhand's matches in the tournament as the team progressed to the semifinals, and scored two half-centuries – 76 against Bengal and 53 against Assam. Virat's one-day form gained him a place in Jharkhand's team at the Syed Mushtaq Ali Trophy the following month, India's interstate twenty20 competition. There, he was less successful, with only 90 runs from seven innings and a strike rate of 84.90. He did topscore against Orissa, making 40 runs from 45 balls as Jharkhand lost by four runs. Virat retained in spot in Jharkhand's senior team for the 2014–15 season, while still playing at domestic under-19 level with the aim of qualifying for the Indian under-19 team. He made his Ranji Trophy debut in December 2014, against Assam, and scored a maiden first-class century in his second match, an even 100 against Kerala. While he was on 99, there was a stumping appeal, which the third umpire took several minutes to adjudicate as not out. Virat also made his senior debut for East Zone later in the season, and scored 54 runs in the final of the limited-overs Deodhar Trophy. This included a 135-run third-wicket partnership with Manoj Tiwary, with East Zone going on to win the final by 24 runs, its first Deodhar Trophy since the 2003–04 season.

In October 2019, he was named in India C's squad for the 2019–20 Deodhar Trophy. He was bought by Sunrisers Hyderabad for a price of ₹1.90 crore for the 2020 Indian Premier League.
