= Bucesvara Temple, Koravangala =

Būcēśwara Temple
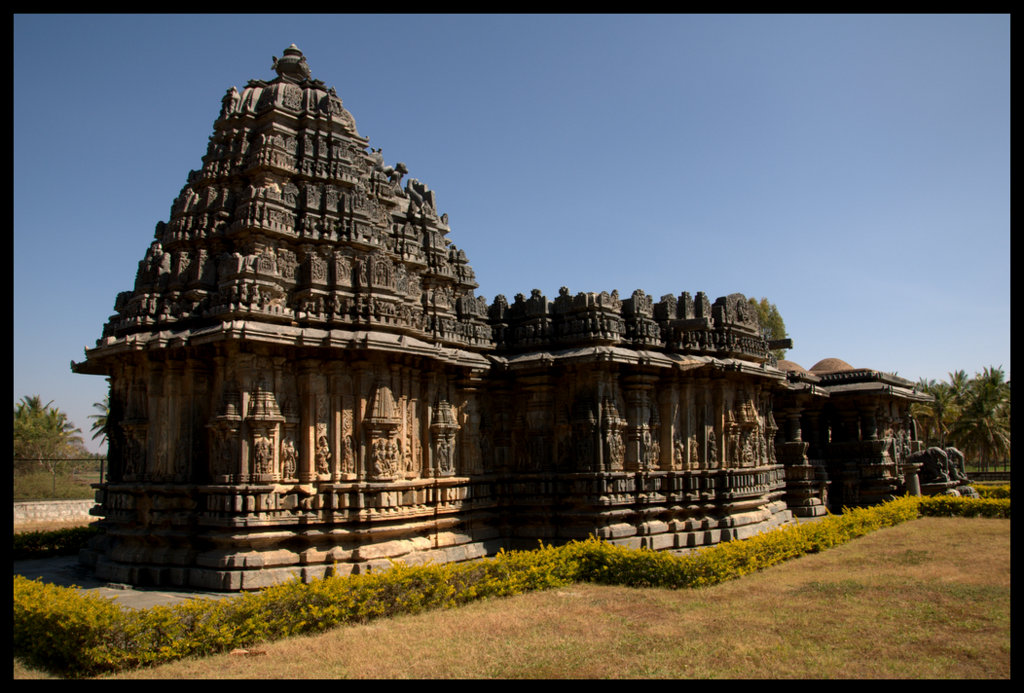

- Location within India Location within Karnataka

Religion
- Affiliation: Hinduism
- District: Hassan
- Deity: Shiva

Location
- Location: Koravangala village
- State: Karnataka
- Country: India
- Interactive map of Būcēśwara Temple
- Coordinates: 13°03′11.9″N 76°10′37.4″E

Architecture
- Type: Hoysala
- Creator: Buchi
- Completed: 12th-century CE

Bucesvara temple, also referred to as the Buceswara, Bucheshwara or Bhucheshvara temple, is a 12th-century Hindu temples in Koravangala village, Karnataka, India. The most sophisticated historical temple in the village, it is considered to be the flag-bearer of Hoysala architecture and was built by a wealthy patron named Buchi during the reign of king Ballala.

It is a twin temple with the two sanctums facing each other. The sanctum next to the larger mandapa opens to the east and is dedicated to Shiva, while the other near the two entrances is dedicated to Surya. Artworks of Shaivism, Vaishnavism, Shaktism and the Vedic deities are reverentially displayed, along with panels depicting scenes from the Ramayana, the Mahabharata, the Bhagavata Purana. Also included are scenes of artha and kama (mithuna, amorous couples).

The temple is protected as a monument of national importance by the Archaeological Survey of India.

== Location and date ==
It is located in the village of Korvangla, about 12 kilometres (7 mi) northeast from Hassan city in Karnataka, India. It is about 35 kilometres (22 mi) southwest of Halebidu (Dorasamudra) – the primary capital of Hoysala kingdom in the 12th-century.

The temple is to the north of the village and was built in 1173 CE by a rich officer called Buci (or Buchiraja). The inscription states that it marks the coronation of Hoysala King Veera Ballala II. Koravangala was a major town in pre-14th century Karnataka, featuring at least six temples on the eastern banks of a manmade lake:

- Two temples are within the Buceswara temple prakara (compound), these were built about 1173 CE; the second temple is to the eastern end of the complex and to the north of main temple; it is a smaller and simpler Bhairava temple, a form of the Hindu god Shiva.
- Three temples are to the north of Bucesvara temple – Govindesvara temple (Shiva), Nakesvara temple (Shiva) and a Surya temple, completed between 1160 and 1170 CE
- One is almost totally ruined and to the east-northeast, likely also late 12th-century (it is unclear to whom this was dedicated)

From the inscriptions found near these temples, it is evident that the northernmost temples here are about 15 to 20 years older than the Buchesvara temple. They were commissioned by Buci's older brothers, Govinda and Naka.

== Architecture ==
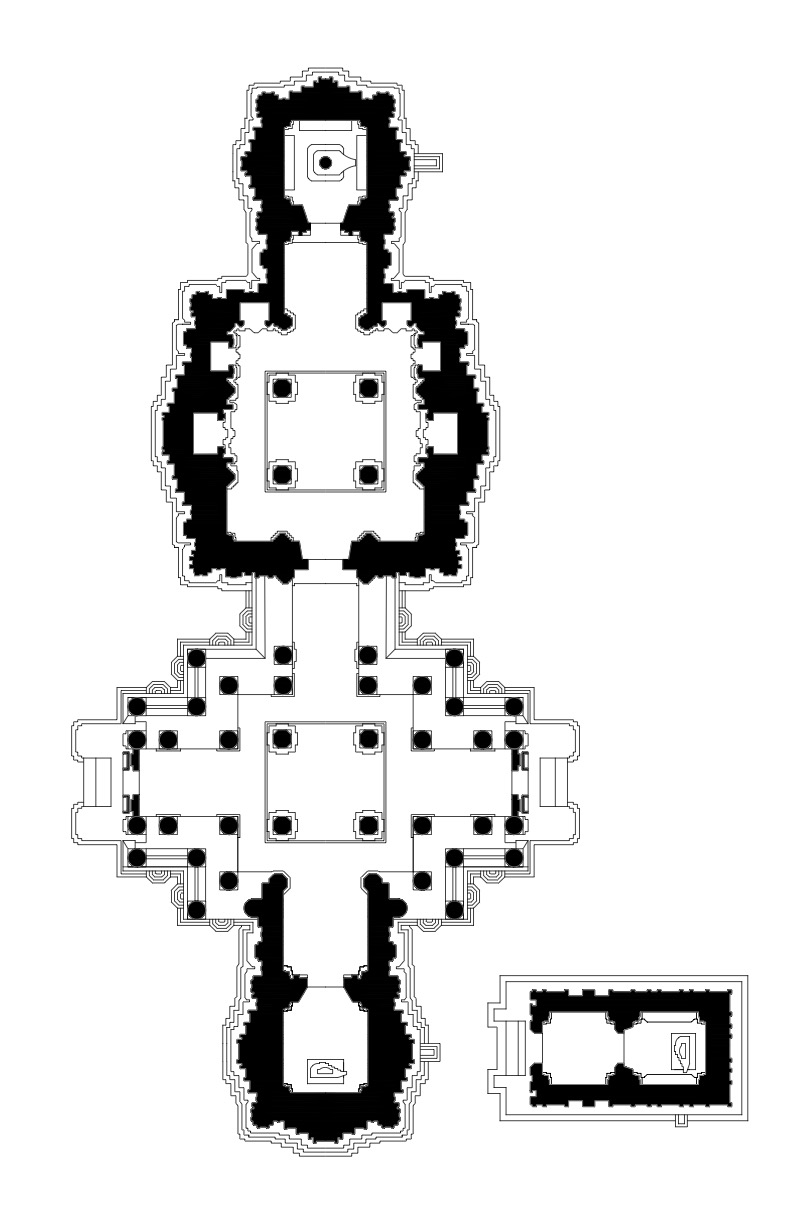
Floor plan of Buchesvara temple, Koravangala. The axis of the main temple is aligned east–west.

All temples in this village follow the square plan per the classical Sanskrit texts on Hindu architecture. The most sophisticated of these is the Bucesvara temple, which is more massive and better preserved. Dhaky – a scholar known for his studies on Indian temple architecture, states that the Bucesvara is "in severak respects a truly notable building".

It is a dvikuta (two shrines) that face each other. These shrines are connected by a closed mantapa (hall) and an open mantapa. At the eastern end of the complex and to the north of main temple is a smaller and simpler Bhairava temple, a form of the Hindu god Shiva. In the main interconnected long temple, the sanctum contains an image of Surya (the Sun god in Hinduism). Foekema calls this as the "staggered square plan" or the "cross in square", a square with three projections per side. The main large shrine is dedicated to Shiva.

The temple consists of tritala vimana (three storey sanctum superstructure), a gudha-mandapa and a ranga-mandapa. The vimana consists of karnas, kutastambhas, bhadras and a kapili. The shikara is beautifully executed with detailed carving, a fine example of Nataraja with the Hoysala crest, and near perfect kalasa at the very top. On the walls is a balanced display of the Hindu traditions – Shaivism, Vaishnavism and Shaktism.

The eastern shrine, which contains a Shiva linga has a similar plan; a Sukhanasi (called "nose") which is a low protrusion of the tower over the shrine and is built over the vestibule which connects the vimana (cella) to the hall. The halls are adjoining. The ceiling art in the open hall is of fine quality and the pillars have a glossy finish. The pillars of the mantapa (hall) are bell shaped, a design achieved by turning with lathes.

According to Foekema, the temple decorative feature pre-Hoysala style, that is those prevalent before the Hoysala times. In this type of decoration, below the superstructure (tower), an eaves that projects about half a meter runs all around the temple. Below the eaves are decorative miniature towers (the aedicula) on pilasters. The miniature towers (turrets) are in various styles; nagara, dravida, vesara, and bhumija. The large wall images of deities and their attendants are placed below these decorative towers.

These images include among others: Bhairava (a version of the god Shiva), the goddess Saraswati and Durga, Maheshvara, Narasimha, Brahma, and Venugopala. Below these images, the base of the wall comprises five different horizontal moldings, one of which is a row of blocks.

The three niches on the south side have survived, and these show Saptamatrikas, Ganesha and Saraswati. The north side niches contained reliefs too, but are now empty.

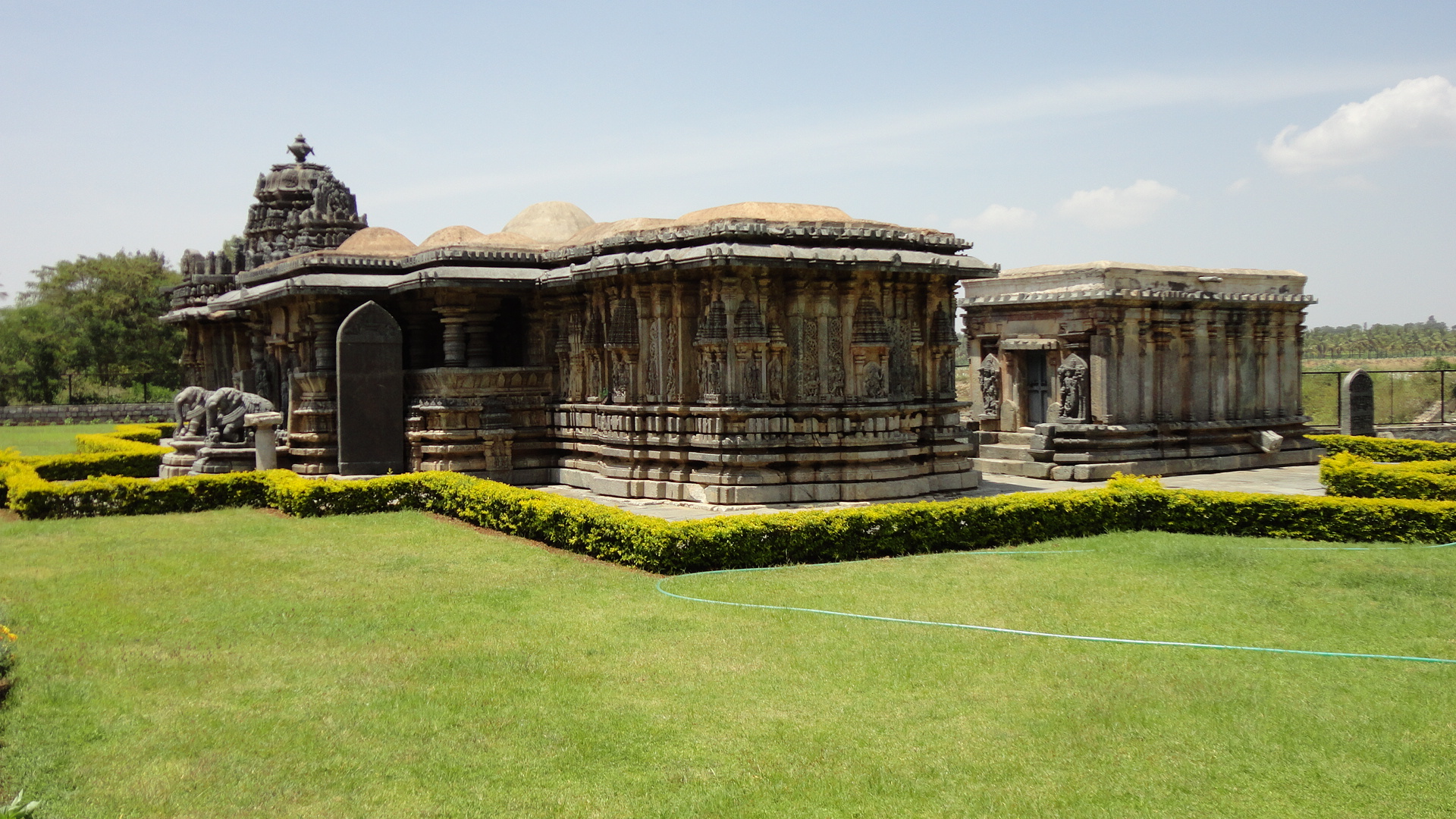
Bucesvara temple with the Bhairava shrine to the side. Only one tower has survived.

== Gallery ==
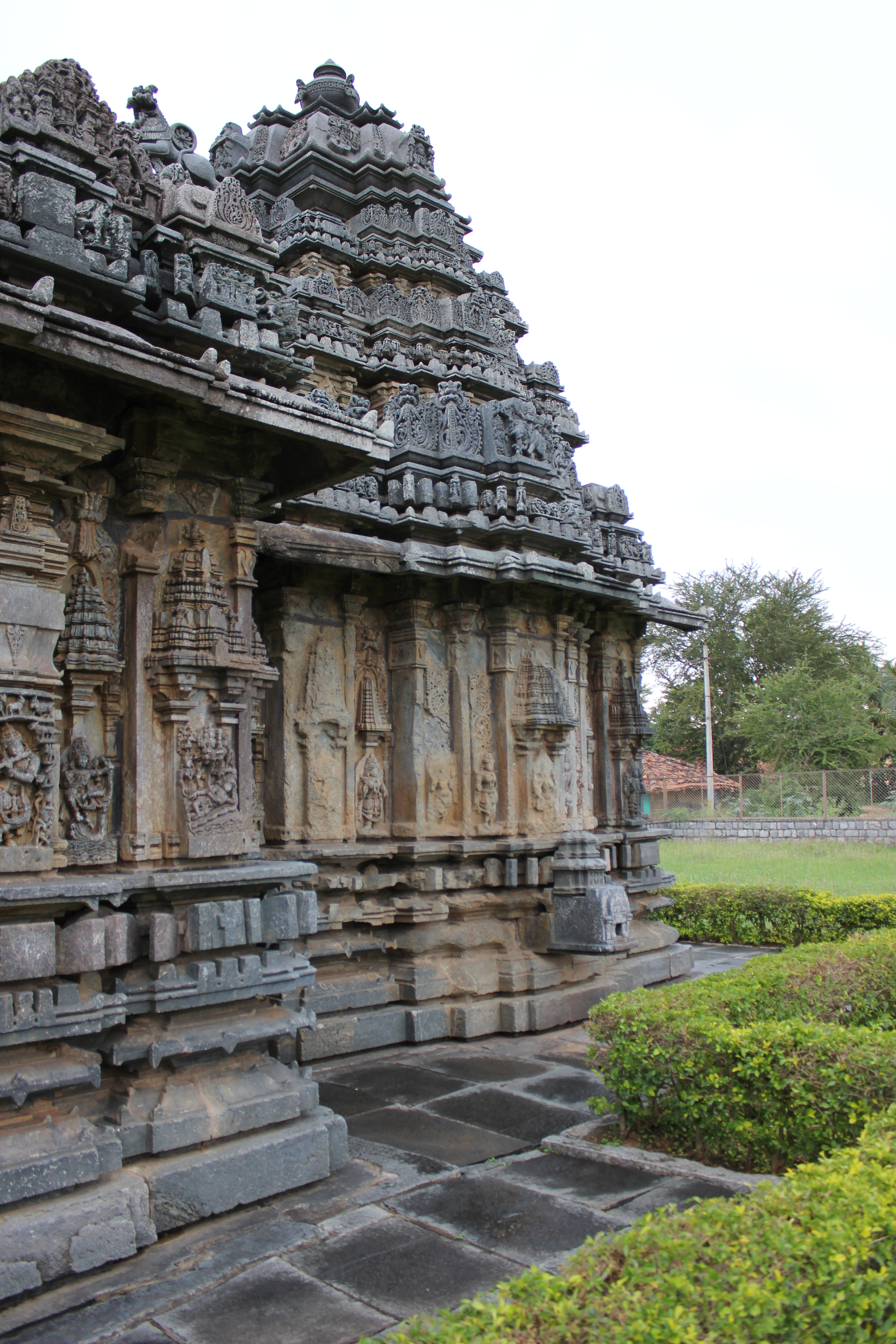
Close up profile of shrine and its superstructure (shikhara)

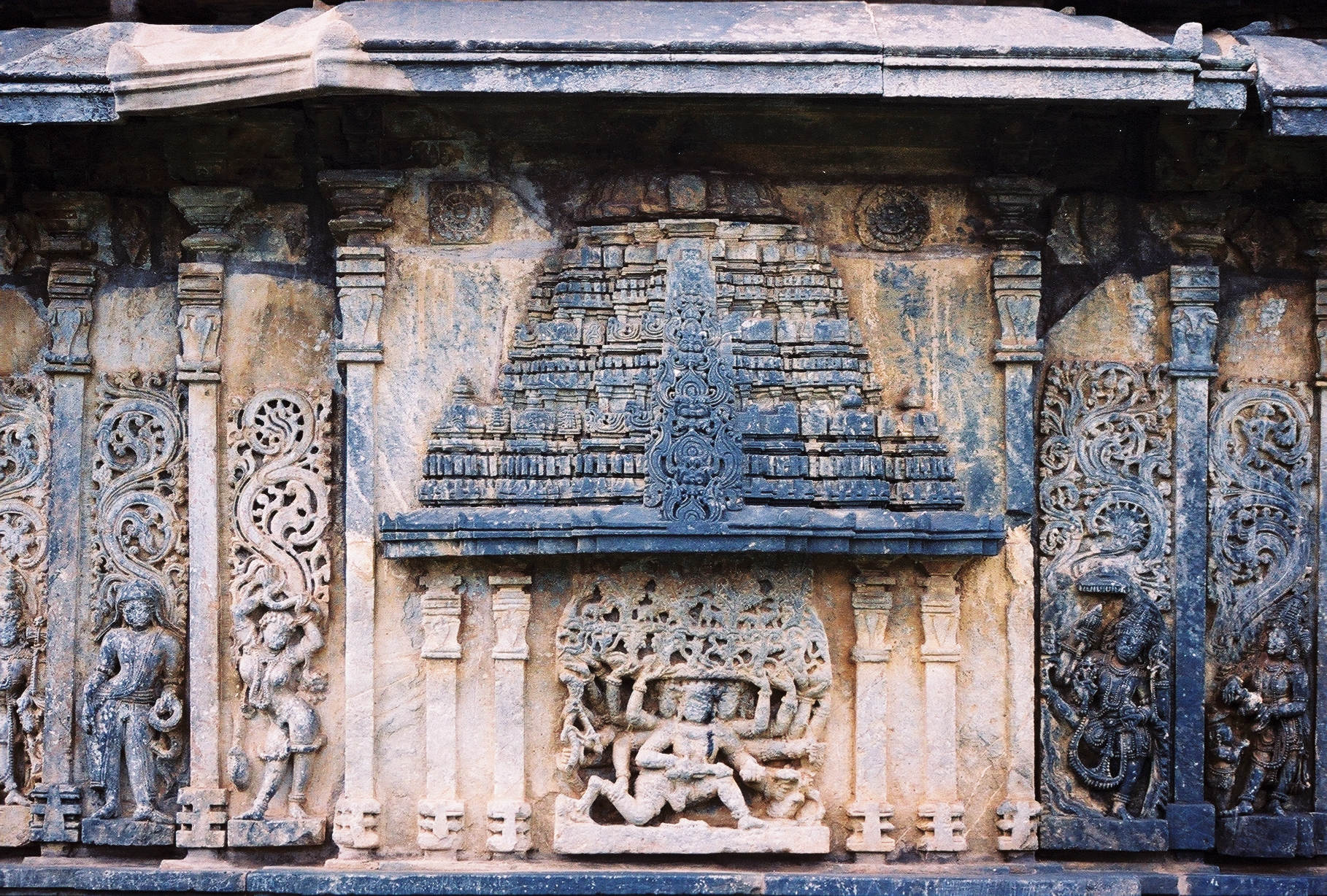
An aedicula bounded by decorative swirls in bas-relief

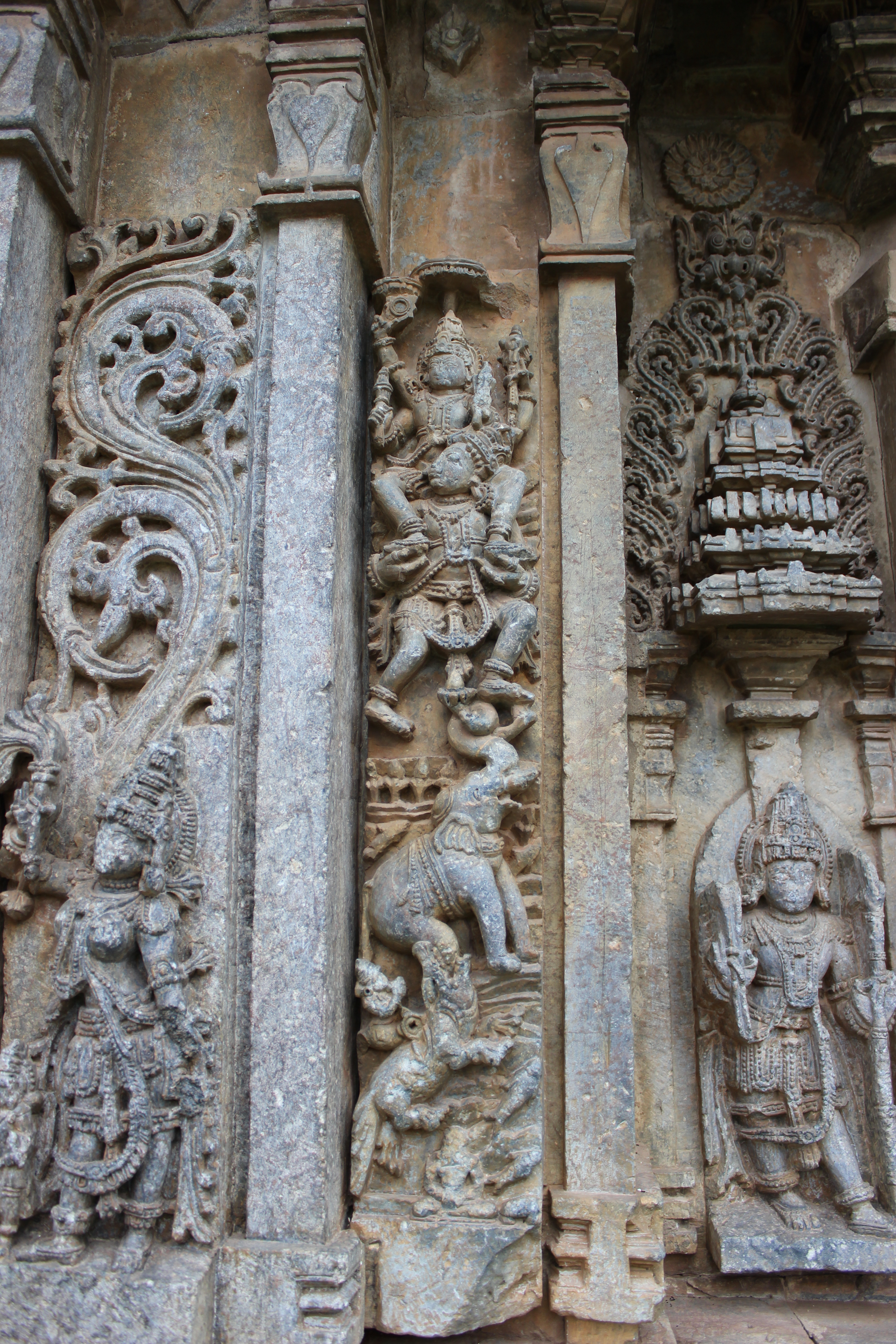
Wall bas-relief depicting Vishnu carried by Garuda

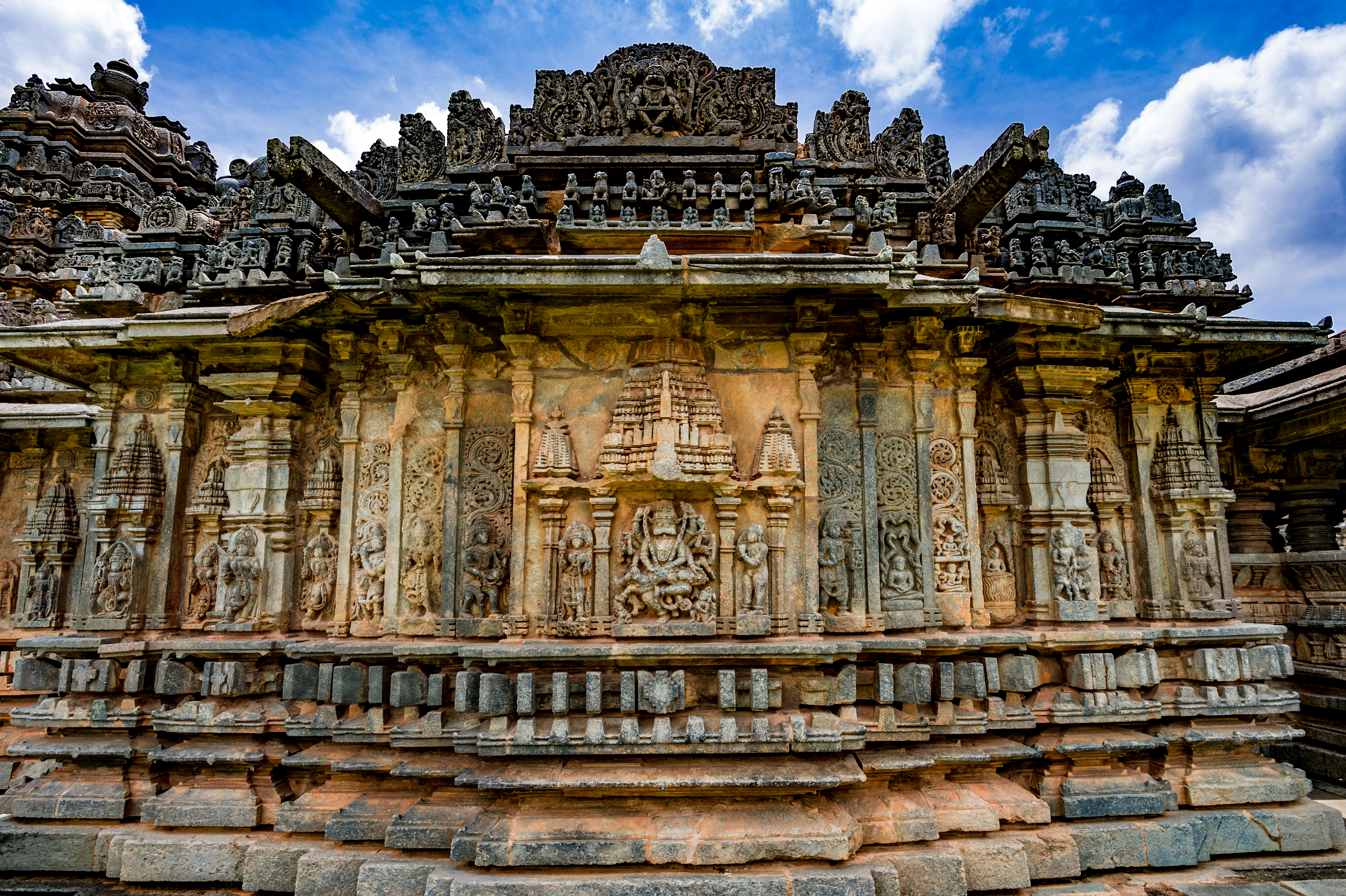
Narasimha avatar of Vishnu in the center

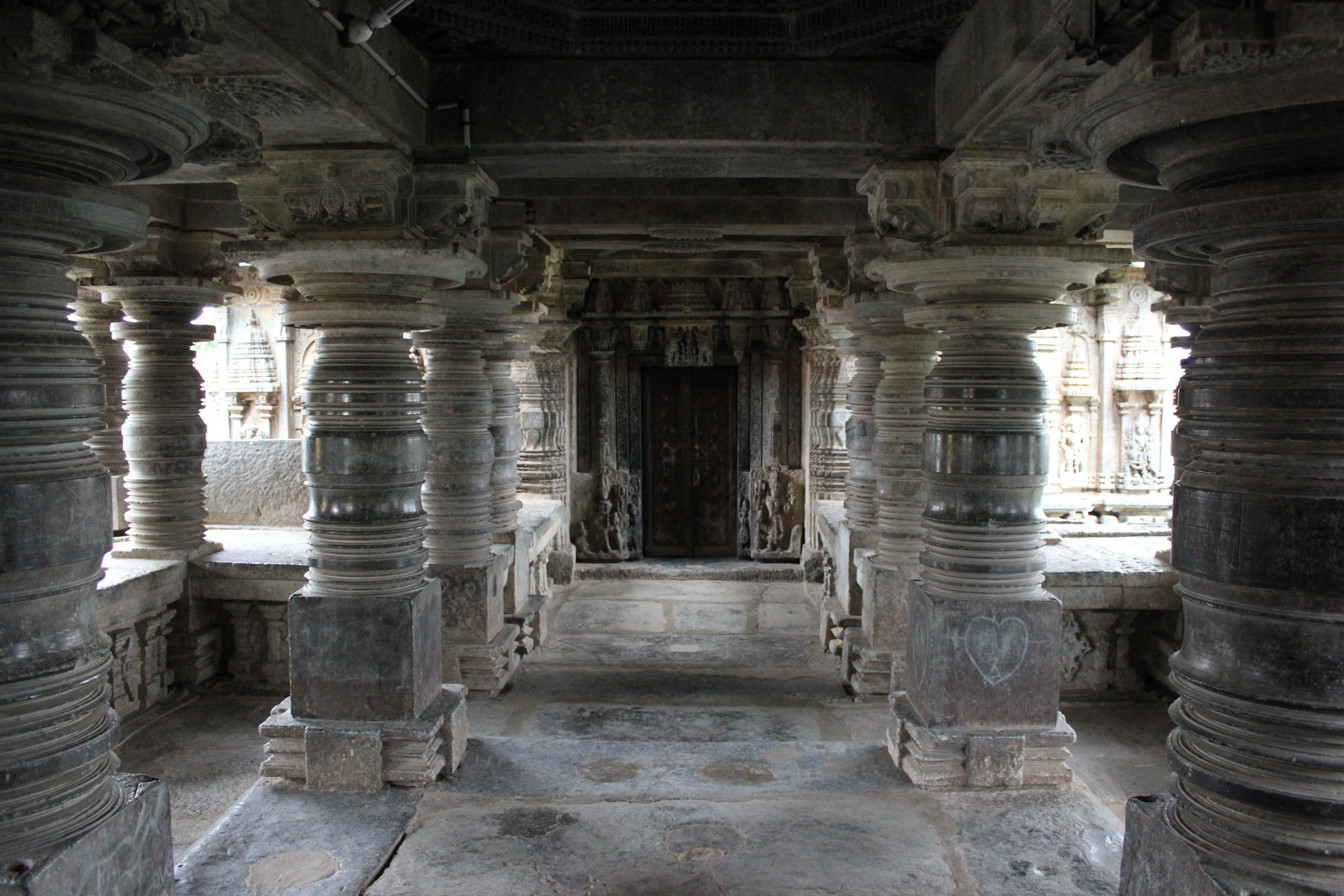
Lathe turned pillars inside the mahamantapa (open hall)

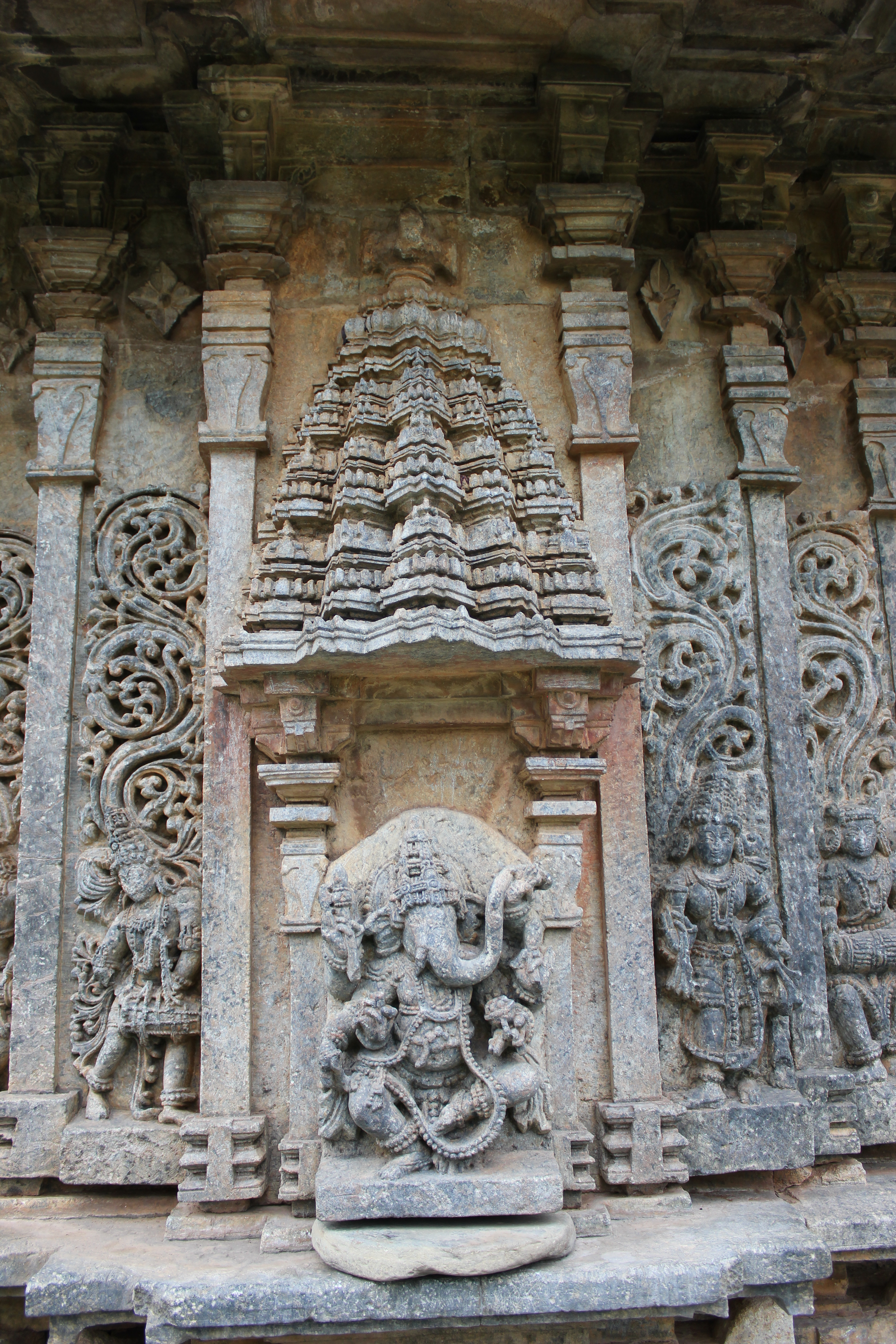
Shrine outer wall relief

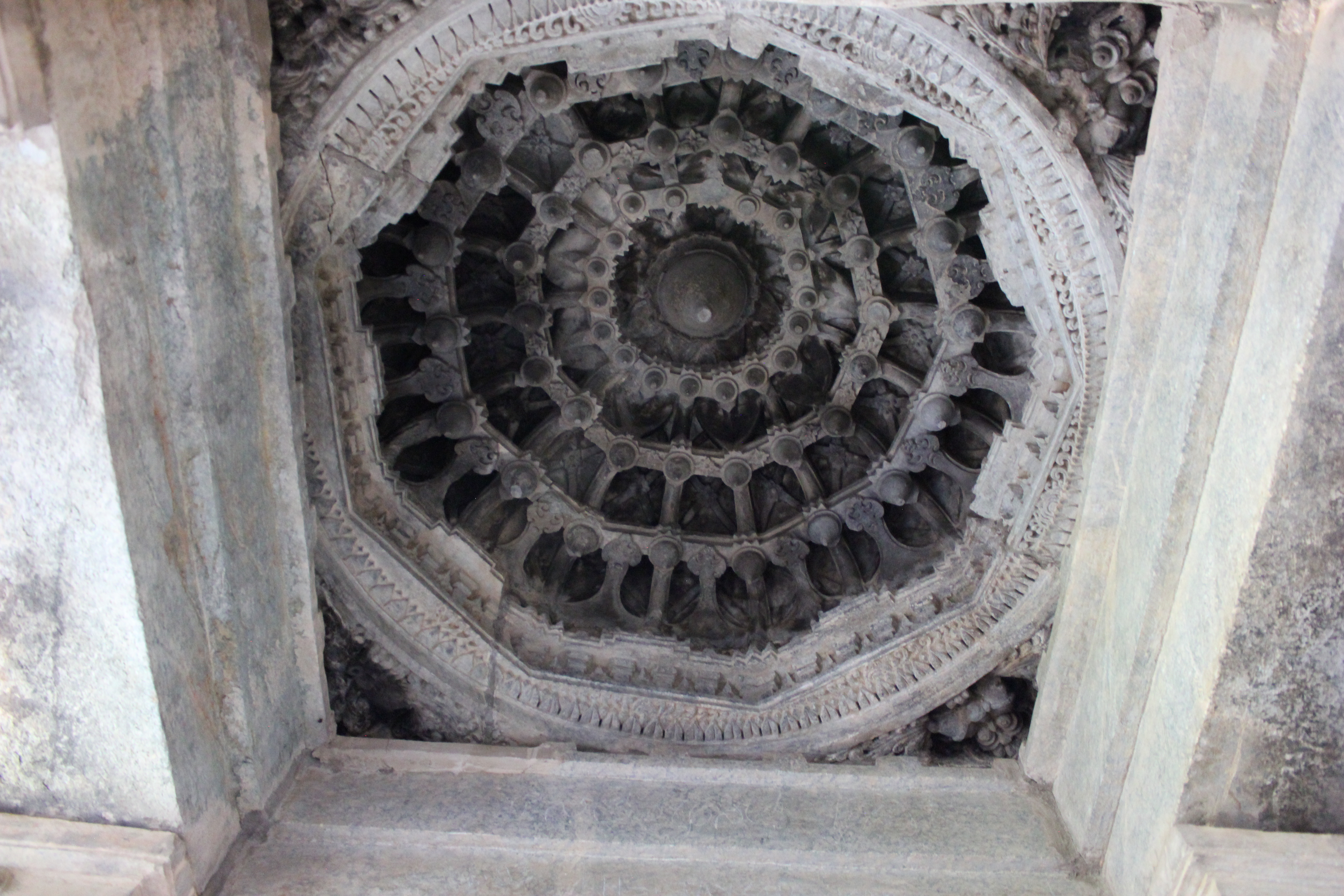
Ceiling with lotus

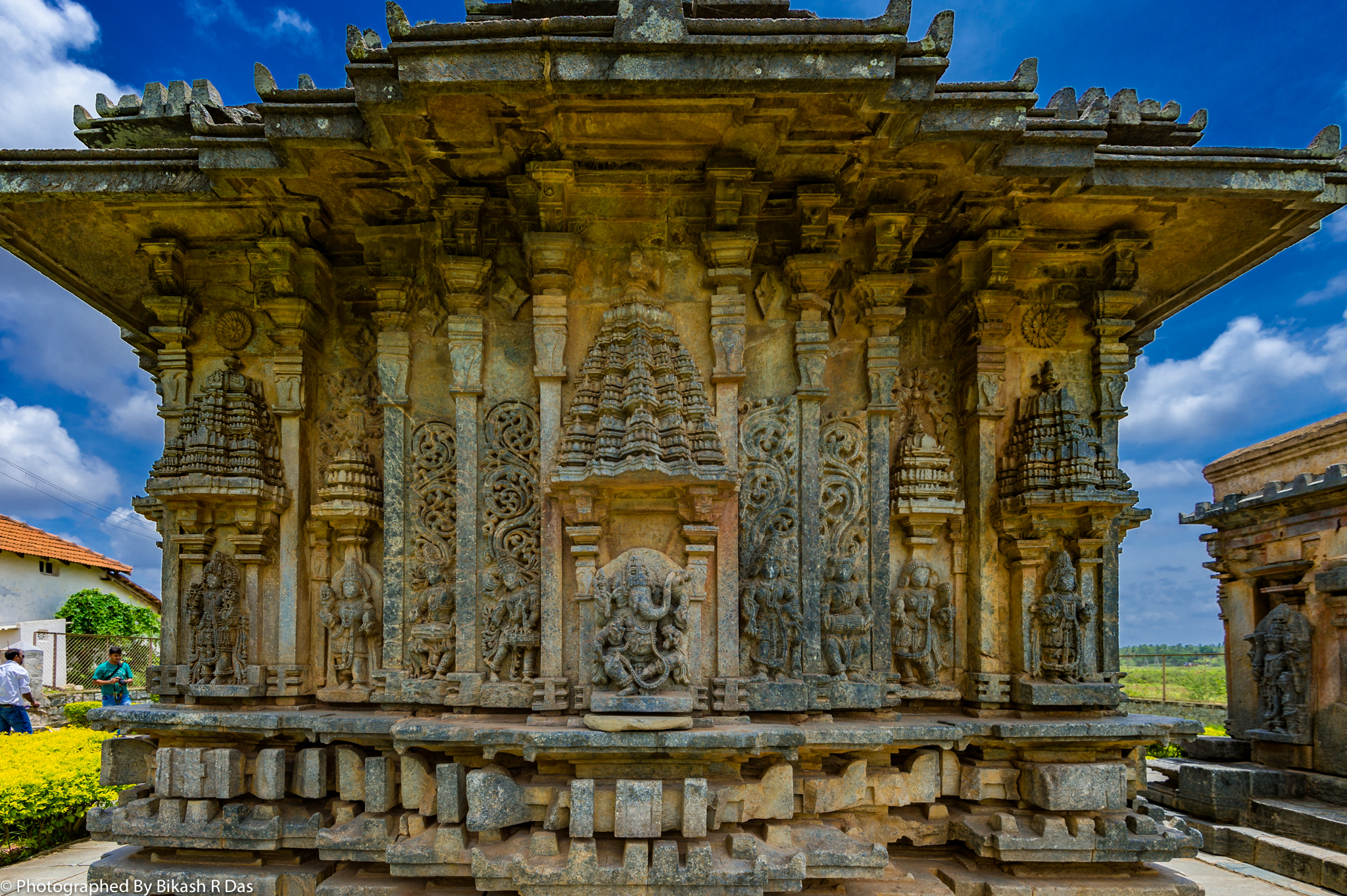
Dancing Ganesha at the center

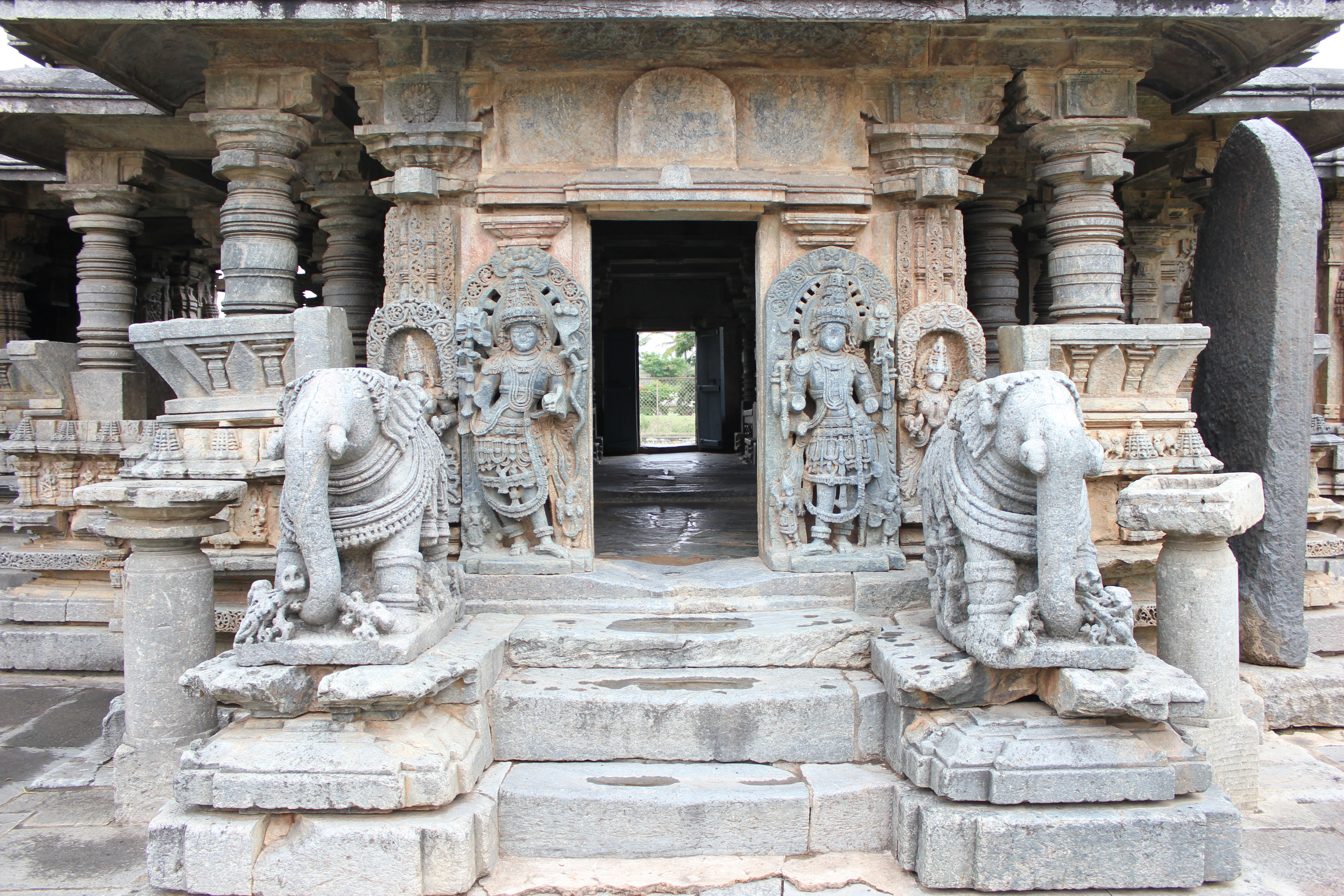
Elephant baluster, one of two entrances

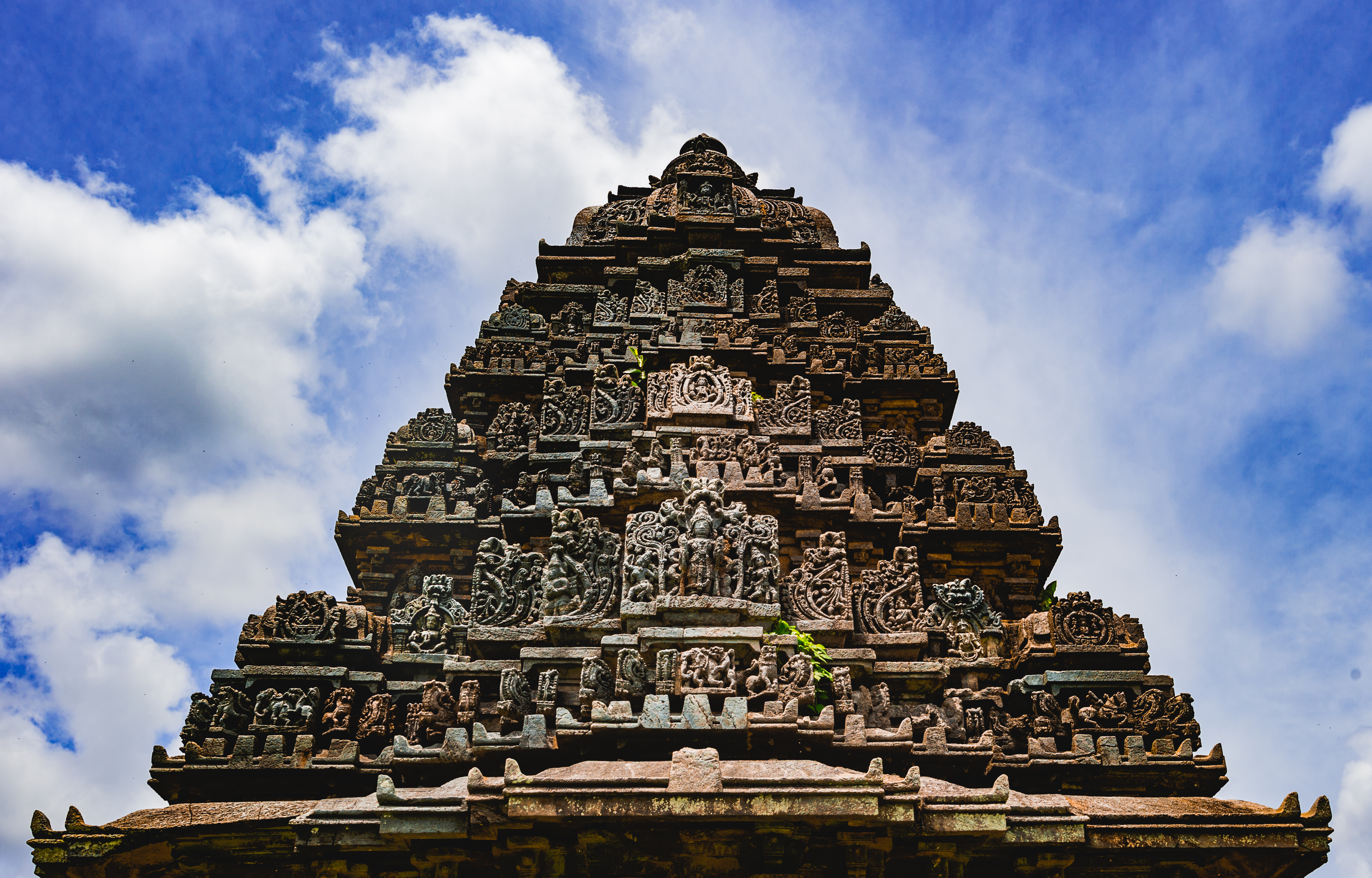
Ornate tower superstructure

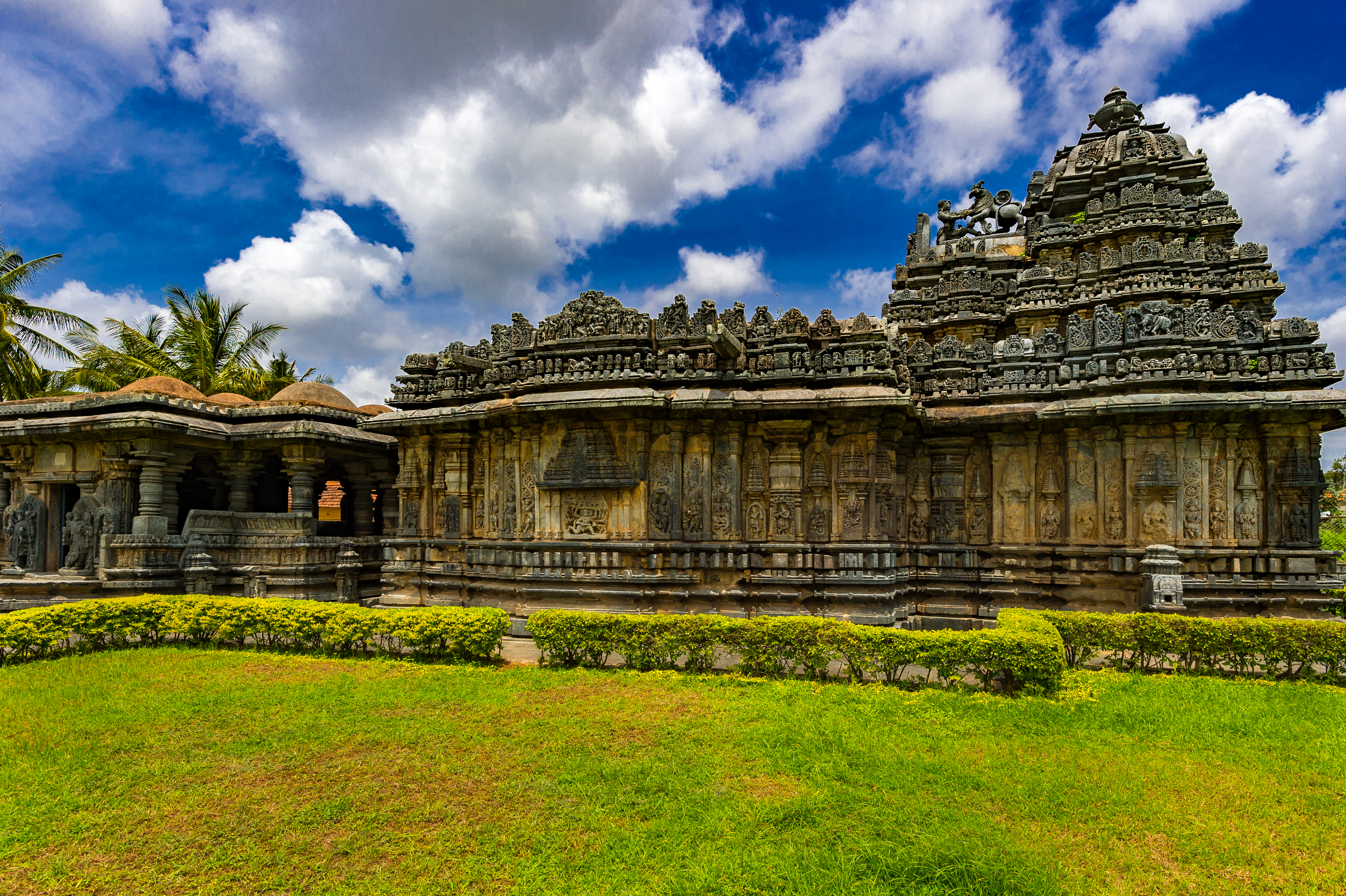
Side View

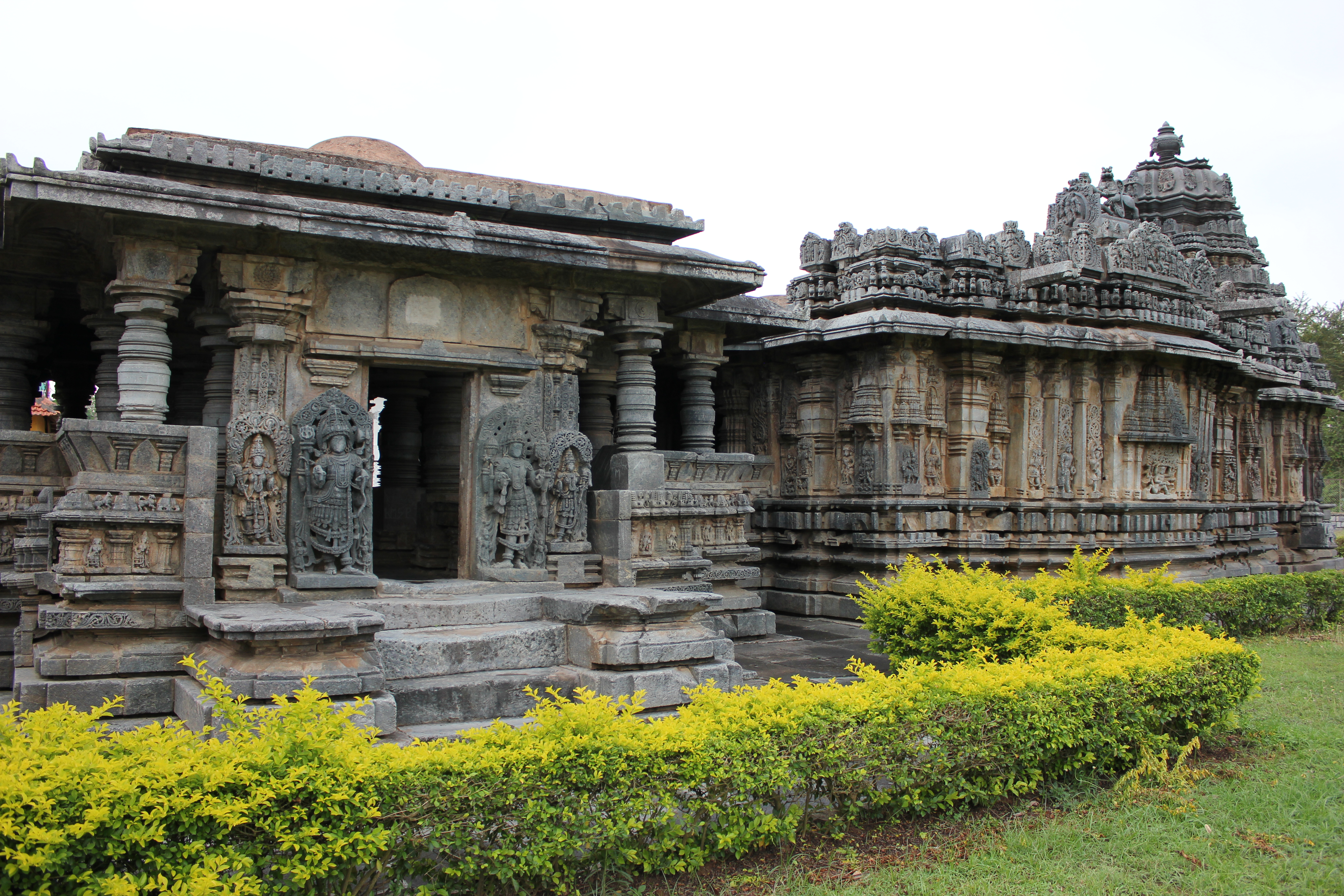
South-west corner view
