= Tharaka =

Mythological king from Sri Lanka

Tharaka was a mythological king from Sri Lanka.

According to legend, he designed the craft "Dandu Monara", which was able to fly, but he was unable to build it. Instead the King Ravana built it, and stories from the Ramayana tell of him using it to abduct Queen Seetha from Rama.
