= Pitamber =

Pitamber may refer to:

- Pitamber Das, Indian politician
- Pitambar Tarai, Oriya poet
- Pitambar Deva Goswami, Assamese social reformer
- Pitambar Charairongba, Hindu ruler of Manipur
- Pitambar Paswan, Indian politician
- Nilamber-Pitamber University in Jharkhand
- Pitambar, a 1992 Bollywood film
- Pitambar Chapter-1, Nepali movie.
