= Vishal Singh (cricketer) =

Indian cricketer (born 1993)

Personal information
- Born: 27 December 1993 (age 32); Patna, India
- Batting: Right-handed
- Role: Batsman
- Relatives: Virat Singh (brother)

Domestic team information
- Years: Team
- 2014: Jharkhand
- Source: ESPNcricinfo, 10 January 2016

Vishal Singh (born 27 December 1993) is an Indian cricketer who plays for Jharkhand. He made his List A debut on 13 November 2014 in the 2014–15 Vijay Hazare Trophy. He studied at Bharat Sevashram Pranav Children Worlds, Sonari.
