= Vishal Singh (social worker) =

Indian social worker (born 1980)

Vishal Singh (Food Man)
- Born: 19 March 1980 (age 46); New Delhi, India
- Citizenship: Indian
- Occupation: Social Worker
- Organization: Vijay Sri Foundation
- Known for: Food Man

Vishal Singh (born 19 March 1980) is an Indian social worker. His organization serves almost 900 patients at three hospitals daily. In addition to Balrampur Hospital, Singh runs a similar free kitchen at King George's Medical University (KGMU) and at Dr Ram Manohar Lohia hospital.

== Early life ==
Singh was born in 1980 in New Delhi. He worked at a parking lot in Hazratganj. He scavenged through trash cans for food. He opened a tea and snacks stall.

In the winter of 2003, Singh's father was admitted to a private hospital in Gurgaon, and the medical authorities asked for an over ₹50,000 deposit to continue his treatment. Singh decided to feed hungry relatives of patients. He sent out 100 food packets each to KGMU and Balrampur Hospital. In 2015, he entered the real estate business and launched a free food service.

== Career ==
In 2007, Singh set up the Vijay Sri Foundation where patients at three hospitals are served a daily meal. The Foundation cooks and serves food, while the selection of the beneficiaries is done by the hospital. Every day, around 300 food coupons are issued to each hospital, and the medical staff distributes them to those attendants who need them. People come in queues and submit coupons to get food.

In 2020, Singh set up a free night shelter (raen basera) at The King George's Medical University (KGMU). The capacity of a homeless shelter is 400 people.

Singh helped thousands of people during the second COVID-19 wave with oxygen supply and free food services at the DRDO Covid hospital.

During the last phase of the pandemic, Singh and his 25 workers served 7.5 lakh food packets through the district administration. Appreciating the work, he was honored by Governor Anandiben Patel at Raj Bhavan.

== Achievement ==
Foodman Vishal Singh was honoured with the Ayush Seva Medal and a citation for his service effort by IAS Rajkamal Yadav, Director, Department of AYUSH.

Judge V. C. Gupta honored Singh with a Seva Medal.

Appreciating the work of the organization by the District Magistrate, Singh was awarded the Manav Mitra Medal.

Uttar Pradesh Law Minister Brijesh Pathak awarded the Atal Seva Medal to Singh for serving more than 7.5 lakh needy people in COVID-19 pandemic.

Lucknow Joint Director Sanjay Singh appreciated Singh for serving more than 7.5 lakh needy people in the COVID-19 epidemic and honoured him with COVID-19 Utkrisht Manav Seva Medal.
