= Antarala =

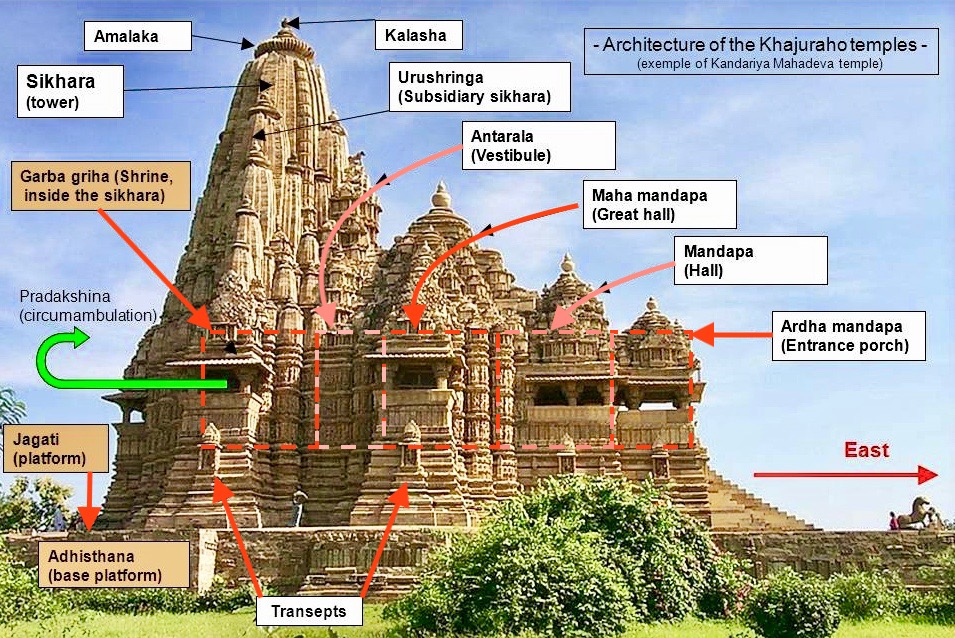
Architecture of Khajuraho temples with the antarala between the shikhara and the mandapas

Antarala (Sanskrit: अन्तराल; lit. 'intermediate space') is a small antechamber or foyer between the garbhagriha (shrine) and the mandapa, more typical of north Indian temples.

Antarala are commonly seen in Chalukyan Style temples, in which the vimana and the mandapa are connected through the antarala.
