= Suparṇākhyāna =

Ancient Sanskrit epic poem

Shout, thunder, reach the clouds; these waters of thine shall be level with the mountain-tops... Undefined, wholly water, the shore shall be: the frog-female shall croak all the night. (The winds) shall milk the cloud (cow) whose trail drips with milk, the wild beast shall come seeking firm land.

— Suparṇākhyāna, ix.3 (conjuring of a storm)

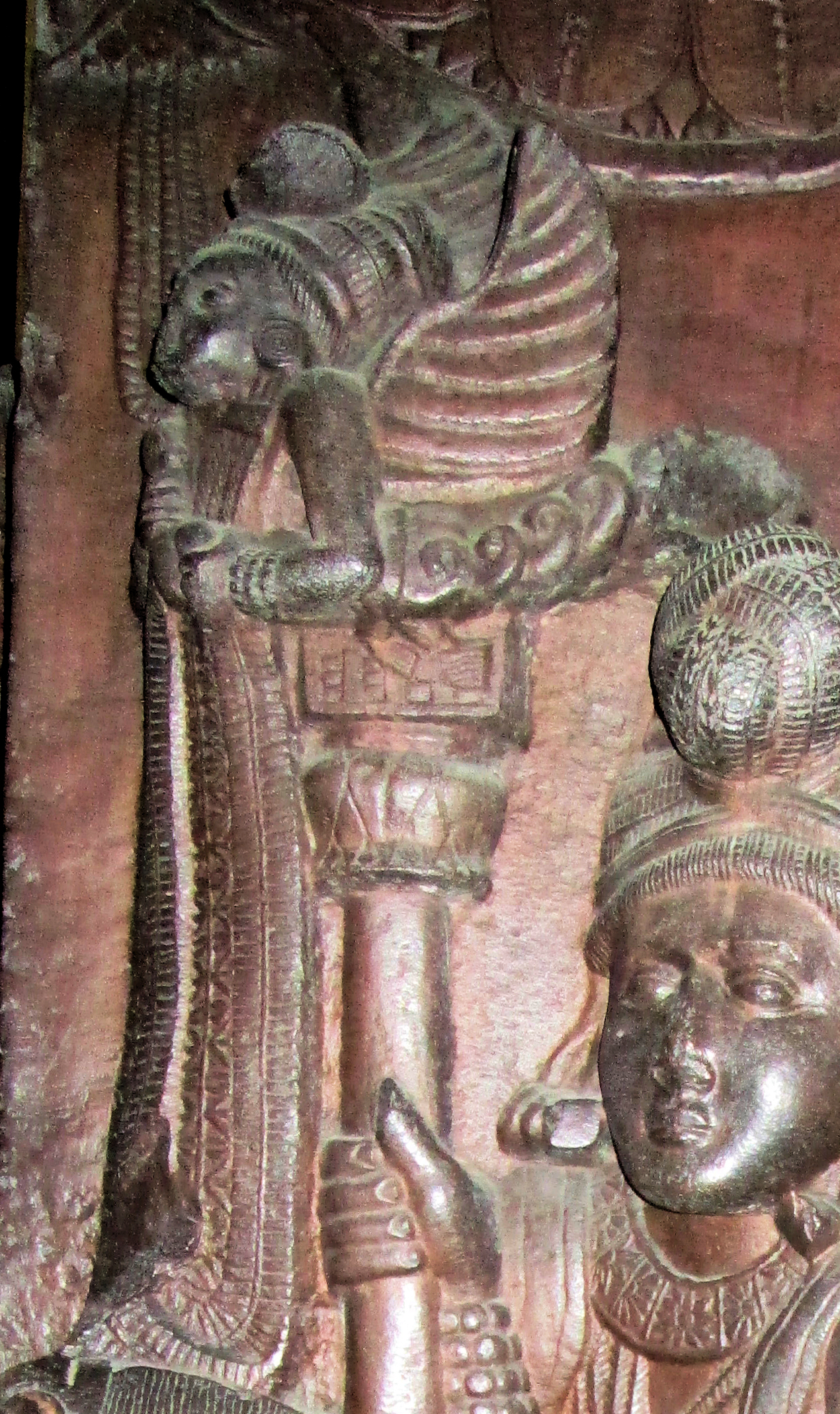
Relief depicting a portable Garuda pillar, one of the oldest images of Garuda, Bharhut, 100 BCE.

The Suparṇākhyāna, also known as the Suparṇādhyāya (meaning "Chapter of the Bird"), is a short epic poem or cycle of ballads in Sanskrit about the divine bird Garuda, believed to date from the late Vedic period. Considered to be among the "earliest traces of epic poetry in India," the text only survives "in very bad condition," and remains "little studied."

The subject of the poem is "the legend of Kadrū, the snake-mother, and Vinatā, the bird-mother, and enmity between Garuda and the snakes." It relates the birth of Garuda and his elder brother Aruṇa; Kadru and Vinata's wager about the color of the tail of the divine white horse Uchchaihshravas; Garuda's efforts to obtain freedom for himself and his mother; and his theft of the divine soma from Indra, whose thunderbolt is unable to stop Garuda, but merely causes him to drop a feather. It was the basis for the later, expanded version of the story, which appears in the Āstīka Parva, within the Ādi Parva of the Mahābhārata.

The Suparṇākhyāna's date of composition is uncertain; its unnamed author attempted to imitate the style of the Rigveda, but scholars agree that it is a significantly later composition, possibly from the time of the early Upanishads. On metrical grounds, it has been placed closest to the Katha Upanishad. A date of c. 500 BCE has been proposed, but is unproven, and is not agreed upon by all scholars.

== See also ==
- Indian epic poetry
- Vedic mythology
- Nāga
