= Asikni (goddess) =

Consort of Daksha in Hinduism

- Other names: Panchajani, Virani, Virini
- Devanagari: असिक्नी
- Gender: Female

Genealogy
- Parents: Virana or Panchajana (father)
- Consort: Daksha
- Children: Haryashvas and Shabalashvas; 60 daughters including Aditi, Diti, Kadru, Vinata, Rohini, Sati, and Revati

In Hindu mythology, Asikni (Sanskrit: असिक्नी, romanized: Asiknī, lit. 'the dark one' or 'night'), also known as Panchajani and Virani, is a consort of Daksha in the Puranic pantheon. Most scriptures mention her as the mother of 6000 sons and 60 daughters.

== Etymology and epithets ==
The Sanskrit word "Asikni" means 'dark' or 'night'; it can also refer to "a girl attending woman's apartment". The word is used in the Rigveda (c. 1500 BCE) to describe the Chenab River. (Note: Mentioned in RV 7.20.25 and 10.75.5. Medieval literature notes it to be a river of pilgrimage.)

She is also known by the patronymic "Panchajani" and "Virani".

== Legend ==
=== Birth ===
Puranas differ about her parentage.

Devi-Bhagavata Purana, Kalika Purana, Garuda Purana, and Brahma Purana note Asikni to have been born of Brahma's left thumb. According to the Bhagavata Purana and Shiva Purana, she was the daughter of Prajapati Panchajana.

Brahma Purana, Brahmanda Purana, Vayu Purana, Kalika Purana, Kurma Purana, Padma Purana, Garuda Purana, and Shiva Purana note her to be the daughter of Prajapati Virana.

=== Marriage ===
The broad theme is common to Vayu Purana, Bhagavata Purana, and Brahma Purana. (Note: Other Puranas typically skip the detailed narrative of Vishnu's boon.)

Daksa was delegated by Brahma to create beings to populate the cosmos; he went on to create gods, sages, asuras, yaskhas and rakhashas from his mind, but failed to be further successful. (Note: Brahma Purana notes Daksa to have also created Gandharvas from his mind.) (Note: Brahmanda Purana and Vayu Purana gives a longer list of creations inc. plants, human beings, ghosts, serpents, deer, flesh-eating demons, and birds. Va. P. also mentions that Mahadeva had rebuked him, after the mind-created species failed to propagate.) Upon a successful penance, Vishnu granted Asikni as his wife and urged him to engage in sexual union. (Note: Asikni is noted to be supporting the entire world in Vayu Purana.)

=== Children ===
Through their union, numerous children were born. A common theme spans across the Brahmanda Purana, Bhagavata Purana, Linga Purana (Note: Does not mention her as Asikni. Suti and Virini are used instead.), Garuda Purana, Kurma Purana, Shiva Purana, Vishnu Purana, Vayu Purana, Padma Purana (Note: Does not mention her as Asikni. Uses Virini and note her to be Daksa's "maid-servant"!), and Brahma Purana in this regard.

Daksha and Asikni initially produced five thousand sons, who were known as Haryashvas. They were interested in populating the Earth but upon the advice of Narada, took to discovering worldly affairs instead and never returned back. (Note: Both Bh. P and Sh. P. note Brahma to have consoled a grievous Daksa after this loss.) Daksha and Asikni again produced another thousand sons (Shabalashvas), who had similar intentions but were persuaded by Narada to the same results. (Note: Bhagavat Purana and Shiva Purana note the sons to have already started a penance at the confluence of the Sindhu (to fulfill their duty) both the times, before being led astray by Narada. Bh. P. also describes the sayings of Narada in detail. Kurma Purana skips the case of Sabalasvas.) An angry Daksha cursed Narada to be a perpetual wanderer. This time, he birthed sixty daughters from Asikni. (Note: In Vayu Purana, Narada is cursed with the perennial pain of staying in a womb. In Kurma Purana, he is cursed to be issue-less.) They were married off to different sages and deities, and went on to give birth to various species. (Note: Marriage list is as follows: 10 (Arundhati, Vasu, Yami, Lamba, Bhanu, Maruvati, Sankalpa, Muhurta, Sadhya, Vishva) of those daughters were married to Dharma; 13 (Aditi, Diti, Danu, Arishta, Surasa, Khasa, Surabhi, Vinata, Tamra, Krodhavasha, Ira, Kadru, Muni) to sage Kashyapa; 27 (Ashvini, Bharani, Krttika, Rohini, Mrigashira, Tarakam or Ardra, Punarvasu, Pushya, Ashlesha, Janakam or Magha, Phalguni, Uttarphalguni, Hasta, Chitra, Svati, Vishakha, Anuradha, Jyestha, Mula, Purvashadha, Uttarasadha, Srona or Shravana, Dhanistha or Shatabhisha, Abhijit or Prachetas, Purvabhadrapada, Uttarabhadrapada and Revati) to Chandra; 4 to Arishtanemi; 2 to Bahuputra; 2 to sage Angiras; 2 to Krisasva) (Note: Vishnu Purana notes these sixty daughters to have been created from His mind. Agni Purana notes the same. Further, there is no mention of Asikni or their 6000 sons.)

The Shiva Purana notes that thereafter Shiva had himself reincarnated within Asikni's womb; Asikni was widely respected and eulogized by all the deities during this span. (Note: This was the result of a boon granted by Shiva to Daksa, much prior to his marriage, as the result of a long penance.) In the tenth month, Asikni gave birth to Sati; she and Daksa went on to take good care of her. (Note: "Sati", true to the boon (see prev. note), desired for Shiva since an early age and went on to marry Him. Also, see Daksha Yajna myth.)
