= Airavata =

Mythical creature in Hinduism

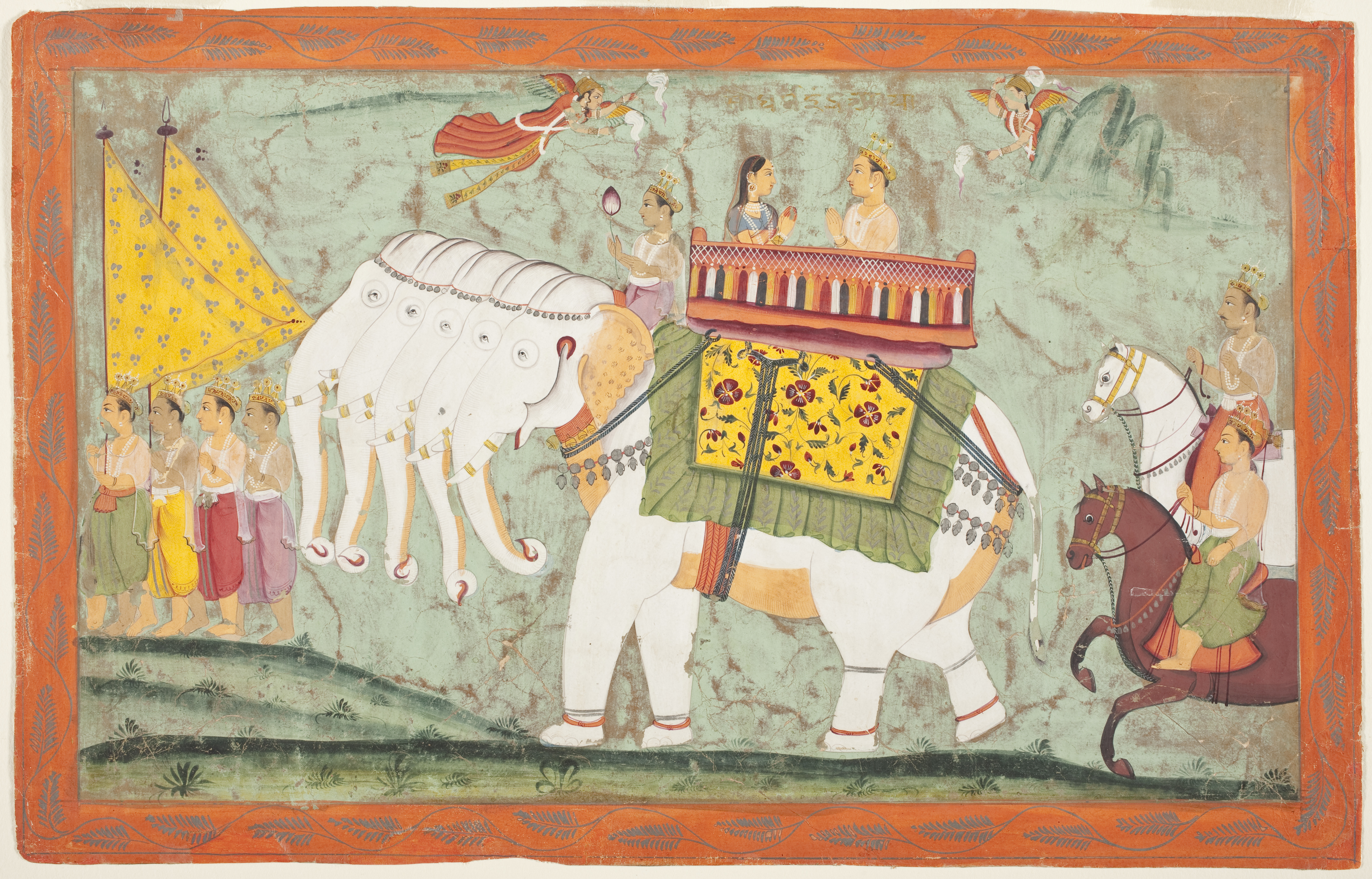
Indra (alias Sakra) and Shachi riding the five-headed Divine Elephant Airavata, Folio from a Jain text, Panch Kalyanaka (Five Auspicious Events in the Life of Jina Rishabhanatha), c. 1670–1680, Painting in LACMA museum, originally from Amber, Rajasthan

Airavata (Sanskrit: ऐरावत, romanized: airāvata, lit. 'belonging to Iravati', Pāḷi Erāvana, Sinhala: Airāvana) is a divine elephant. According to sacred Hindu texts, Airavata was born with three heads, six tusks and three trunks. He is pristine white. Some Puranas say Airavata was born with ten tusks, five trunks, and 10 teeth, representing 10 directions. He is the "king of elephants" and serves as the main vehicle for the deity Indra. He is also called 'Abhra-matanga', meaning "elephant of the clouds"; 'Naga-malla', meaning "the fighting elephant"; and 'Arkasodara', meaning "brother of the sun". 'Abhramu' is the elephant wife of Airavata. Airavata is also the third son of Iravati. In the Mahabharata he is listed as a great serpent.

== Hindu tradition ==
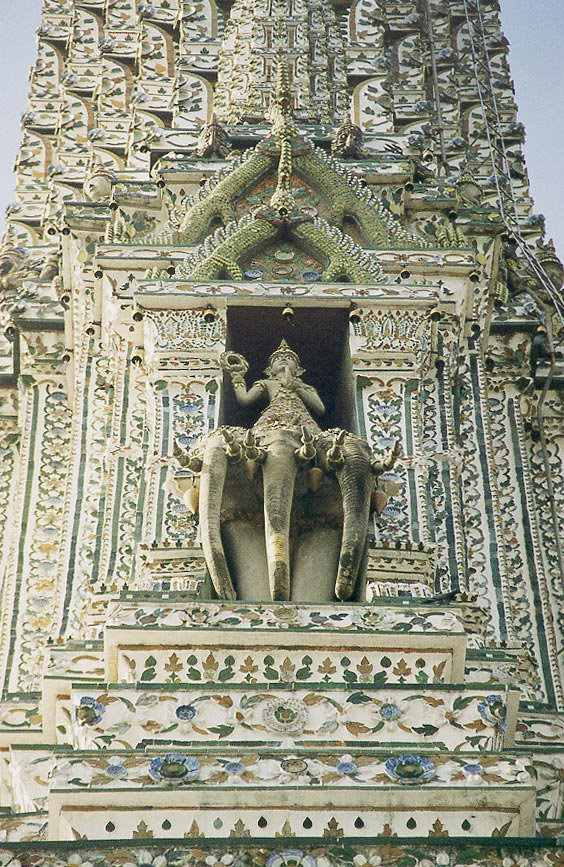
Detail of the Phra Prang, the central tower of the Wat Arun ("Temple of Dawn") in Bangkok, Thailand, showing Indra on his three-headed elephant Erawan (Airavata)

The appearance or birth of Airavata varies according to different Hindu texts. In the Ramayana, Airavata was born to Iravati (descendant of the sage, Kashyapa), whereas the Vishnu Purana notes that Airavata was born from the churning of the ocean of milk.

According to the Matangalila, Airavata was born when Brahma sang sacred hymns over the halves of the egg shell from which Garuda hatched. Airavata emerged from the right shell, followed by seven more males, while eight female elephants emerged from the left. The eight pairs served as the progenitors of all earthly and heavenly elephants, and as the Diggajas, supporting the universe in the eight directions. The descendants of these original sixteen elephants possessed wings and could change their form at will. The species lost this power after being cursed by an ascetic sage Dirghatapas, when several of his disciples were killed. A group of winged elephants had settled on a branch of a Himalayan tree directly above Dirghatapas and his disciples, and the branch broke. Dirghatapas's curse meant they lost both their wings and their ability to shapeshift, forcing them to live on the earth in service to humans.

Prithu made Airavata king of all elephants. The name of his consort, Abhramu, means "the one who knits or binds the clouds," reflecting the idea that elephants can produce rain clouds. The connection of elephants with water and rain is emphasized in the mythology of Indra, who rides the elephant Airavata when he defeats Vritra.

It is believed that the elephant guards one of the points of compass. Airavata also stands at the entrance to Svarga, Indra's palace. In addition, the eight guardian deities who preside over the points of the compass each sit on an elephant (world elephant). Each of these deities has an elephant that takes part in the defense and protection of its respective quarter. Chief among them is Airavata of Indra. There is a reference to Airavata in the Bhagavad Gita:

Of horses, know Me to be the nectar-born Uchchaihshravas; of lordly elephants, Airavata and of men, the monarch.

Airavata is also known for re-emerging during the churning of the ocean of milk. Once, sage Durvasa presented a garland to Indra, who passed it on to Airavata. The elephant threw the garland on to the ground, which angered Durvasa, who cursed the demigods to be "subject to old age and death." Durvasa's curse also destroyed Airavata. When Indra subsequently churned the ocean to recover his lost power, Airavata emerged from the waters alongside his consort Abhramu.

At Darasuram near Tanjore is a temple where it is believed that Airavata worshipped the Lingam; the Lingam is named after him as Airavateshwara. This temple, which abounds in rare sculpture and architectural workmanship, was built by Rajaraja Chola II (1146–73 CE).

== Jain tradition ==
In Jain tradition, when a Tirthankara is born, Indra descends with his consort, Shachi, riding their mount, the great elephant Airavata, to celebrate the event.

== Flags with Airavata ==
Laos

Flag of French Laos (1893–1952)

Flag of the Royal Lao Government in Exile (1952–1975, 2003-current)

Laotian royal standard (1952–1975)

Siam (Thailand)

"Thong Airaphot" (ธงไอยราพต) King's Absent Standard (1855–1891 & 1897–1910)

"Thong Chuthathipathai" (ธงจุฑาธิปไตย) King's Absent Standard (1891–1897)

Flag of the Bangkok Metropolitan Administration

== In Southeast Asia ==
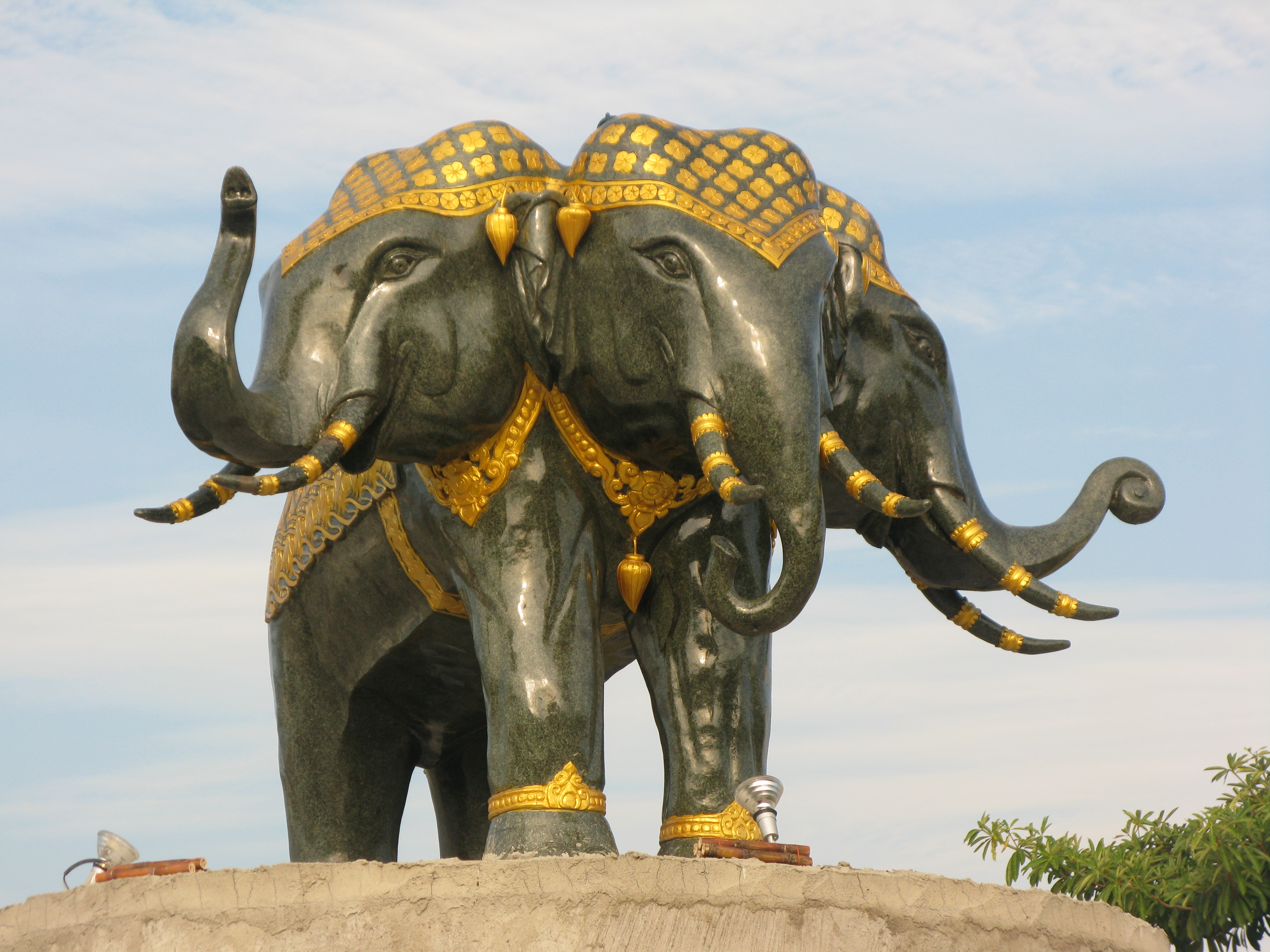
Erawan statue in Chiang Mai, Thailand.

Erawan (Thai: เอราวัณ, from Pāḷi Erāvana, or Sanskrit Airāvana) is one of the Thai names of Airavata. It is depicted as a huge elephant with either three or sometimes thirty-three heads which are often shown with more than two tusks. Some statues show Indra, the king of Tavatimsa Heaven, riding on Erawan.

Modern Art Depiction Of Airavata

The elephant became the symbol of Bangkok by association with Indra during its foundation as the capital of the new Rattanakosin Kingdom . It is also sometimes associated with the old Lao Kingdom of Lan Xang and the defunct Kingdom of Laos, where it was more commonly known as the "three-headed elephant" and had been used on the royal flag.

== In popular culture ==
Airavata is a recruitable character in the Megami Tensei video game series.

Airavata is referenced in the song "The Animal Tent" on the album The Circus by The Venetia Fair:

Here comes Airavata; the elephant controls the rainclouds, His skin the rumbling earth (Airavata!)

Airavata is the name of the Volvo bus service that Karnataka State Road Transport Corporation provides.

== See also ==
- Erawan Shrine
- Erawan Museum

== General references ==
- Goswamy, B. N. (2014), The Spirit of Indian Painting: Close Encounters with 100 Great Works 1100–1900, Penguin Books, ISBN 978-0-670-08657-3
