= Shyena (Hinduism) =

Divine hawk-like creature mentioned in Hindu Mythology

Shyena (Sanskrit: श्येन, romanized: Śyena) is a divine falcon in Hindu mythology identified with the fire god Agni, who ascends to heaven for bringing soma (nectar) to earth with the intention of rejuvenating and revitalizing of all things that exist on earth. It also refers to the fire-altar constructed with bricks (Agni Chayana) in the shape of a falcon (symbolizing the essence of Agni) in the Vedic ritual. The Yajurveda prescribes prayers and mantras meant to be recited during the course of the construction of this fire-altar which represents the creator and the created. In the Puranas, Shyena becomes Garuda, the vehicle of Vishnu, which finds mention also in the Adi Parva of the Mahabharata, and who brought amrita from heaven at the behest of Kadru, the mother of serpents and a co-wife of the rishi (sage) Kashyapa.

== Literature ==
Shyena and Suparna, both, refer to the eagle and the falcon, two of the swiftest birds (of prey). In the Rigveda mantra (I.164.20) - द्वा सुपर्णा सयुजा सखाया समानं वृक्षं परि षस्वजाते – there is in fact a reference to these two types of suparnas which are identified as the golden oriole, having beautiful wings, and the eagle. In a mantra addressed to the Vedic god Indra,

प्र सु ष विभ्यो मरुतो विरस्तु प्र श्येनः श्येनेभ्य आशुपत्वा |
अचक्रया यत्स्वधया सुपर्णो हव्यं भरन्मनवे देवजुष्टम् ||

" Before all birds be ranked this bird, O Maruts; supreme of falcons, be this fleet-winged Shyena, because, strong-pinioned, with no chariot to bear him, he brought to Manu the god-loved oblation (Soma)." – (Rigveda IV.26.4)

Rishi Vamadeva refers to Shyena as the suparna which brings soma, the favorite oblation of the gods. In the Rigveda, this term is also used to denote a horse.

Shyena, along with Ketu Agneya and Vatsa, is one of the sons of Agni, who are all rishis.

Shyena denotes the Atman, to it belongs the power of realizing the Sole Reality.

Shyena is referred to as a malevolent sacrifice (yajna) conducted with the intention of causing harm to others.

At the commencement of the Kurukshetra War which lasted for eighteen days, the Pandavas, being aware that Bhishma stood protected by the "makara vyuha" and was ready for battle, they had adopted the invincible "shyena vyuha" with Bhima leading stationed at the mouth and Arjuna stationed at the neck of the bird-shaped vyuha, and Yudhishthira patrolling the rear.
