= Danu (Hinduism) =

Hindu deity

- Texts: Vedas, Puranas

Genealogy
- Parents: Daksha (father), Panchajani (mother)
- Siblings: Aditi, Diti, Svaha, Khyati, Sati, Kadru, Vinata, Rohini, Revati, and Rati
- Spouse: Kashyapa
- Children: Danavas

Equivalents
- Indo-European: Deh₂nu

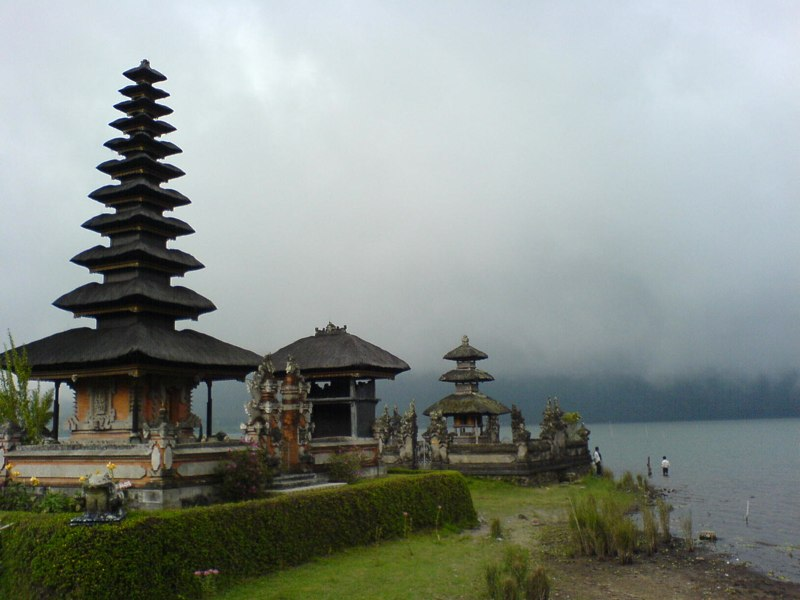
The Hindu temple (pura) Ulun Danu Bratan by the crater lake Tamblingan in Bali, Indonesia

Danu (Sanskrit: दनु, IAST: Danu) is a Hindu primordial goddess. She is mentioned in the Rigveda to be the mother of the eponymous race known as the danavas. The word Danu described the primeval waters that this deity perhaps embodied. In later Hinduism, she is described as the daughter of the Prajapati Daksha and his spouse Panchajani (Asikni), and the consort of the sage Kashyapa.

== Etymology ==
As a word for "rain" or "liquid", danu is compared to Avestan dānu, "river", and further to river names like Don, Danube, Dnieper, Dniestr, etc. There is also a Danu river in Nepal. The "liquid" word is mostly neutral, but appears as feminine in RV 1.54.

== Literature ==
=== Rigveda ===
In the Rigveda (I.32.9), she is identified as the mother of Vritra, the asura slain by Indra.

=== Padma Purana ===
In the Padma Purana, the children of Danu are described:

From Kaśyapa, Danu obtained a hundred sons proud of boons. Among them Vipracitti, of great power, was the chief. (Others were) Dviraṣṭamūrdhā, Śakuni, Śaṅkuśirodhara, Ayomukha, Śambara, Kapila, Vāmana, Marīci, Māgadha, and Hari. Gajaśiras, Nidrādhara, Ketu, Ketuvīrya Taśakratu, Indramitragraha, Vrajanābha, Ekavastra, Mahābāhu, Vajrākṣa, Tāraka, Asiloman, Puloman, Vikurvāṇa, Mahāpura, Svarbhānu, and Vṛṣaparvan—these and others were also Danu's sons. Suprabhā was Svarbhānu's daughter, and Śacī was the daughter of Puloman.

— Padma Purana, Book 1, Chapter 6

=== Brahmanda Purana ===
In the Brahmanda Purana, it is stated that while Aditi is habitually righteous, and Diti was habitually strong, Danu habitually practices maya.

Danu was struck by Indra's thunderbolt after hearing him kill her son Vritra.

== See also ==
- Danu (Irish goddess)
- Dewi Danu, a Balinese Hindu goddess
- Tiamat
