= Bhogavati =

Capital of the nagas in Indian religions

Bhogavati (Sanskrit: भोगवती, romanized: Bhogavatī) is the subterranean capital of the nagas in Hindu mythology and Buddhist mythology. It is located in the Nagaloka region of Patala.

== Buddhism ==
Bhogavati appears in Buddhist tradition as a palace in the naga world. It is the residence of the naga King Varuṇa.

A somewhat detailed description of the palace is given in the Vidhurapaṇḍita Jātaka.

== Hinduism ==
The Mahabharata offers a description of Bhogavati. The nagas that populate this city are the size of mountains, and are stated to be the offspring of Kashyapa and Surasa. They are described to possess multiple heads and take on a variety of forms, and wear ornamentation that feature gemstones, svastikas, circles, as well as drinking vessels. They are stated to be ferocious and of great prowess. Vasuki is described to be its ruler.

The Ramayana states that Bhogavati is captured by the rakshasa king Ravana during his reign.

== Sources ==
- A Classical Dictionary of Hindu Mythology & Religion by John Dowson
- Indian Serpent Lore or The Nagas in Hindu Legend and Rt by J. Vogel.
