= Danava (Hinduism) =

Race in Hindu mythology

Danavas
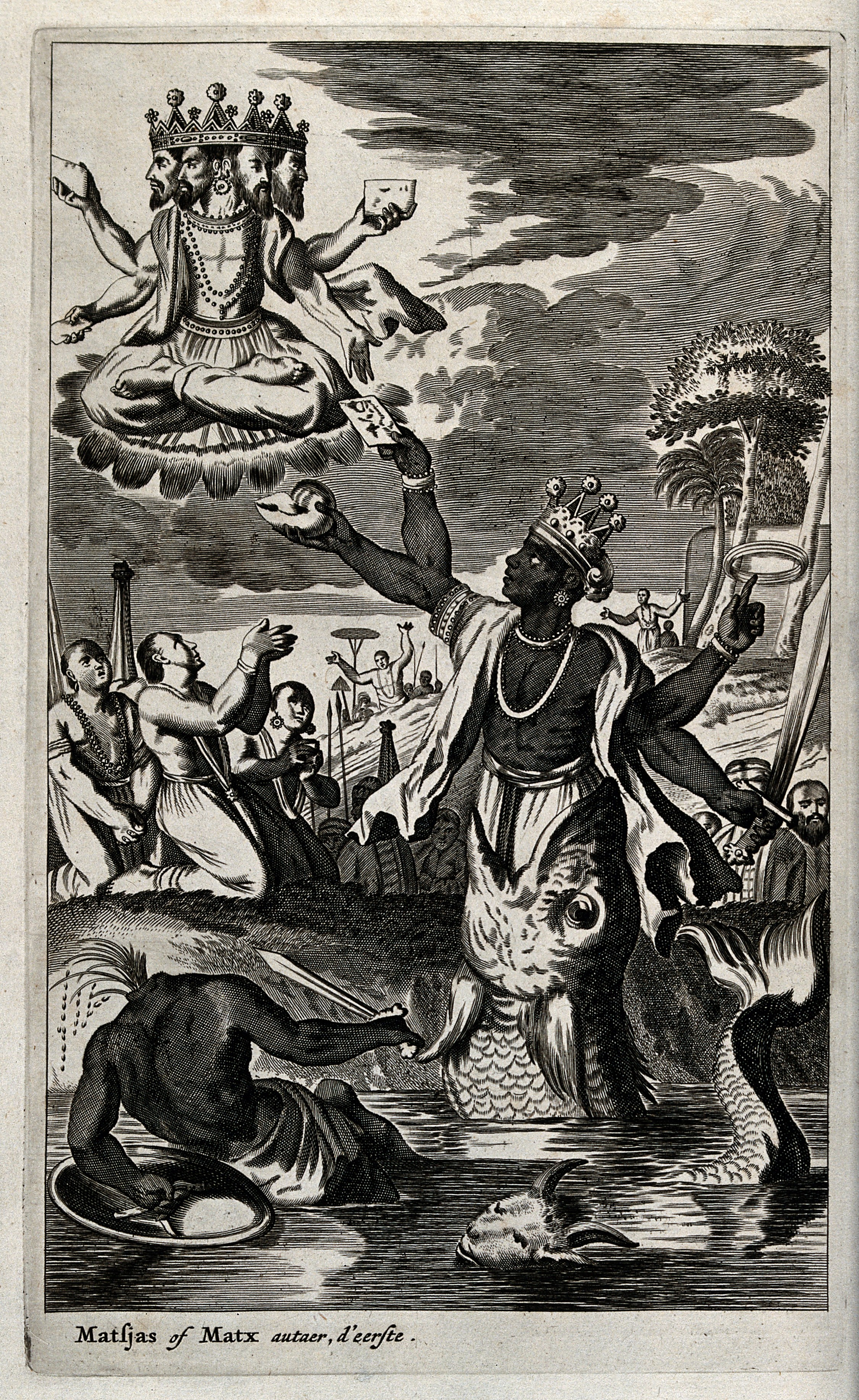
- Matsya slays a danava called Hayagriva.
- Devanagari: दानव
- Texts: Mahabharata, Rig Veda, Natyashastra
- Parents: Danu and Kashyapa

In Hindu mythology, the danavas are a race descending from Kashyapa and his wife Danu, a daughter of the progenitor god, Daksha. It is mentioned that there are one hundred danavas.

== Origin ==
The danavas are a legendary race of asuras, the half-brothers to the devas and daityas that are found in a range of Hindu texts. The danavas are a part of a larger group of the asuras, and are typically portrayed as opposed to the Hindu deities. However, historically, their role in Hinduism is varied and at times, the distinction between the danavas and Hindu deities is complex and they are difficult to distinguish from one another.

=== Etymology ===
The name danavas stems from the mother's name: Danu. Both danavas and Danu are derived from the Vedic word Da meaning 'to give'. Ananda Coomaraswamy suggests this word connotes generosity. Another interpretation of their name is associated with Danu's relationship with her first son (and demon), Vritra. In Hindu belief, in an attempt to deceive the Vedic god Indra, Vritra hides away in the primordial water or blessed water from him. In this account, Danu herself is embodied as being the primordial water in which he hides. The names of Danu and the danavas as well as the individual names given to many of the sons of Danu differ across Vedic and Puranic literature, causing confusion as to where their etymological origins lie.

=== Story ===
The devas exiled the danavas from Svarga during the Satya Yuga. After the exile, the danavas are held to have taken refuge in the Vindhya range.

=== Genealogy ===
The genealogical history of asuras is laid out in a range of texts, most notably in the Mahabharata. The genealogy of the demons or asuras begins with Brahma's six sons. One son, Marichi, fathered Kashyapa, who married thirteen of Daksha's daughters, including Diti and Danu. Diti and Danu's children are among the best-known demons in Hindu belief. Diti's children are called the daityas and Danu's offspring are known as the danavas.

The names of danavas and the daityas are irregularly found and depicted throughout early Vedic literature such as the Rig Veda along with the Mahabharata. Brill's Encyclopedia of Hinduism states, "... in the Mahābhārata Vṛtra is the son of Danāyu, (and) the Ṛigveda (1.32.9) speaks of Vṛtra as the son of Danu." However, in books 2–7 of the Rig Veda, Vrta is not considered an asura or demon, and there is no mention of Danu or the danavas at all.

- Brahma
  - Marici
    - Kashyapa
      - Danu
        - Ashva
        - Ashvagiri
        - Ashvagriva
        - Ashvapati
        - Ashvasanku
        - Ashvasiras
        - Ayumukha
        - Danayu
        - Dirghajibha
        - Ekacakra
        - Ekaksha
        - Gaganamurdhana
        - Gavisthar
        - Hara
        - Hayagriva
        - Isrpa
        - Kabandha
        - Kapata (or Vegavat)
        - Kabila
        - Karambha
        - Kesin
        - Ketumat
        - Kupatha
        - Maydanav
        - Mrtapa
        - Naraka
        - Nichandra
        - Nikumbha
        - Pralambha
        - Puloman
        - Rambha
        - Salabha
        - Sankara
        - Sankusiras
        - Sarabha
        - Satha
        - Satrutpana
        - Swarbhanu
        - Tuhundra
        - Viprachitti
        - Vritra

At other times, the genealogical roots of the demons are not emphasised. Demons are sometimes depicted as ancestral, deceased beings who had been mistreated in their human lifetime by relatives who had not performed the proper and correct funeral rites for these beings in their human form.

== Physical appearance ==
The daityas and the danavas share the same physical features and characteristics as their counterparts, the devas. In Hindu religion, the power of Maya or the power of magic (sometimes attributed to illusion) is possessed by both good and evil supernatural beings. The power of illusion allows beings to change their physical form. Despite their extensive role in certain texts, there are not many examples of the physical characteristics of the danavas in their own right or even in conjunction with devas in literature and art.

== Literature ==
The extensive research into the supernatural beings of Hinduism focuses on their ambiguity. Both good and bad supernatural beings demonstrate malevolent, powerful, yet merciful personalities. Therefore, at times, it is difficult to discern between the roles of oppositional beings. This is particularly evident in earlier Vedic literature where there is not an emphasis on the oppositional qualities of these beings. In many myths or hymns, they perform identical actions to one another. Subsequently, the danavas's role is hardly distinguished or mentioned in Vedic literature. O'Flaherty and Doniger state that in later literature like the Mahabharata, these beings are slowly considered a part of "... two separate castes; each has his own job to do – the gods to encourage sacrifice, the demons to destroy it – but there is no immorality in the demons; they are merely doing their job, a destructive one ...". While, in the earlier Vedic period, themes of caste-based structures of worship were not prominent.

== Stories ==
=== Natyashastra ===
In the Natyashastra, the danavas are depicted as evil demons, meddling with dancers. Particularly, in the first chapter of the Natyashastra, the danavas freeze and stop the performance of the dancers during an important event dedicated to the Hindu deities. Angering the deities, the danavas are attacked and defeated by Indra and an enclosed, safe dance arena is created for the dancers. Afterwards, dance-dramas depicting the defeat of the danavas are performed at the arena and anger the demons further. The danavas protestations are reserved for Brahma, the god of creation. Brahma advises the danavas that dance drama allows participants and viewers to become divine or a part of the gods in unison. Therefore, some scholars interpret Brahma's reply as the important role dance plays in worship.

=== Indra–Vritra story ===
The Indra–Vritra story is the only known story that contains a prominent son of Danu, a member of the danavas. These accounts are what later cement the rivalry of the devas and asuras. The struggle between Indra and Vritra act as a "cosmogonic myth" as it discusses the birth of sat ('order') from asat ('chaos').

=== Mayasura ===
Mayasura, also called Maya Danava, is a prominent member of the danavas and is extensively found throughout the Mahabharata. He was a popular architect and rival to the architect to the gods, Vishvakarma. He is also known for being the father-in-law to Ravana, a prominent antagonist in Hindu belief. He wrote the Surya Siddhanta. However, he is most known for his architecture. In the Sabha Parva of the Mahabharata, Maya danava built the 'Mayasabha', or the palace of illusions for the Pandava brothers. Here, Mayasura asked Arjuna for guidance and advised he wished to build something of value for him and the Pandavas. After Arjuna and Vaisampayana discuss what should be built, Lord Krishna advises Maya to build a godlike palace. As translated by Ganguli, Krishna contemplates and announces what he desires. Maya is referred to being the son of Diti, despite being addressed as Maya danava during the entirety of Book 2.

Krishna, the Lord of the universe and the Creator of every object, having reflected in his mind, thus commanded Maya,—'Let a palatial sabha [meeting hall] as thou choosest, be built [by thee], if thou, O son of Diti, who art the foremost of all artists, desirest to do good to Yudhishthira the just. Indeed, build thou such a palace that persons belonging to the world of men may not be able to imitate it even after examining it with care, while seated within. And, O Maya, build thou a mansion in which we may behold a combination of godly, asuric and human designs.

Elsewhere, Mayasura built Tripura, also known as the three cities of gold, silver and iron. He also built the city of Lankapuri in Lanka.

== See also ==
- Asura
- Bhagavata Purana
- Daitya
- Danaïdes
- Danube River Danu-be
- Denyen
- Dewi Danu
- Kalakeyas
- Kukulkan
- List of Asuras
- Nāga
- Nivatakavacha
- Rakshasa
- Tribe of Dan
- Tuatha Dé Danann
