= Tārakāsura =

Asura in Hindu mythology

Tarakasura
- Affiliation: Asura
- Texts: Skanda Purana, Shiva Purana, Kumarasambhava

Genealogy
- Parents: Vajranga (father); Vajrangi (mother); Diti (grandmother); Kashyapa (grandfather)
- Spouse: Shambuki
- Children: Tripurasura

Tarakasura (Sanskrit: तारकासुर) is a powerful asura in Hindu mythology. He is the son of the asura Vajranga and his wife Vajrangi. Taraka had three sons: Tarakaksha, Vidyunmali, and Kamalaksha, who were known as the Tripurasura. He is slain by Kartikeya.

== Legend ==
=== Birth ===
Diti, ever jealous of her sister Aditi, asked for her consort Kashyapa to provide her a son who would be capable of defeating the devas, who were the sons of Aditi. Consenting, Kashyapa granted his son Vajranga, possessing vajra(a very hard substance or compound in hindu history) limbs, who performed her bidding by capturing Indra and the devas and punishing them. When Aditi protested, Brahma urged Vajranga to release his captives, who acquiesced, stating that he had only done what his mother had instructed. Pleased, Brahma created a wife for him known as Vajrangi, who was both alluring and loving. When he offered her a boon, she asked him to grant her a son who would capture the three worlds, and cause misery to Vishnu. Dumbstruck, he performed a penance to Brahma to grant him a good son, who was born as Tarakasura.

=== Boon ===
Taraka performed penance to Brahma and, when the creator appeared, asked for two boons: One, that none shall be his equal in all of the three worlds, and two, that only a son of Shiva could slay him. This second desire was considered to be crafty on his part, since Shiva was a yogi and was unlikely to bear children. His wish granted, Tarakasura promptly overran Svarga, expelling the devas just like his father had, but now declaring himself to be the new Indra. Indra approached Brahma and demanded that he assist him, since it was the latter's fault for granting whatever boons his devotees sought. Brahma explained to him that he could not do much, considering that Shiva was engaged in a deep tapas and would hardly notice Parvati, the daughter of Himavan who sought him as her husband. Indra devised a scheme with Kamadeva and Rati, who attempted to disrupt Shiva and beguile him with thoughts of love, accompanied by dancing apsaras and music. When Kamadeva shot his floral arrow at Shiva, he felt a powerful surge of attraction towards Parvati, but then observed the scheming Kamadeva and burnt him to ash. Parvati performed severe tapas in order to finally win the affection of Shiva and married him with great pomp, giving birth to Kartikeya, the son of Shiva destined to slay Taraka.

=== Battle against Skanda ===
According to the Skanda Purana, Kartikeya (Skanda) was appointed as the commander of the gods, charged with his destiny of vanquishing the asura. The divinities offered a number of gifts to empower him. Taraka, the king of the daityas, summoned billions of asuras to defend his realm, his forces commanded by Kalanemi. The asuras gained the upper hand, the armies of the devas falling like trees to a forest fire. Indra was struck down. Hearing Kalanemi's contempt, Kartikeya and Vishnu arrived to duel him, the latter wielding his great bow and raining arrows on the asura from atop Garuda. Kalanemi responded by swallowing Vishnu and Garuda whole, after which the deity sliced the asura's belly open with the Sudarshana Chakra, the celestial weapon cutting down masses of daitya warriors. Observing Taraka, Vishnu spoke to Kartikeya:

O Kumara, see the Lord of Daityas, who is like Kala (God of Death) at the close of a Yuga. This is that same (demon) by whom Śiva had been propitiated by means of terrible penance. It is he by whom Śakra and others had been transformed into monkeys for one hundred million years. It is he who could not be defeated by us despite our pile of all (superior) weapons in the course of the battle. This great Asura should not be viewed with contemptuous disregard. He is Taraka. This is your seventh day. Now it is mid-day. Slay him before sunset. Otherwise he cannot be killed.

— Skanda Purana, Kaumarika Kanda, Chapter 30, Verses 58 - 61

Kartikeya ignored Taraka's words of condescension and battled him, hurling his terrible shakti on the asuras. When the miraculous missile was thrown by Skanda of unmeasured splendour, excessively terrible clusters of meteors fell on the earth. A million missiles of shakti fell out from it, a thousand million vehicles being struck down. When Vishnu urged him to hurl his shakti against Taraka, Skanda hesitated, observing that his foe was a devotee of Rudra. Vishnu then manipulated Taraka into attacking Shiva.

Thereupon various Devas rushed (against the Daitya) in the following manner: Janardana lifted up his discus and rushed speedily. Indra lifted up his thunderbolt. Yama raised his staff roaring loudly. The infuriated Dhaneśvara roared raising his iron club. Varuṇa roared with his noose held aloft. Vayu raised his terrible great goad. The Fire-god (Vahni) lifted up his Śakti of great refulgence. Nirṛti raised his sharp sword. The infuriated Rudras lifted up their tridents. Sadhya-devas raised their bows. Vasus lifted up iron bolts. Viśvedevas raised pestles and thrashing rods. The Moon and the Sun their refulgence, the Aśvinīdevas the medicinal herbs, the serpents the blazing poison and Himadri and other important ones lifted up the mountains.

— Skanda Purana, Kamumarika Kanda, Chapter 30, Verses 111 - 115

Nevertheless, Taraka proved to be equal to all of their prowess combined, roaring triumphantly. During the war, Lord Vishnu led the vanguard of the Deva army, decimating the Asura forces. A fierce confrontation took place between Vishnu and Tarakasura. While they fought with unabated strength, Vishnu chose to step back from the duel after Lord Brahma reminded the deities that Tarakasura was bound by a cosmic boon granting him immunity from everyone except a son of Shiva. Vishnu gracefully yielded the battlefield, allowing the young Skanda to fulfill his destiny. The conflict culminated in a direct duel between the two commanders. Skanda ultimately slew Tarakasura by piercing his chest with his divine spear, the Vel (also referred to as the Shakti weapon), destroying the demon and restoring cosmic order.

== Literary references ==
This story is the basis for the epic Kumarasambhava (lit., birth of Kartikeya) by Kalidasa (c. 4th century CE). The theme of the vaporised love spirit roaming free in the universe was adopted by the Vaishnavas (c. 16th century) who believe it was reincarnated in Vasudeva. This is also the theme of the poem madanbhasmer par (মদনভস্মের পর) by Rabindranath Tagore.

== See also ==
- Kartikeya
