= Uchchaihshravas =

Divine horse in Hinduism

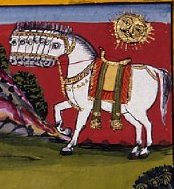
- A painting depicting seven-headed Uchchaihshravas
- Abode: Svarga
- Texts: Mahabharata; Ramayana

In Hinduism, Uchchaihshravas (Sanskrit: उच्चैःश्रवस्, IAST: Uccaiḥśravas or Sanskrit: उच्चैःश्रवा:, IAST: Uccaiḥśravāḥ), (lit. 'long-ears' or 'neighing aloud') is a seven-headed flying horse, created during the churning of the ocean. It is considered the best of horses, as prototype and king of the horses. Uchchaihshravas is often described as a vahana of Indra, but is also recorded to be the horse of Bali, the king of the asuras. Uchchaihshravas is said to be snowy white in colour.

== Literature ==
=== Mahabharata ===
The Mahabharata mentions that Uchchaihshravas rose from the Samudra Manthana ("churning of the milk ocean") and Indra—the god-king of heaven—seized it and made it his vehicle (vahana). The stallion rose from the ocean along with other treasures like goddess Lakshmi - the goddess of fortune, who chose Vishnu as her consort, and the amrita - the elixir of life. The legend of Uchchaihshravas, rising from the milk ocean, also appears in the Vishnu Purana, the Ramayana, the Matsya Purana, the Vayu Purana etc. While various sources list different treasures (ratnas) that emerged from the churning of the ocean of milk, most of them concur that Uchchaihshravas was one of them.

The Mahabharata also mentions a bet between sisters and wives of Kashyapa - Vinata and Kadru about the colour of Uchchaihshravas's tail. While Vinata—the mother of Garuda and Aruna—said it was white, Kadru said it was black. The loser would have to become a servant of the winner. Kadru told her Naga ("serpent") sons to cover the tail of the horse and thus make it appear as black in colour and thus, Kadru won.

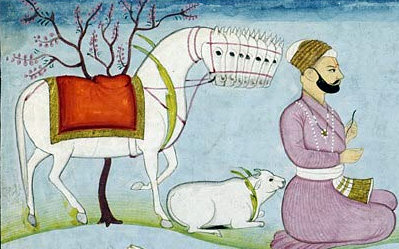
A seven-headed winged Uchchaihshravas with other treasures from Samudra manthan.

Uchchaihshravas is also mentioned in the Bhagavad Gita (10.27, which is part of the Mahabharata), a discourse by god Krishna to Arjuna. When Krishna declares himself to be the source of the universe, he declares that among horses, he is Uchchaihshravas—he who is born from the amrita.

=== Vishnu Purana ===
The Vishnu Purana records that when Prithu was installed as the first king on earth, others were also given kingship responsibilities. Uchchaihshravas was then made the king of horses.

=== Non-religious works ===
The twelfth-century Hariharacaturanga records once Brahma, the creator-god, performed a sacrifice, out of which rose a winged, white horse called Uchchaihshravas. Uchchaihshravas again rose out of the cosmic Ocean of Milk and was taken by the king of the demons (Asura) Bali, who used it to attain many impossible things.

The Kumarasambhava, by Kalidasa, narrates that Uchchaihshravas, the best of horses and symbol of Indra's glory, was stolen by the demon Tarakasura from heaven.

== In popular culture ==
- George Harrison's Dark Horse Records music label uses a logo inspired by Uchchaihshravas.
- In Warhorse Studios' video game Kingdom Come: Deliverance, Uchchaihshravas is one of the Tier-3 horses available for purchase in the village of Merhojed.

== See also ==
- List of fictional horses
