= Vajranga =

Asura in Hinduism

- Affiliation: Daitya, Asura
- Texts: Puranas

Genealogy
- Parents: Kashyapa, Diti
- Spouse: Varāṅgī
- Children: Tarakasura

Vajranga (Sanskrit: वज्राङ्ग, romanized: Vajrāṅga, lit. 'thunderbolt-limbs') is an asura in Hinduism. According to the Puranas, he was born to Diti and was fathered by the sage Kashyapa. Diti, being the mother of the asuras, sought revenge for the deaths of her children by the hands of the devas. Diti is said to have undergone severe austerities for ten thousand years in exchange for a boon which granted her a child who would slay the devas. Kashyapa granted her wish and they birthed Vajranga, whose body was like Indra's weapon, the vajra.

Vajranga is the father of the asura Tārakāsura, who continued his father's war with the devtas, but was ultimately vanquished by the war god, Kartikeya.

== Etymology ==
Vajranga is an adjective meaning "studded with diamonds".

Vajranga is a Sanskrit compound consisting of the terms vajra, meaning thunderbolt or diamond, and aṅka (अङ्क) meaning adorned.

Alternatively, the name Vajranaga, derived from vajra and nāga, means diamond serpent. In Vedic Hinduism, asuras such as Vritra are sometimes depicted as serpentine.

== Legend ==
Diti, ever jealous of her sister Aditi, asked for her consort Kashyapa to provide her a son who would be capable of defeating the devas, who were the sons of Aditi. Consenting, Kashyapa granted his wife Vajranga, possessing adamantine limbs, who performed her bidding by capturing Indra and the devas and punishing them. When Aditi protested, Brahma urged Vajranga to release his captives, who acquiesced, stating that he had only done what his mother had instructed. Pleased, Brahma created a wife for him known as Vajrangi, who was both alluring and loving. When he offered her a boon, she asked him to grant her a son who would capture the three worlds, and cause misery to the devas. Dumbstruck, he prayed to Brahma to grant him a good son, who was born as Tārakāsura.

Vajranga and Vajrangi lived in the forest for the rest of their life peacefully. They died of old age after thousands of years.
