= Iravati =

Character in Hindu mythology

Irāvatī
- Member of The Nāgas

Genealogy
- Parents: Kaśyapa (father); Kadru (mother)
- Children: Airāvata

Iravati (Sanskrit: इरावती, IAST: Irāvatī) is a figure in Hindu mythology. She is a daughter of Kadru or Bhadramada and Kashyapa, as featured in the Ramayana. She is also associated with a sacred Iravati river, which was one of the names of the river Ravi of modern-day Punjab during the Vedic period. It is possible that the river Irrawaddy of Myanmar traces its name to this name for the Ravi river.

== Legend ==
One legend states that Indra's divine elephant, Airavata, is the offspring of Iravati.

== See also ==
- Ganga
- Sarasvati
- Kalindi
