= Kadru =

Mother of the nagas in Hinduism

Genealogy
- Parents: Daksha (father), Panchajani (mother)
- Siblings: Aditi, Diti, Kālikā, Kapila, Surasa, Simhika, Viśvā, Vinata
- Spouse: Kashyapa
- Children: The Nāgas: Sons: Shesha, Vasuki, Karkotaka, Kaliya, Takshaka, etc. Daughters: Manasā, Irāvatī

Kadru (Sanskrit: कद्रू, lit. 'tawny', IAST: Kadrū) is usually regarded as the daughter of Daksha and the consort of the sage Kashyapa in Hindu scriptures. Kashyapa is the son of Marichi, who is a manasaputra, a mind-born son of Brahma. Kadru is best known as the mother of the nagas, the race of serpents.

Legends of Kadru detail her relationship with her elder sister Vinata, who was also one of Kashyapa's many wives. In one story, Kadru and Vinata vie to bear the children of Kashyapa who are more powerful than the other. While Kadru gives birth to a thousand nagas, Vinata bears two sons, Aruṇa and Garuda. Kadru is also portrayed as more scheming and wily than Vinata. She challenges Vinata to guess the colour of the tail of Uchchaihshravas, the divine white horse. After Vinata says the tail is white, Kadru tricks Vinata by directing her sons to coil around the horse's tail, causing it to appear black. As a result, Vinata loses the bet and she and her sons are forced to become the slaves of Kadru and her sons. Another legend states that when Kadru asks Garuda to take her sons on his back to the abode of the sun so that they can pay obeisance, they are scorched. Vinata asks Garuda to carry the water of the Ganga from the netherworld and sprinkle it on the nagas to revive them.

In another tale, Kadru and Suparna, another of Kashyapa's wives, disobey Kashyapa and disrupt some sages who are performing rites on the banks of the Ganga. As a result, they are turned into rivers. Kashyapa is only able to restore them to their original forms by performing a penance to Shiva.

== Family ==
Generally, Kadru is described as the daughter of Daksha Prajapati and the wife of the sage Maharishi Kashyapa. The Hindu epic Mahabharata, which gives a detailed tale about her, recognizes her as one of Kashyapa's many wives.

There is also a view that she was the daughter of Daksha, but it has not been established from Puranic literature. In the Aranyakanda of the Valmiki Ramayana it is mentioned that Daksaprajapati had sixty daughters of whom he married off Aditi, Diti, Danu, Tamra, Krodhavasa, Muni and Surasa to Kashyapa. Krodhavasa had eight daughters of whom Kadru was one. Thus, Kadru may alternatively be considered the granddaughter of Daksha. Vinata, Kadru's sister, is another wife of Kashyapa.

According to the Sabha Parva of the Mahabharata, Kadru lived in Brahmaloka, the abode of Brahma. In the Vana Parva of the Mahabharata it is stated that to destroy the embryo in a woman, Kadru enters her womb by assuming a very tiny form called "Skanda graha".

== Legend ==
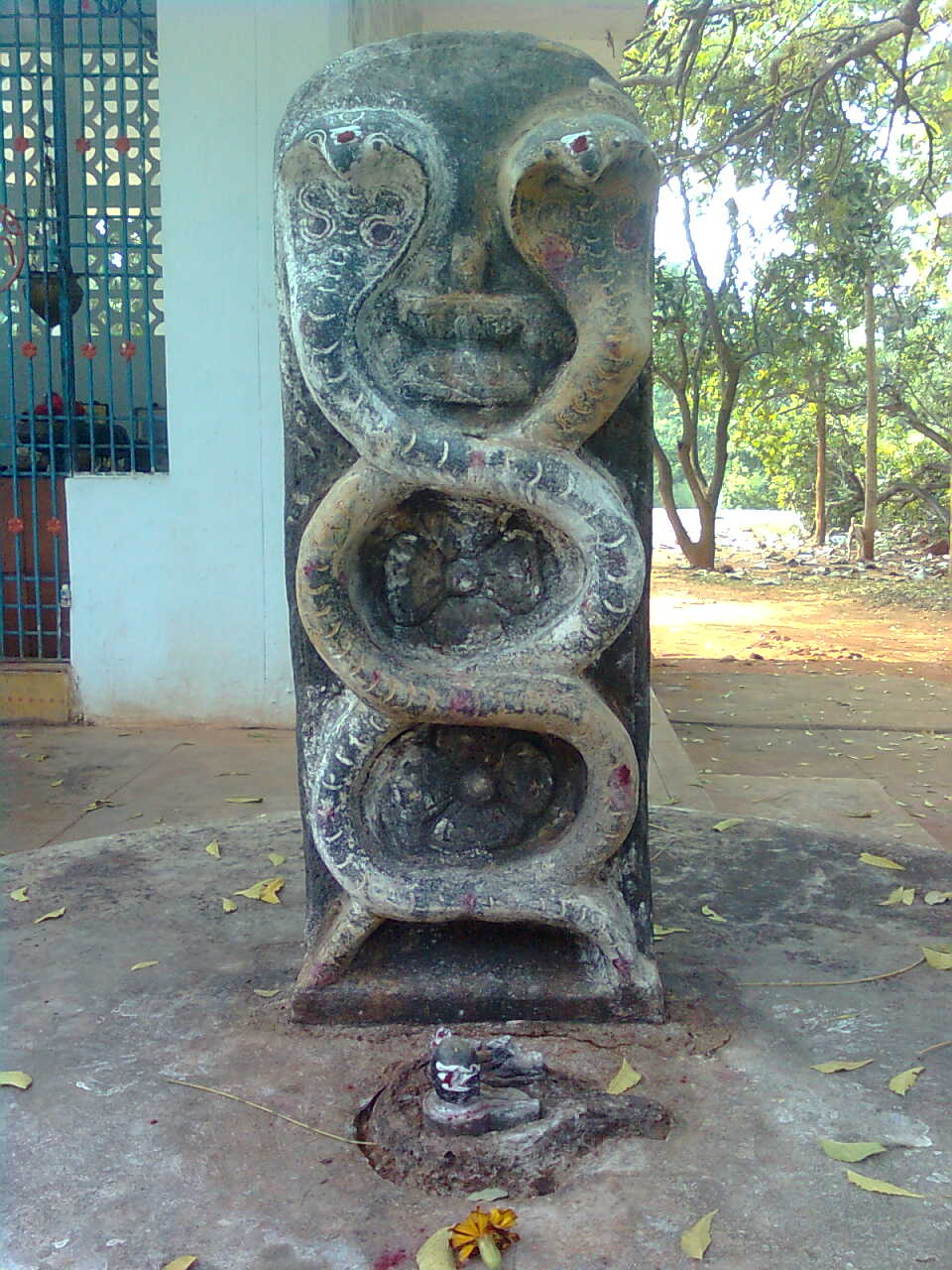
A relief of a naga or serpent deity in Gudilova, Andhra Pradesh, India

=== Boon ===
Kadru was the younger sister of Vinata, and when they both lived with Kashyapa as his wives and attended to all his comforts he blessed them by granting each of them a boon. Kadru asked for a thousand naga or serpent sons who should be valiant. Prompted by her sister's demand for sons, Vinata asked for only two sons who should be more powerful and bright than Kadru's children. Kashyapa granted them their wishes. After his wives became pregnant, he advised them to look after the children, and then left for his penance in the forest.

=== Children ===
After a long time Kadru gave birth to a thousand eggs and Vinata to two eggs. The eggs were carefully incubated in containers with hot water or in jars which were kept warm. After a lapse of five hundred years, the eggs laid by Kadru hatched and her sons came to life; of these thousand naga sons, the most prominent ones were Shesha, Vasuki and Takshaka. All the serpents born in this world are the descendants of these thousand sons. Vinata became jealous as her eggs had not hatched. In a moment of haste, she broke open one of the eggs, revealing a half-formed son. This son was enraged by his physical form and cursed his mother for her hasty act, saying she would be a slave to Kadru for five hundred years till the son from her second egg was born. He became a charioteer and herald for the sun god and the creator of the red sky at dawn, and was therefore named Aruṇa. Eventually, after five hundred years, Vinata's second son Garuda was born in the form of a huge bird with immense power. As soon as he was born he flew away with grace, seeking food.

According to the Brahma Purana, Kashyapa, who is also known as Prajapati Kashyapa, was approached by the Valakhilyas. Offering him half of their ascetic powers, they requested that he beget them a son who could take revenge on Indra who had insulted them. Kashyapa then had one son from each of his two wives, Kadru the mother of snakes and Suparna. Before going on an errand, Kashyapa instructed his wives not to leave the house as they would create mischief and do evil acts and eventually come to grief. In spite of these instructions, Kadru and Suparna went out to the banks of the Ganga where enlightened sages were performing sattra rites and started disturbing the rites. Infuriated, the sages cursed them to become rivers. Kashyapa returned home to find his wives, but was told of the incident by the sages. When Kashyapa asked how he might retrieve his wives, the sages advised him to do penance to Shiva at Gautami Ganga. Kashyapa prayed by reciting a hymn that praised Shiva in the role of a triad, his role in the three worlds, and his three gunas (qualities of virtue, merit, excellence). Pleased with Kashyapa's hymn, Shiva restored to him his wives, and blessed the wives so that they would beget children again by the grace of Ganga. Kashyapa invited the sages to participate in the fourth-to-sixth month hair-parting ceremony of his pregnant wives. After the sages were fed, when Kashyapa respectfully stood before them with his wife to thank them, Kadru looked at the sages and gave them a sly look with one of her eyes. The sages were annoyed and cursed Kadru to lose that eye. Thus, Kadru became one-eyed.

=== Enslavement of Vinata ===
Once, Kadru called Vinata and asked her to tell her the colour of Uchchaihshravas, the divine white horse that had emerged from the ocean when it was churned by the devas and asuras to generate nectar. Without any guile, Vinata said that it was pure white. Kadru contradicted her and said that its tail was black. An argument ensued, and Kadru challenged Vinata to a bet, saying that whoever lost the bet would have to become the other's servant. Intending to cheat Vinata, Kadru called her thousand sons to coil around Uchchaihshravas's tail neatly so that it appeared black in colour. While some of her sons obeyed her instructions, others refused to oblige her. Those who disobeyed her instructions were cursed by Kadru, and she prophesied that they would be charred alive in the sarpa satra yagna (snake sacrifice) that would be performed by King Janamejaya of Hastinapura. Kashyapa was upset by this curse, but Brahma who happened to be there told him such a curse was essential as serpents had become very dangerous to society. Brahma then gave Kashyapa the antidote for snake poisoning. Kadru won the bet as the nagas had wound around Uchchaihshravas's tail, giving it a black shade. Vinata thus became the slave of Kadru. She would eventually be freed by Garuda, when he brought Kadru and the nagas a pot of amṛtam, in an episode called the Amṛtakalaśāpaharaṇam.

=== Legend of Nagalaya ===
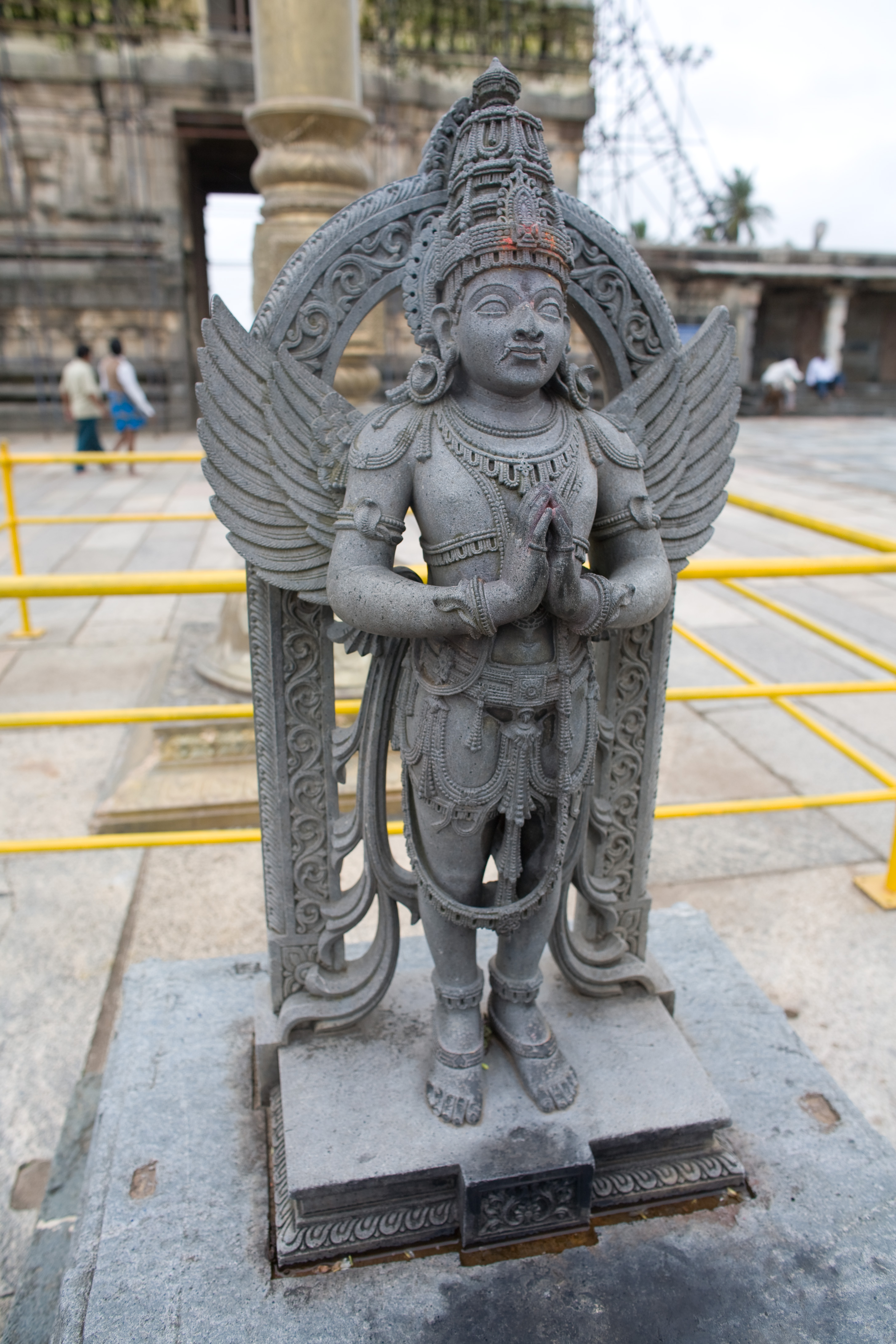
A statue of Garuda from the Chennakeshava Temple, Belur, Karnataka, India

On another occasion, Kadru suggested to Vinata that Vinata should take Kadru, and that Garuda should take her naga sons, to the beautiful island of Ramaniyaka in the middle of the ocean within the abode of snakes. Vinata and Garuda did as directed. After reaching the destination Kadru asked Garuda to take her sons to the abode of the sun to pay their respectful obeisance. Garuda carried the naga sons of Kadru on his back and approached the sun. As he flew closer, the nagas could not withstand the heat and started falling off him to the ground in a faint, on the island of Virana. Hearing the cries of her children, Kadru was deeply distressed and blamed Garuda for what had happened to her children. Vinata, distressed by her son's plight and, following a suggestion by Kadru, asked Garuda to bring water of the Ganga from the netherworld. Garuda obeyed and brought the water to the southern bank of the Gautami river and sprinkled it on the snakes, which then revived. The place where this incident occurred is called Nagalaya, the abode of the snakes. In another version of the story related in the Adi Parva of the Valmiki Ramayana, it is said that when the nagas fainted and fell to the ground due to intense heat of the sun, Kadru offered prayers to Indra to come to her children's rescue. Indra promptly created rain showers to fall on the nagas and they were restored from their charred state. They then lived in the island of Ramaniyaka.

== Bibliography ==
- Banker, Ashok K. (2012). The Forest of Stories. Chennai: Westland. ISBN 978-93-81626-37-5.
- Mani, Vettam (1975). "KADRŪ". Purāṇic Encyclopaedia: A Comprehensive Dictionary with Special Reference to the Epic and Purāṇic Literature. Delhi: Motilal Banarsidass. pp. 363–364. ISBN 978-0-8426-0822-0.
- Söhnen, Renate; Schreiner, Peter (1989). "Kadrū and Vinatā". Brahmapurāṇa: Summary of Contents, with Index of Names and Motifs. Wiesbaden: Otto Harrassowitz. pp. 253–255. ISBN 978-3-447-02960-5.
