= Diti =

Hindu mythology character

- Texts: Puranas, Ramayana, Mahabharata
- Gender: Female

Genealogy
- Parents: Daksha (father); Asikni (mother)
- Siblings: Sisters including Aditi, Danu, Kadru, Vinata, Surabhi, Krodha, Muni and Vishva
- Consort: Kashyapa
- Children: Daityas including Hiranyakashipu, Hiranyaksha and Holika; Maruts

Diti (Sanskrit: दिति) is a daughter of the Prajapati Daksha in Hinduism. She is a wife of the sage Kashyapa and the mother of the demonic race Daityas and the divine group of Marutas.

== Legend ==
According to the Puranic scriptures, Diti is one of the sixty daughters of Prajapati Daksha and his wife Asikni. She and her twelve sisters, including Aditi, were married to the sage Kashyapa. Diti is described as the mother of two groups of beings—the Daityas and the Maruts. The most prominent of her sons were Hiranyakashipu, Hiranyaksha, Vajranaka, Arunasura, Raktabija and Surapadman. Diti also had a daughter named Simhika (also known as Holika).

=== Birth of Hiranyaksha and Hiranyakashipu ===
The Bhagavata Purana describes the circumstances of the birth of the two powerful daityas:

Diti was one of the wives of Kaśyapa. She had no children while the other wives of Kaśyapa had children. Jealousy and grief rankled in her mind. One day she approached Kaśyapa and pressed him to beget a son for her. It was the time of dusk when Kaśyapa was deeply absorbed in his day’s devotional worship. She disturbed his "Dhyāna" (devotional concentration) by her importunity, but he was reluctant to yield to her wishes at such an inauspicious time. It is at dusk that Śiva goes about with his attendant hordes of spirits, wearing the crown of his matted hair covered with the dust carried by the whirlwinds from cremation grounds and keeping his three eyes wide open. Kaśyapa asked Diti to wait for a few minutes, until that terrible time was over, but she did not heed his advice. In the fury of her passion she sprang towards him and stripped him of his clothes and in the end Kaśyapa yielded to her carnal desires. But after the act he in a repentant mood told her that she had defiled her mind by having sexual union in that unholy hour and by doing so had sinned against the gods. As a result, twin sons will be born in her womb. They would persecute and torture the three worlds. Mahāviṣṇu would incarnate to destroy them. But since she also felt a little regret in her act, a grandson of her (Prahlāda) will become a devotee of Viṣṇu. Twin sons, Hiraṇyakaśipu and Hiraṇyākṣa were born to Diti.

— Bhagavata Purana

=== Birth of the maruts ===
After the death of her sons in the Samudra Manthana, Diti grew inconsolable. She begged her husband to grant her a child who would be capable of defeating Indra. In due course, Diti became pregnant and following her husband's advice, she engaged in tapas and remained chaste. When Indra discovered that the child in Diti's womb was to be his slayer, he took on the disguise of an attendant. Indra used his thunderbolt known as the vajra to splinter the fetus into many pieces, from which originated the marutas.

=== Personality ===
Diti is usually depicted as being cruel to both her husband Kashyapa, and her sister Aditi. She is obsessed with trying to bring the asuras into power. She is a bitter enemy of Aditi's sons, the devas, and she is instrumental in the asuras gaining control and autonomy over them.

== See also ==
- Aditi
- Danu
- Vinata
