= Muni (Hinduism) =

Wife of Kashyapa in Hindu mythology

- Texts: Puranas

Genealogy
- Parents: Daksha (father); Asikni (mother)
- Spouse: Kashyapa
- Children: Apsaras and Gandharvas

Muni (Sanskrit: मुनि, romanized: Muni) is one of the wives of Kashyapa. She is one of the sixty daughters of Daksha and his wife Asikni. She is the mother of the races of the apsaras and the gandharvas.

== Literature ==
The Brahmanda Purana states that twenty-four apsaras and the sixteen gandharvas are the children of Muni.

The Bhagavata Purana states that the apsaras were born from Kashyapa and Muni.
