= Vinata =

Mother of Garuda in Hinduism

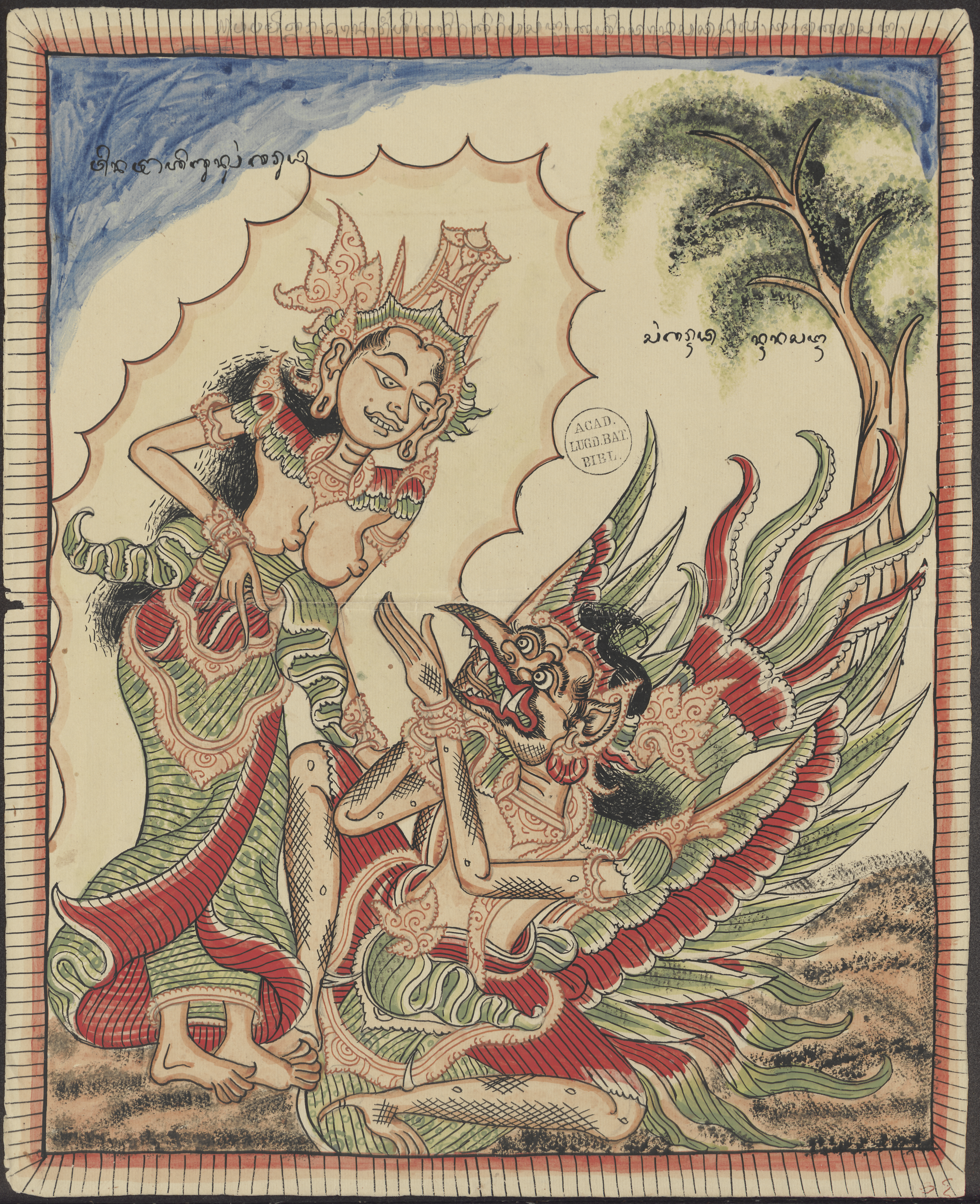
- Balinese art of Garuda seeking food from Vinata
- Texts: Puranas

Genealogy
- Parents: Daksha (father), Asikni (mother)
- Siblings: Aditi, Diti, Kālikā, Kapil, Surasa, Simhika, Viśvā, Kadru
- Spouse: Kashyapa
- Children: Aruṇa and Garuda, Sumati (daughter)

In Hinduism, Vinata (Sanskrit: विनता, IAST: Vinatā) is the mother of Aruna and Garuda. She is one of the daughters of Prajapati Daksha. She is married to Kashyapa, along with several of her sisters. She bears him two sons, the elder being Aruna and the younger being Garuda.

== Legend ==
Vinata is a daughter of Daksha. Kadru is her elder sister, and when they both lived with Kashyapa as his wives, and attended to all his comforts, he blessed them by granting each of them a boon. Kadru asked for a thousand naga sons who should be valiant. Prompted by her sister's demand for sons, Vinata asked for only two sons, who should be more powerful and brighter than Kadru's children. Kashyapa granted them their wishes. After his wives became pregnant, he advised them to look after the children, and then left for his penance in the forest.

=== Birth of Aruna ===
According to the Mahabharata, Kadru went on to lay a thousand eggs, and Vinata, two eggs. Both of them kept their eggs in hot pots. In their five-hundredth year, the eggs of Kadru hatched, and thousands of nagas of various kinds emerged out of them. The sight of Kadru playing with her children frustrated Vinata since her eggs had not hatched. Impatient, she broke open one of her eggs in secret, and a half-grown child stepped out of it. That child was Aruṇa. He was enraged that Vinata had forced open the egg prematurely. He told her that as punishment, she would become a slave of Kadru. Aruna also informed her of her source of redemption: After another 500 years, the remaining egg of hers would hatch, and a son endowed with exceptional power and prowess would be born to liberate her. Having proclaimed thus, Aruṇa rose to the sky, where he became the charioteer of Surya.

=== Slavery ===
After the events of the Samudra Manthana, Indra obtained a horse named Uccaihshravas from the Ocean of Milk. A dispute arose between Vinata and Kadru regarding the colour of the horse’s tail: Kadru asserted that it was black, while Vinata believed that it was white. They further agreed to observe the horse the next day, betting that she who was proved to be wrong would become the slave of the victor. As the naga sons of Kadrū hung on to the tail of the horse, the tail seemed to appear black. Thus, Vinatā lost the bet, and became Kadrū’s slave.

=== Birth of Garuda ===
When Garuda hatched from his egg, he was saddened to see that his mother was enslaved by her sister. When he sought an audience with Kadru, he was informed that the price of his mother's freedom was the elixir of immortality, amrita, which he would have to steal from Devaloka. Vinata instructed Garuda to consume any Nishada he came across on his journey to the realm for his sustenance, but not to devour a single Brahmana. Garuda succeeded in his task, and the fact that he had been able to defeat a number of celestial deities allowed him to invoke a boon from Vishnu, becoming his mount. He brought the pot of amrita to the nagas as promised, but the nectar was stolen by Indra. Nevertheless, this secured freedom of Vinata.

=== Association with the Solar Dynasty ===
The legend by which Garuda, and by extension, Vinata, became associated with the Suryavamsha lineage of royalty is present in the Brahmanda Purana:

Before the birth of Garuḍa when Kaśyapa and Vinatā were living together with their daughter Sumati the boy sage Upamanyu, son of Sutapas, went to them and told Kaśyapa thus: "While touring round the earth I worshipped the pitṛs at Gayā and I have been told that they (Pitṛs) would get redemption only in case I married and became a father. I, therefore, request you to please give your daughter Sumati to me as wife. Vinatā did not relish this proposal. Upamanyu got angry at the rejection of his offer and cursed Vinatā saying that if Sumati was given in marriage to any other brahmin boy she (Vinatā) would die with her head broken into pieces. It was during this period when Vinatā was in a fix about the marriage of Sumati that Garuḍa was born to her. He also thought over the problem and argued like this: the curse is only against a brahmin boy marrying my sister Sumati; why not Sumati be given in marriage to a Kṣatriya; but where to find an eligible Kṣatriya boy? At this stage Vinatā asked him to go and meet the Sannyāsin, who had promised her an illustrious son, in the forest and this Sannyāsin directed Garuḍa to Aurva, for advice and guidance. When Garuḍa met Aurva and sought his advice about the marriage of his sister, the sage thought that the context offered a very good bride to Sagara. And, according to Aurva’s advice Sumati was married to Sagara, and thus Garuḍa became related to the Kings of the Solar dynasty.

— Brahmanda Purana, Chapters 16 - 18
