= Gudilova =

Coordinates: 17.868976°N 83.325627°E

Gudilova is a neighbourhood of Visakhapatnam city, Visakhapatnam district, in the Indian state of Andhra Pradesh.
