= Krodhavasa =

Wife of Kashyapa in Hindu ancient history

- Devanagari: क्रोधवशा
- Region: Puranic universe

Genealogy
- Parents: Daksha (father)
- Consort: Kashyapa
- Children: Krodhavashas (ferocious animals, fanged beasts, and certain rakshasas)

Krodhavasha (Sanskrit: क्रोधवशा, IAST: Krodhavaśā) is a wife of the sage Kashyapa in Hindu mythology. She is described to be the mother of Surabhi, and the daughter of Daksha in the Ramayana. She is the mother of a class of asuras known as the Krodhavashas. According to legend, due to her short-tempered temperament, the children born to her are regarded to be ferocious animals, birds, and fish, and all the species with sharp teeth.

According to some texts, Krodhavasa had ten daughters : Mrigi, Mrigananda, Hari, Bhadramata, Matangi, Sharduli, Shveta, Surabhi, Surasa, and Kadru.

== Legend ==
According to a story from the epic Mahabharata, Bhima is on a pilgrimage to Gandharvamadana to pluck some saugandhika flowers to gift them to Draupadi. A Brahmin sage warns Bhima not to go there, as he himself was incapable of going up the mountain to pluck the flowers because of old age. Meanwhile, a saugandhika flower from the inaccessible mountain is carried by the wind and falls on Draupadi, while she had sent Bhima to fetch that very flower. Bhima, holding his mace and blowing a conch, walks through the thick forest to scare wild animals on his way to the mountain lake. While he walks through the forest, a strong wind (Vayu, representing Bhima's father) carries to him the sweet smell of the flower. His approach scares away the demons and spirits who were guarding the lake. Bhima then gathers the flowers from the lake. Krodavasha then enters the lake with a drawn sword and threatens Bhima. Bhima informs the demon that even Rama, a man, could kill demons. Bhima then attacks Krodavasha with his mace and breaks his sword. Krodavasha runs away in fright. Kubera appears on the scene and tells Bhima to take as many flowers as he wants.

== Bibliography ==
- Garrett, John (1871). A Classical Dictionary of India. Atlantic Publishers & Distri. pp. 155–. GGKEY:YTLNG1DG7JN.
- Mani, Vettam (1975). Puranic Encyclopaedia: A Comprehensive Dictionary With Special Reference to the Epic and Puranic Literature. Delhi: Motilal Banarsidass. ISBN 0-8426-0822-2.
- Warder, Anthony Kennedy Warder (1988). Indian Kāvya Literature: The bold style (Śaktibhadra to Dhanapāla). Motilal Banarsidass. ISBN 978-81-208-0450-0.
