= Aruna (Hinduism) =

Charioteer of the sun god in Hindu mythology

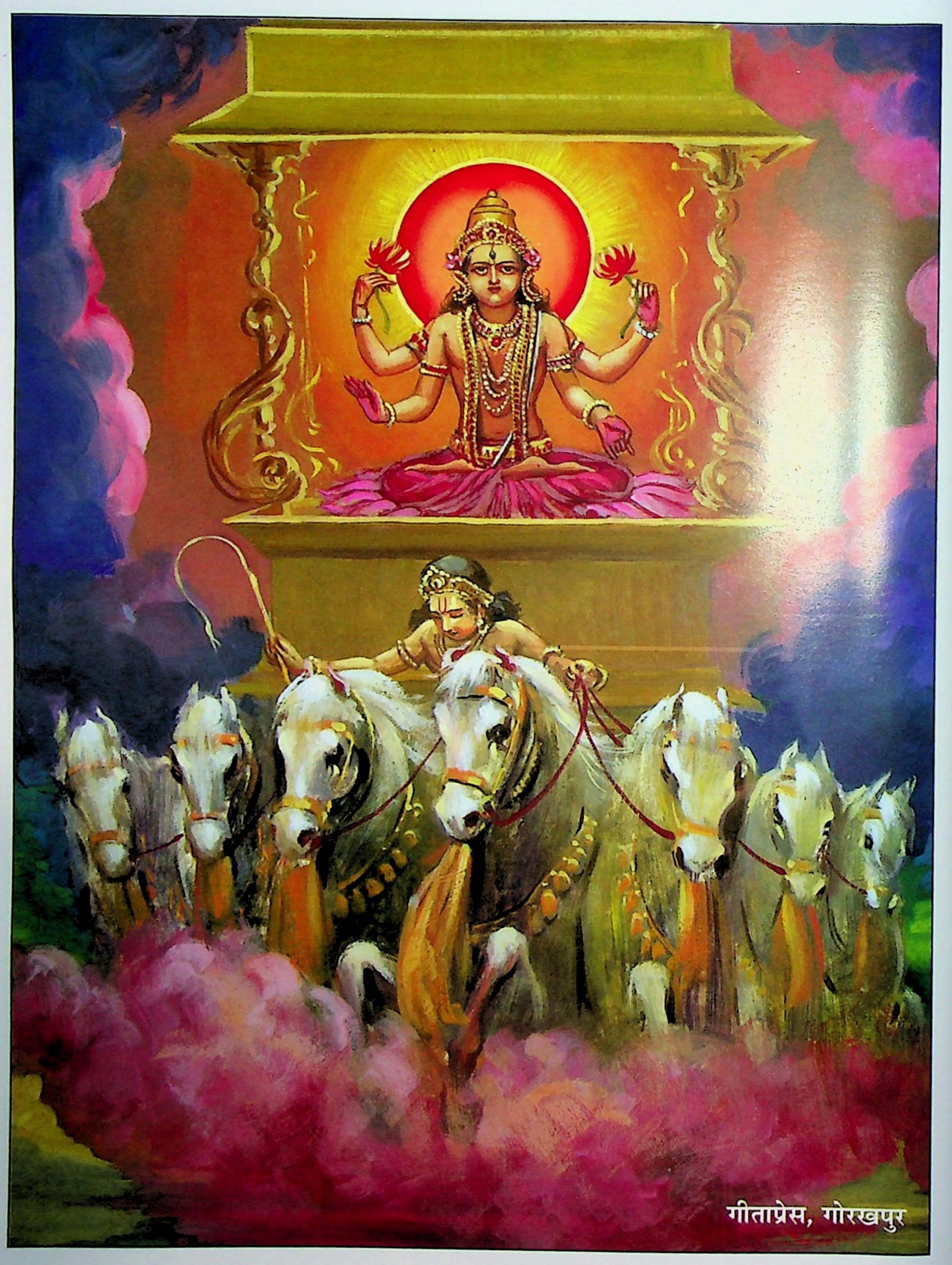
- A painter depicting Aruna driving the chariot of the sun god Surya
- Gender: Male

Genealogy
- Parents: Kashyapa (father); Vinata (mother)
- Siblings: Garuda
- Consort: Shyeni
- Children: Sampati and Jatayu (sons)

Aruna (Sanskrit: अरुण) is the charioteer of Surya (the sun god) in Hinduism. He is the elder brother of Garuda. Aruna and Garuda are the sons of Vedic sage Kashyapa and his wife Vinata, daughter of Prajapati Daksha. His children were the mighty vultures Sampati and Jatayu. He is also found in Buddhism and Jainism literature and arts.

== History ==
=== Birth ===
Aruna is found in different, inconsistent Indian legends. In the epic Mahabharata, he was born prematurely and partially developed from an egg. According to this version, Kashyapa Prajapati's two wives Vinata and Kadru wanted to have children. Kashyapa granted them a boon. Kadru asked for one thousand 'Dirghadeha' (meaning long bodied) Nāga (serpent) sons, while Vinata wanted only two yet extremely strong 'Divyadeha' (meaning emitting golden aura from body), who would excel the thousand sons of Kadru. Kashyapa blessed them, and then went away to a forest. Later, Kadru gave birth to one thousand eggs, while Vinata gave birth to two eggs. These incubated for five hundred years, upon which Kadru broke the eggs open and out came her 1,000 sons. Vinata eager for her sons, broke one of the eggs from which emerged the partially formed Aruna. Since Aruna was born prematurely, only the upper half of his body had developed. Enraged by his mother's haste, he cursed her to become a slave of Kadru for 500 years, upon which her second egg would break and his brother would emancipate her. Having cursed his mother, Aruna rose to the skies, and was bestowed the position of charioteer to Surya by his father, Prajapati Kasyapa. Accordingly, Vinata waited, and later the fully developed mighty eagle, her second born named Garuda (the mount of Vishnu) was born.

The epic narrates that in another tale that Surya began burning intensely, angered by the attacks of Rahu (Rahu swallowing Surya is described to cause solar eclipses in Hindu mythology). The heat was so intense that it started destroying all living beings. Then, the creator Brahma asked Aruna to become the charioteer of Surya, to shield all living beings from his terrible heat.

=== In the epics ===
According to the Ramayana, Aruna was married to Shyeni with whom he had two sons – Jatayu and Sampati. Both of them would play a very important role in the epic.

There is a legend in the Mahabharata that Surya once offered Aruna and his divine chariot to his son Karna which he denied as he didn't want to rely on others to win the war, especially against Arjuna whom he acknowledged as a capable rival.

Another legend, generally told in Indian folk tales linked to the Ramayana, states that Aruna, once became a woman named Aruni and entered an assembly of Apsara (celestial nymphs), where no man except Indra (the king of heaven) was allowed. Indra fell in love with Aruni and fathered a son named Vali from her. The next day, at Surya's request, Aruna again assumed female form, and Surya fathered a son named Sugriva. Both children were given to Ahalya for rearing, but her husband, the sage Gautama cursed them, causing them to turn into monkeys, as he did not like them.

== General references ==
- Dictionary of Hindu Lore and Legend (ISBN 0-500-51088-1) by Anna Dallapiccola
- Monier Monier-Williams: A Sanskrit-English Dictionary. Oxford U Pr, 1899.
- Robert Graves: The Greek Myths. 1955.
- Devī-Bhāgavata Purāṇa 10:13
- Mani, Vettam (1975). Puranic Encyclopaedia: a Comprehensive Dictionary with Special Reference to the Epic and Puranic Literature. Motilal Banarsidass Publishers. ISBN 978-0-8426-0822-0.
- Freeman, Rich (2001). "Thereupon Hangs a Tail: the Deification of Vali in the Teyyam Worship of Malabar". In Richman, Paula (ed.). Questioning Rāmāyaṇas: a South Asian Tradition. University of California Press. ISBN 978-0-520-22074-4.
