= Kashyapa =

Vedic sage

- Member of Saptarishi
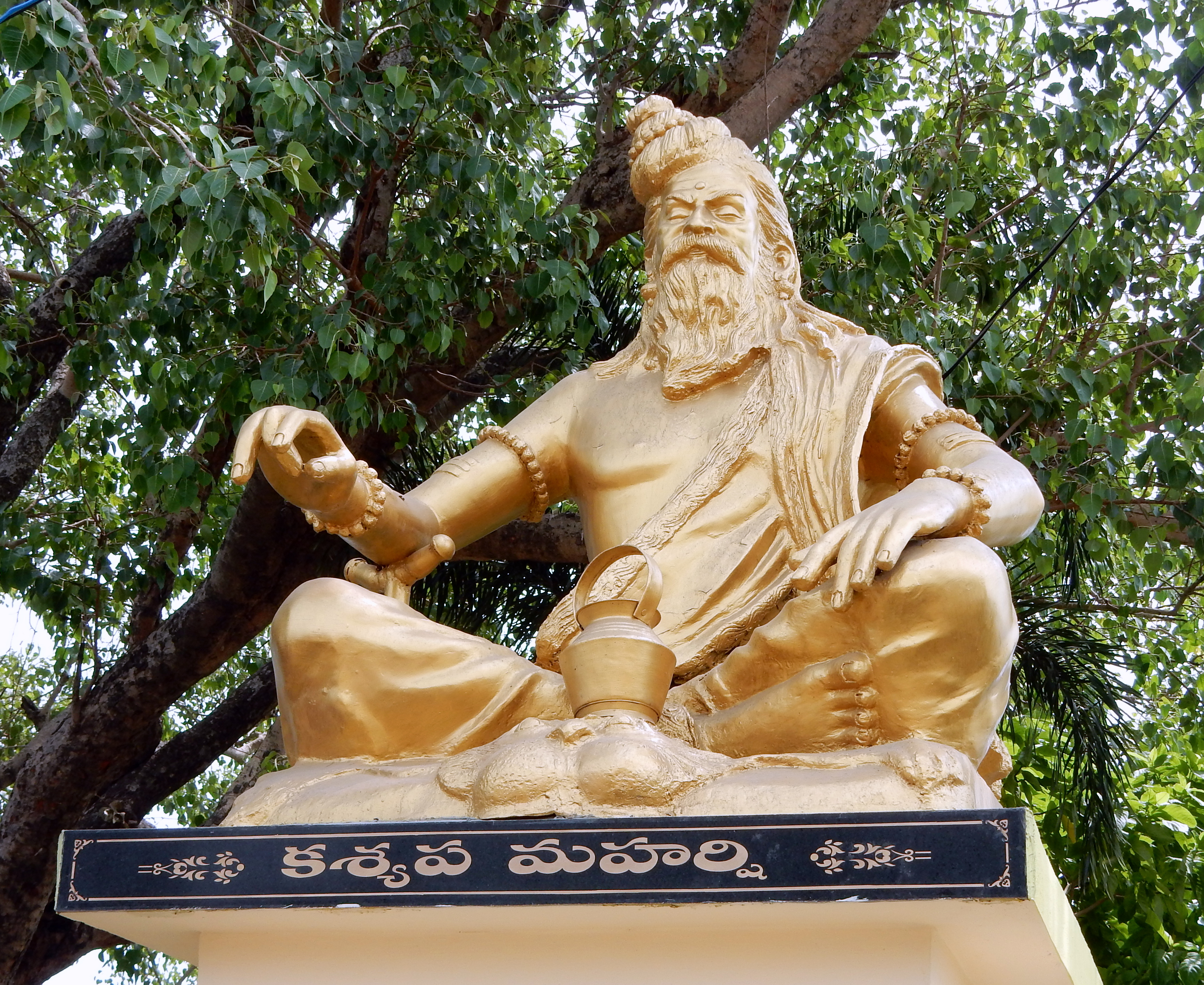
- Statue of Kashyapa in Andhra Pradesh, India
- Devanagari: कश्यप
- Affiliation: Maharishis

Genealogy
- Parents: Marichi (father); Kalā (mother)
- Spouse: Aditi, Diti, Kadru, Danu, Arishta, Surasa, Surabhi, Vinata, Tamra, Krodhavasha, Ira, Yamini, Kastha, Timi, Patangi, Sarama, Vishva and Muni
- Children: Adityas, Rudras, Vasus, Daityas, Maruts, Danavas, Nāgas, Manasa, Iravati, Gandharvas, Aruna, Garuda, Apsaras, etc.

Kashyapa (Sanskrit: कश्यप, IAST: Kaśyapa) is a revered Vedic sage of Hinduism. He is one of the Saptarishis, the seven ancient sages of the Rigveda. In the Ramayana, he is referred as Arishtanemi. Kashyapa is the most ancient and venerated rishi, along with the other Saptarishis, listed in the colophon verse in the Brihadaranyaka Upanishad.

Kashyapa is an ancient name, referring to many different personalities in the ancient Hindu and Buddhist texts.

== Name ==
Kashyapa means "turtle" in Sanskrit. According to Michael Witzel, it is related to Avestan kasiiapa, Sogdian kyšph, Kurdish kûsî, New Persian kharwar, kaš(a)p which mean "tortoise", after which Kashaf Rūd (a river in Turkmenistan and Khorasan) is named. Other relations include to Tocharian B kaccāp ("brainpan"), Tocharian A kāccap ("turtle", "tortoise"). Frits Staal agrees that Kaśyapa means 'tortoise', but believes that it is a non-Indo-European word.

== History ==
Kashyapa is credited with composing a few hymns in the Rigveda, mainly in Mandala IX. He and his family of students are mainly composers of hymns for Soma Pavamāna ("self-purifying Soma"), which represents a single moment in the Soma sacrifice.

He is mentioned in verse 2.2.4 of the Brihadaranyaka Upanishad, along with Atri, Vashistha, Vishvamitra, Jamadagni, Bharadwaja and Gautama. Kashyapa is also mentioned as the earliest rishi in colophon verse 6.5.3 of Brihadaranyaka Upanishad, one of the oldest Upanishadic scriptures of Hinduism.

Kashyapa is mentioned in other Vedas and numerous other Vedic texts. For example, in one of several cosmology-related hymns of Atharvaveda (~1000 BCE), Kashyapa is mentioned in the allegory-filled Book XIX:

Undisturbed am I, undisturbed is my soul,
undisturbed mine eye, undisturbed mine ear,
undisturbed is mine in-breathing, undisturbed mine out-breathing,
undisturbed my diffusive breath, undisturbed the whole of me.

Thereafter rose Desire in the beginning, Desire the primal seed and germ of Spirit,
O Kama dwelling with the lofty Kama, give growth of riches to the sacrificer, (...)
Prolific, thousand eyed, and undecaying, a horse with seven reins Time bears us onward,
Sages inspired with holy knowledge mount him, his chariot wheels are all the worlds of creatures.

Kala [Time] created yonder heaven, and Kala made these realms of earth,
By Kala, stirred to motion, both what is and what shall be, expand, (...)
Kala created living things and first of all Prajapati,
From Kala self-made Kasyapa, from Kala Holy Fire was born.

— Atharvaveda, Book XIX, Hymns L51-53

His name appears in Patanjali's ancient bhasya on verse 1.2.64 of Pāṇini. His name is very common in the Epic and Purana literature.

=== Buddhist texts ===
In Buddhist Pali canonical texts such as Digha Nikaya, Tevijja Sutta describes a discussion between the Buddha and Vedic scholars of his time. The Buddha names ten rishis, calls them "early sages" and makers of ancient verses that have been collected and chanted in his era, and among those ten rishi is Kassapa (the Pali spelling of Kashyapa in Sanskrit). (Note: The Buddha names the following as "early sages" of Vedic verses, "Atthaka (either Astaka or Atri), Vamaka, Vamadeva, Vessamitta (Visvamitra), Yamataggi, Angirasa, Bharadvaja, Vasettha (Vashistha), Kassapa (Kashyapa) and Bhagu (Bhrigu)".)

=== Kashmir ===
According to Christopher Snedden, the name Kashmir is a shortened form of "Kashyapa Mira", or the "lake of the sage Kashyapa". Alternatively, it may come from a Kashmiri or Sanskrit term that means "to dry up water". It could also have been derived from the term "Kashyapa Meru", which means the sacred mountains of Kashyapa.

In ancient texts of Greece, linked to the expedition of Alexander, this land has been called "Kasperia", possibly a contraction of "Kasyapamira". The word "Kaspapyros" appears in Greek geographer Hekataois text, and as "Kaspatyros" in Herodotus, who states that Skylax the Karyandian began in Kaspatyros to trace the path of Indus river from the mountains to where it drained in the sea. Kaspatyros may be same as Kaspa-pyrus or Kashyapa-pura (city of Kashyapa) in other texts.

== Legends ==
Kashyapa is mentioned in numerous Hindu texts such as the Puranas and the Hindu Epics. The stories related to Kashyapa in different texts are widely inconsistent, and many are considered allegorical. For example, in the Ramayana, he is married to the eight daughters of Daksha, while in the Mahabharata and Vishnu Purana he is described as married to thirteen daughters. Some of the names of the thirteen daughters Kashyapa married in the Hindu text Vishnu Purana are different from the list found in Mahabharata. Some texts describe Kashyapa as the son of Marichi, ancestor of solar dynasty, a contemporary with Uttamapada the second king of Brahmavarta and who married daughters of Daksha Prajapati the son of Brahma, others mention about him marrying daughters of Daksha Prajapati the last king of Brahmavarta, 15 in male descent from Uttamapada. It may be supposed that there have existed several persons named Kashyapa all of whom are usually confounded.

In some Puranas, Kashyapa is said to have drained the Kashmir Valley to make it inhabitable. Some interpret this legend to parallel the legend of Buddhist Manjushri draining Nepal and Tibet, wherein the "draining" is an allegory for teaching ideas and doctrines, removing stagnant waters of ignorance and extending learning and civilization into the valley. The city of Multan (now in Pakistan), also called Mulasthana, has been interpreted alternatively as Kashyapapura in some stories after Kashyap. Yet another interpretation has been to associate Kashyapa as Indus River in the Sindh region. However, these interpretations and the links of Multan as Kashyapapura to Kashmir have been questioned.

According to the ancient legends, Kashyapa reclaimed that land from a vast lake, his school was based there, and the land was named after him.

=== Wives and children ===
The Puranas and the Epics of Indian tradition mention Kashyapa and his genealogy numerous times. In the Vishnu Purana, Kashyap marries thirteen daughters of Daksha: Aditi, Diti, Kadru, Danu, Arishta, Surasa, Surabhi, Vinata, Tamra, Krodhavasha, Ira, Vishva and Muni, while in the Mahabharata, the names of these 13 wives are Aditi, Diti, Kala, Danayus, Danu, Simhika, Krodha, Pritha, Visva, Vinata, Kapila, Muni and Kadru. There are various interpretations. Scholar Vettam Mani, after analysing the epics and Puranas, concluded that Kashyapa may have married 21 women (13 of which were Daksha's daughters) — Aditi, Diti, Danu, Arishta, Surasha, Khasha, Surabhi, Vinata, Tamra, Krodhavasha, Ira, Kadru, Muni, Puloma, Kalaka, Nata, Danayus, Simhika, Pradha, Visva and Kapila.

Kashyapa, in the Vishnu Purana and Vayu Purana, is credited with fathering the Devas, Danavas, Yakshas, Daityas and all living creatures with various daughters of Daksha. He married Aditi, with whom he fathered the Adityas, and in two inconsistent versions Vamana, an avatar of Vishnu, is the child of Aditi and Kashyapa. In these religious texts, Kashyapa is the brother-in-law of Dharma and Adharma, both of whom are also described as married to other daughters of Daksha.

=== Kashyapa incarnated as Vasudeva ===
Kashyapa also incarnated as Vasudeva, the father of Krishna due to a curse that Brahma unleashed upon him. Once, the sage performed a yajña (a Vedic ritual) in his hermitage in order to offer oblations to the Devas for the welfare of the beings in the world. To perform the ritual, Kashyapa required offerings such as milk, ghee etc., for which he sought the help of Varuna. When Varuna manifested before him, Kashyapa requested him for a boon of limitless offerings to perform the yajña successfully. Varuna offered him a holy cow which would provide him with limitless offerings. He then told the sage that the holy cow would be taken back once the yajña was over. The yajña went on for several days, and with the presence of the holy cow, the sage never faced any obstacles.

Realizing the miraculous power of the cow, he was overcome with greed and desired to own the cow forever. He did not return the cow to Varuna even after the yajña was over. Varuna appeared in front of Kashyapa and told him that the cow was given to him as a boon, only for the yajña, and now that the yajña was over, it had to be returned as it belonged to the heaven. Kashyapa refused to part with the cow and told Varuna that whatever is offered to a Brahmana should never be sought back, and whoever does that would turn out to be a sinner.

Hence, Varuna sought the help of Brahma who appeared before the sage and told him to get rid of his greed which is capable of destroying all his virtues. Nevertheless, Kashyapa remained firm in his resolve, which enraged Brahma who cursed him, saying that he would be born on earth again as a cowherd. Kashyapa repented for his mistake and pleaded Brahma to forgive him. Brahma also realized that he had cursed him in a haste, and told him that he would still be born as a cowherd in the Yadava clan, but Vishnu would be born as his son. This was how Kashyapa was born as Vasudeva and became the father of Krishna.

== Attributions ==
Kashyapa is revered in the Hindu tradition, and numerous legends and texts composed in the medieval era are reverentially attributed to him in various Hindu traditions. Some treatises named after him or attributed to him include:

- Kashyapasamhita, also called Vriddajivakiya Tantra or Jivakiya Tantra, is a classical reference book on Ayurvedic pediatrics, gynecology and obstetrics. It was revised by Vatsya. The treatise is written as a tutorial between the medical sage Kashyapa and his student named Vriddhajivaka, and mostly related to caring for babies and diseases of children.
- Kashyapa Jnanakanda, or Kashyapa's book of wisdom, is a 9th-century text of the Vaishnavism tradition.
- Kaśyapa dharmasutra, likely an ancient text, but now believed to be lost. The text's existence is inferred from quotes and citations by medieval Indian scholars.
- Kaśyapasangīta, likely another ancient text, but now believed to be lost. A treatise on music, it is quoted by Shaivism and Advaita scholar Abhinavagupta, wherein he cites sage Kasyapa explanation on viniyoga of each rasa and bhava. Another Hindu music scholar named Hrdanyangama mentions Kashyapa's contributions to the theory of alankara (musical note decorations).
- Kashyapashilpa, also called Amsumad agama, Kasyapiya or Silpasastra of Kaśyapa, is a Sanskrit treatise on architecture, iconography and the decorative arts, probably completed in the 11th century.

== See also ==
- Atri
- Agastya
- Kassapa Buddha
- Suryavansha
- Ikshvaku dynasty
- Aditi
- Danu (Asura)
- Diti
- Mahākāśyapa
- Kāśyapīya
- House of Suren
- Vasudeva
- Shandilya
- Mudgala
