= Garuda =

Eagle-like demigod in Hindu mythology

- God of Strength and Vigilance
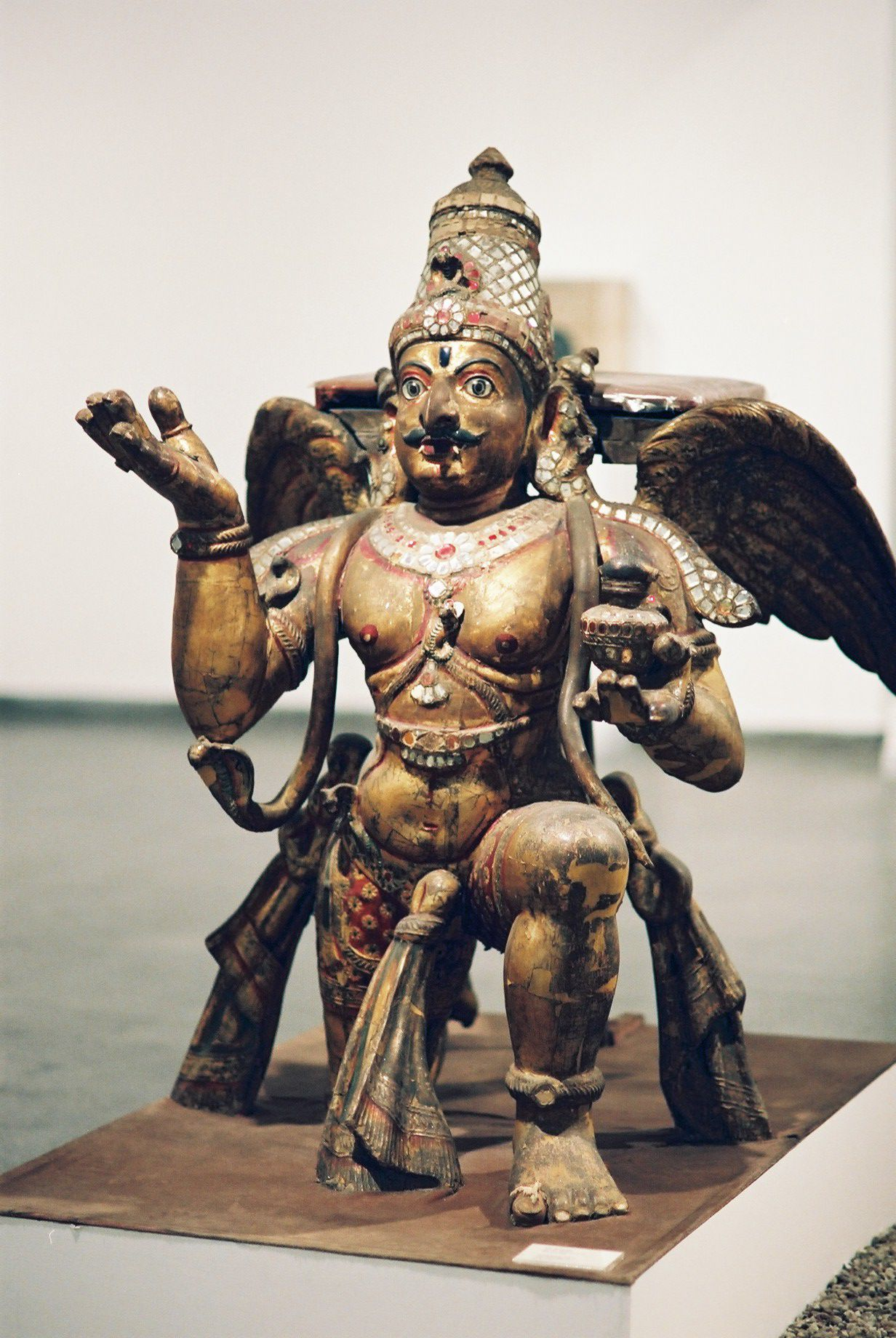
- Garuda, carved wooden sculpture, 19th Century. National Museum, New Delhi.
- Devanagari: गरुड
- Sanskrit transliteration: Garuḍa
- Affiliation: Devotee of Vishnu (Hinduism); Dharmapala (Buddhism); Shantinatha (Jainism)

Genealogy
- Parents: Kashyapa and Vinata
- Siblings: Aruṇa (brother), Sumati (sister); Nāgas, Devas, Gandharvas, Daityas, Danavas, Vanaras, and Yakshas (half-siblings)
- Spouse: Unnati
- Children: Sumukha (son)

Garuda (Sanskrit: गरुड, romanized: Garuḍa; Pali: गरुळ, romanized: Garuḷa) is a Hindu deity who is primarily depicted as the mount (vahana) of the Hindu god Vishnu. Garuda is mentioned in the Hindu, Buddhist, and Jain faiths. He is also the half-brother of the Devas, Gandharvas, Daityas, Danavas, Nāgas, Vanaras and Yakshas. He is the son of the sage Kashyapa and Vinata. He is the younger brother of Aruna, the charioteer of the Sun. Garuda is mentioned in several other texts such as the Puranas and the Vedas.

Garuda is described as the king of the birds and a kite-like figure. He is shown either in a zoomorphic form (a giant bird with partially open wings) or an anthropomorphic form (a man with wings and some bird-like features). Garuda is generally portrayed as a protector with the power to swiftly travel anywhere, ever vigilant and an enemy of every serpent. He is also known as Tarkshya and Vainateya.

Garuda is a part of the state insignia of India, Indonesia and Thailand. Both Indonesia and Thailand have Garuda as their coat of arms, and the Indian Army uses the Garuda on its Guards Brigade Regimental Insignia. The Indian Air Force named their special operations unit after him as the Garud Commando Force.

The name Garuda is often associated with the Greater adjutant stork (Leptoptilos dubius).

== Hinduism ==
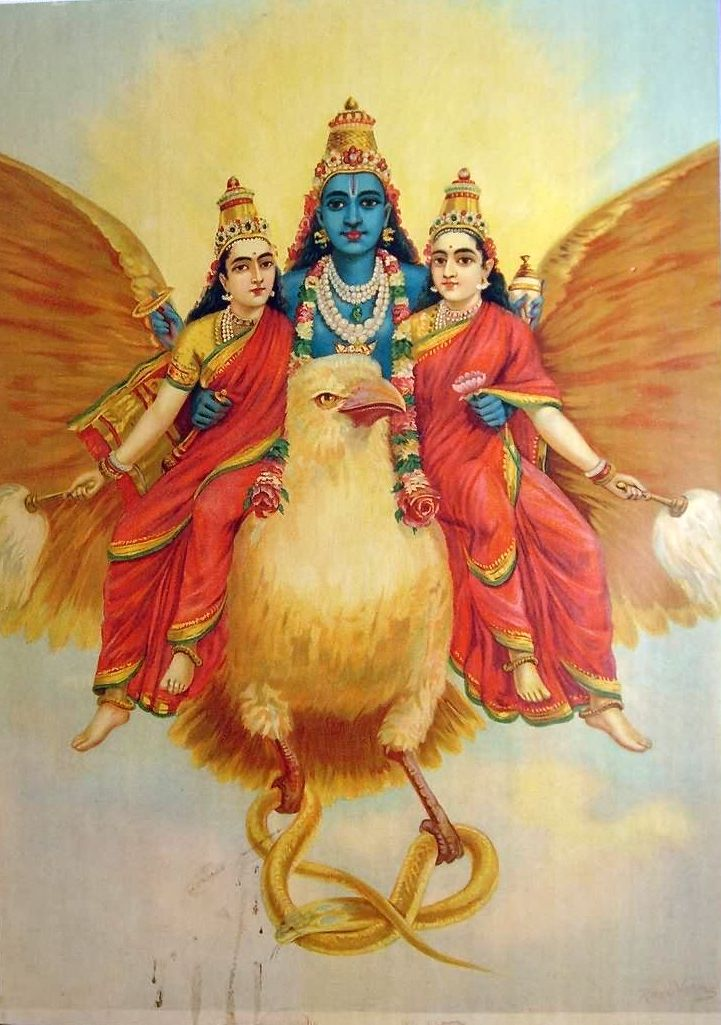
Lord Garuda, Raja Ravi Varma

In Hinduism, Garuda is a divine eagle-like sun bird and the king of birds. A Garutman is mentioned in the Rigveda who is described as celestial deva with wings. The Shatapatha Brahmana embedded inside the Yajurveda text mentions Garuda as the personification of courage. In the Mahabharata, Garutman is stated to be same as Garuda, then described as the one who is fast, who can shapeshift into any form and enter anywhere. He is a powerful creature in the epics, whose wing flapping can stop the spinning of heaven, earth and hell. He is described to be the vehicle mount of the Hindu god Vishnu, and typically they are shown together. He is the younger brother of Aruna, who is a charioteer of the sun god, Surya.

According to George Williams, Garuda has roots in the verb gri, or speak. He is a metaphor in the Vedic literature for rik (rhythms), saman (sounds), yajna (sacrifices), and the atman (Self, deepest level of consciousness). Williams states that in the Puranas, Garuda becomes a literal embodiment of the idea, and the Self who attached to and inseparable from the Supreme Self (Vishnu). Though Garuda is an essential part of the Vaishnavism, he also features prominently in Shaivism, Shaiva texts such as the Garuda Tantra and Kirana Tantra, and Shiva temples as a bird and as a metaphor of atman.

=== Iconography ===
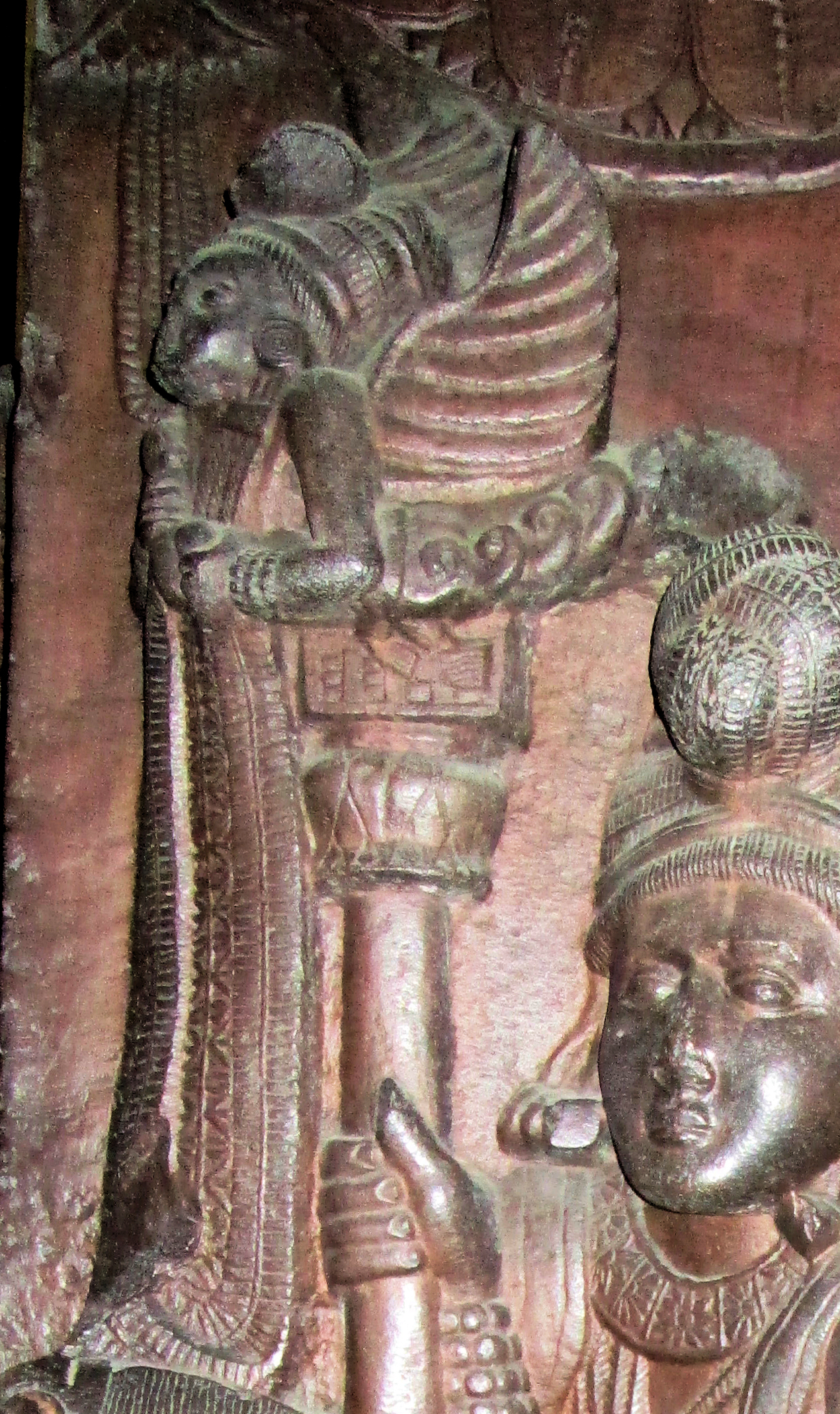
Relief depicting a portable Garuda pillar, one of the oldest images of Garuda, Bharhut, c. 100 BCE.

The Hindu texts on Garuda iconography vary in their details. If in the bird form, he is eagle-like, typically with the wings slightly open as if ready and willing to fly wherever he needs to. In part human-form, he may have an eagle-like nose, beak or legs, his eyes are open and big, his body is the colour of emerald, and his wings are golden-yellow. He may be shown with either two or four hands. If he is not carrying Vishnu, he holds a jar of amrita (immortality nectar) in one hand in the rear and an umbrella in the other, while the front pair of hands are in anjali (namaste) posture. If he is carrying Vishnu, the rear hands provide the support for Vishnu's feet.

According to the text Silparatna, states Rao, Garuda is best depicted with only two hands and with four bands of colours: "golden yellow colour from feet to knees, white from knees to the navel, scarlet from navel to neck, and black above the neck". His hands, recommends the text, should be in abhaya (nothing to fear) posture. In Sritatvanidhi text, the recommended iconography for Garuda is a kneeling figure, who wears one or more serpents, pointed bird-beak like nose, his two hands in namaste posture. This style is commonly found in Hindu temples dedicated to Vishnu.

In some iconography, Garuda carries Vishnu and his two consorts by his side: Sridevi and Bhudevi.

Garuda iconography is found in early temples of India, such as on the underside of the eave at entrance of Cave 3 of the Badami cave temples (6th century).

=== Beliefs ===
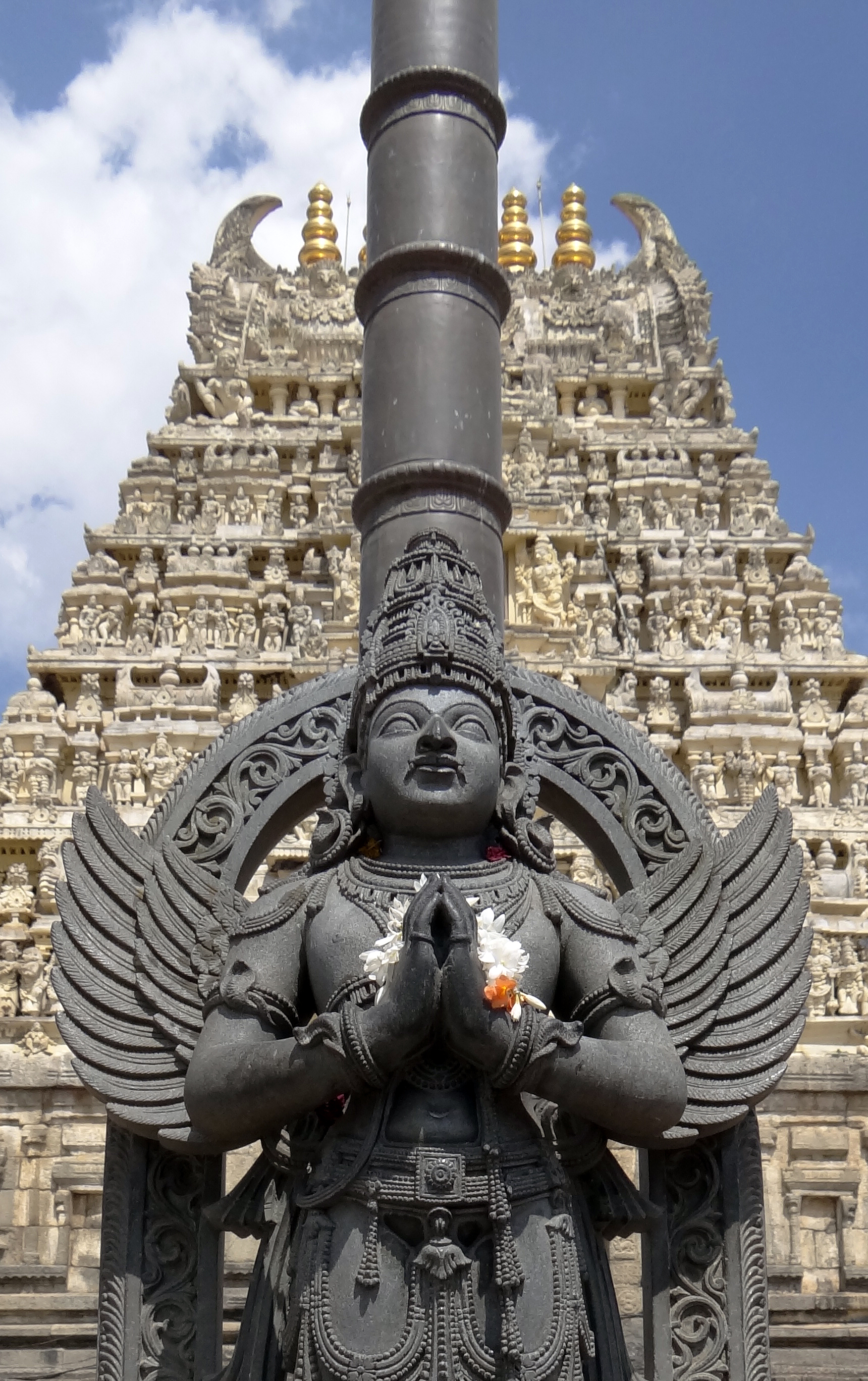
Garuda is found in Vishnu temples; above: in Belur, Karnataka

Garuda's mythology is linked to that of Aruna, the charioteer of the Hindu sun god Surya. Both Aruna and Garuda developed from an egg. According to one version related by George Williams, Kashyapa Prajapati's two wives Vinata and Kadru wanted to have children, and Kashyapa granted each of them a boon. Kadru asked for one thousand Nāga sons, while Vinata asked for just two, but each an equal to all of Kadru's thousand sons. Kashyapa blessed them, and then retreated to a forest to meditate. Later, Kadru gave birth to one thousand eggs, while Vinata gave birth to two eggs. After incubating them for five hundred years, Kadru's eggs hatched and out came her 1,000 sons. Vinata, eager for her own sons, impatiently broke one of her eggs. From this egg emerged the partially formed Aruna, looking radiant and reddish as the morning sun, but not as bright as the midday sun as he was promised to be. Aruna chided his mother Vinata for her impatience, and warned her to not break open the second egg, cursing her to be a slave until his brother rescued her. Aruna then left to become the charioteer of Surya, the sun god.

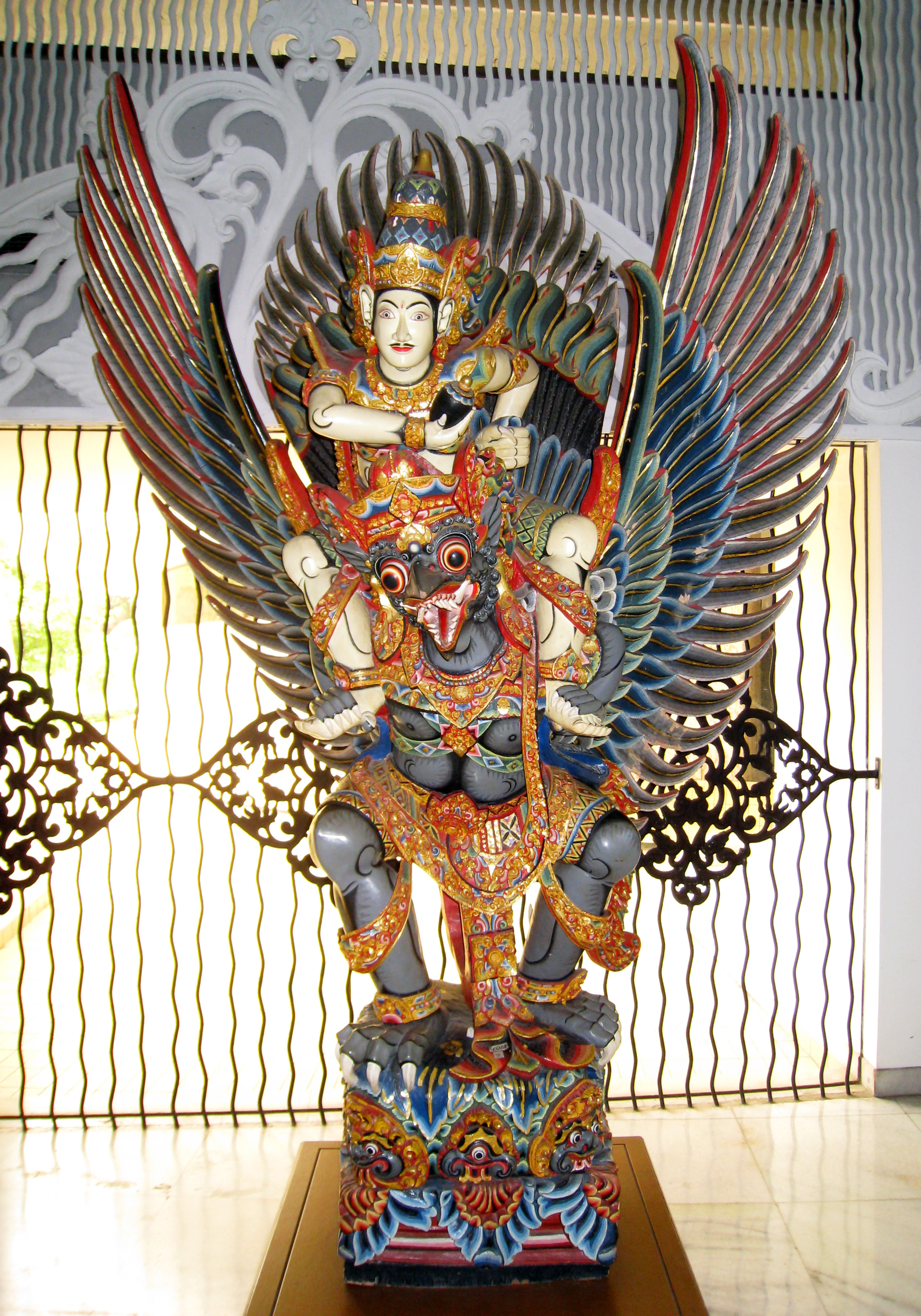
Balinese wooden statue of Vishnu riding Garuda, Purna Bhakti Pertiwi Museum, Jakarta, Indonesia.

Vinata waited, and after many years, the second egg hatched and Garuda was born. After losing a bet to Kadru through trickery, Vinata was forced to become her slave. Garuda later asked his brothers to free his mother from her slavery, to which they demanded Amrita from heaven. Garuda waged a war against gods with his extraordinary might and abilities, and defeated all of them, including Indra. He then took Indra's nectar vessel and flew back to earth. Vishnu then came to Garuda, and asked him to be his ride, to which he agreed. Indra requested that Garuda not give the Amrita to the Nagas though, as it would bring great trouble later, so they forged a plan. Upon reaching his brothers Garuda placed the vessel before them, and asked them to first purify themselves before drinking. Meanwhile, Jayanta (Indra's son) stole the vessel back. On returning, the nagas were all devoured by Garuda.

Some myths present Garuda as so massive that he can block out the sun. The text Garuda Purana is named after him.

Garuda is presented in the Mahabharata as one who eats snake meat, such as the story about him planning to kill and eat Sumukha snake, where Indra intervenes. Garuda in anger, vaunt about his feats and compares himself to Indra's equal. Vishnu teaches a lesson to Garuda and cured his pride on might. Garudas are also a race of birds who devour snakes in the epic.

The Suparṇākhyāna, a late Vedic period poem considered to be among the "earliest traces of epic poetry in India," relates the legend of Garuda, and provides the basis for a later, expanded version which appears within the Mahābhārata.

=== Symbolism ===
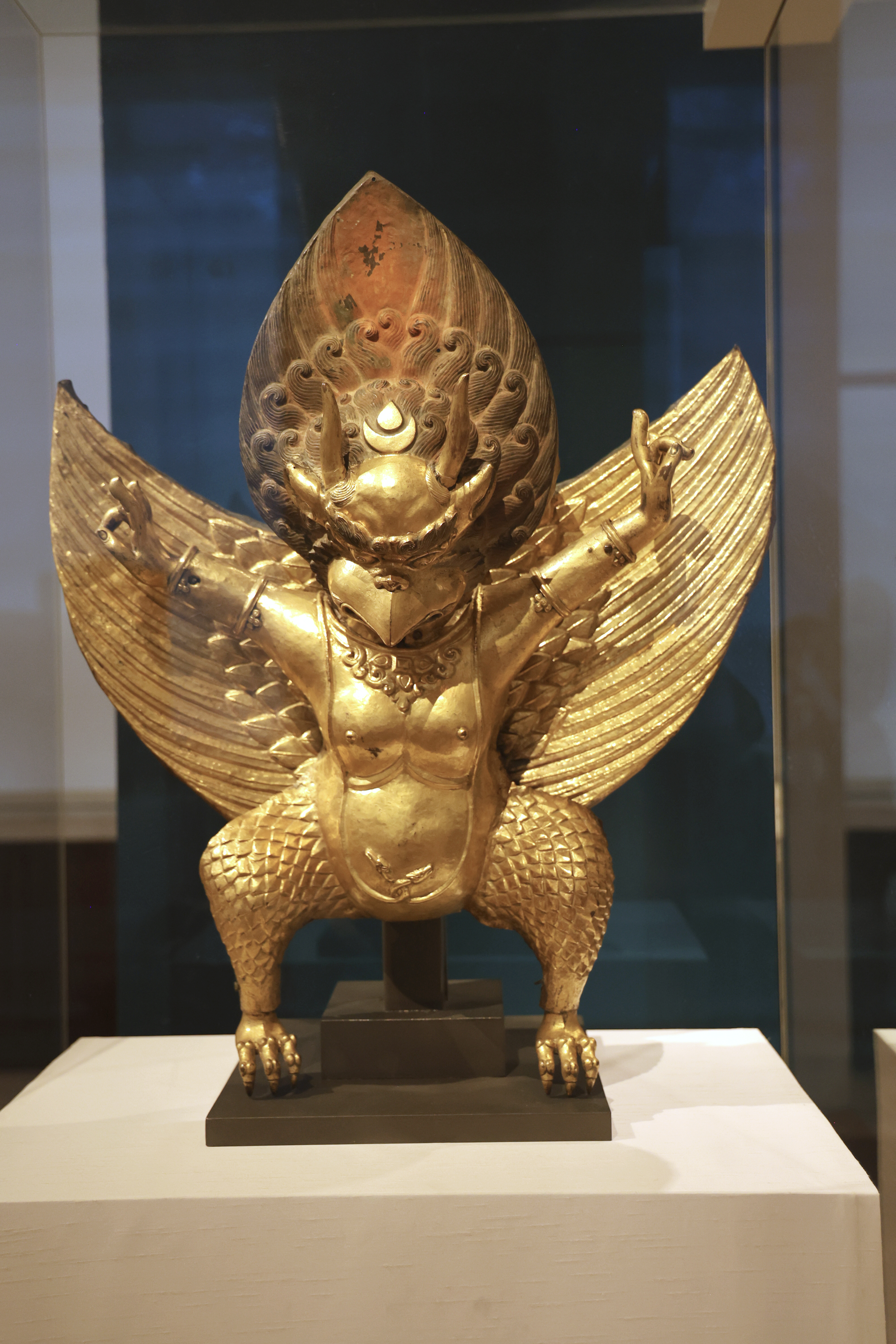
19th century gilt bronze Garuda.

Garuda's links to Vishnu – the Hindu god who fights injustice and destroys evil in his various avatars to preserve dharma – have made him an iconic symbol of kings' duty and power, an insignia of royalty or dharma. His eagle-like form is shown either alone or with Vishnu, signifying divine approval of the power of the state. He is found on the faces of many early Hindu kingdom coins with this symbolism, either as a single-headed bird or a three-headed bird that watches all sides.

Throughout the Mahabharata, Garuda is invoked as a symbol of impetuous violent force, speed, and martial prowess. Powerful warriors advancing rapidly on doomed foes are likened to Garuda swooping down on a serpent. Defeated warriors are like snakes beaten down by Garuda. The Mahabharata character Drona uses a military formation named after Garuda. Krishna carries the image of Garuda on his banner.

=== Temples ===
Though Garuda statues and iconography can be seen in many Vishnu temples, there are very few temples dedicated to Garuda as a deity in India.

==== Vellamassery Garuda Temple, Triprangode, Tirur, Malappuram, Kerala ====
A 1800 year old ancient kavu dedicated to Garuda, it is famous in the state for the alleviation of 'sarpa dosham'. Nearby the main temple is a rare subsidiary shrine dedicated to the Kurma avatar of Lord Vishnu.

==== Chemmanadu Sri Krishna Garuda Mahavishnu Temple, Tiruvaniyoor, Ernakulam, Kerala ====
This temple was believed to have been constructed after Garuda himself manifested in eagle form in front of the devotees during the consecration ceremony. Lord Vishnu is present in his Mohini swaroopam in this temple, adding to its rarity.

== Buddhism ==
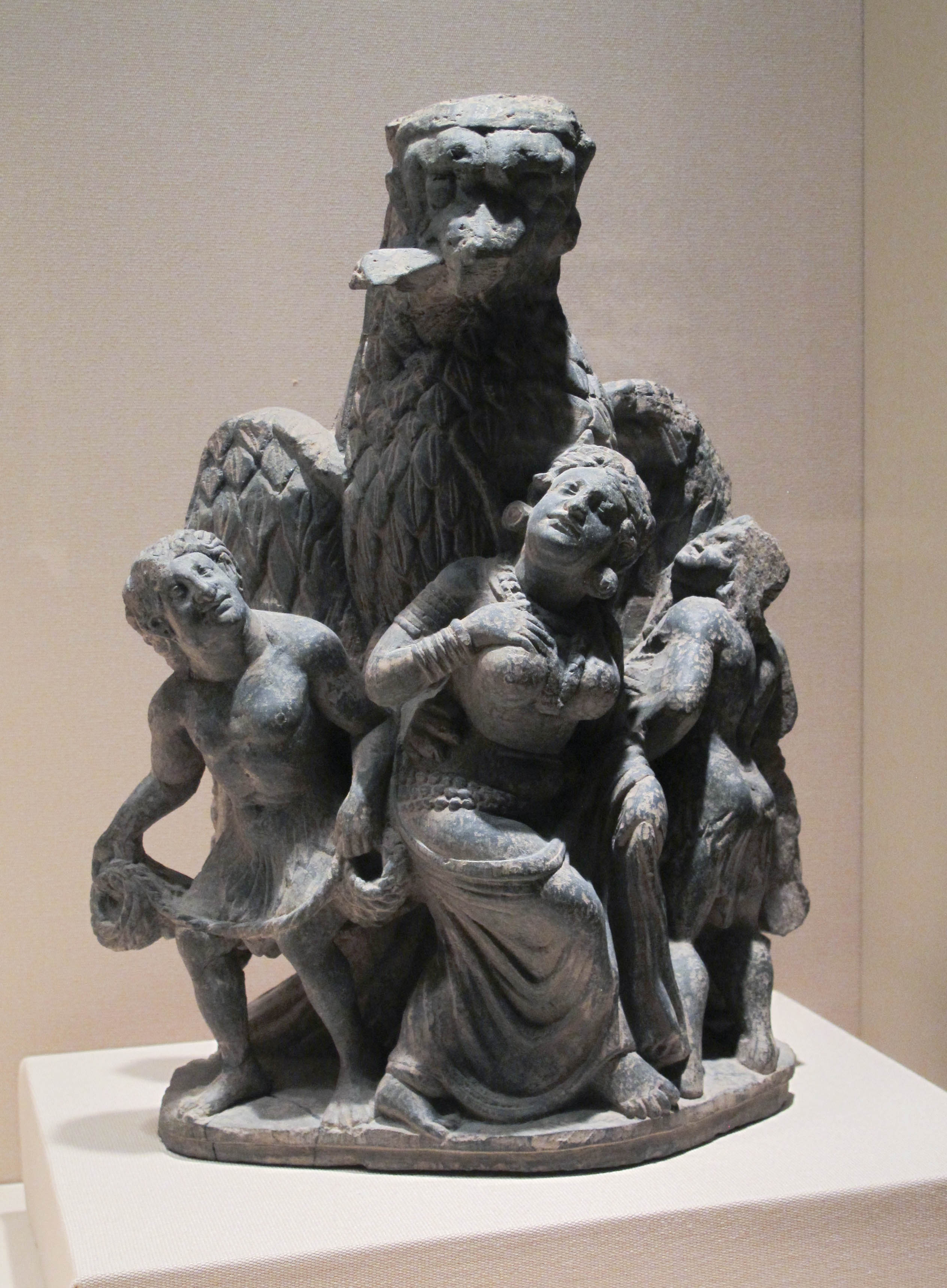
Garuda vanquishing the Naga clan, a Gandhara artwork, second century CE.

Garuda, also referred to as Garula, are golden-winged birds in Buddhist texts. Under the Buddhist concept of saṃsāra, they are one of the Aṣṭagatyaḥ, the eight classes of inhuman beings. In Buddhist art, they are shown as sitting and listening to the sermons of the Buddha. They are enemies of the Nāgas (snakes) and are sometimes depicted with a serpent held between their claws. Like the Hindu art, both zoomorphic (giant eagle-like bird) and partially anthropomorphic (part bird, part human) iconography is common across Buddhist traditions.

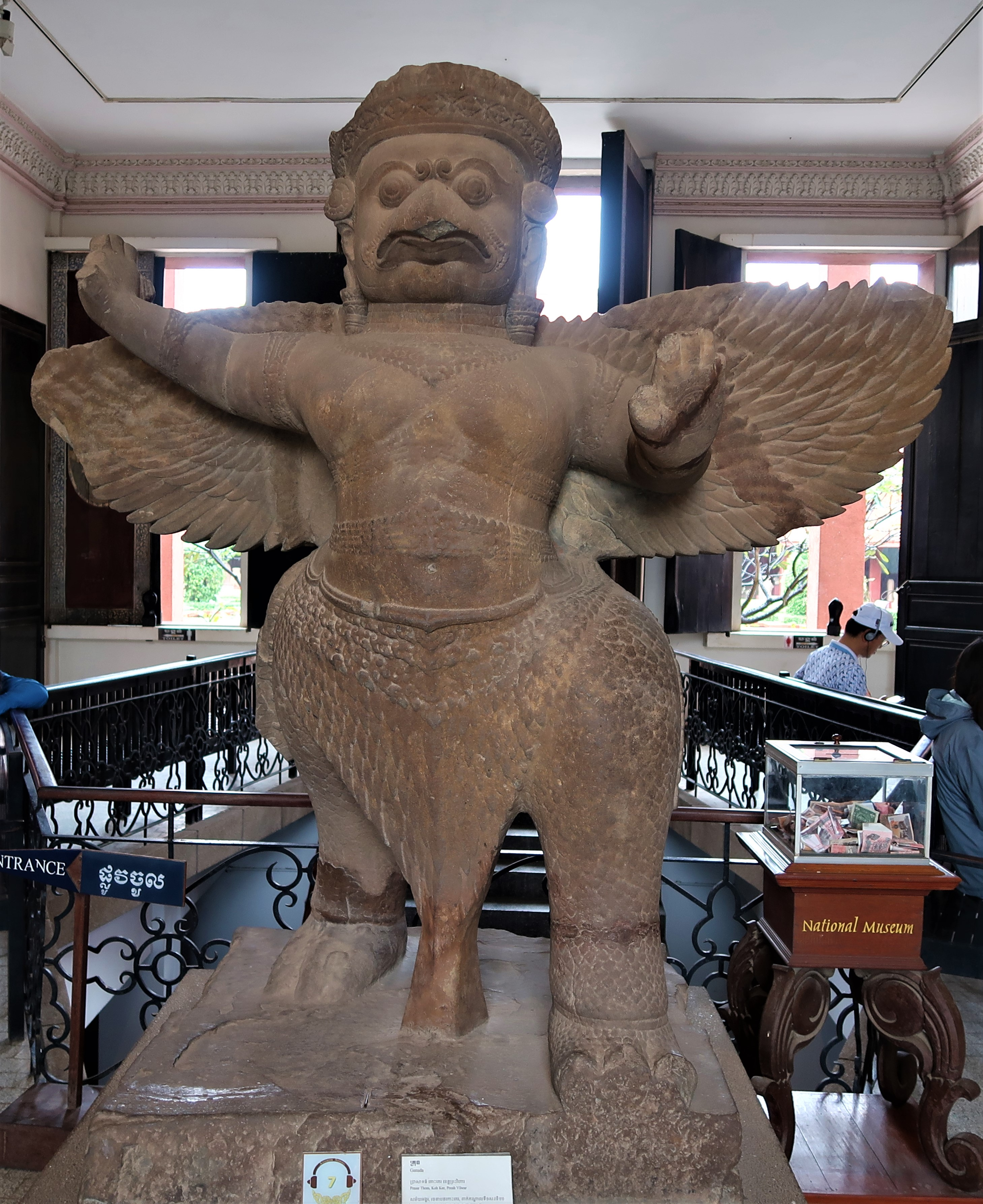
Garuda (Khmer: គ្រុឌ, Krŭd) in Koh Ker style. Made of sandstone, this statue is from the first half of tenth century, (Angkor period). On display at the National Museum of Cambodia.

In Buddhism, the Garuda (Sanskrit; Pāli: garuḷā) are enormous predatory birds with a wingspan of 330 yojanas. They are described as beings with intelligence and social organisation. They are also sometimes known as suparṇa (Sanskrit; Pāli: supaṇṇa), meaning "well-winged, having good wings". Like the Nāgas, they combine the characteristics of animals and divine beings, and may be considered to be among the lowest of the devas. The Garudas have kings and cities, and at least some of them have the magical power of changing into human form when they wish to have dealings with people. On some occasions Garuda kings have had romances with human women in this form. Their dwellings are in groves of the simbalī, or silk-cotton tree.

Jataka stories describe them to be residents of Nagadipa or Seruma.

The Garuda are enemies to the nāga, a race of intelligent serpent-like beings or dragon-like beings, whom they hunt. The Garudas at one time caught the nāgas by seizing them by their heads; but the nāgas learned that by swallowing large stones, they could make themselves too heavy to be carried by the Garudas, wearing them out and killing them from exhaustion. This secret was divulged to one of the Garudas by the ascetic Karambiya, who taught him how to seize a nāga by the tail and force him to vomit up his stone (Pandara Jātaka, J.518).

The Garudas were among the beings appointed by Śakra to guard Mount Sumeru and the Trāyastriṃśa heaven from the attacks of the asuras.

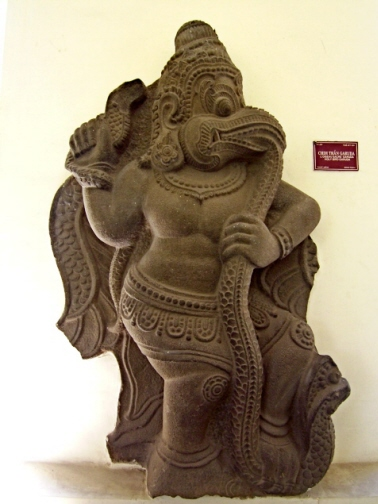
13th century Cham sculpture depicts Garuda devouring a nāga serpent.

In the Maha-samaya Sutta (Digha Nikaya 20), the Buddha is shown making temporary peace between the Nagas and the Garudas.

In the Qing dynasty fiction The Story of Yue Fei (1684), Garuda sits at the head of the Buddha's throne. But when a celestial bat (an embodiment of the Aquarius constellation) flatulates during the Buddha's expounding of the Lotus Sutra, Garuda kills her and is exiled from paradise. He is later reborn as Song dynasty General Yue Fei. The bat is reborn as Lady Wang, wife of the traitor Prime Minister Qin Hui, and is instrumental in formulating the "Eastern Window" plot that leads to Yue's eventual political execution. The Story of Yue Fei plays on the legendary animosity between Garuda and the Nagas when the celestial bird-born Yue Fei defeats a magic serpent who transforms into the unearthly spear he uses throughout his military career. Literary critic C. T. Hsia explains the reason why Qian Cai, the book's author, linked Yue with Garuda is because of the homology in their Chinese names. Yue Fei's courtesy name is Pengju (鵬舉). A Peng (鵬) is a giant mythological bird likened to the Middle Eastern roc. Garuda's Chinese name is Great Peng, the Golden-Winged Illumination King (大鵬金翅明王).

== Jainism ==
The Garuda is a yaksha or guardian for Shantinatha in Jain iconography and mythology. Jain iconography shows Garuda as a human figure with wings and a strand-circle.

== As a cultural and national symbol ==
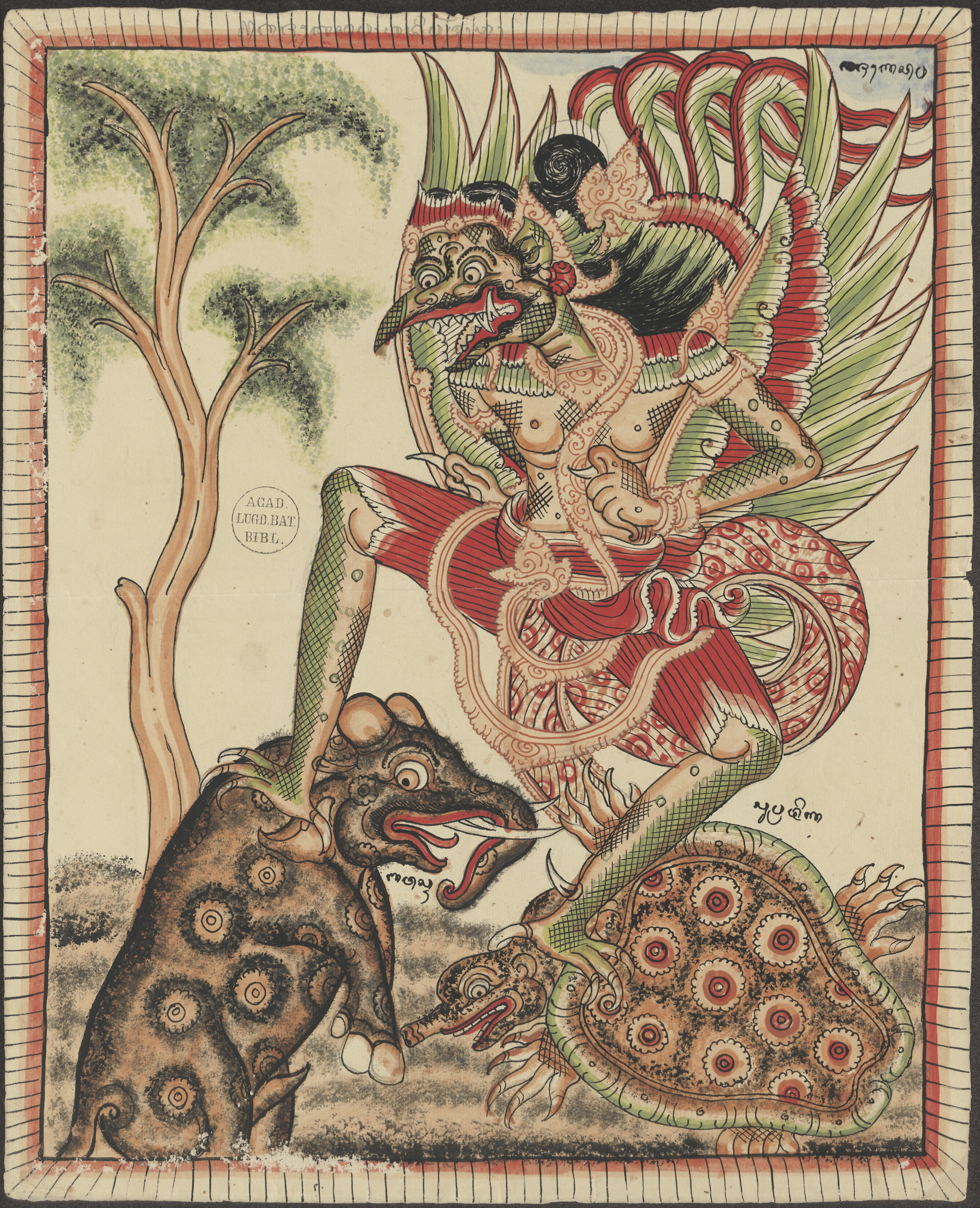
Garuda according to Ida Made Tlaga, a 19th-century Balinese artist.

In India and the rest of Southeast Asia the eagle symbolism is represented by Garuda, a large bird with eagle-like features that appears in both Hindu and Buddhist epic as the vahana (vehicle) of the god Vishnu. Garuda became the national emblem of Thailand and Indonesia; Thailand's Garuda is rendered in a more traditional anthropomorphic style, while that of Indonesia is rendered in heraldic style with traits similar to the real Javan hawk-eagle.

=== Cambodia ===
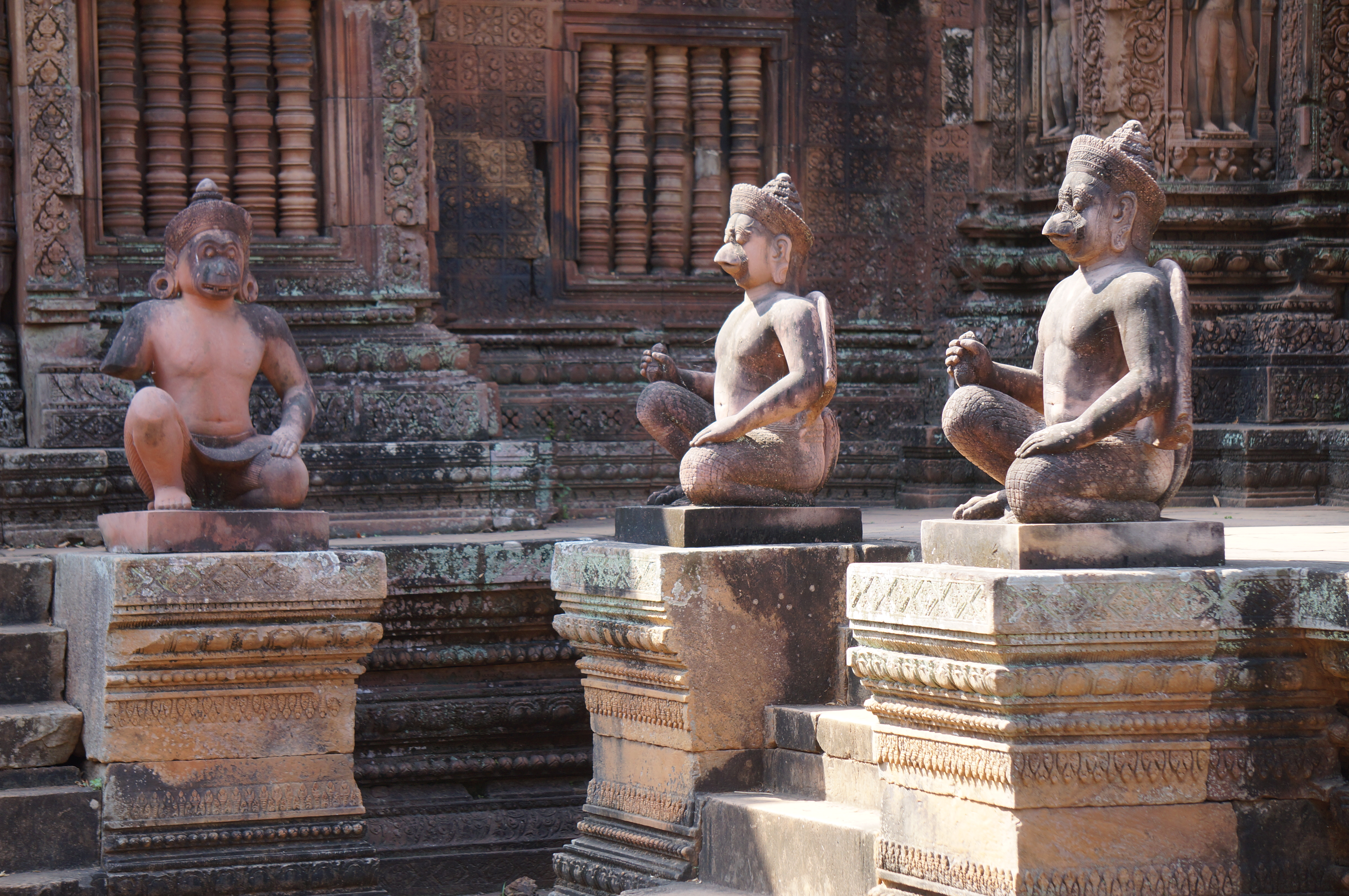
Garuda guardian sculptures (two on right side), Banteay Srei temple, Cambodia.

The word Garuda (Khmer: គ្រុឌ – " Krud ") is literally derived from Sanskrit.

- In Cambodian architecture, sculptures of Garuda have been used as decorative elements on temples, viharas, and elite residences since the Khmer Empire. They continue to be used today.
- Garuda is also mentioned in many legendary tales as the vehicle of Vishnu and its main rival is the race of the Nagas.

=== China ===
- In China, Garuda (Chinese: 迦楼羅 Jiālóuluó) is considered one of the Eight Legions of Devas and Nāgas. Another Chinese name for Garuda is Great Peng, the Golden-Winged Illumination King (大鵬金翅明王)
- In some temples in the Central Plains, Garuda is also considered to be a manifestation of Avalokitesvara, the Bodhisattva Guanyin.

=== India ===
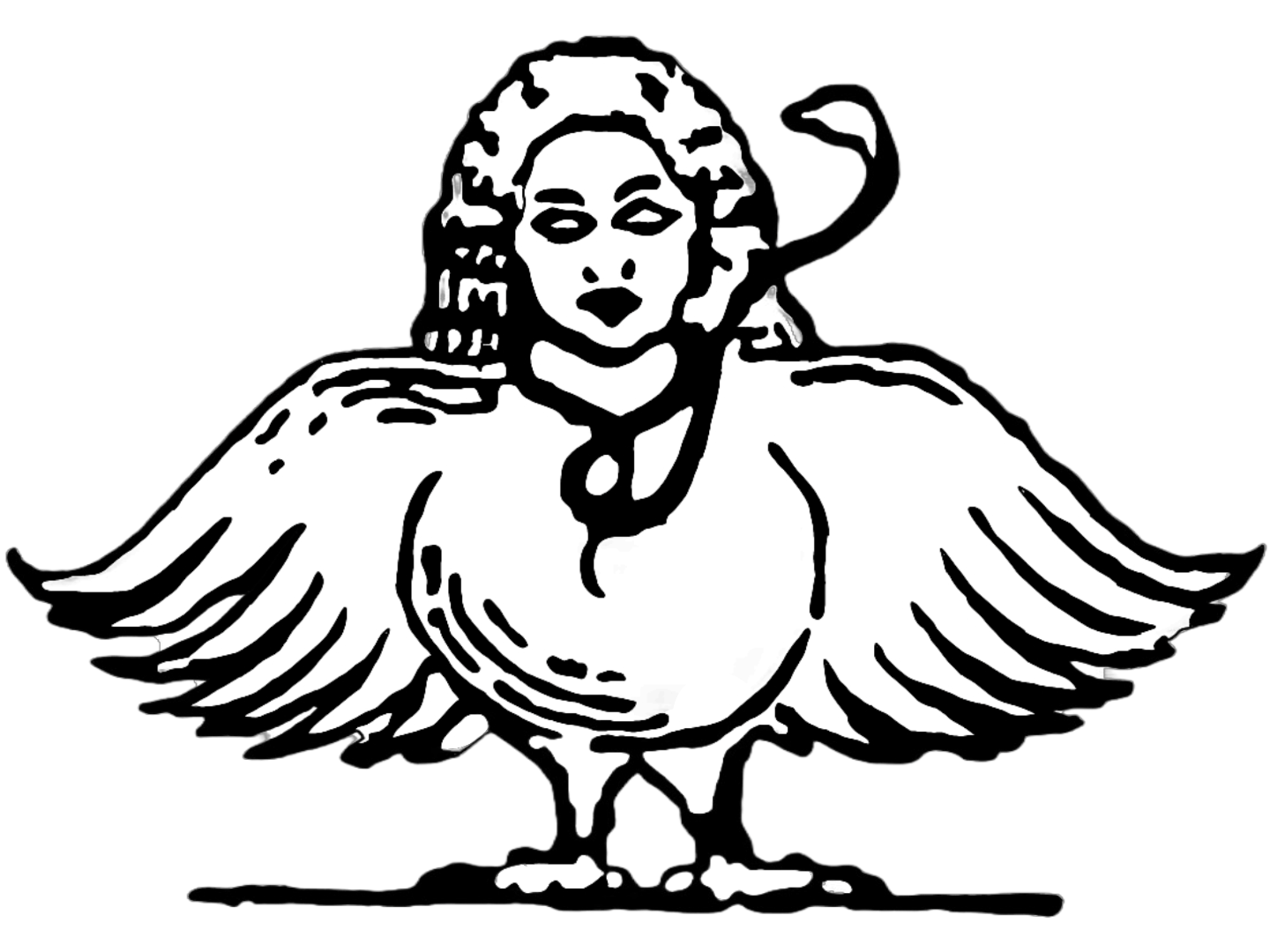
Garuda emblem of the Gupta Empire.

India primarily uses Garuda as a martial motif:

- Royal insignia (Garudadhvaja) of the Gupta Empire.
- Garud Commando Force is a special forces unit of the Indian Air Force, specialising in operations deep behind enemy lines.
- Brigade of the Guards of the Indian Army uses Garuda as their symbol.
- The Institute of Chartered Accountants of India (ICAI) uses Garuda as their logo.
- Elite bodyguards of the medieval Hoysala kings were called Garudas.
- Kerala and Andhra Pradesh state road transport corporations use Garuda as the name for a/c mofussil buses.
- Garuda rock, a rocky cliff in Tirumala in Andhra Pradesh.
- The insignia of the 13th century Aragalur chief, Magadesan, included Rishabha the sacred bull and the Garuda.
- Indian Hindi-language TV serial Dharm Yoddha Garud, based on the life of Garuda.

As an art form

- Garudan Thookam, a temple dance primarily found in Central Kerala districts, where dancers dress as Garuda, and dance in praise of Goddess Kali.

=== Indonesia ===
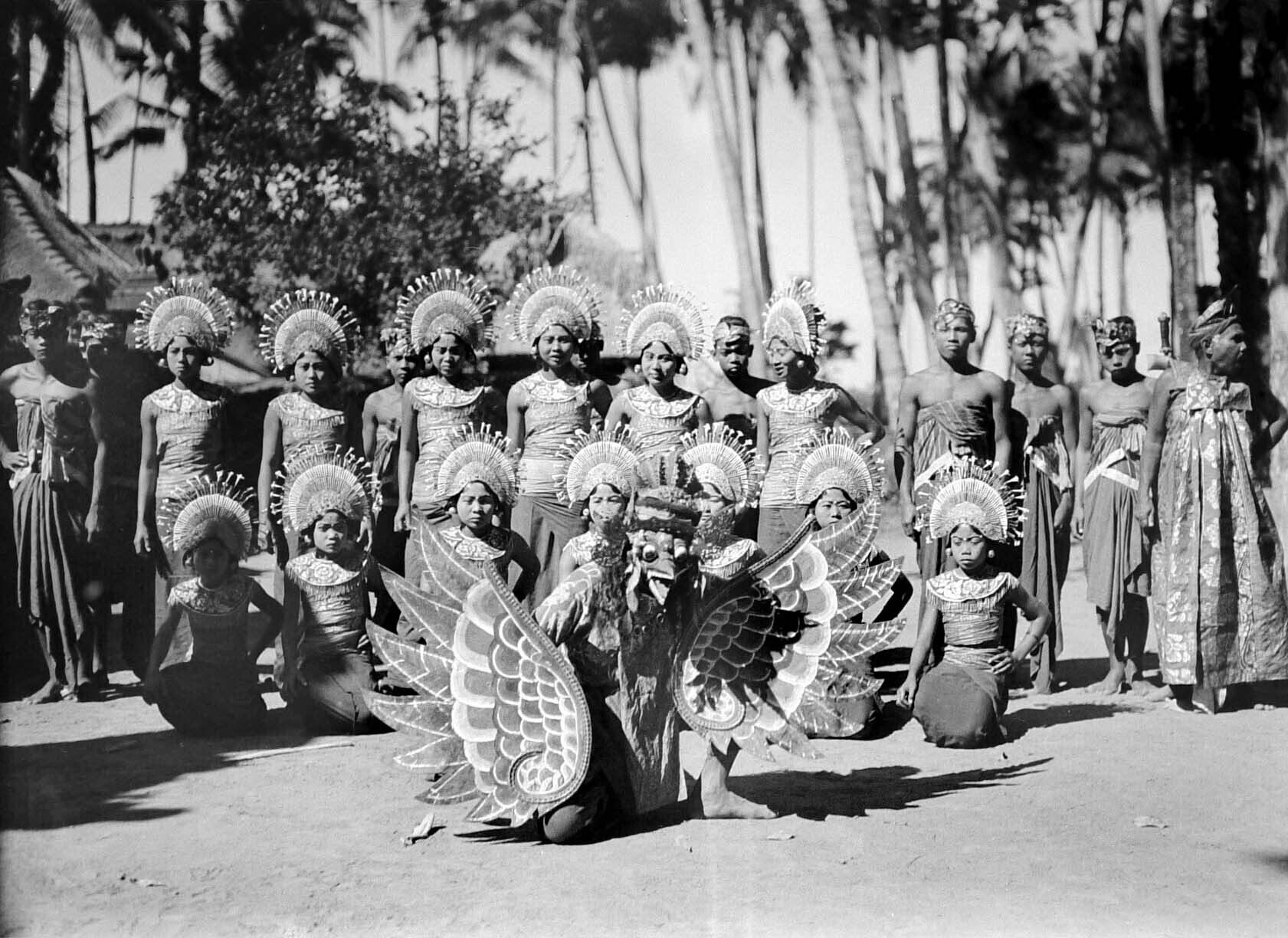
Balinese dancers including a man dressed as Garuda (1935).

The national emblem of Indonesia, which uses a Garuda.

Indonesia uses the Garuda in a form called the Garuda Pancasila as its national symbol. The Garuda Pancasila is coloured black or gilded, symbolising both the greatness of the nation and the elang Jawa (Javan hawk-eagle Nisaetus bartelsi). The black colour represents nature. There are 17 feathers on each wing, 8 feathers on the lower tail, 19 feathers on the upper tail, and 45 feathers on the neck, which together represent "17/8/1945" or 17 August 1945, the date when Indonesia proclaimed its independence. The shield it carries bears the motto Panca Sila, which symbolises self-defense and protection in struggle.

- Garuda Indonesia - national airline of Indonesia
- Garuda Contingent - peacekeeping force of the Indonesian National Armed Forces
- Airlangga University, one of the oldest and leading university in Indonesia uses Garuda on its emblem. The emblem, containing a Garuda in a blue and yellow circle, is called "Garudamukha", and depicts Garuda as the bearer of knowledge, carrying a jug of Amrita, the water of eternity, symbolising eternal knowledge.
- In Bali and Java, the Garuda has become a cultural symbol. The wooden statue and mask of Garuda is a popular feature in artworks and souvenirs.
  - The tallest Garuda statue, made of copper and brass standing 75 metres (246.1 ft) tall (or 122 metres tall including the pedestal), is located in Garuda Wisnu Kencana complex in Bali.
- The stylised brush stroke that resembles Garuda appears in the logo of 2011 Southeast Asian Games, held in Palembang and Jakarta, Indonesia.
- The stylised curves that took the form of Garuda Pancasila appears in the logo of Wonderful Indonesia tourism campaign.

=== Japan ===
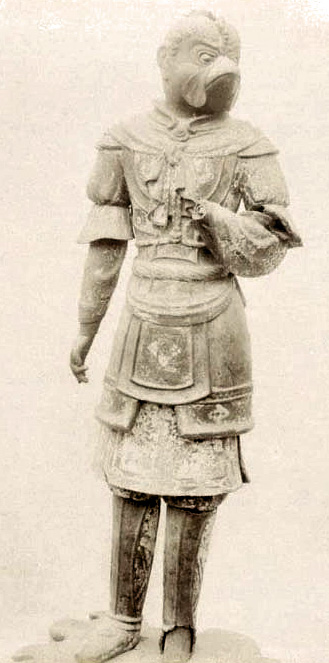
Wingless statue of Garuda or Karura in Kofukuji Temple, Nara, Japan, eighth century.

- The Karura (迦楼羅) is a divine creature with human torso and birdlike head in Japanese iterations of Hindu-Buddhist epics.
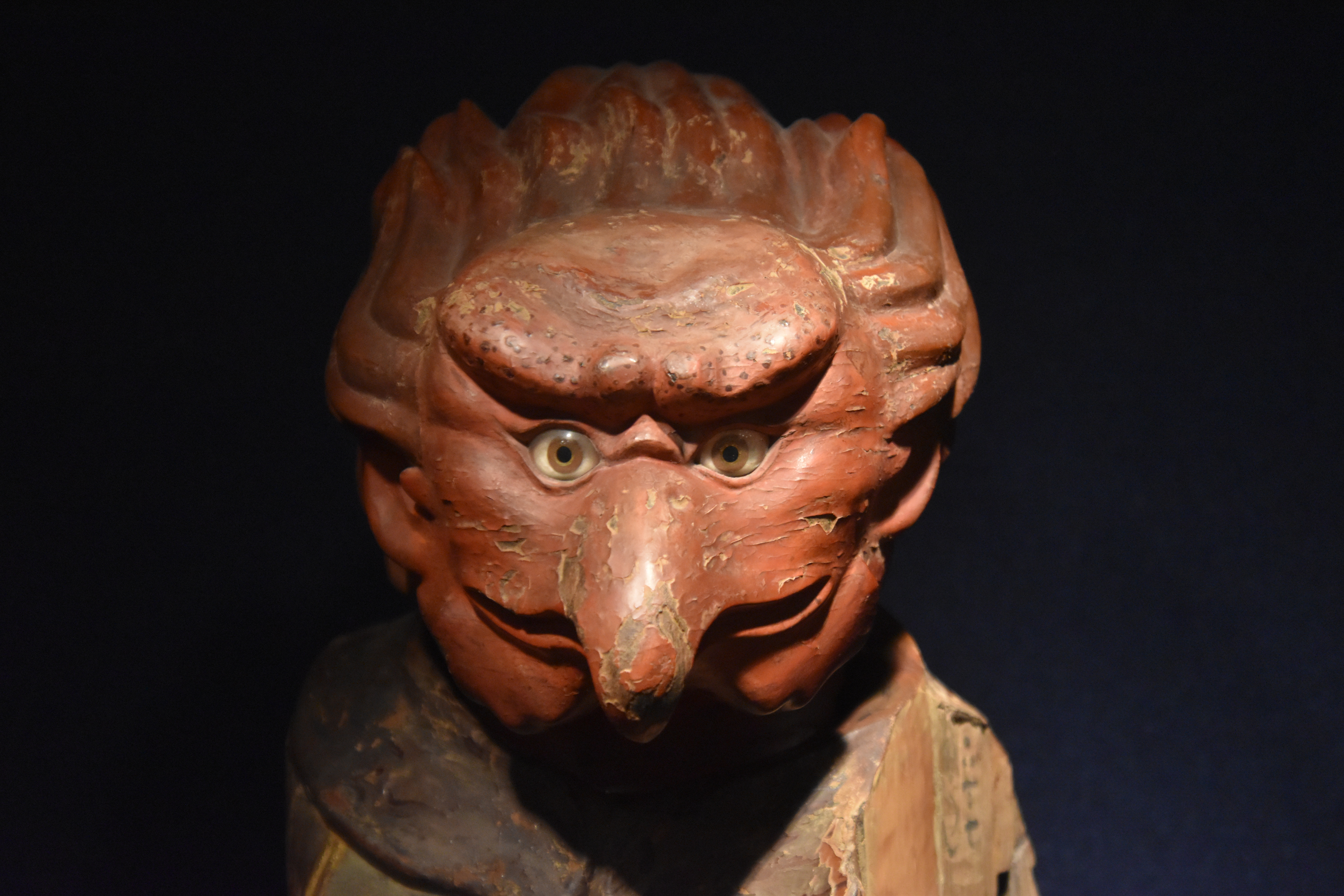
- Karura (Garuda) as an avatar of the goddess Kannon, fifteenth century.
  The name is a transliteration of Garuda (Sanskrit: Garuḍa गरुड; Pāli: Garuḷa) a race of enormously gigantic birds in Hinduism, upon which the Japanese Buddhist version is based. The same creature may go by the name of konjichō (金翅鳥, lit. "gold-winged bird", Skr. suparṇa).

=== Malaysia ===
In the northern Peninsular state of Kelantan, the Geroda (Jawi: ݢرودا) often appears in stories of Wayang Kulit Kelantan as well as becoming the main motif of Burung Petala Indera boat-chariot made for special royal processions in the early 20th century.

=== Mongolia ===
- The Garuda, known as Khangarid, is the symbol of Ulaanbaatar, the capital of Mongolia. According to popular Mongolian belief, Khangarid is the mountain spirit of the Bogd Khan Uul range who became a follower of Buddhist faith. Today he is considered the guardian of that mountain range and a symbol of courage and honesty.
- Khangarid (Хангарьд), a football (soccer) team in the Mongolia Premier League also named after Garuda.
- State Garuda (Улсын Гарьд) is a title given to the debut runner up in wrestling tournament during Mongolian National Festival Naadam.

=== Myanmar ===
- In Burmese epics, which was influenced by Hindu-Buddhist beliefs, Garuda is known as Galone, the nemesis of the Nāgas.
- The Garuda symbolises Sunday in the Burmese zodiac, which is based on the days of the week.
- Saya San adopted the symbol of the Garuda in his rebellion against the British, who were symbolised by the Nāgas.

=== Nepal ===
- Garuda is found in Nepalese traditions of Hinduism and Buddhism.
- The first sounding rocket of Nepal is named Garuda.
- The central bank, Nepal Rastra Bank uses Garuda in their official logo.
- Ancient palaces in Kathmandu Valley use statues of Garuda at their gates.

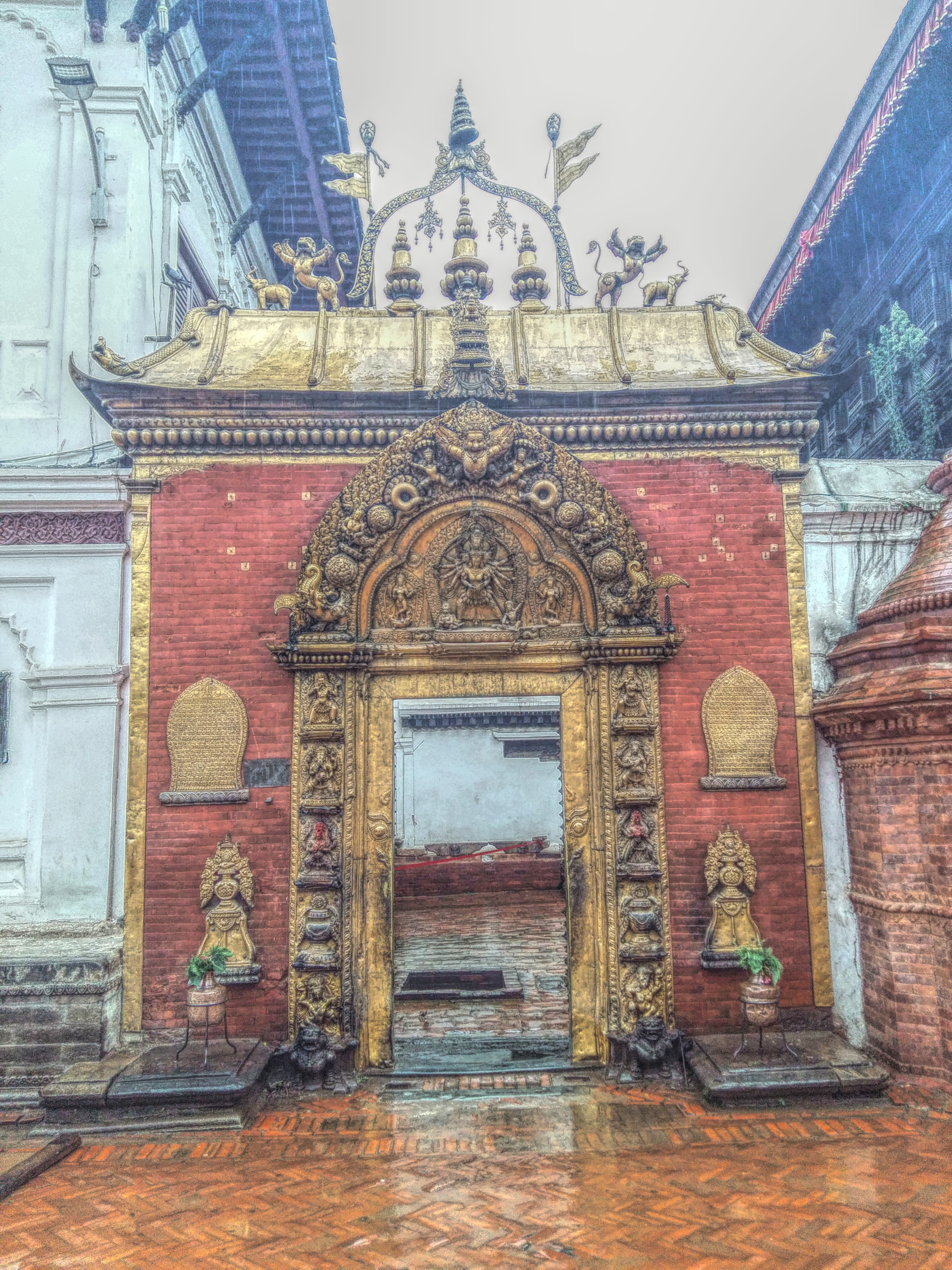
Sun Dhoka Golden Gate with the Goddess Taleju Bhawani and Garuda, leading to the Royal Palace, Durbar Square, UNESCO World Heritage Site, Bhaktapur, Nepal.

=== Philippines ===
- in Luzon Mythology, Garuda or Galurâ (in Kapampangan) is a winged assistant of Apúng Sinukuan (Mariang Sinukuan), he is represented by a giant eagle and believed to be the bringer of storms.
- The Maranao people of southern Philippines believe in a race of creatures called garuda who dwell beneath the sea. These beings are winged, have big teeth, and huge talons that can carry six men. They look like eagles when flying in the sky but transform into humans when in their lairs.
- Artifacts from the Tabon Caves in the island of Palawan, is an image of Garuda, the bird who is the mount of Vishnu. The discovery of sophisticated Hindu imagery in gold.

=== Suriname ===
- In Suriname, there is a radio and TV station called Radio en Televisie Garuda, which broadcasts programming from Indonesia, particularly Java, aimed at the Javanese Surinamese population.

=== Thailand ===
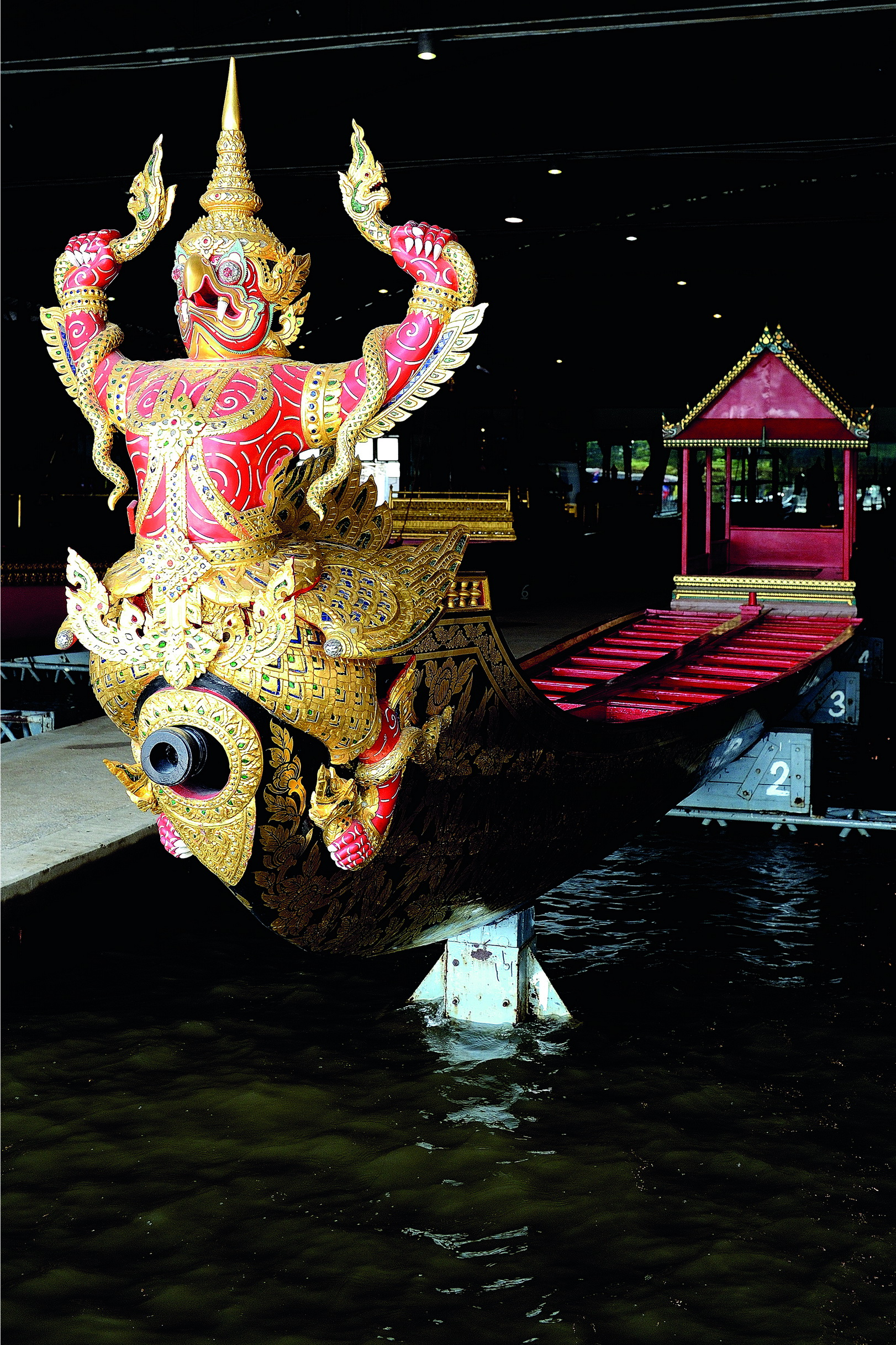
Garuda as the masthead of Thai royal barge.

Thailand uses the Garuda (Thai: ครุฑ, khrut) as its national symbol, known as the Phra Khrut Pha, meaning "Garuda, the vehicle (of Vishnu)," also used as the symbol of royalty. It adorns the banknote of their currency - the Baht - as well.

- Almost all official documents issued by the government or monarchy bear the Garuda at the top, from royal commandments to land deeds and court orders. The Kingdom of Siam has had an image of Garuda in its coins since at least the Ayutthaya era.
- Statues and images of Garuda adorn many Buddhist temples in Thailand. It also has become a cultural symbol of Thailand.
- The figure of Garuda is also installed as the figurehead or masthead of Thai royal barges.

=== United States ===

The Electronic Attack Squadron 134 (VAQ-134) of the United States Navy is named after and uses the Garuda Insignia.

== Gallery ==
Insignia

Garuda as the badge of Brigade of the Guards of India

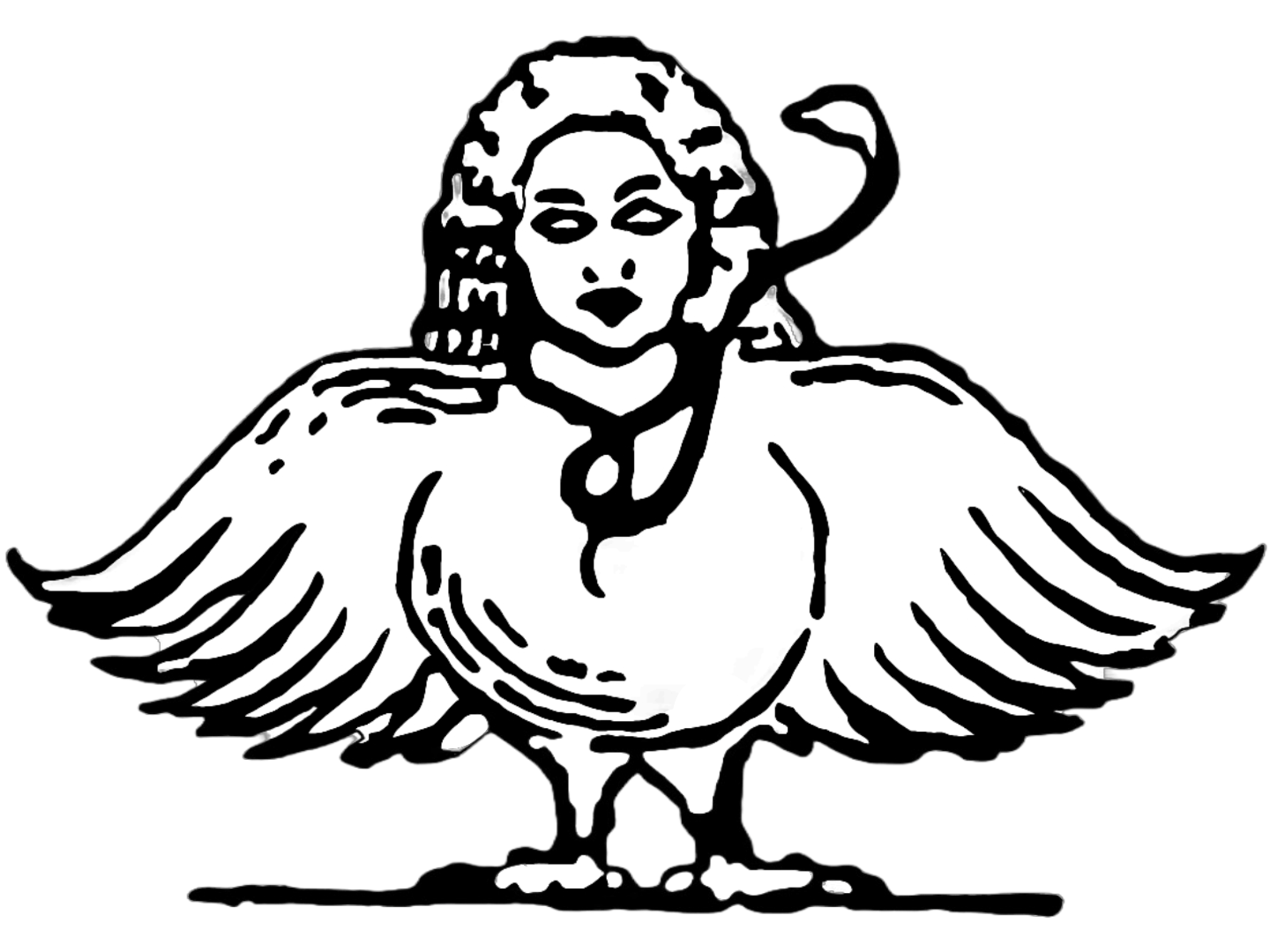
Garuda emblem of the Gupta Empire.

Garuda as national symbol of Indonesia

Garuda as national symbol of Thailand

Garuda (Khangardi) as the symbol of Ulaanbaatar, Mongolia

Coins

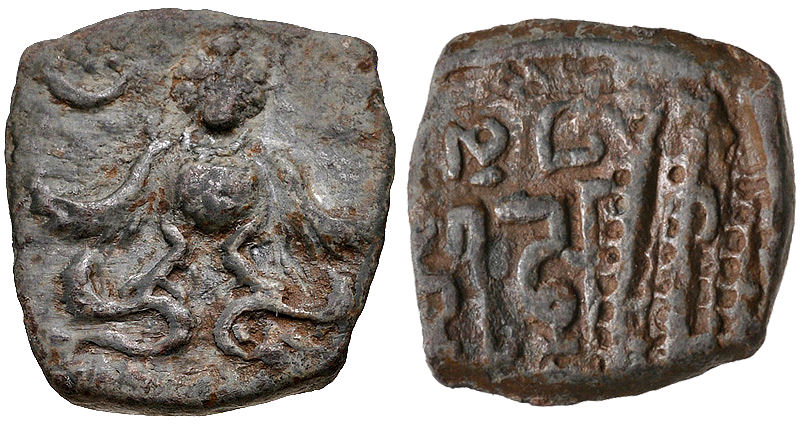
5th-century Gupta-era coin, Garuda with snakes in his claws

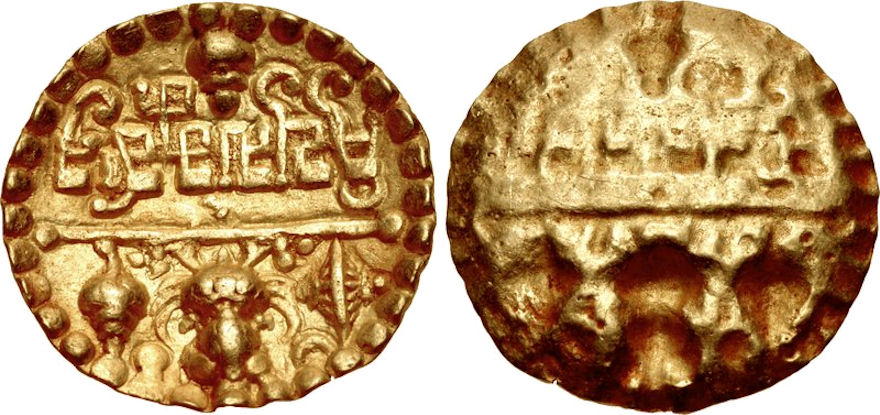
6th century coin with Garuda and Vishnu's chakra and conch on side

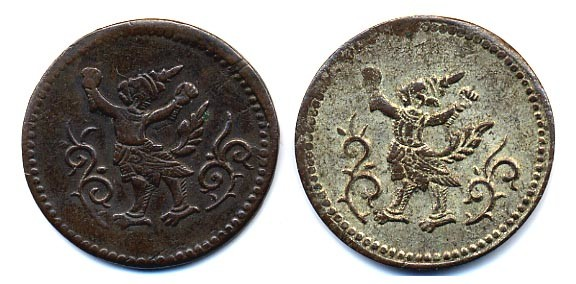
A Cambodian coin during French Protection period 1853

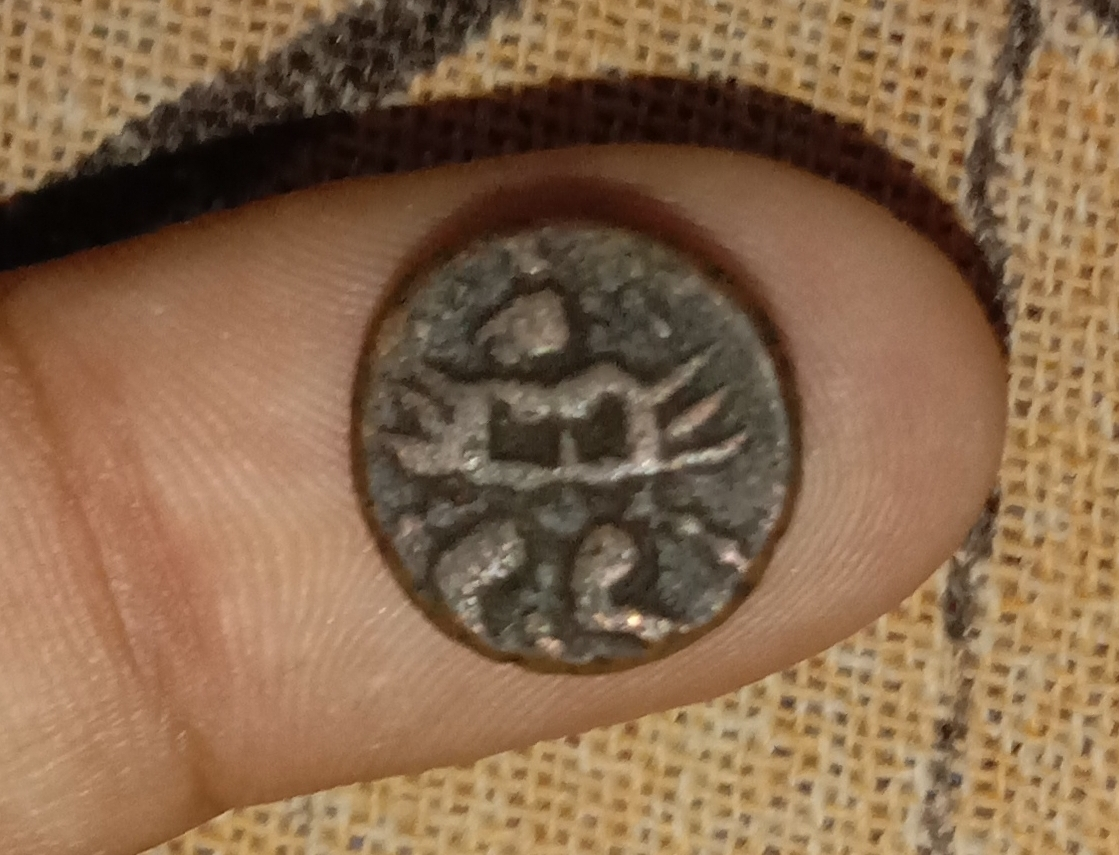
Copper Jital coin of the Vijayanagara Empire, struck during the reign of Krishnadevaraya, having the Garuda motif on obverse

Temples

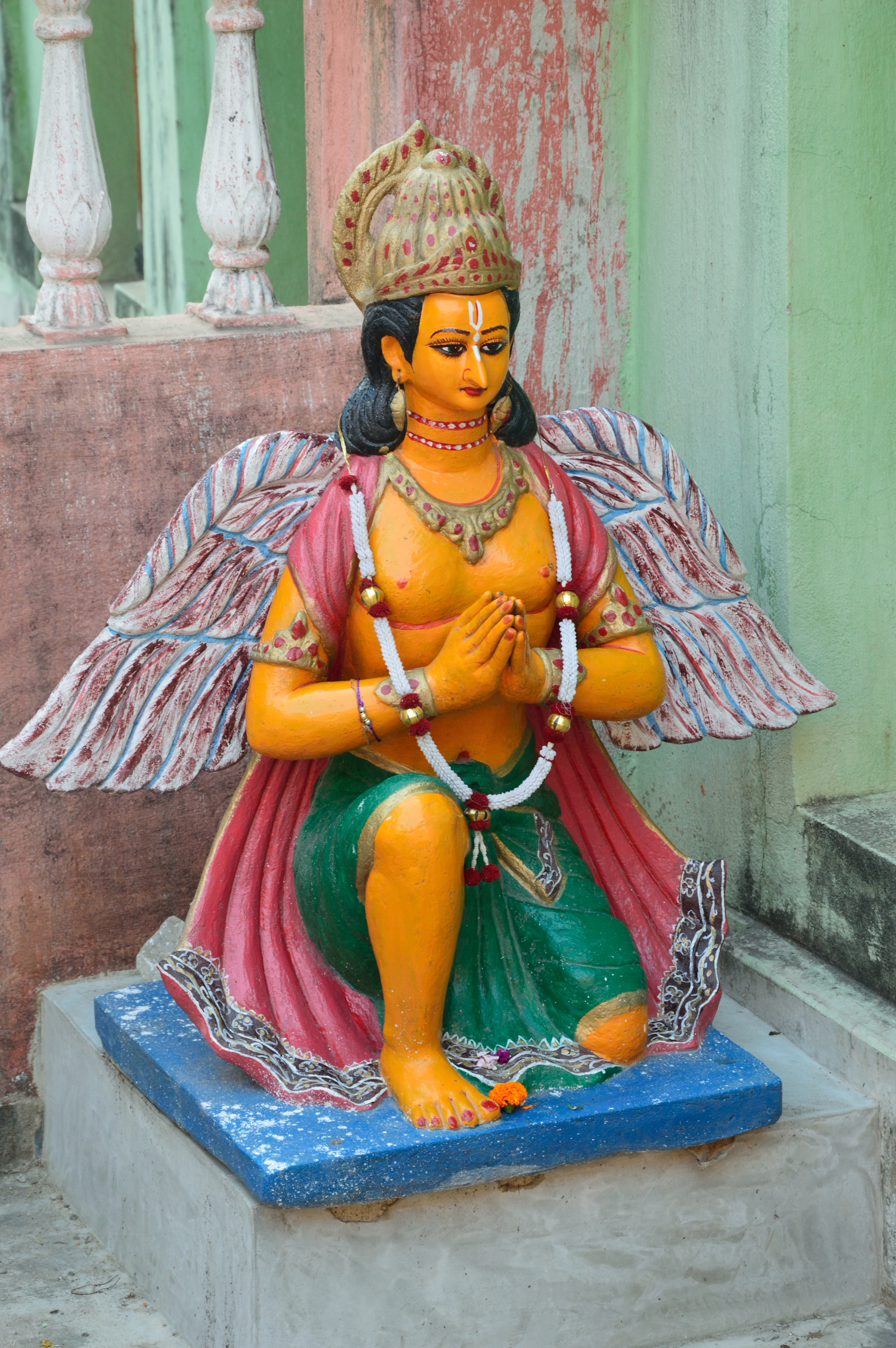
Garuda iconography at a Radha Krishna Temple in Kolkata.

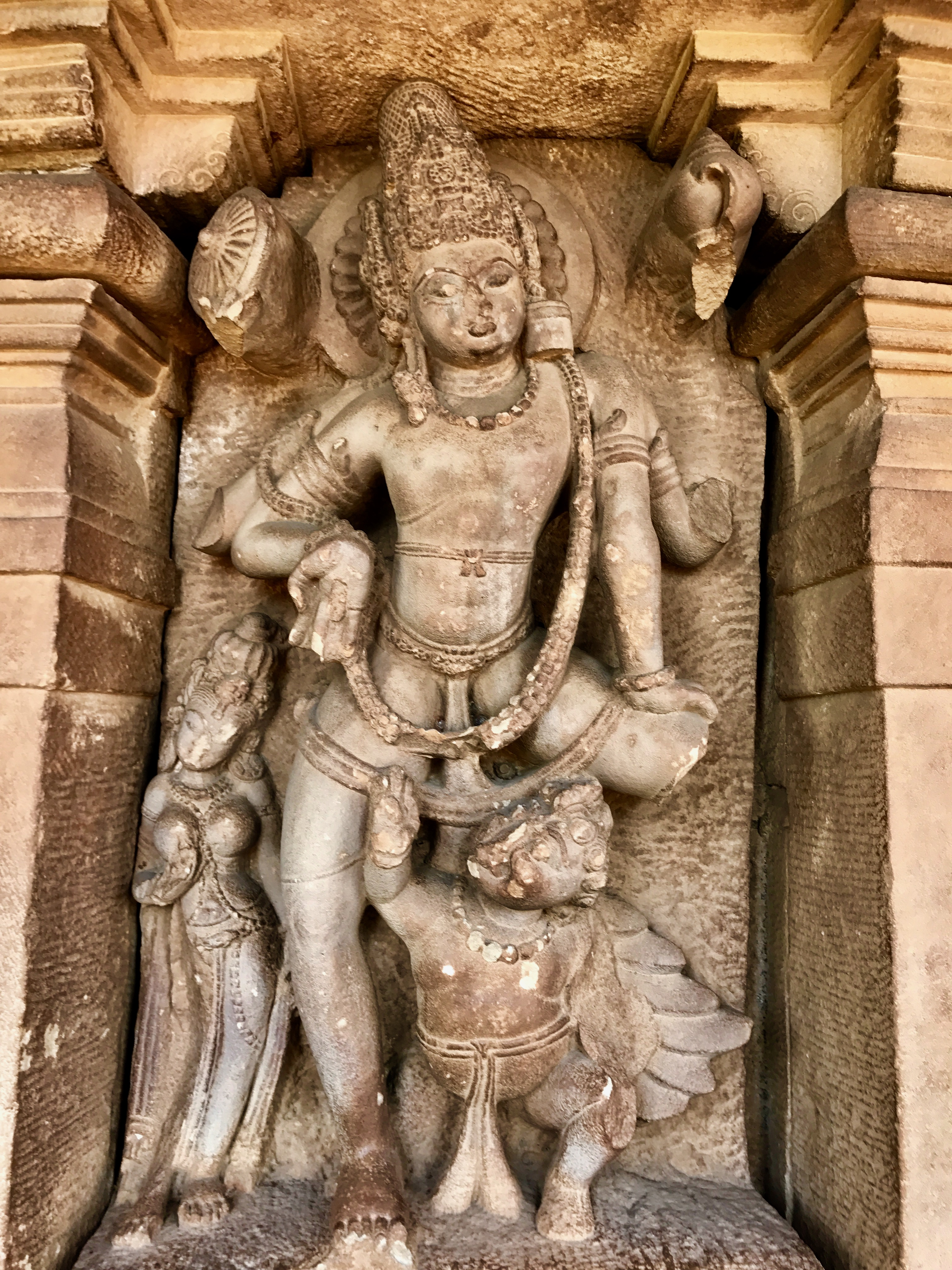
8th century Garuda carrying Vishnu in Aihole, Karnataka, India

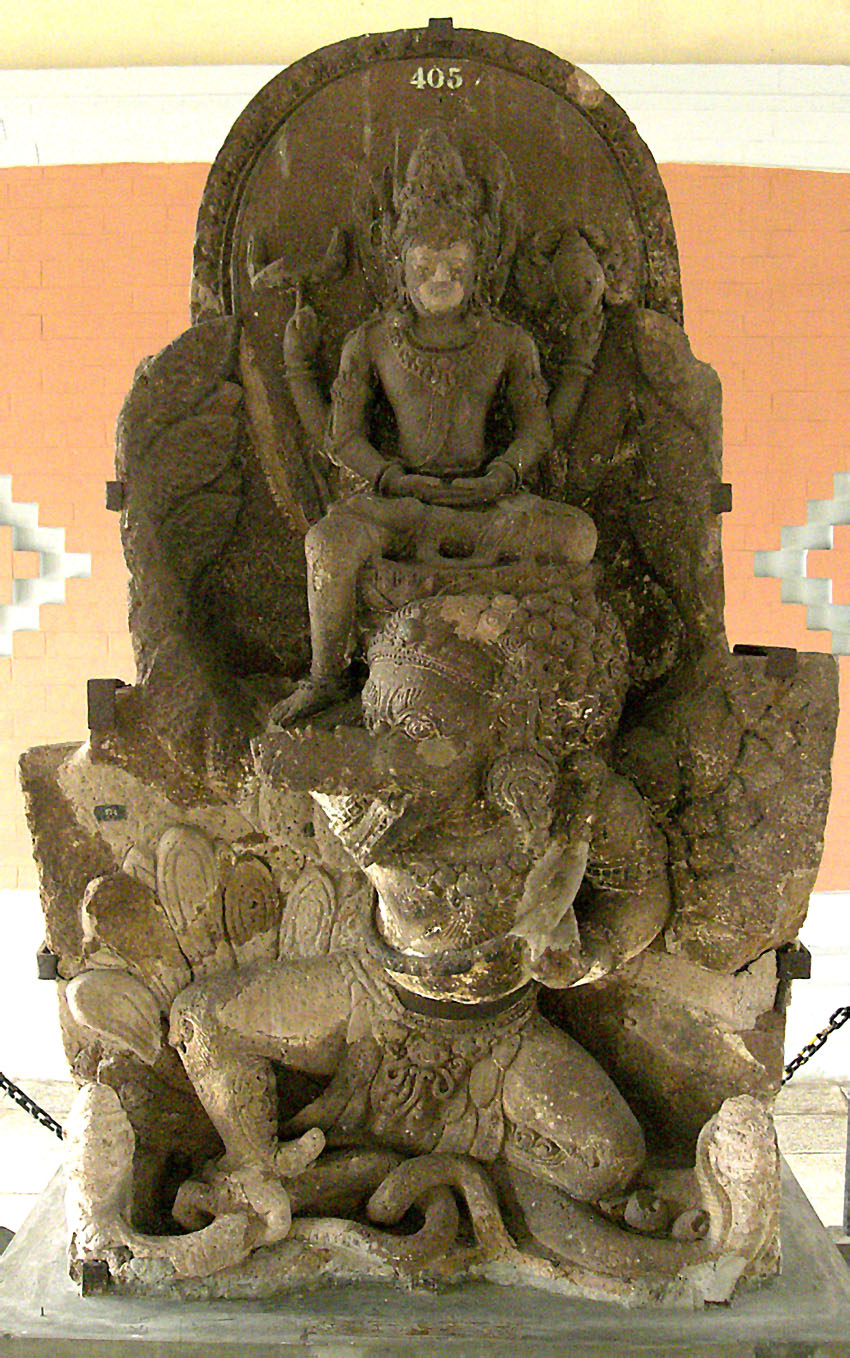
King Airlangga depicted as Vishnu mounting Garuda, 11th century East Java, Indonesia

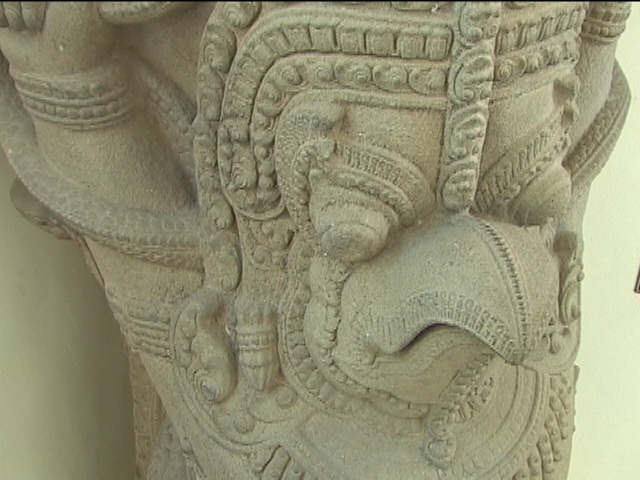
12th century Cham sculpture, Viet Nam, in the Thap Mam style depicts Garuda serving as an atlas

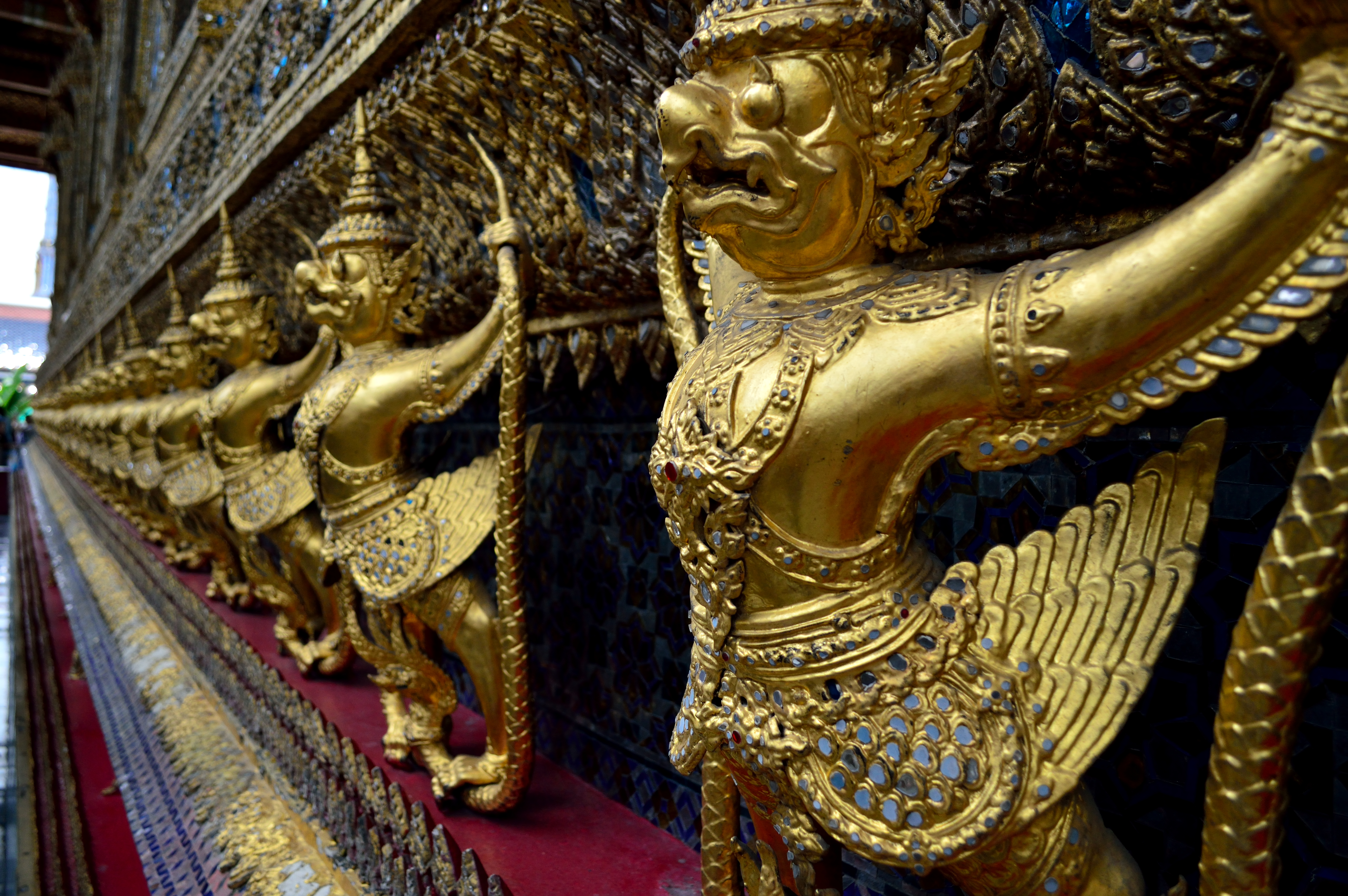
The statues of Krut battling naga serpent, a Thai Buddhist adaptation of Garuda in Wat Phra Kaeo temple, Thailand.

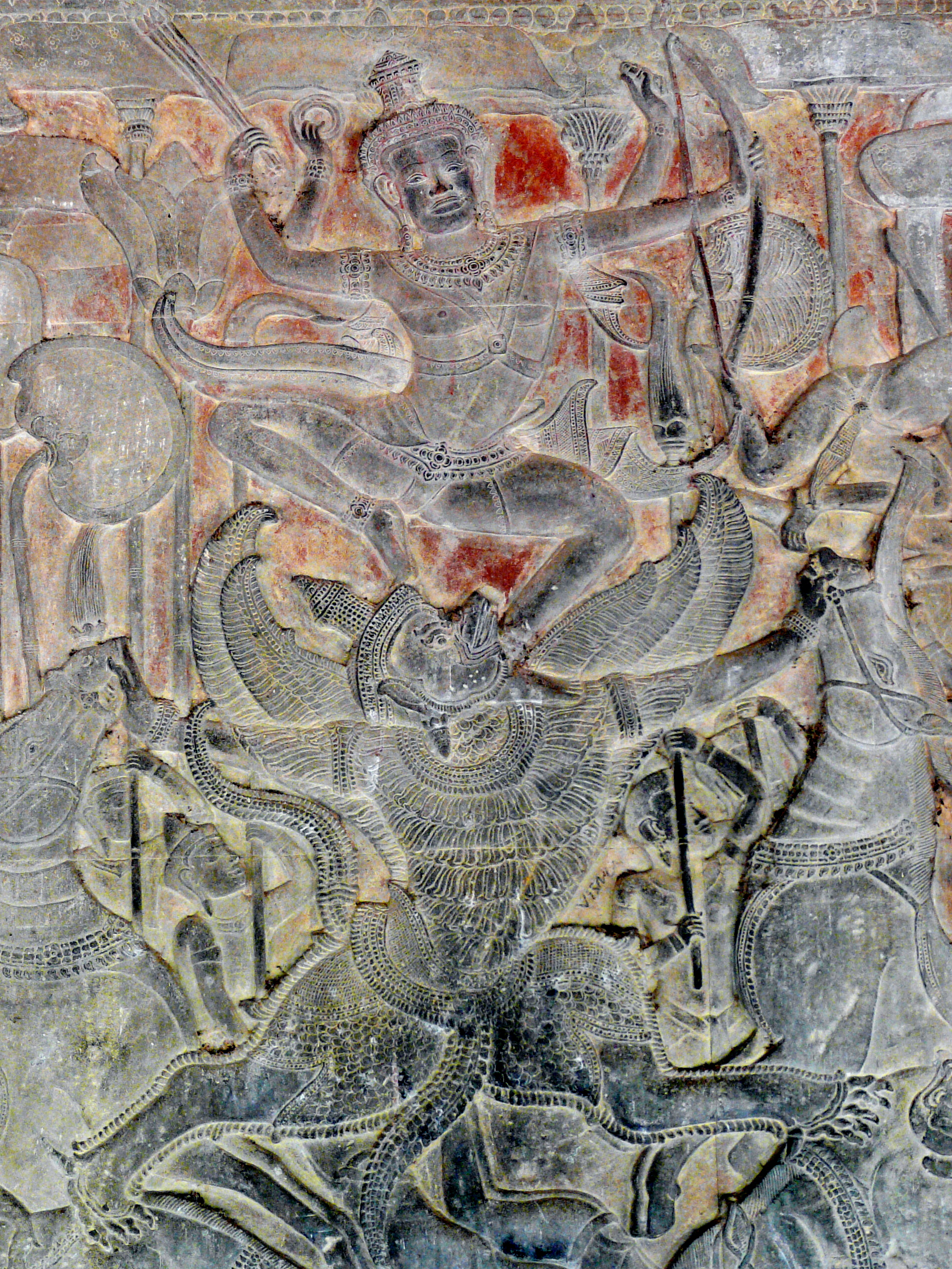
12th century bas relief at Angkor Wat in Cambodia showing Vishnu in battle mounted on Garuda

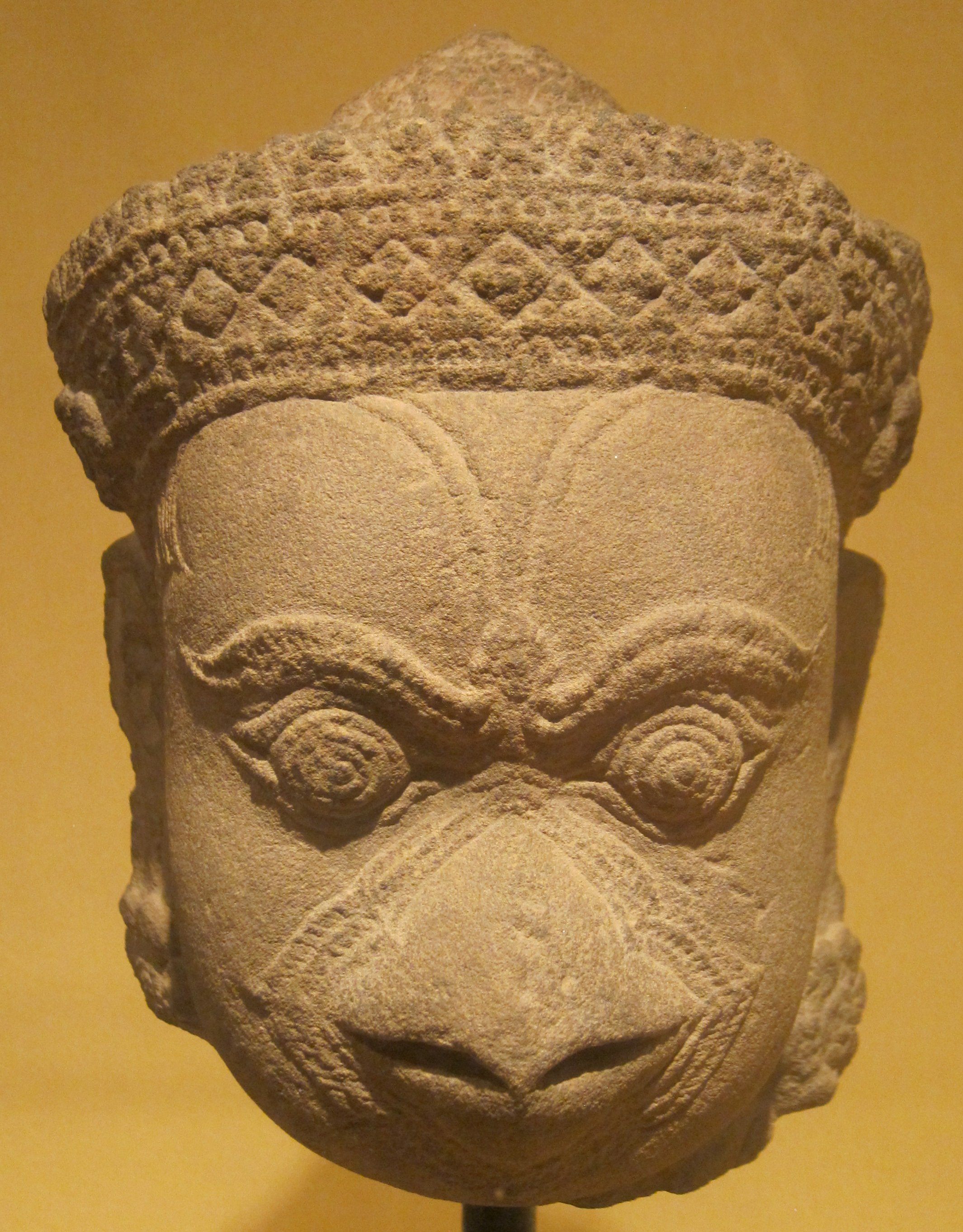
Head of a Garuda during the 14th century Cambodia, Honolulu Museum of Art

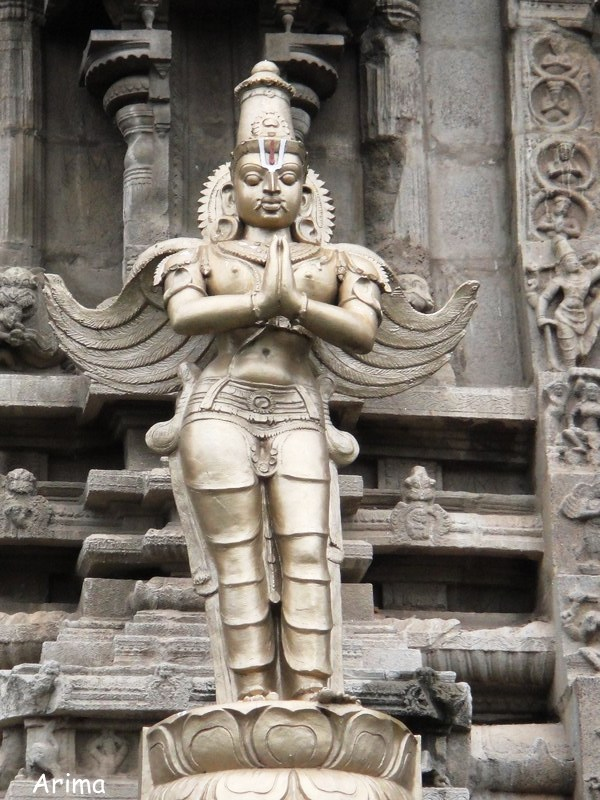
Garuda at Srivilliputhur Andal temple, Tamil Nadu, India

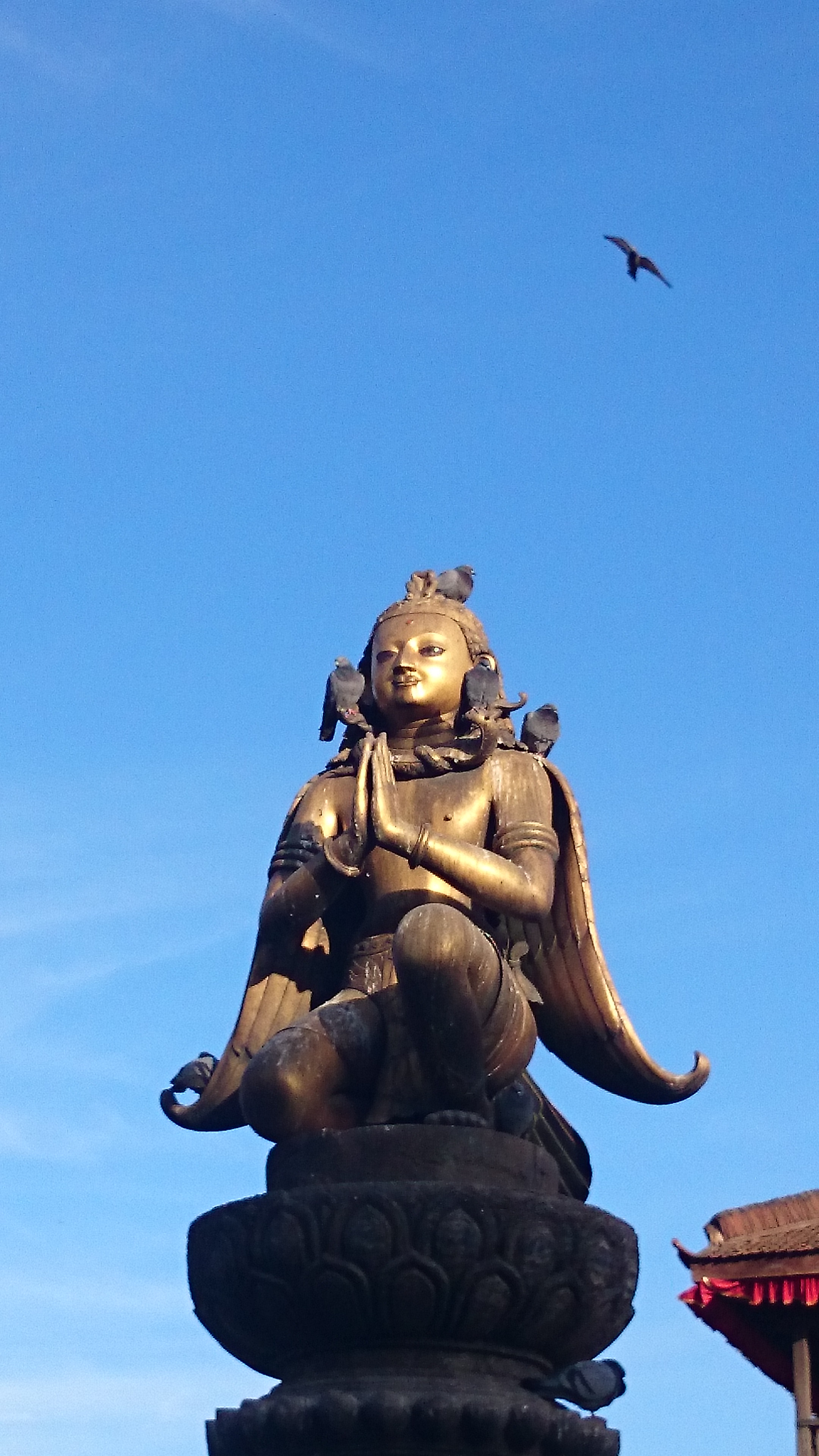
Garuda pillar, Nepal

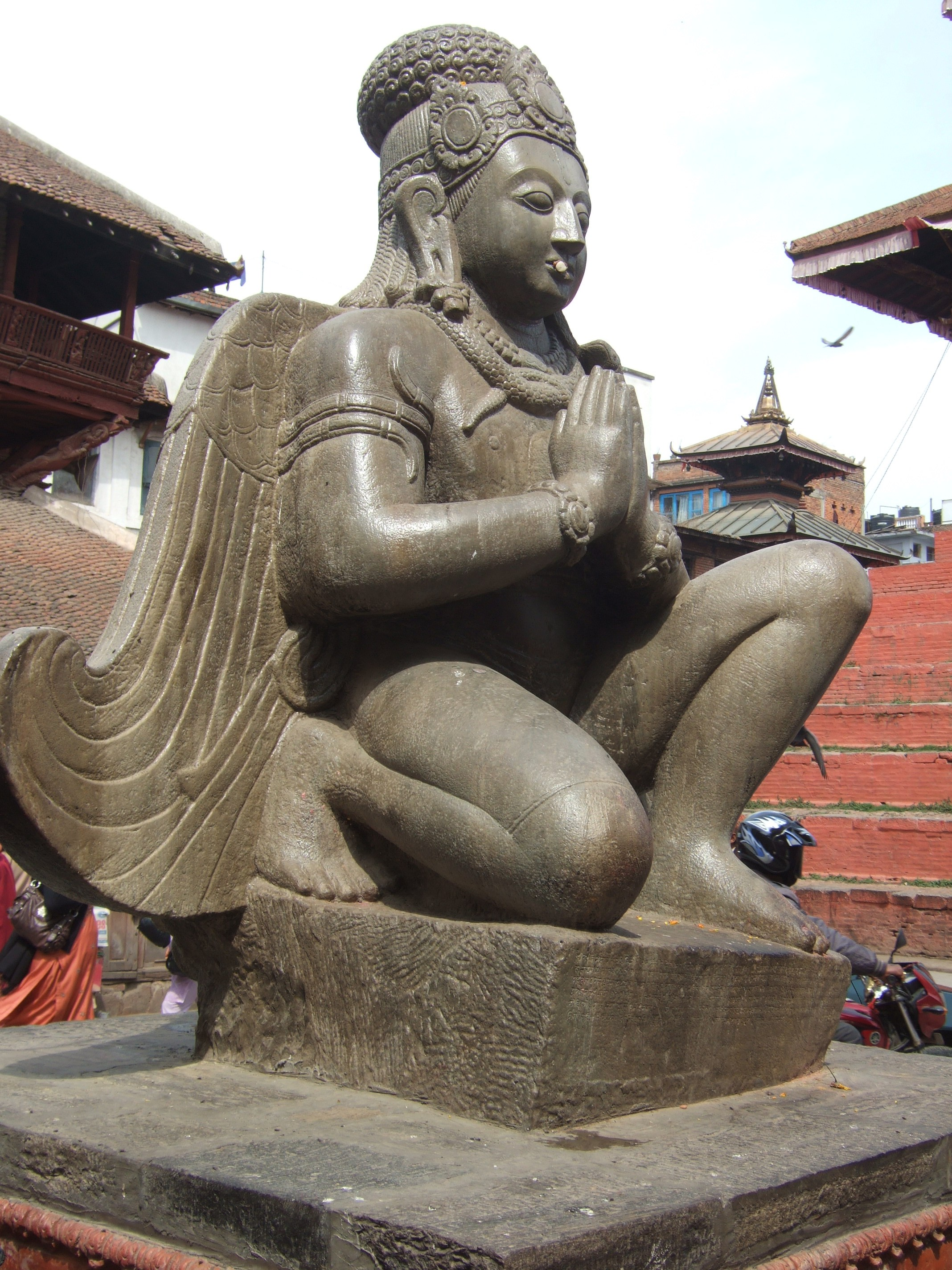
Garuda at Durbar square in Kathmandu, Nepal.

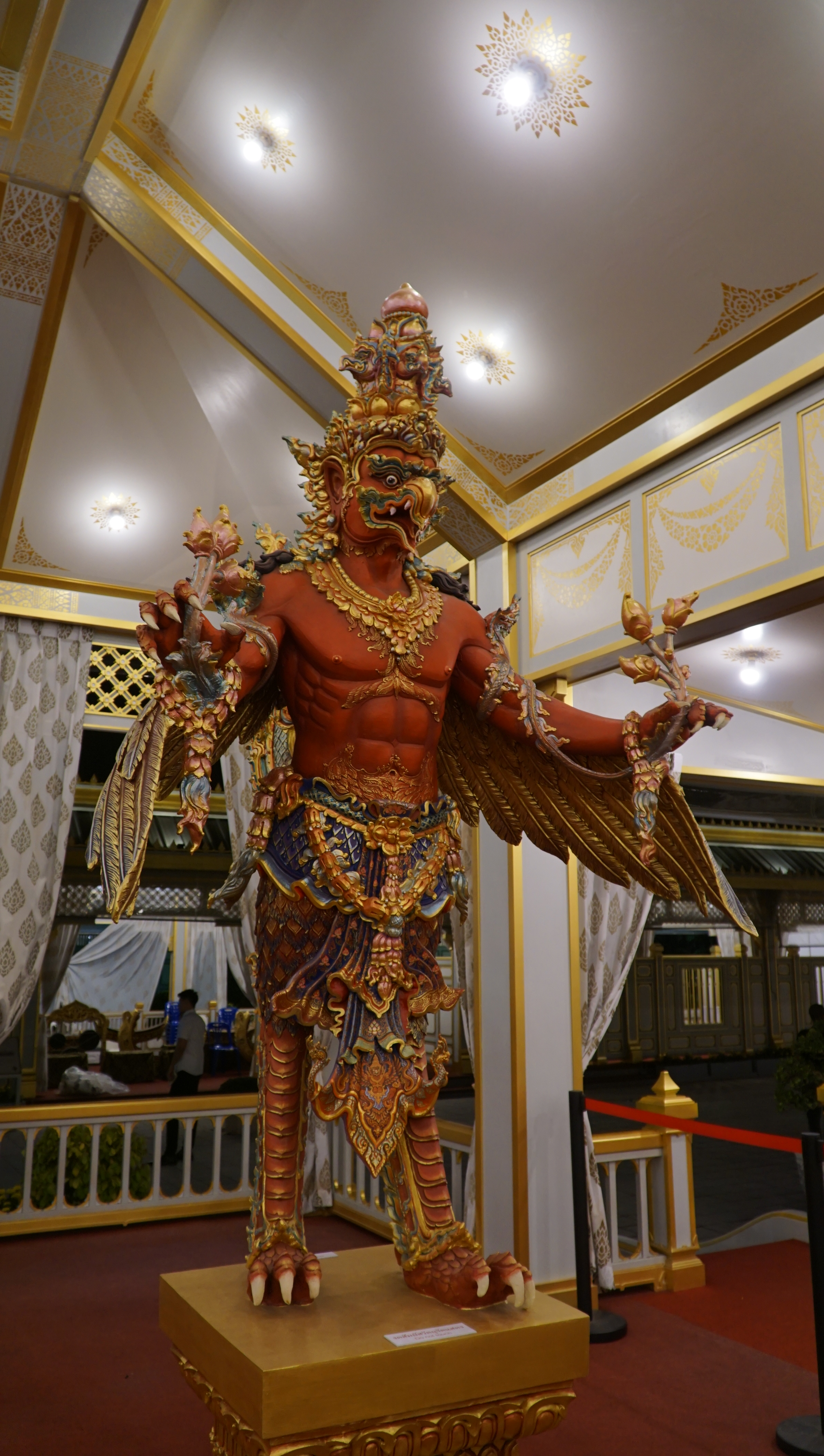
Garuda at the funeral of King Bhumibol Adulyadej of Thailand in 2017

Artworks

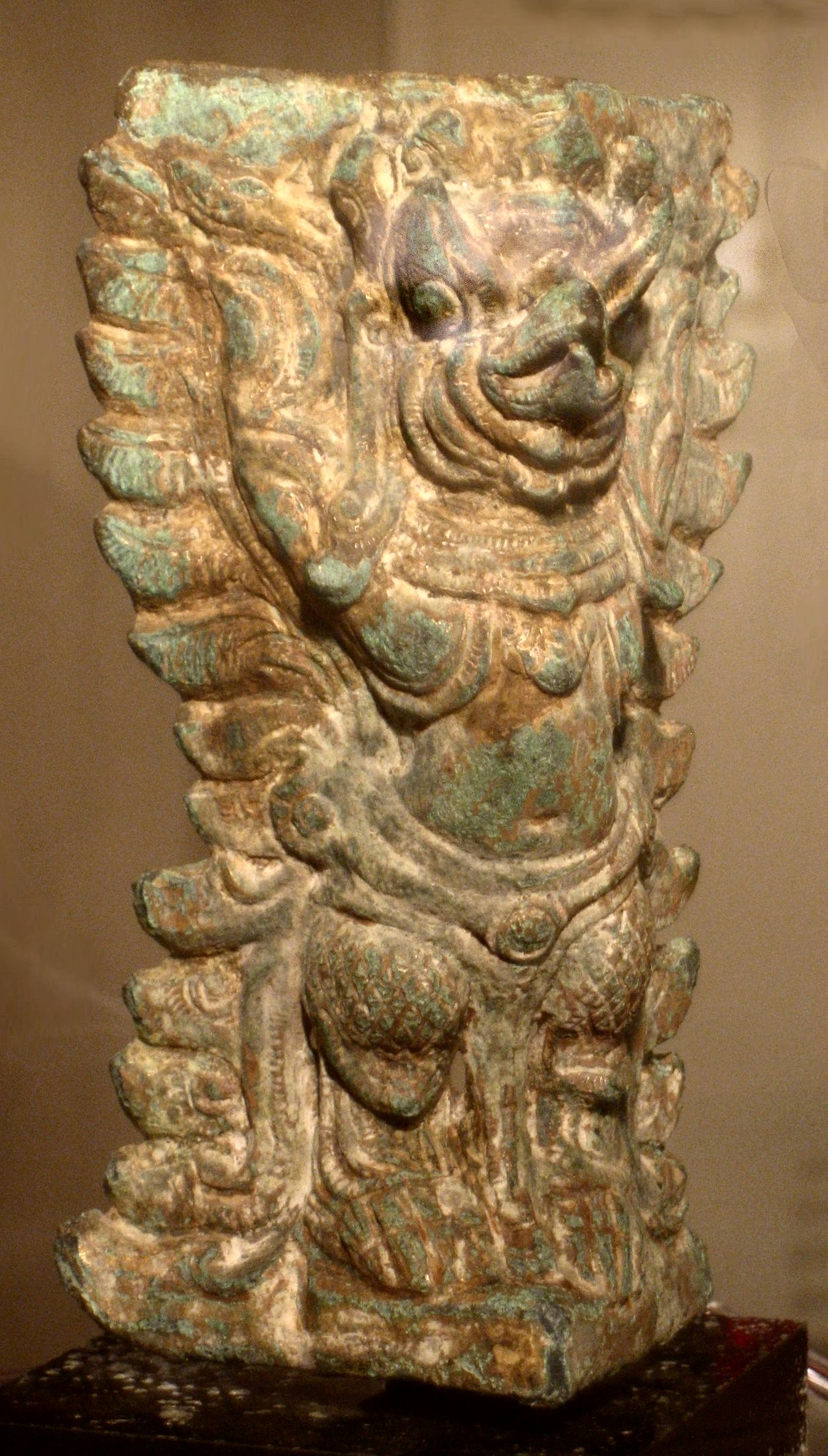
Garuda figure, gilt bronze, Khmer Empire Cambodia, 12th-13th century, John Young Museum, University of Hawaii at Manoa

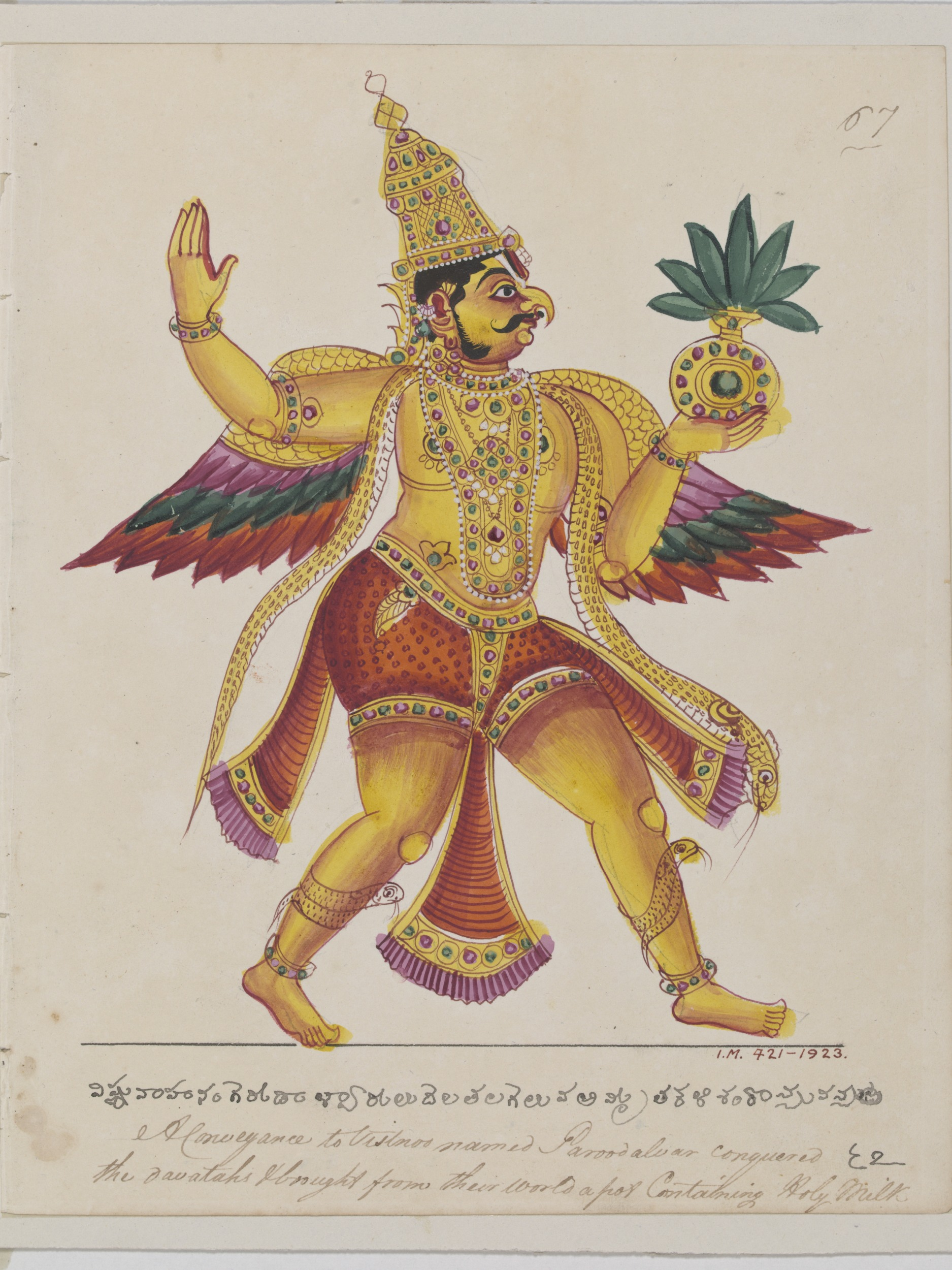
Garuda returning with the vase of Amrita

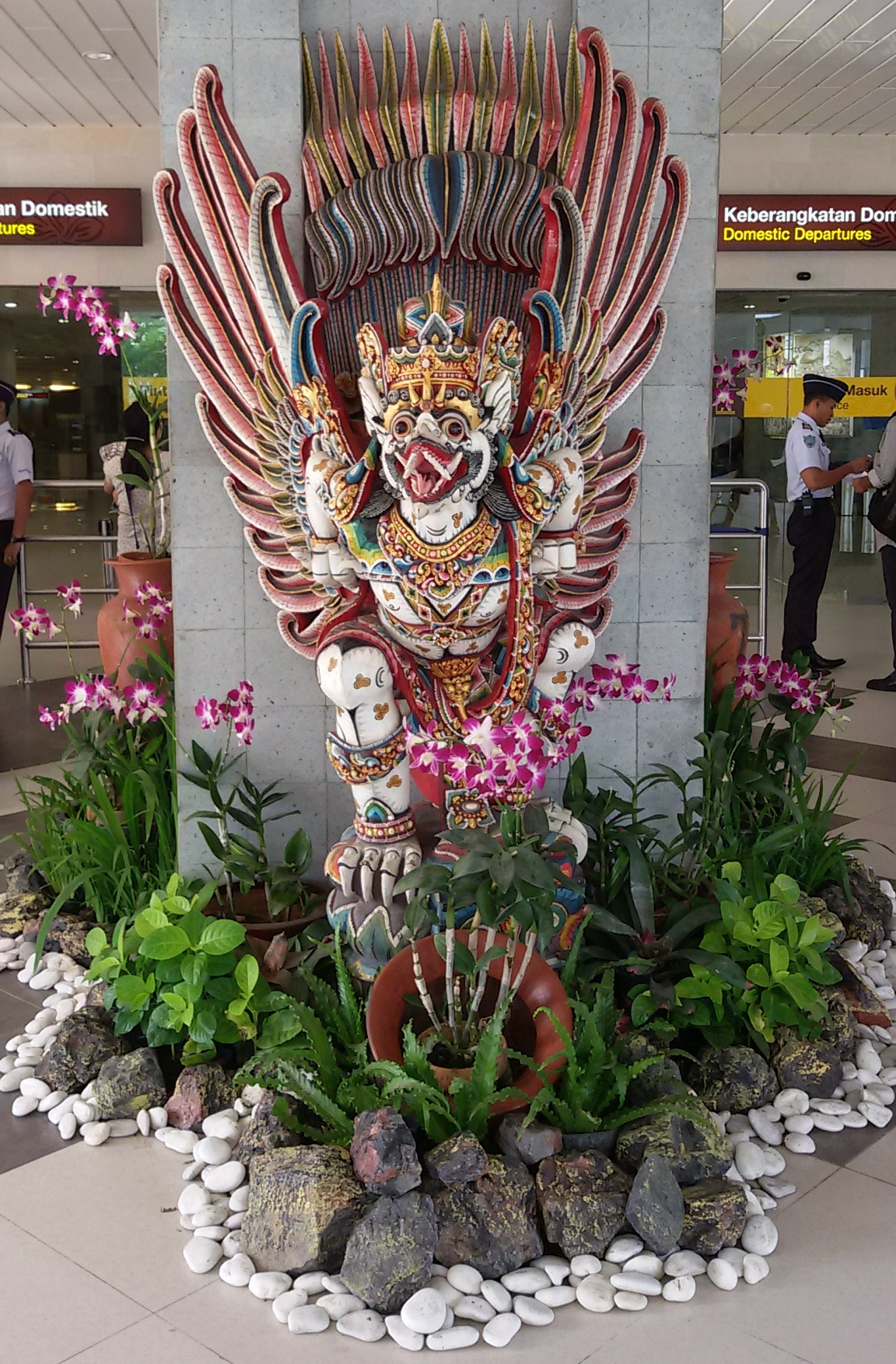
Balinese Garuda statue at Ngurah Rai Airport, Bali, Indonesia

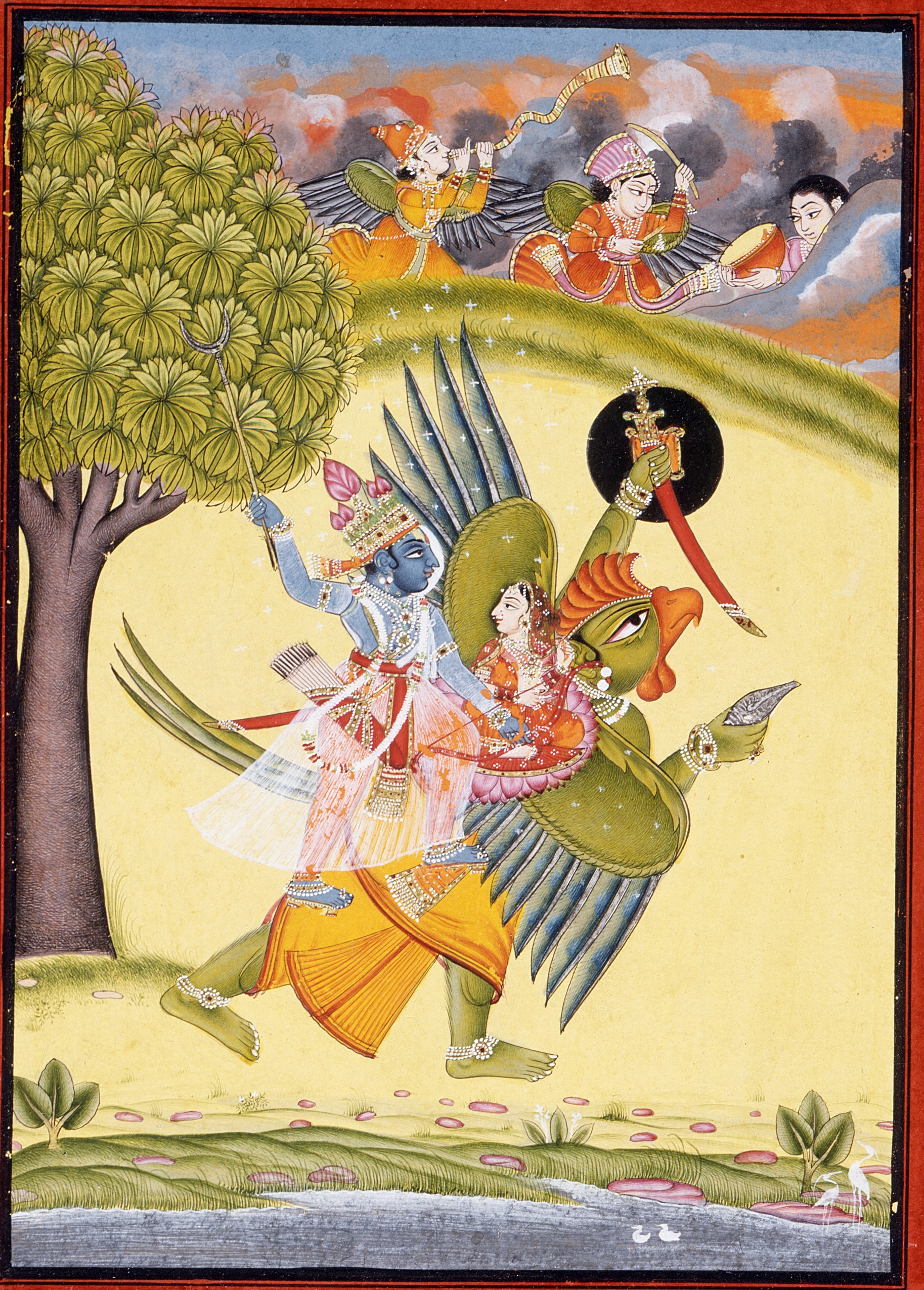
Garuda carries Vishnu and Lakshmi

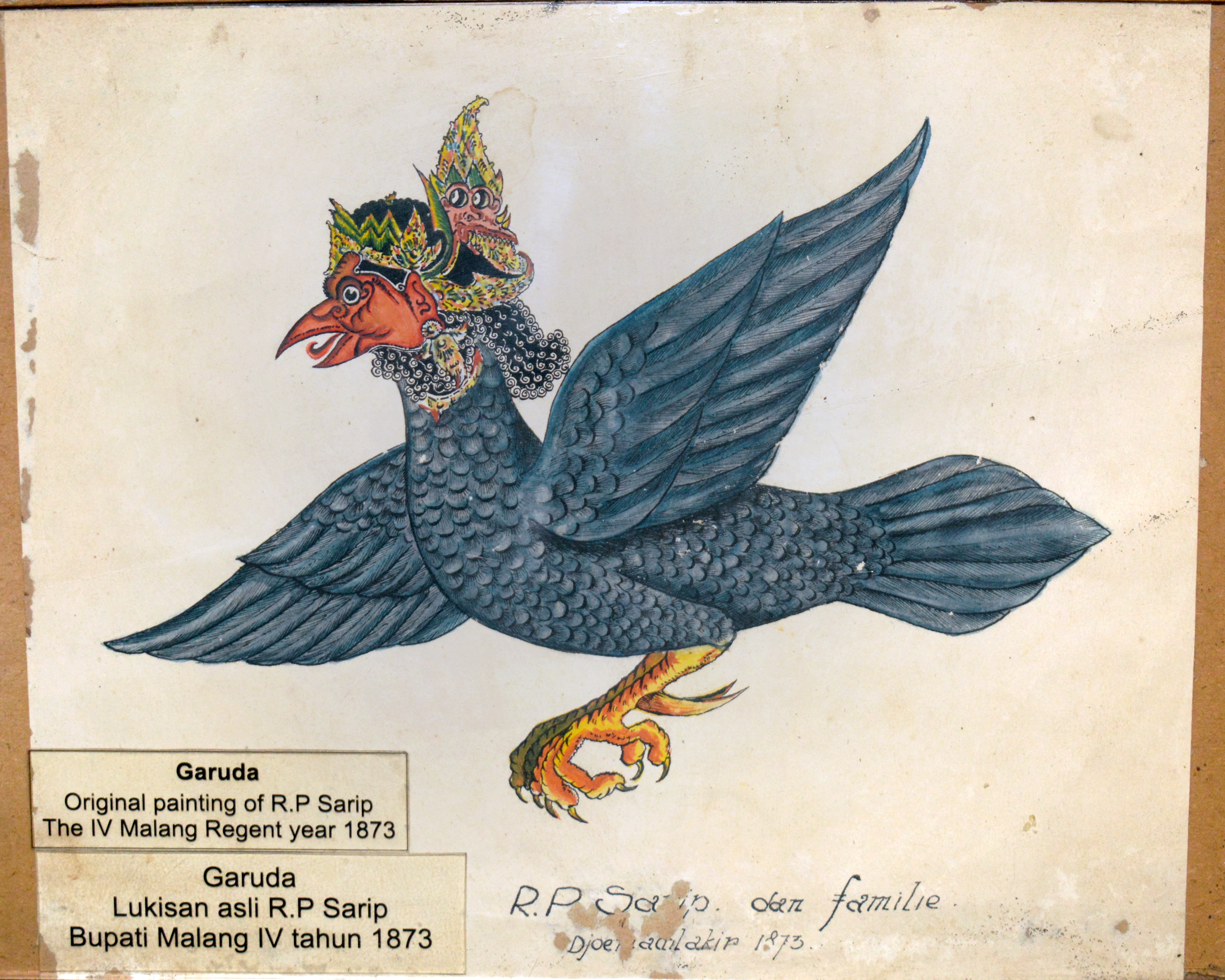
Javanese Garuda according to Raden P. Sjarip, then 4th Regent of Malang

== See also ==
- Ababil
- Fenghuang
- Garid
- Garuda in the architecture of Cambodia
- Garuda Dandaka
- Garuda Linux
- Garuda Purana
- Garudasana
- Harpy
- Kalaviṅka
- Karura
- Konrul
- List of avian humanoids
- Roc
- Sarutahiko Ōkami
- Simurgh
- Sirin
- Tengu
- Thunderbird
- Turul
