= Garid =

Garid (Mongolian: гарьд) is a Mongolian word corresponding to the Sanskrit Garuda with several connotations related Mongolian culture. The Garuda is a large mythical bird-like creature or humanoid bird that appears in both Hindu and Buddhist mythology. Garid is a rank in traditional Mongolian wrestling meaning "mythical bird" as well as the name of the pet eagle of Genghis Khan.

== Mongolian Wrestling Rank ==
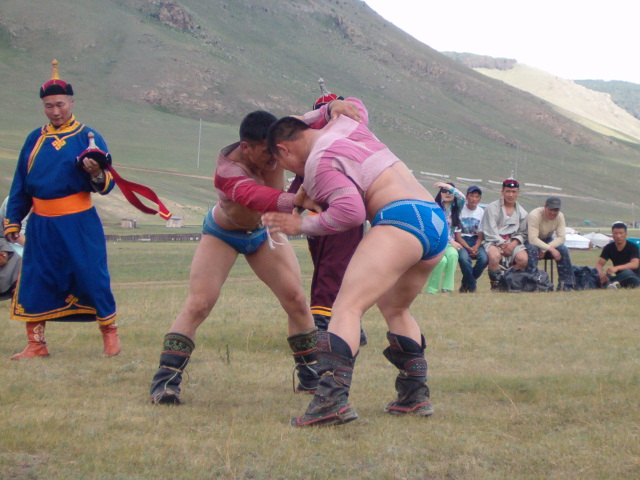
Wrestling in the 2005 Naadam festival near Ulaanbaatar. As of 2003, garid became a rank in traditional Mongolian wrestling

Mongolian wrestling has a seven thousand-year history and continues into the present during the annual Mongolian festival of Naadam. Cave paintings in the Bayankhongor Province of Mongolia dating back to Neolithic age of 7000 BC show grappling of two naked men and surrounded by crowds. The art of Bökh appears on bronze plates discovered in the ruins of the Xiongnu empire (206 BC–220 AD). Originally, Bökh was a military sport intended to provide mainly strength, stamina and skills training to troops. Genghis Khan (1206–1227) and the all later Emperors of the Mongol Empire (1206–1368) and also the Emperors of later Khanates were keen to support the sport for this reason so wrestling events were included in local festivals, or Naadam. Wrestling became a key factor when deciding the candidate rankings in imperial martial exams plus outstanding wrestlers were entitled to high distinctions.

The winners are of the wrestling competitions at the Naadam festival are honored with ancient titles: the winner of the fifth round gets the honorary title nachin ("falcon"), of the seventh and eighth rounds zaan ("elephant"), and of the tenth and eleventh rounds arslan ("lion"). The wrestler who becomes the absolute champion is awarded the title of avarga ("titan"). Every subsequent victory at the national Naadam festival by a wrestler of the avarga rank adds an epithet to the title, for example Invincible Titan to be remembered by all. Beginning in 2003, the State Great Khural adopted a new law on Naadam, making amendments to some of the wrestling titles. The titles of Iarudi and Khartsaga (meaning "mythical bird" and "hawk" respectively) were added to the existing titles.

== Genghis Khan ==
Genghis Khan, Mongol emperor

The Mongols gained fame in the 13th century when under Genghis Khan they established a huge Eurasian empire through conquest. Genghis Khan came to power by uniting many of the nomadic tribes of northeast Asia. After founding the Mongol Empire and being proclaimed "Genghis Khan", he started the Mongol invasions that resulted in the conquest of most of Eurasia. These included raids or invasions of the Kara-Khitan Khanate, Caucasus, Khwarezmid Empire, Western Xia and Jin dynasties. These campaigns were often accompanied by wholesale massacres of the civilian populations – especially in Khwarezmia. By the end of his life, the Mongol Empire occupied a substantial portion of Central Asia and China.

During this time Genghis Khan had a pet eagle, garid, which was honored in 2003 through Mongolian State Great Khural naming as one of the esteemed titles in Mongolian wrestling after this eagle.

Eagles remain popular pets in Mongolia and continue to be used for hunting, as evidenced by the popularity of annual festivals such as the Golden Eagle festival in the Bayan-Ölgii aimag. During this festival, hunters catch small animals including foxes and hares by their trained eagles.

== See also ==
- Golden Eagle festival
- Genghis Khan
- Mongolia
- Mongolian wrestling
- Naadam
