= Kurma =

Tortoise form of the Hindu god Vishnu

- Member of Dashavatara
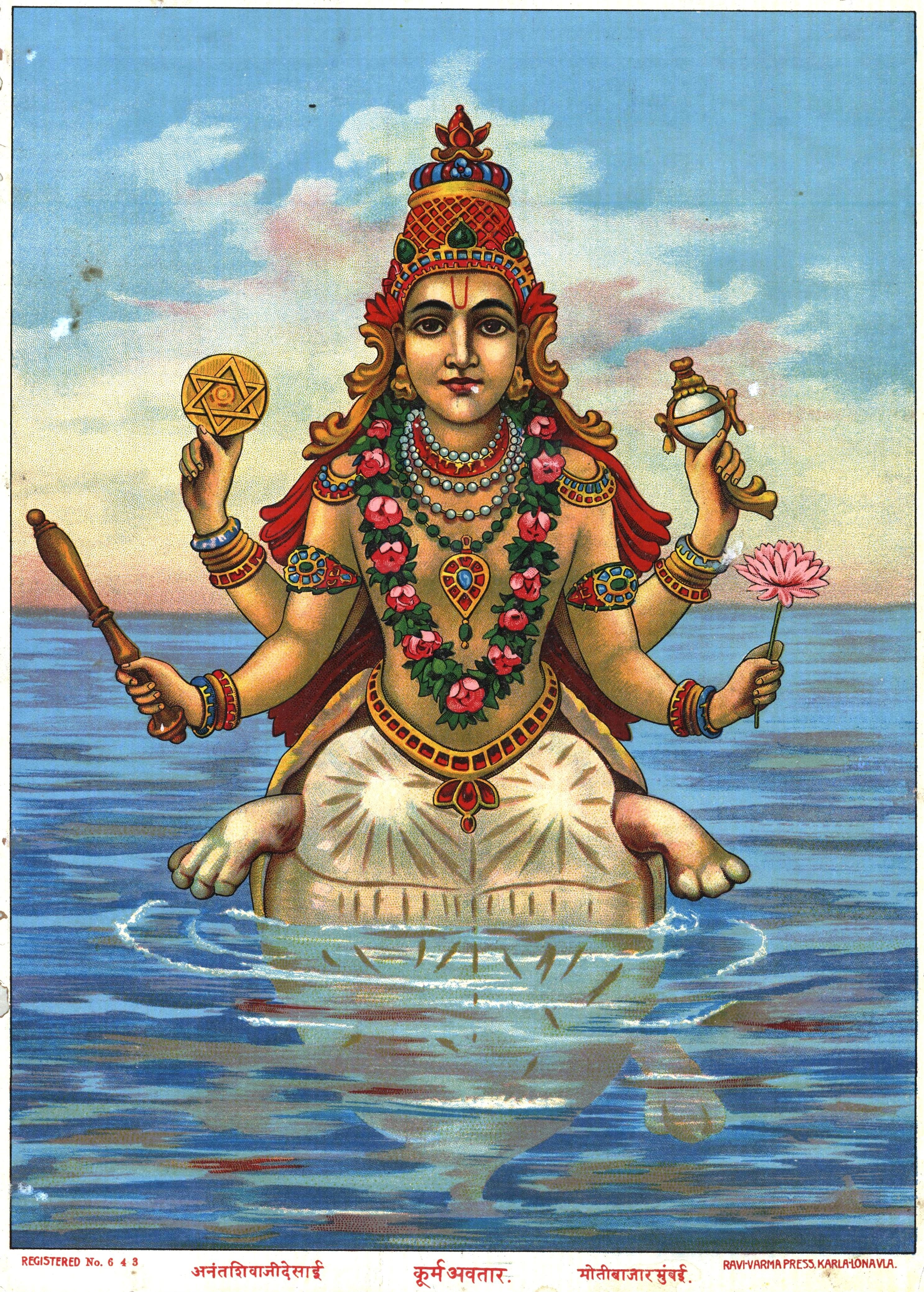
- Kurma Avatar by Raja Ravi Varma
- Devanagari: कूर्म
- Affiliation: Vaishnavism
- Abode: Bharata Khanda, Vaikuntha, Srikurmam
- Mantra: Om Kurmaya Namah
- Weapon: None
- Festivals: Kurma Jayanti
- Consort: Lakshmi as Sindhusuta

Dashavatara Sequence
- Predecessor: Matsya
- Successor: Varaha

Kurma (Sanskrit: कूर्म, lit. 'Turtle' or 'Tortoise'), is the second avatar of the Hindu preserver deity, Vishnu. Originating in Vedic literature such as the Yajurveda as being synonymous with the Saptarishi called Kashyapa, Kurma is most commonly associated in post-Vedic literature such as the Puranas. He prominently appears in the legend of the churning of the Ocean of Milk, referred to as the Samudra Manthana. Along with being synonymous with Akupara, the World-Turtle supporting the Earth, Kurma is listed as the 2nd avatar in the Dashavatara, which are the ten principal incarnations of Vishnu.

== Nomenclature and etymology ==
The Sanskrit word 'Kurma' (Devanagari: कूर्म) means 'Tortoise' and 'Turtle'. The tortoise incarnation of Vishnu is also referred to in post-Vedic literature such as the Bhagavata Purana as 'Kacchapa' (कच्छप), 'Kamaṭha' (कमठ), 'Akupara' (अकूपार), and 'Ambucara-Atmana' (अम्बुचर-आत्मना), all of which mean 'tortoise' or 'form of a tortoise'.

=== The Nirukta ===
Written by the grammarian Yaska, the Nirukta is one of the six Vedangas or 'limbs of the Vedas', concerned with correct etymology and interpretation of the Vedas. The entry for the Tortoise states (square brackets '[ ]' are as per the original author):

May we obtain that illimitable gift of thine. The sun is called akupara also, i. e. unlimited, because it is immeasurable. The ocean, too, is called akupara, i. e. unlimited, because it is boundless. A tortoise is also called a-kupa-ara, because it does not move in a well [On account of its shallowness]. Kacchapa (tortoise) is (so called because) it protects (pati) its mouth (kaccham), or it protects itself by means of its shell (kacchena), or it drinks (√pa) by the mouth. Kaccha (mouth or shell of a tortoise) = kha-ccha, i. e. something which covers (chddayatl) space (kham). This other (meaning of) kaccha, 'a bank of a river', is derived from the same (root) also, i.e. water (kam) is covered (chadyate) by it.

— The Nighantu and the Nirukta [of Yaska], translated by Lakshman Sarup (1967), Chapter 4, Section 18

=== Kashyapa ===
As illustrated below, Vedic literature such as the Samaveda and Yajurveda explicitly state Akupara/Kurma and the sage Kashyapa are Synonymous. Kashyapa - also meaning 'Tortoise' - is considered the Progenitor of all living beings with his thirteen wives, including vegetation, as related by H.R. Zimmer:

Ira [meaning 'fluid']... is known as the queen-consort of still another old creator-god and father of creatures, Kashyapa, the Old Tortoise Man, and as such she is the mother of all vegetable life.

— Myths And Symbols In Indian Art And Civilization by Heinrich Robert Zimmer, 1946), Chapter 6

The legend of the churning of the Ocean of Milk (Samudra Manthana) developed in post-Vedic literature is itself inextricably linked with Kurma (as the base of the churning rod) and involves other sons of Kashyapa: the devas/adityas (born from Aditi) and the asuras/Danavas/Daityas (born from Danu and Diti) use one of the Naga (born from Kadru) as a churning rope to obtain Amrita. Garuda, the king of birds and mount of Vishnu, is another son of Kashyapa (born from Vinata) often mentioned in this legend. In another, Garuda seeks the Amrita produced (eating a warring Elephant And Tortoise in the process) to free his mother and himself from enslavement from Kadru.

=== Yoga ===
Kurmasana (Tortoise Posture) is a Yoga posture. 'Panikacchapika' (Sanskrit पाणिकच्छपिका), meaning 'Hand Tortoise', is a special positioning of the fingers during worship rituals to symbolise Kurma. The Kurmacakra is a Yantra, a mystical diagram for worship, in the shape of a tortoise. These are all mentioned in the Upanishads and Puranas (see below).

== Symbolism ==
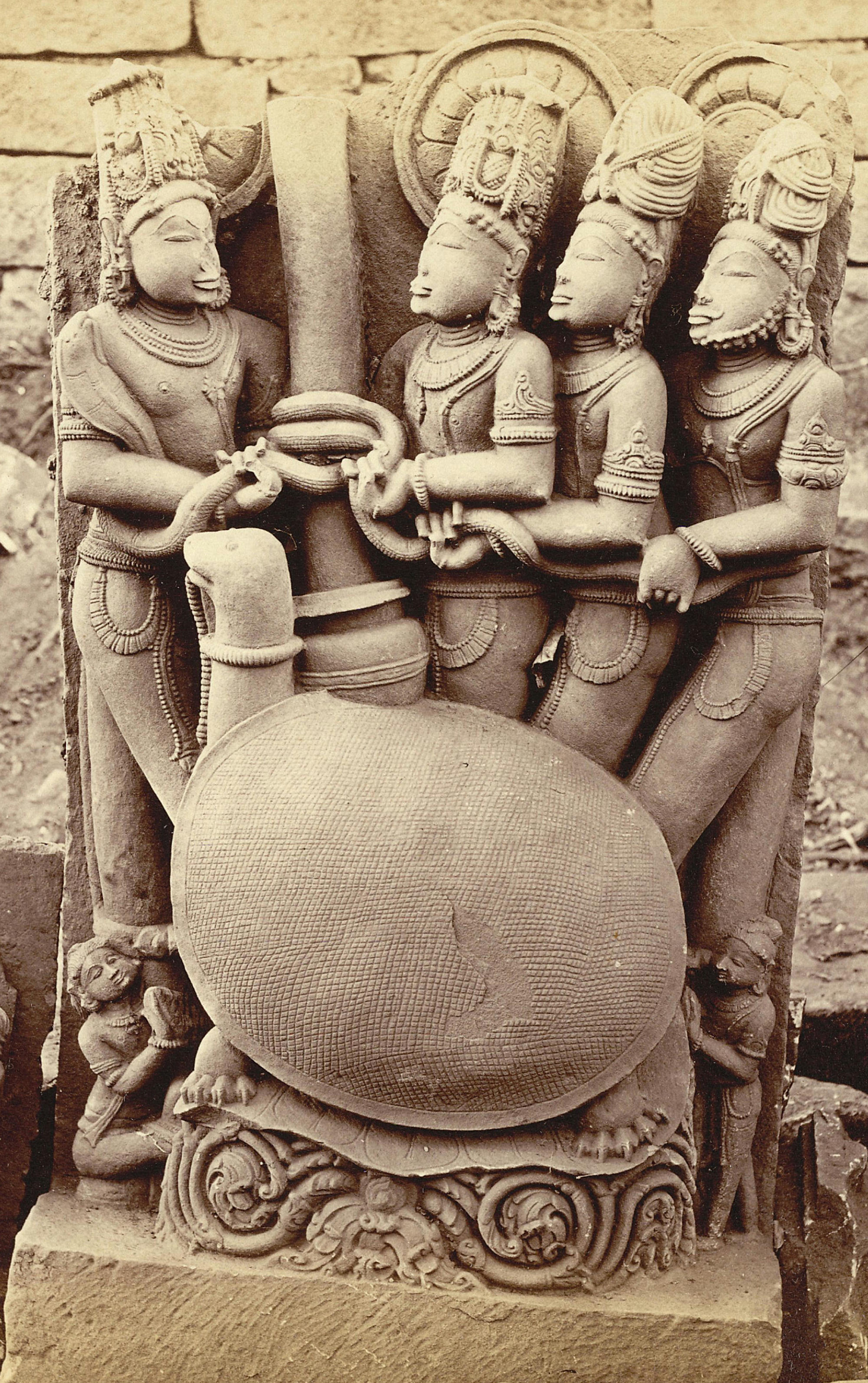
Kurmavatara, tortoise incarnation of Vishnu, from Garhwa, Prayagraj District

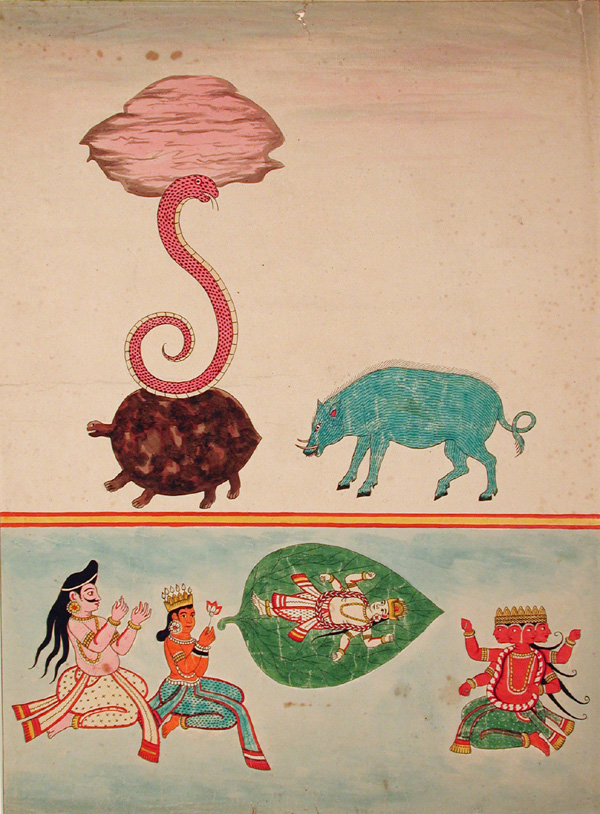
Kurma with Sesa holding the Earth (left), Varaha (right), and Vishnu (below, centre).

The Dashavataras are compared to evolution; Kurma - the amphibian - is regarded the next stage after Matysa, the fish.

Firmness / Steadiness: W. Caland notes that in relation to 'Akupara Kashyapa' in the Pancavimsa Brahmana and Jaiminiya Brahmana, the tortoise is equal to 'a firm standing... and Kashyapa (The Tortoise) is able to convey (them) across the sea [of material existence]'. P.N. Sinha seems to support this view, adding 'Kurma was a great Avatara as He prepared the way for the spiritual regeneration of the universe, by the Churning of the Ocean Of Milk'.

Deity Yajna-Purusha: N. Aiyangar states that as the tortoise was 'used as the very basis of the fire Altar, the hidden invisible tortoise, taken together with the altar and the sacred fire, seems to have been regarded as symbolizing the Deity Yajna-Purusha who is an invisible spiritual god extending from the fire altar up to heaven and everywhere... this seems to be the reason why the tortoise is identified with the sun'.

Meditation / Churning the Mind: Aiyangar also surmises that the legend of the Samudra Manthana symbolises churning the mind through Meditation to achieve liberation (Moksha). Based on the mention of Vatarasanaḥ ('Girdled By The Wind') Munis in the Taittirtya Aranyaka - also referred to as urdhvamanthin, meaning 'those who churn upwards' - and the explanation provided in the Shvetashvatara Upanishad, Aiyangar believes this would 'appear to be the hidden pivot on which the gist of the riddle of the Puranic legend about the Churning For Nectar turns'. R. Jarow seems to agree, stating the churning of the Ocean of Milk represents the 'Churning Of The Dualistic Mind'.

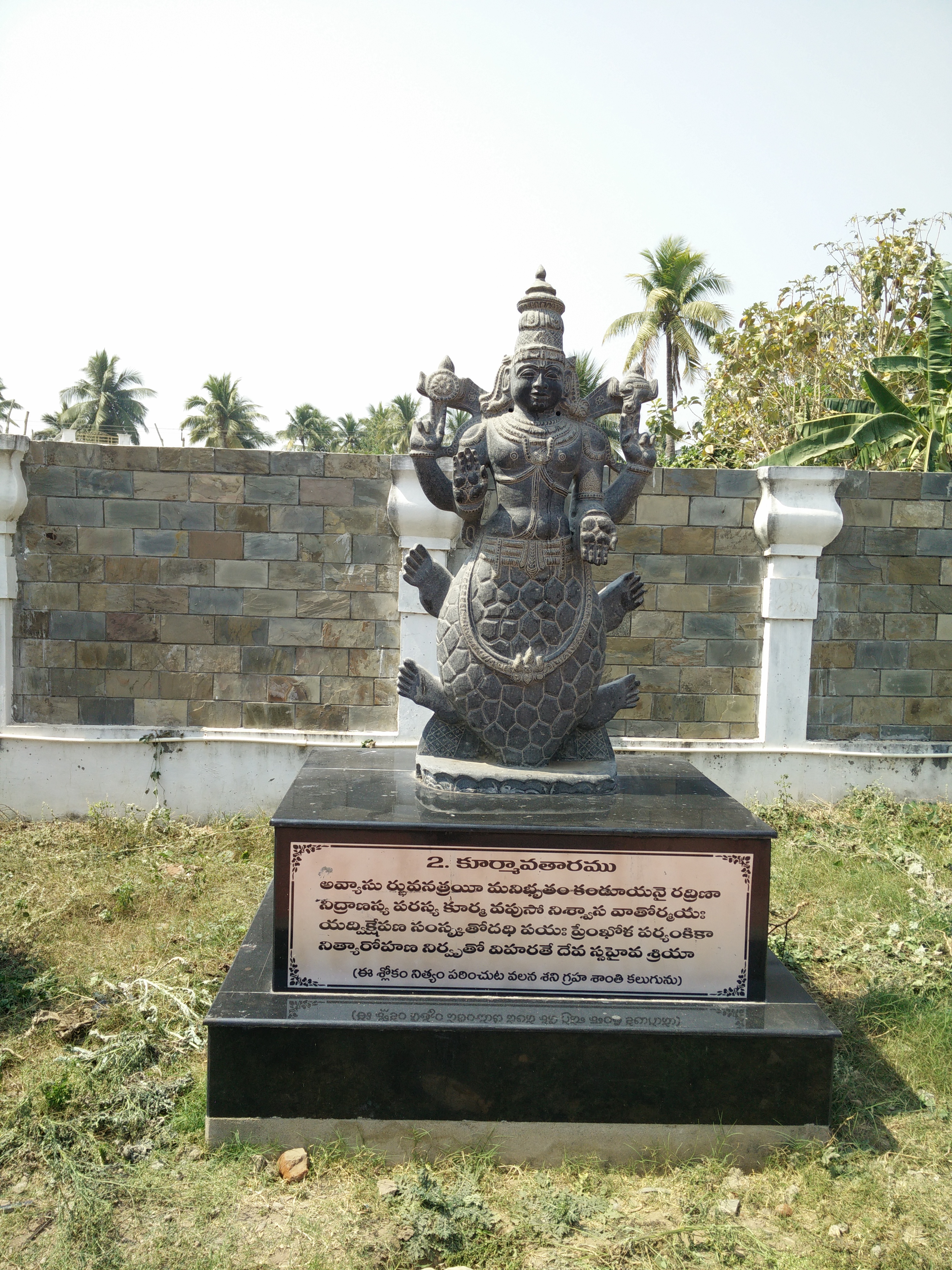
The Sculpture of Kurma Avatar in, Kurmanatha Temple

Ascetic Penance: H.H. Wilson notes that 'the account [of the Samudra Manthana] in the Hari Vamsa... is explained, by the commentator, as an Allegory, in which the churning of the ocean typifies ascetic penance, and the Ambrosia is final Liberation' (Linking With The Idea Of 'Steadiness' And 'Firmness'), but personally dismisses this interpretation as 'Mere Mystification' (Note 1, pp. 146).

Astronomy: B.G. Sidharth states that the legend of the Samudra Manthana symbolises astronomic phenomena, for example that 'Mandara represents the polar regions of Earth [and the] Churning Rope, Vasuki, symbolizes the slow annual motion of Earth... Vishnu, or the Sun himself rests upon a coiled snake... which represents the rotation of the Sun on its own axis'. In regards to the tortoise supporting the Earth, Sidharth adds that the 'Twelve Pillars... are evidently the twelve months of the year, and... The four elephants on which Earth rests are the Dikarin, the sentinels of the four directions.. [Kurma] symbolizes the fact that Earth is supported in space in its annual orbit around the Sun'.

== Vedas ==
A.A. Macdonell, A.B. Keith, J. Roy, J. Dowson, and W.J. Wilkins all state that the origin of Kurma is in the Vedas, specifically the Shatapatha Brahmana (related to the YajurVeda), where the name is also synonymous with Kashyapa, one of the Saptarishi (seven sages).

The Shatapatha Brahmana is the earliest extant text to mention Kurma, the tortoise. The Shatapatha Brahmana equates the tortoise - Kurma to the creator of all creatures. The god Prajapati assumes the form of Kurma to create all creatures (praja). Since he "made" (kar) all, Prajapati's form was called Kurma. Kurma is equated with Kashyapa (literally "tortoise"), thus all creatures are called "children of Kashyapa". Kurma is also called Surya (the sun).

The Shatapatha Brahmana also has the origins of Matsya, the Fish. Like Kurma, Matsya is also associated as the avatar of Vishnu later in the Puranas.

The Taittiriya Samhita suggests a ritual of burying a live tortoise at the base of the sacrificial fire altar (uttar-vedi). By this act, the sacrificer earns the merit of reaching heaven. Aiyangar suggests that the tortoise symbolizes Yajna-Purusha, the all-pervading god of Sacrifice. In another instance in the Taittiriya Samhita where Prajapati assigns sacrifices for the gods and places the oblation within himself, "the Sacrificial Cake" (Purodasa) is said to become a tortoise.

The Taittiriya Aranyaka describes a similar practice in a ritual called Arunaketuka-kayana where the tortoise is buried under the altar. Here, Prajapati or his "juice" (rasa) the tortoise is called Arunaketu ("one who has red rays"). Prajapati performs austerities (tapas). From his rasa springs a tortoise swimming in the water. Prajapati declares to the tortoise to be his creation; in response the tortoise says that he has existed from "before" and manifests as Purusha - the primordial being and creates various deities including the sun, Agni (the fire), Indra, Vayu (the wind) and various beings. The tortoise is again treated as the divine Creator of the universe.

R.T.H. Griffith states that tortoises were buried in construction of the Ahavaniya Fire-Altar. In this context, the Vajasaneyi Samhita of the white Yajurveda describes the tortoise as the "lord of the waters". The selection of the tortoise may stream from the belief that it supports the world.

Though Kurma is not found in the oldest Hindu scripture Rigveda, the seer Kashyapa (who is equated with Kurma) appears in hymns in the scripture. The Atharvaveda regards Kashyapa, who is mentioned along with or identified with Prajapati, as svayambhu ("self-manifested"). In later Hindu scriptures like the epics and the Puranas, Kashyapa is described as the grandfather of Manu, the progenitor of mankind. Apart from described as one of Saptarishi (seven great sages), he is described as one of the Prajapatis ("agents of creation") and marries 13 daughters of Daksha, fathering gods, demons, animals, birds and various living beings. The seer Kashyapa, tortoise, being referred in various later Vedic literature as the progenitor of beings, is inferred by A.A. Macdonell along with other animal-based tribal names in the Rigveda to suggest totemism; however E.W. Hopkins disagrees.

The Rigveda also refers in a hymn that Vayu churned for the sages (munis) and Rudra drinks from a cup of visha, which can be mean water or poison. John Muir suggests that visha in the Rigveda refers to Rudra drinking water, however it may have led to, in the Puranas, the legend of Shiva (who is closely linked to the Vedic Rudra) drinking poison in the Samudra Manthana (churning of the ocean) episode.

=== Samaveda ===
Sama	References		Notes
Sama	Pancavimsa Brahmana	15.5.30	This verse is in regards to Kashyapa, synonymous with Kurma ('Tortoise').
Sama	Jaiminiya Brahmana	3.210	As stated by W. Caland in his translation of the Pancavisma Brahmana. Caland's German translation of the Jaiminiya Brahmana with this verse is available.

29. There is the Akupara(Saman). ('The Chant of Akupara'). 30. By means of this (Saman), Akupara Kasyapa attained power and greatness. Power and Greatness attains he who in lauding has practised the Akupara(Saman).

— Pancavimsa Brahmana (translated by W. Caland, 1931), Prapathaka XV (15), Khanda 5, Verses 29-30

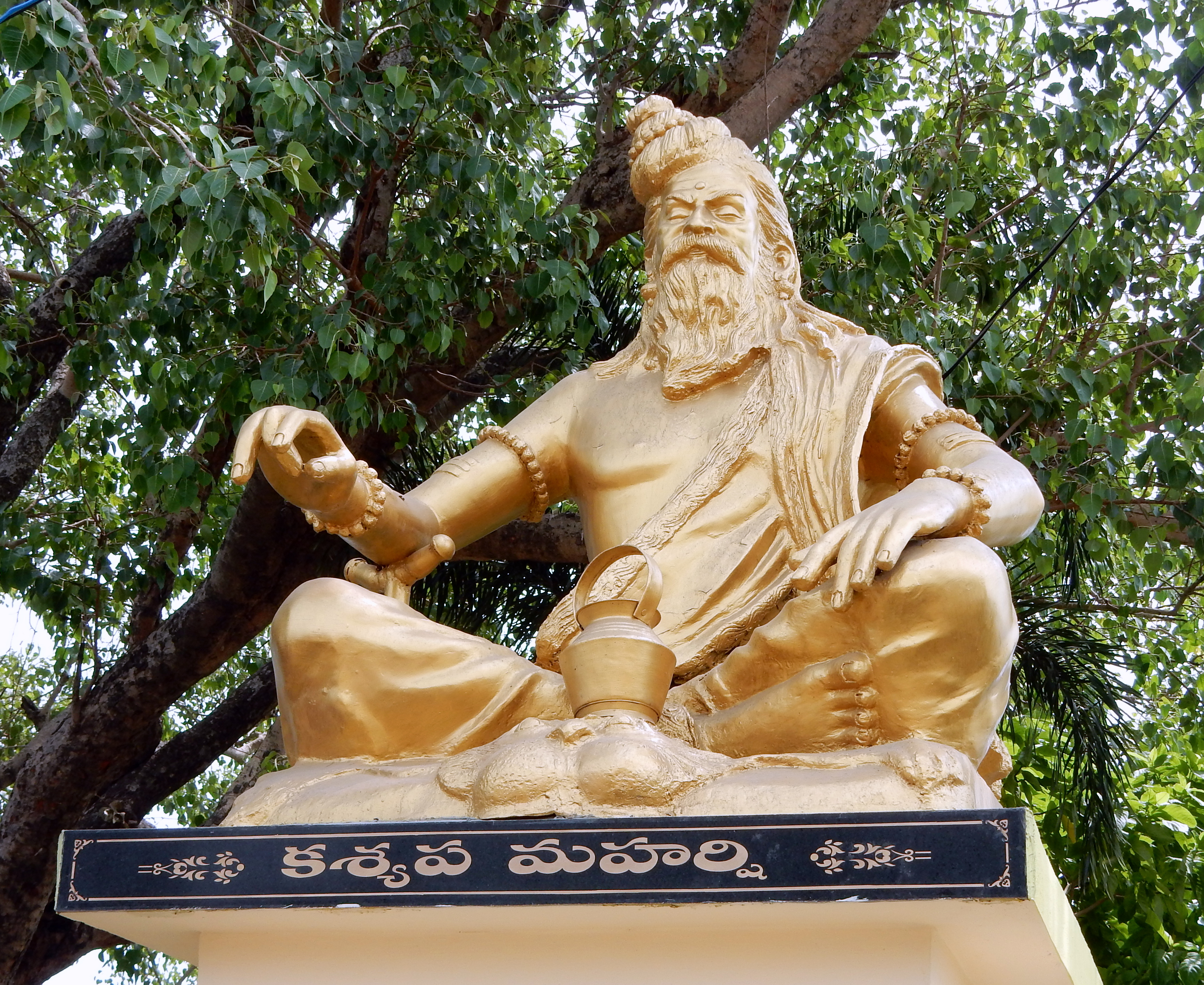
Kashyapa Muni, one of the Saptarishi (Seven Rishis) during the reign of the sixth (and current) Manu, Chakshusha.

The sage Kashyapa - stated in the Vedas, Itihāsa (Epics), and Puranas to be the progenitor of all living beings (see relevant sections, below) - is also stated to be synonymous with Akupara, the name of the 'World-Turtle' in the Mahabharata. Caland explains in his footnote to verse 30 the significance of this name by quoting from the Jaiminiya Brahmana:

Akupara Kasyapa descended together with the Kalis, into the sea. He sought it in firm standing. He saw this atman and lauded with it. Thereupon, he found a firm standing in the sea, viz., this earth. Since that time, the Kalis sit on his back. This Saman is (Equal To) a firm standing. A firm standing gets he who knows thus. The Chandoma(-Day)s are a sea... and Kasyapa (The Tortoise) is able to convey (Them) across the sea. That there is here this Akupara, is for crossing over the sea.

— Pancavimsa Brahmana (translated by W. Caland, 1931), Note 1 (extract from Jaiminiya Brahmana, 210), pp. 407

The Jaiminiya Brahmana explicitly links Akupara, Kashyapa, and the tortoise in regards to providing a 'Firm Standing' to cross over the sea of material existence. As illustrated below, in the Yajurveda, Kashyapa is also stated to be Synonymous with Prajapati (i.e. the Creator-God Brahma) and with Kurma. In the Puranas, Kashyapa is frequently referred to as 'Prajapati' as well.

== Epics ==
Swami Achuthananda states that although varied like other legends, Vishnu's role is "limited" as Kurma, compared his other avatars.

The epics present the earliest known versions of the popular Samudra Manthana narrative. In the Adi Parva Book of the epic Mahabharata, the god Narayana (identified with Vishnu) suggests the gods (devas) and the demons (asuras) churn the ocean to obtain amrita (ambrosia) as both of them seek immortality. The gods select Mount Mandara as the churning rod and the serpent Vasuki-Ananta as the rope. Then they approach Kurma-raja, the king of tortoises to support the mount on its back, which it consented. The gods churn from the tail side of the serpent, while asuras on the head side. Various trees and herbs are cast into the ocean. The churned water takes into milk. Ultimately, various precious items like Soma (the moon), the goddess Sri (Lakshmi), Sura (liquor), the white horse Uchchaihshravas, the white elephant Airavata, the gem Kaustubha and finally the god Dhanvantari with the vessel of amrita emerge from the ocean. The poison kalakuta springs from the ocean and is drunk by Shiva, whose throat becomes blue earning him the epithet Nila-kantha (The blue necked). The devas and asuras battle for the amrita. Narayana becomes an enchanting woman (called Mohini in later scriptures) and snatch the pot of amrita from the asuras. Narayana along with Nara battle the asuras, while the enchantress distributes the amrita only to the gods. Rahu, an asura, disguises himself as a god and tries to drink some Amrita himself. Surya (the sun-god) and Chandra (the moon-god) quickly inform Vishnu, and he uses the Chakra (the divine discus) to decapitate Rahu, leaving the head immortal. Eventually, the gods defeat the asuras with Indra retaining the amrita and appointing Nara as its guardian.

In this narrative, Kurma is not related with Vishnu. Though the critical edition of the epic does not refer to Kurma as an avatar of Vishnu, some latter insertions in manuscripts of the epic associate Kurma as a pradurbhava (manifestation) of Vishnu.

The Ramayana briefly mentions the Samudra Manthana episode, however does not mention Kurma in it. The epic mentions the ocean churned being the ocean of milk, the Kshirasagara. An passage, generally believed to be interpolated and not part of the critical edition, refers to Kurma as well as the drinking of the poison by Shiva. The mount Mandara sinks to Patala (the underworld) during the churning. On the beseeching of the gods, Vishnu takes the form of the tortoise and raises the mount on his back. Vishnu also supports the mount as holding its peak in a form and another form joins the gods in churning the ocean. Later versions of the Ramayana like the Adhyatma Ramayana associate Kurma with Rama, the male protagonist of the Ramayana who is also regarded as an avatar of Vishnu.

== Puranas ==
J.W. Wilkins states that the 'probable' origin of Kurma is as an incarnation of Prajapati (i.e. Brahma) in the Shatapatha Brahmana (7:5:1:5-7), but as 'the worship of Brahma became less popular, whilst that of Vishnu increased in its attraction, the names, attributes, and works of one deity seem to have been transferred to the other'.

Kurma as well as Varaha, the boar avatar of Vishnu, was both associated with the Creator Prajapati. Hermann Jacobi suggests that Prajapati may have worshipped in these animal forms. With Vishnu gaining the status of the Supreme God, the actions of Prajapati were transferred to Vishnu.

In post-Vedic literature, including the Puranas, Kurma is inextricably linked with the legend of the churning of the Ocean Of Milk, known as the Samudra Manthana. Kurma is also directly linked with Akupara, the so-called 'world-turtle' that supports the Earth, usually with Sesa.

The tale of Vishnu appearing as Kurma to support the sinking Mandara mountain is narrated in a chapter in the Agni Purana dedicated to Samudra Manthana. The narrative starts with the curse of sage Durvasa to the gods (devas), who lose to the asuras in battle and seek refuge in Vishnu. The asuras and the devas unite to churn the milk ocean, with Mount Mandara as the churning rod and Vasuki as the rope. Kurma appears to support the mountain. The poison Halahala appears from the ocean, Shiva drink it to save the world. After which, various divine objects emerge from the churning of the ocean, At the end god Dhanvantari appear carrying the bowl of Amrita. When the asuras steal the bowl, Vishnu assumes the form of the seductress Mohini and grabs it from the asuras and distributes it to the gods. Rahu assumes a form of a deva and drinks the amrita and is decapitated by Vishnu.

A similar narrative is also given in the Vishnu Purana; Vishnu is described to participate in the churning in many forms - Kurma as the base of the mount, in one form he sits on top of Mandara and in other forms, helps the gods and the demons pull the serpentine rope. The Brahmanda Purana states that Vishnu in the form of Brahma supports the mount; while as Narayana invigorated the gods. The Vayu Purana, the Padma Purana have similar narratives; the Bhagavata Purana also narrates the tale.

The Bhagavata Purana describes the form of Vishnu as Ajita, the son of Vairaja and Sambhuti, who assumed the form of the tortoise to rescue Mandara from drowning. He is further called the first tortoise. In another instance, it states that the ocean tides are a result of the breathing of Kurma, who had become drowsy due to the scratching of Mandara on his back.

Samudra Manthana is alluded briefly in the Kurma Purana, the Linga Purana, the Brahma Vaivarta Purana and the Shiva Purana.

Variations in these narratives alter the number and order of the divine articles appearing from the churning of the ocean. The number ranges from 9 to the popular list of 14. The common list includes the poison Halahala (Kalakuta), Varuni (Sura) - goddess of liquor, the divine horse Uchhaishravas, the gem Kaustubha, the goddess Lakshmi (Sri), the Apsaras, the cow of plenty Surabhi, the white elephant Airavata and Dhanvantari with the bowl of amrita (sometimes enumerated as two objects). Other objects include the umbrella of Varuna, earrings taken by Indra for his mother Aditi, the bow of Vishnu, Sharanga, the conch of Vishnu (Shankh), Nidra - the goddess of sloth, Alakshmi or Jyestha - the goddess of misfortune and the Parijatha plant.

In the Matsya Purana, Vishnu requests his form of world turtle Kurma, which supports all the worlds on his back, to help the gods in the churning of the ocean. Kurma is placed in Patala as the base of Mount Mandara. The Shiva Purana explicitly praises Vishnu as the world turtle who supports the Earth. The Brahma Vaivarta Purana states the serpent Shesha who supports the universe over his hoods, sits on Kurma, who lies in the wind or the waters.

The Vishnu Purana narrative of Vishnu's boar avatar Varaha alludes to the Matsya and Kurma avatars, saying that Brahma (identified with Narayana, an epithet transferred to Vishnu) took these forms in previous kalpas.

In the tale of the battle of the demon Bhandasura and the goddess Lalita in the Brahmanda Purana, When the demon created a flood using the Arnavastram, Lalita creates Kurma from the right index finger to shelter her goddess army who was drowning in the ocean

In the Agni Purana, the Shaligram stone for Kurma is described as black in colour with circular lines and an elevated hinder part.

Kurma is invoked in worship of Vishnu in various scriptures. The Brahma Purana salutes Kurma in a hymn as the "great tortoise", who "lifted the Earth and kept the mountain aloft". The Linga Purana, the Garuda Purana and the Shiva Purana similarly praises Vishnu as the one who kept the Mandara mountain aloft or the one who supported Mandara during the churning of the ocean as a tortoise.

The Agni Purana, the Markendeya Purana, the Vishnu Purana and the Brahma Purana state that Vishnu resides in Bharata (the Indian subcontinent) in the form of Kurma. TheMarkendeya Purana gives a detailed description of various lands of the region and constellations and zodiac stars corresponding to nine parts of the tortoise - mouth, four feet, tail, centre and two sides of its belly. The Bhagavata Purana states Vishnu stays as Kurma in the Himalayan continent (Hiraṇmaya-varsa).

The Kurma Purana is one of four Puranas that bear the names of Vishnu's avatars. The Purana is narrated by Kurma to the king Indradyumna and later to the sages and the gods at the time of Samudra Manthana. The detailed tale of the Samudra Manthana is absent from the Purana and alludes to Kurma as the one who supported Mount Mandara. The Kurma Purana is stated to be narrated by Kurma and is prescribed to be gifted with a golden statue of a tortoise in the Agni Purana.

The Agni Purana prescribes that Kurma be depicted in zoomorphic form as a tortoise.

In the narrative of the battle between Shiva's manifestation Virabhadra and Vishnu's avatar Narasimha of the Linga Purana and the Shiva Purana, Virabhadra mocks Narasimha-Vishnu stating that Kurma's skull adorns the necklace of Shiva.

In the Vishnu Purana and the Markendeya Purana in a context mentioning Varaha, Brahma - identified with Narayana - decides to take the form of the boar Varaha, similar to the forms of the fish (Matsya) and tortoise (Kurma), he took in previous kalpas.

The Linga Purana, the Varaha Purana and the Shiva Purana mention Kurma as second in its Dashavatara listing.

The Varaha Purana recommends a vrata (vow) with fasting and worshipping Kurma-Vishnu in a three lunar-day festival culminating on the twelfth lunar day in the bright half of the Pausha month. The first day of the vrata is said to be the day when Vishnu assumed the Kurma form in Samudra manthana.

The Bhagavata Purana lists Kurma the eleventh avatar of Vishnu in the list of 24 avatars. The Garuda Purana lists him as the eleventh of 20 avatars, elsewhere he is mentioned as the second of the Dashavatara.

The Vishnu Sahasranama version from the Garuda Purana mentions Kurma as an epithet of Vishnu. The Garuda Purana addresses Kurma in hymns to Vishnu. He is associated with the south-western direction.

=== Narada Purana ===
Narada	References	Notes
Narada	Part 1: 2.37, 10.3-4; Part 2: 44.26b-28a, 50.89-91, 54.11, 56.739b-745, 59.36, 62.53; Part 3: 82.6-7, 89; Part 4: 119.14-19, Uttara Bhaga: 8.7-11; Part 5: Uttara Bhaga: 52.29b-35, 68.4	The Narada Purana focuses on worship and rituals.

It was this [Mandara] mountain that was formerly lifted up by Hari (in the form of [the] Divine Tortoise) and used for churning (the milk ocean) by the Devas and Danavas. Sindhu (the ocean) which extends to six hundred thousand Yojanas is the deep pit made by this mountain. This great mountain was not broken even when it rubbed against the physical body of the Divine Tortoise. O leading king, when it fell into the ocean all the hidden parts of the ocean were exposed by the mountain. O Brahmanas, water gushed out from this mountain [and] went up through the path of the Brahmanda (Cosmic Egg). Great fire was generated by this mountain due to attrition when it came into contact with the bony shell of the (Divine) Tortoise... It was for a great period of time viz. ten thousand years than this mountain ground and rubbed the armlets of the discus-bearing Lord.

— Narada Purana (unknown translator), Part 4, Uttara Bhaga, Chapter 8, Verses 7-8 and 11

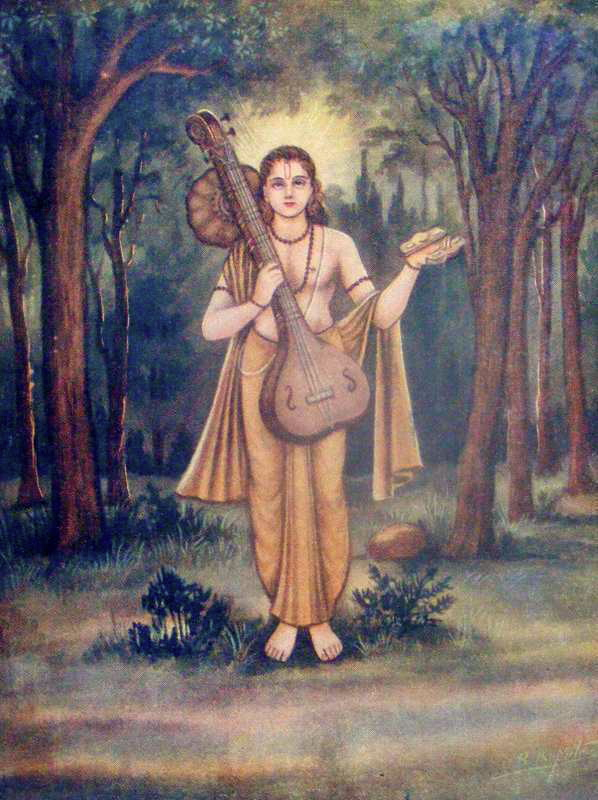
Narada with his Veena (or Vina).

In the Narada Purana, a brief synopsis of the Samudra Manthana is given by Brahma to Mohini, as quoted above (Part 4: 8.7-11). There are two other notable mentions of this legend. The first is by Saunaka who said 'When there was an impediment at the time of churning the ocean for the sake of nectar, he [Kurma] held the mount Mandara on his back, for the welfare of the gods. I seek refuge in that Tortoise' (Part 1: 2.37). In the second, it is stated 'it was when the milk-ocean was churning that Kamoda was born among the four jewels of Virgins' (Part 5: Uttara Bhaga: 68.4). Other details include:

- Several allegories of the tortoise drawing in its limbs are given, including in relation to the creation and withdrawal of living beings (Part 2: 44.26b-28a) and withdrawing the sense organs (Part 2: 50.89-91, and 59.36)
- The division of the Earth - Kurma-vibhaga - is in relation to the Jyotisa, an auxiliary text of the Vedas (Part 2: 54.11 and 56.739b-745)
- Kurma is one of the ten primary avatars (Dashavatara) of Vishnu (Part 4: 119.14-19)

=== Padma Purana ===
Padma	References	Notes
Padma	Part 1: 3.25b-29, 4, 5.81-87, 13.146b, 13.180, 13.186, 14.22-27; Part 2: 41.38-44a, 47.77-78, 47.85, b-8649.120-122a, 53.3, 75.90; Part 5: 8–10; Part 6: 78.28-43; Part 7: 5.12-20, 30.11-15, 66.44-54, 71.23-29b, 71.169-188, 71.244-264, 78.16-29; Part 8: 97.6b-8, 120.51b-73; Part 9: 228.19-24, 229.40-44, 230.3-11, 231–232, 237.15-19; Part 10: 6.175-190, 11.80-89, 11.92b-101, 17.103-117	No notable mentions in parts 3 or 4

Visnu himself, remaining in the ocean in the form of a tortoise, nourished the gods with unusual lustre... the goddess Varuni became (manifest), Her eyes were rolling about due to intoxication... [she said:] "I am a goddess giving strength. The demons may take me". Regarding Varuni as impure, the gods let her go. Then the demons took her. She became wine after being taken (by them)... Then the deadly poison (came up). By it all gods and demons with (other) deities were afflicted. Mahadeva [Shiva] took and drank that poison at his will. Due to drinking it Mahadeva had his throat turned dark blue. The Nagas drank the remaining poison that had come up from the White [Milky] Ocean.

— Padma Purana (translated by N.A. Deshpande, 1988), Part 1, Chapter 4, Verses 41-56

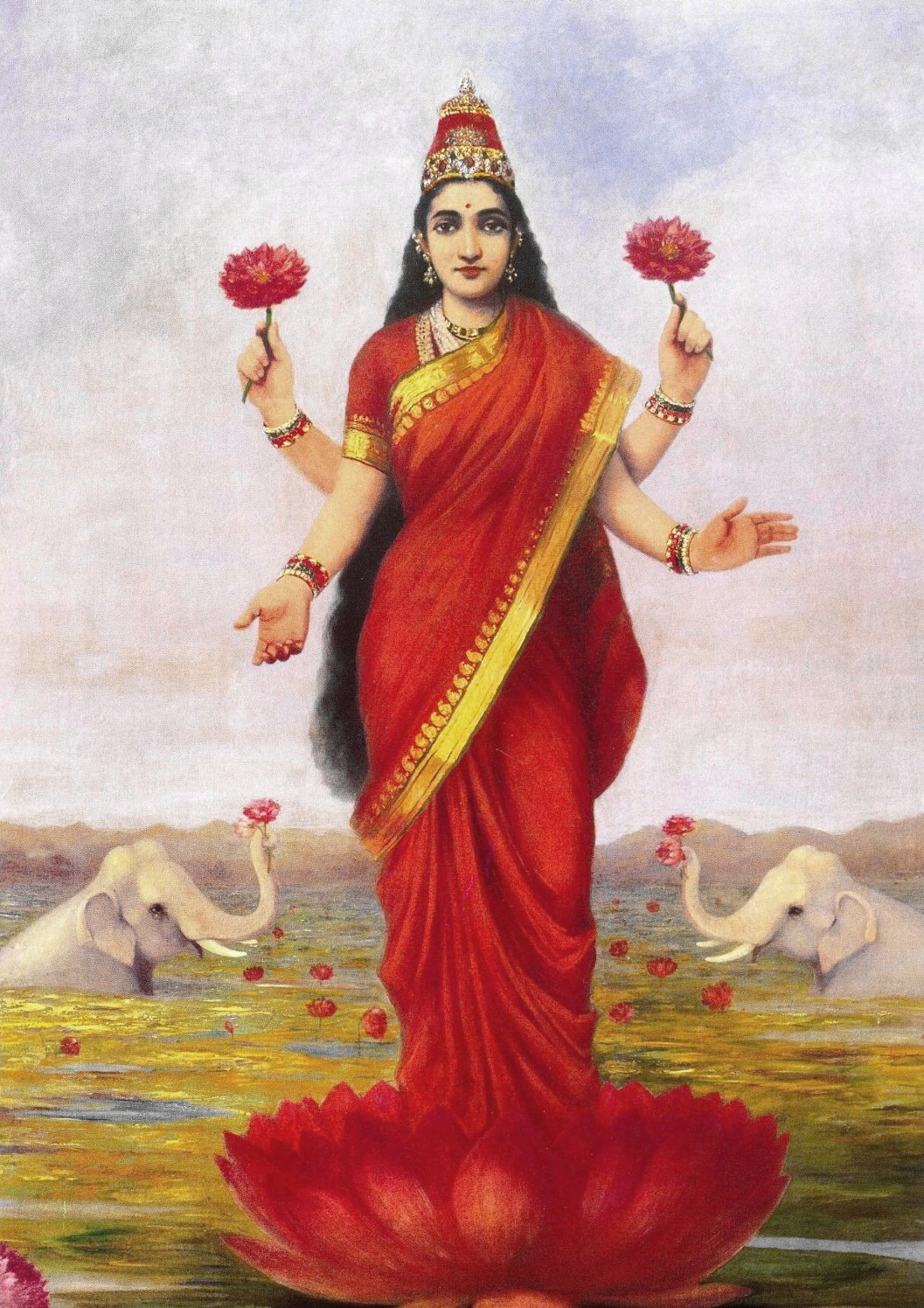
The Goddess Lakshmi, consort of Vishnu also known as 'Sri'.

In the Padma Purana three accounts of the Samudra Manthana are given, all beginning with Indra being cursed by Durvasas for arrogance. In the first, narrated by Pulastya, as a result of the curse the 'three worlds, along with Indra, were void of affluence... [and] the Daityas (sons of Diti) and Danavas (sons of Danu) started military operations against [the] gods', forcing them to seek refuge with Vishnu. Vasuki is used as a rope to churn the ocean. Notably, during the churning, Varuni (Goddess of Wine) is upon emerging rejected by the gods and accepted by the asuras, the opposite of the account given in the Brahmanda Purana (to explain the meaning of 'Asura'). Unnamed poison also emerges which is drunk by Shiva, before the emergence of Dhanvantari with the nectar of immortality (Amrita) as well as Lakshmi. Although the asuras take the nectar, Vishnu assumes the form of Mohini to trick them and give it to the gods. The asuras are destroyed, with the Danavas since then becoming 'eager for (the company of) ladies' (Part 1: 4).

O gods, Indira (i.e. Laksmi), due to whose mere glance the world is endowed with glory, has vanished due to the curse of the Brahmana (viz. Durvasas). Then, O gods, all of you, along with the demons, having uprooted the golden mountain Mandara and making it, with the king of serpents going round it, the churning-rod, churn the milky ocean. O gods, from it Laksmi, the mother of the world will spring up. O glorious ones, there is no doubt that because of her you will be delighted. I myself, in the form of a tortoise, shall fully hold the (Mandara) mountain (on my back).

— Padma Purana (translated by N.A. Deshpande, 1988), Part 5, Chapter 8, Verses 19b-23

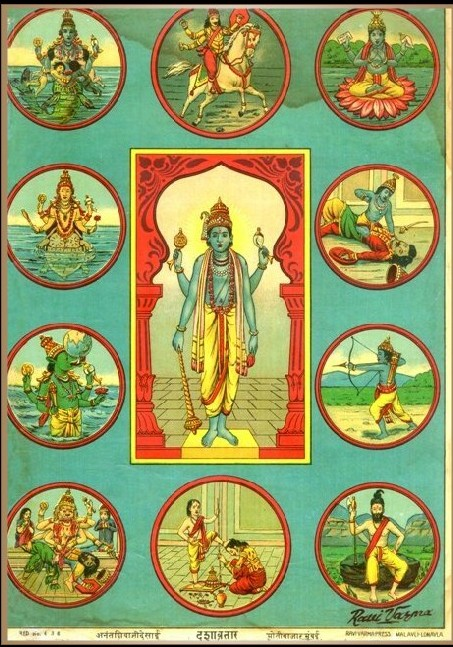
the Dashavatara, or ten principle avatars of Vishnu.

In the second account, narrated by Suta, as a result of the curse the 'mother of the worlds' (Lakshmi) disappears, and the world is ruined by drought and famine, forcing the gods - oppressed by hunger and thirst - to seek refuge with Vishnu at the shore of the Milky Ocean (Part 5: 8). Ananta (Vasuki in the first account) is used as a churning rope. On Ekadashi day, the poison Kalakuta emerges, which is swallowed by Shiva 'meditating upon Vishnu in his heart'. An evil being called Alaksmi (i.e. a-Laksmi or 'not Laksmi') them emerges and is told to reside in places such as where there is quarrel, gambling, adultery, theft, and so forth (Part 5: 9). The churning continues and auspicious beings and items emerge, including 'the brother of Laksmi, [who] sprang up with nectar. (So also) Tulasi [i.e. Lakshmi], Visnu's wife'. On this occasion, Vishnu assumes the form of Mohini merely to distribute the nectar amongst the gods, without mention of tricking the asuras (Part 5: 10).

The third account, narrated by Shiva, is very similar to the others except with a far greater emphasis on Lakshmi, and although the poison Kalakuta emerges and is swallowed by Shiva, there is no mention of Alaksmi or the Mohini avatar (Part 9: 231–232). The Naga used as a rope for churning is referred to as 'the Lord of the Serpents' (likely Ananta). Other details include:

- Kurma is mentioned as an avatar of Vishnu (Part 1: 3.25b-29), as a giver of boons (Part 1: 5.81-87), and is stated to have appeared during the fourth war between the devas and asuras (Part 1: 13.180); during the churning, Indra is stated to have vanquished Prahlada (Part 1: 13.186)
- Relating to Kurma as the world-turtle, it is stated 'Due to truth (alone), the sun rises; also the wind blows; the ocean would (i.e. does) not cross its boundary nor would (i.e. does) the Tortoise avert (sustaining) the earth' (Part 2: 53.3); Kurma is also mentioned as the 'first tortoise', the prop of everything, cause of production of ambrosia, and the support of the Earth (Part 7: 71.169-188); finally, after raising the earth from the waters in the form of a boar (Varaha), it is stated that Vishnu placed it on the head of Sesa before taking the form of Kurma (Part 9: 237.15-19)
- Kurma is named as one of the 10 primary avatars (Dashavatara) of Vishnu by Yama (Part 7: 66.44-54), Brahma (Part 7: 71.23-29b), and Shiva (Part 9: 229.40-44)
- The salagrama of Kurma is described as 'raised, round on the surface, and is filled with a disc (like figure). Marked with Kaustubha, it has a green colour' (Part 8: 20.51b-73)
- Kurma is stated to reside in Vaikuntha (Part 9: 228.19-24); and is one of the 108 names of Vishnu (Part 10: 17.103-117)
- Shiva gives salutations to Kurma, who 'extracted the Earth along with mountains, forests and groves, from inside the water of the deep ocean' (Part 10: 6.175-190)

=== Skanda Purana ===
Skanda	References	Notes
Skanda	Part 1: 8.89, 9–12; Part 2: 47.12-15; Part 3: Uttarardha: 11.8-11; Part 4: Venkatacala Mahatmya: 11, 20.81, 36.20-26; Part 5: Purusottama-Ksetra Mahatmya: 15.30, 22.32-43; Part 6: Margasirsa Mahatmya: 3.23-29; Part 7: Vasudeva-Mamatmya: 9–14, 18.12-20, 27.32-33; Part 8: Setu Mahatmya: 3.81-82, 37.15-20, 46.31-36; Part 9: Dharmaranya Khanda: 19.16, 20.20-23; Part 10: Purvardha: 8.100, 29.17-168, 32.69-71, 41.102, 50; Part 11: Uttarardha: 51, 70.69; Part 12: Avantiksetra Mahatmya: 42.12-14, 44 63.83; Part 14: Reva Khanda: 7; Part 15: Reva Khanda: 151.1-17, 181.56-65, 182.1-22; Part 17: Nagara Khanda: 144.117; Part 18: Nagara Khanda: 210, 262.21-22, 271.245-455; Part 19: Prabhasa-Ksetra Mahatmya: 7.17-37, 11.18, 32.100-103a, 81.23-24; Part 20: Prabhasa Khanda: 167.33, 199.11-12	Nothing notable in parts 13 or 16. Part 15 relates that Hamsa, one of Kasyapa's sons, became the mount of Brahma (221.1-6)

As the Ocean of Milk was being churned, the mountain sank deep into Rasatala. At that very instant, the Lord of Rama, Visnu, became a tortoise and lifted it up. That was something really marvellous... The excellent mountain had adamantine strength. It rolled on the back, neck, thighs, and space between the knees of the noble-souled tortoise. Due to the friction of these two, submarine [i.e. underwater] fire was generated.

— Skanda Purana (Unknown translator, 1951), Part 1, Chapter 9, Verses 86 and 91

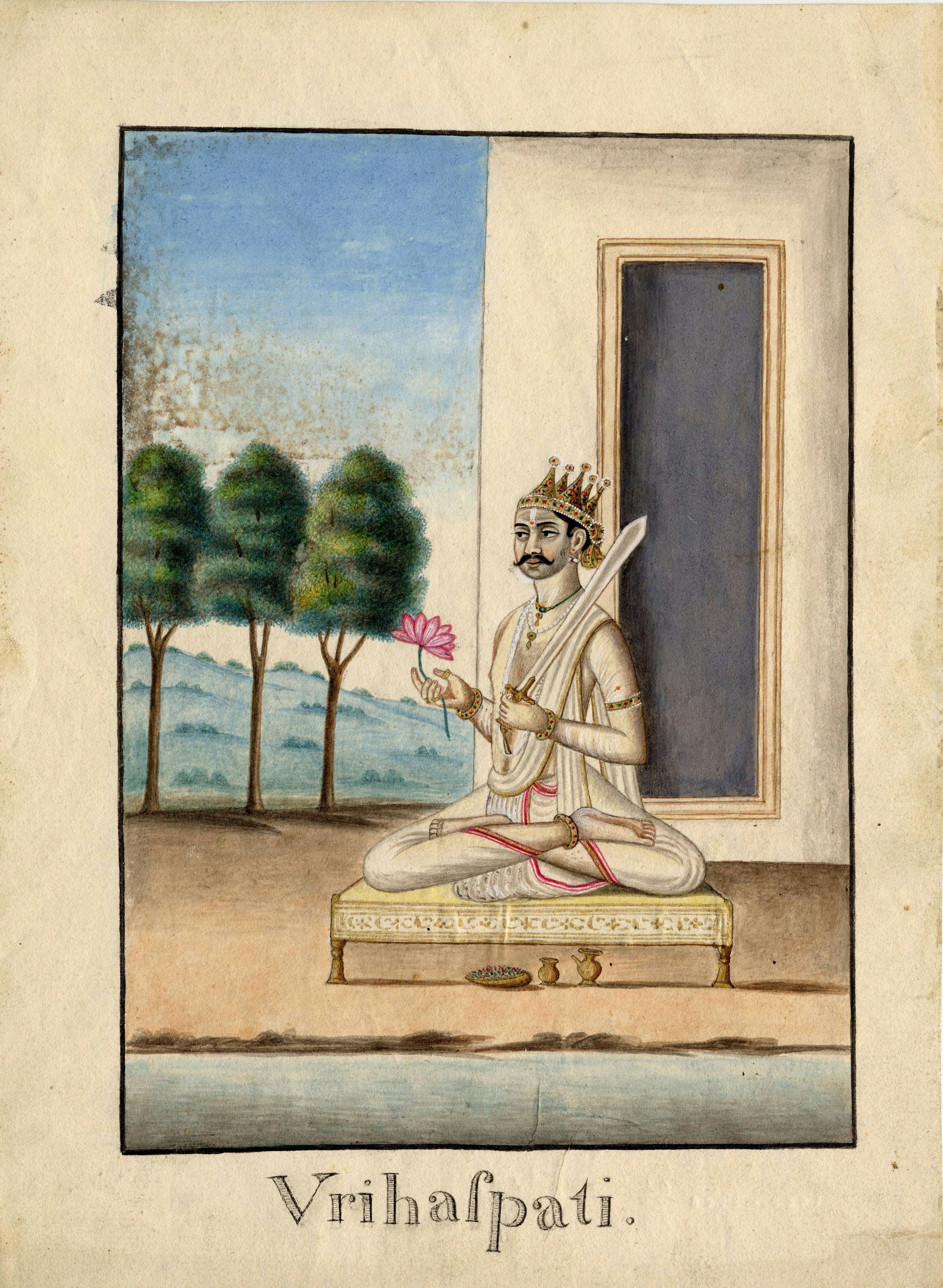
The sage Bṛhaspati, who curses Indra in some accounts of the Samudra Manthana.

In the Skanda Purana four accounts of the Samudra Manthana are given. In the first, the churning of the ocean of Milk takes place after Indra is cursed by the sage Brhaspati, resulting in the disappearance of Lakshmi, misery to all, and ruin of the devas, defeated in battle by the asuras who take their precious items such as gems to Patala. On the advice of Brahma, Indra and the devas make a pact with Bali, leader of asuras, to recover the gems from the Ocean of Milk. Unable to move the Mandara mountain to use as a churning rod, Vishnu is asked for help, who arrives on Garuda, takes the mountain to the ocean, and incarnates as Kurma. Vasuki is used as the churning rope. The Kalakuta poison generated envelopes the devas and Daityas - causing ignorance and lust - before enveloping all existence (including Vaikuntha) and reducing the cosmic egg to ash (Part 1: 9). Shiva is approached for refuge, and the origin and need to worship Ganesha to 'achieve success in undertaking' is explained before Shiva drinks the poison (Part 1: 10). More information on Ganesha-worship is given before the churning resumes, producing many auspicious items and beings, including Lakshmi (Part 1: 11). Dhanvantari emerges with the nectar of immortality (Amrita), which is taken by the asuras. Vishnu incarnates as Mohini, and despite warning Bali that 'Women should never be trusted by a wise man' is still given the nectar which She gives to the devas (Part 1: 12).

In the second account, Indra is again cursed by the sage Brhaspati (Part 7: 8), resulting in the disappearance of Laksmi, and with her, an absence of 'Penance, Purity, Mercy, Truth... True Dharma, Prosperity... Strength [and] Sattva (quality of goodness)'. Hunger, poverty, anger, lust, flesh-eating, and perverse-thinking abound, including belief that adharma is dharma, and perverse interpretations of the Vedas to justify killing animals (Part 7: 9). Vishnu is approached for refuge by the devas and instructs them to churn the Ocean of Milk (Part 7: 10). Indra forms a pact with the asuras, Sesa is used as a churning rope with the Mandara Mountain, and Vishnu incarnates as Kurma as the base. After a thousand years of churning the poison Halahala is generated and swallowed by Shiva; the drops that fell are taken by serpents, scorpions, and some medicinal plants (Part 7: 11). The churning continues for another thousand years, producing auspicious items and beings, including Laksmi (Part 7: 12). Dhanvantari emerges with the pitcher of Amrita which is taken by the asuras, and Vishnu assumes 'a marvellously beautiful feminine form that enchanted all the world' (Mohini). Despite warning the asuras not to trust her, Mohini is given the Amrita which is handed to the devas before the asuras are destroyed in battle (Part 7: 13).

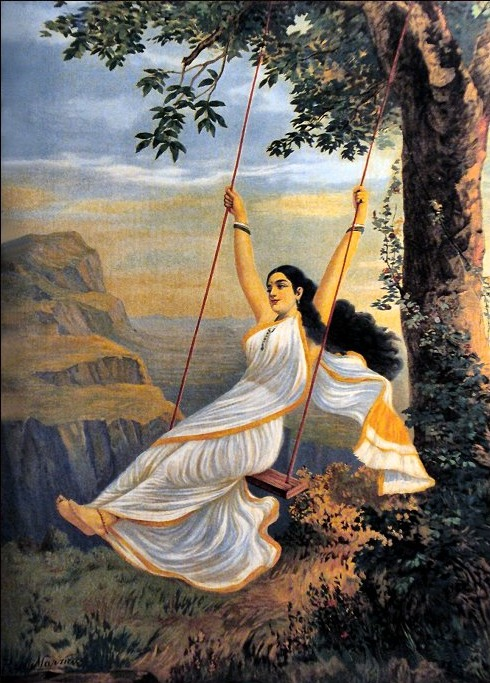
Mohini, the female enchantress avatar of Vishnu.

In the third brief account, the churning takes place after 'a great loss of gems due to wicked souls' and the loss of righteousness. Vasuki is used as the churning cord as the devas and asuras 'placed the main plant of activity on the back of the (divine) tortoise and churned out the precious gems'. Many auspicious items and beings are generated, including Sura (alcohol; in other accounts Varuni) and Dhanvantari. Quarreling ensues between the devas and asuras, and Vishnu incarnates as 'the fascinating form of a woman' (Mohini) to beguile the demons as Indra gives them the Sura and via 'sleight of hand' takes the Amrita. Halahala poison is also generated which is consumed by Shiva (Part 12: 44).

In the fourth account, the legend is briefly retold by Visvamitra. The details are much the same as the previous accounts, with Vasuki as the cord as the 'Kacchapa (Tortoise incarnation of Visnu) held up (the mountain)', including the Kalakuta poison drunk by Shiva and the incarnation of Mohini to trick the asuras. The notable exception is that the churning first produces a 'hideous' family of three of Ratnas (jewels); rejected by both the devas and Danavas, they are accepted by Ka (i.e. Brahma; Part 18: 210).

Notably, reminiscent the account of Prajapati and the Tortoise in the Taittiriya Aranyaka (see above), there is also an account, during the time of the universal dissolution, when Brahma 'assumed the form of a Khadyota (Firefly, Glow-worm)' and moved about for a thousand divine years before finding 'the Lord [Vishnu] asleep in the form of a tortoise'. Woken by Brahma, Vishnu 'got up ejecting the three worlds that had been swallowed at the time of the close of the [previous] Kalpa' with all creation - including the devas, Danavas, moon, sun, and planets - being generated from and by Him. Vishnu also sees the Earth 'was in the great ocean perched on the back of the tortoise' (Part 14: Reva Khanda: 7). Other details include:

- Kurma is mentioned to have held the Mandara Mountain (Part 1: 8.89);
- After being resorted to by Tara and 'Permeated by her, Kurma, the sire of the universe, lifted up the Vedas' (Part 2: 47.12-15)
- Exploring the Linga of Shiva, 'The primordial Tortoise that was stationed as the bulbous root of the Golden Mountain as well as its support was seen by Acyuta [Vishnu]'; It is also by Shiva's blessing that Sesa, Kurma, and others are capable of bearing the burden of that Linga (Part 3: Uttarardha: 11.8-11)
- After Varaha lifted the earth out of the waters, Vishnu 'placed the Elephants of the Quarters, the King of Serpents and the Tortoise for giving her extra support. That receptacle of Mercy (Hari) willingly applied his own Sakti (power) in an unmanifest form as a support for them all' (Part 4: Venkatacala Mahatmya: 36.20-26); Bhrgu also states Kurma supports the earth (Part 15: Reva-Khanda: 182.1-22); and Sesa and Kurma are also later stated to stabilise the Earth (Part 17: Nagara Khanda: 144.117)
- Kurma is mentioned where Vishnu is stated to be the annihilator in the form of Rudra (Part 5: Purusottama-Ksetra Mahatmya: 22.32-43)
- Kurma is named as one of 12 incarnations of Vishnu, who states to Brahma:

When the sons of Kasyapa (i.e. Devas and Asuras) will churn the ocean for (obtaining) nectar, I [Vishnu], assuming the form of a tortoise, will bear on my back Mount Mandara used as the churning rod.

— Skanda Purana (Unknown translator, 1951), Part 7, Chapter 18, Verses 12-20

- In the procedure for Puja Mandala construction, Matsya and Kurma should be installed in the South-West and depicted as animals below the waist but in human form above (Part 7: Vasudeva-Mamatmya: 27.32-33)
- It is stated that the Linga of Shiva evolved from 'the back of a tortoise (shell)' (Part 9: Dharmaranya Khanda: 19.16) and that 'The Bija [origin] of Vahni (Fire) is accompanied by (the seed of) Vata (Wind) and the Bija of Kurma (tortoise)' (Part 9: Dharmaranya Khanda: 20.20-23)
- It is stated that 'Like a tortoise that withdraws all its limbs, he who withdraws the sense-organs though the proper procedure of Pratyahara shall become free from sins' (Part 10: Purvardha: 41.102)
- Kumari - the Shakti of Kurma - has a noose in her hand and is located to the south of Mahalaksmi (Part 11: Uttarardha: 70.69)
- 'Kurma' is one of the thousand names (Vishnu Sahasranama) of Vishnu (Part 12: Avantiksetra Mahatmya: 63.83)
- Kurma is listed in the Dashavatara, or ten primary incarnations of Vishnu (Part 15: Reva-Khanda, 151.1-7)
- Bhrgu refers to a Ksetra (temple) that stands on Kaccapa (i.e. a tortoise) and states there will be a city named after Him, Bhrgukaccha (Part 15: Reva-Khanda: 182.1-22)
- The star constellations in the form of Kurma (i.e. the tortoise) are discussed, where it is also stated Kurma is stationed in Bharata and faces the east (Part 19: Prabhasa-Ksetra Mahatmya: 7.17-37 and 11.18)
- A Holy spot called Prabhasa in Bharata is located to the south-west of the shrine of Kurma (Part 20: Prabhasa Khanda: 167.33)

== Temples ==
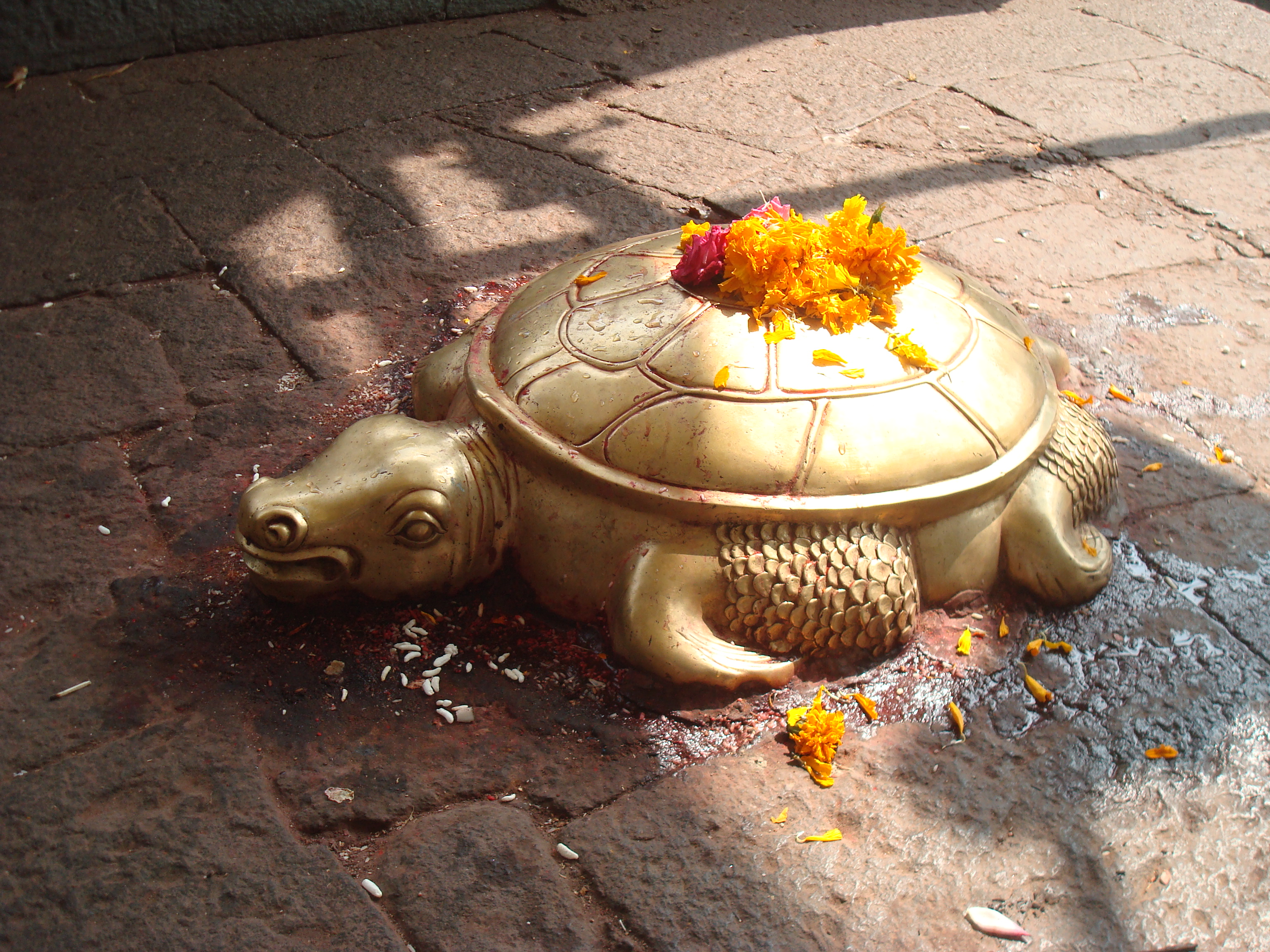
Kurma avatar at Saptashrungi of Shaktism

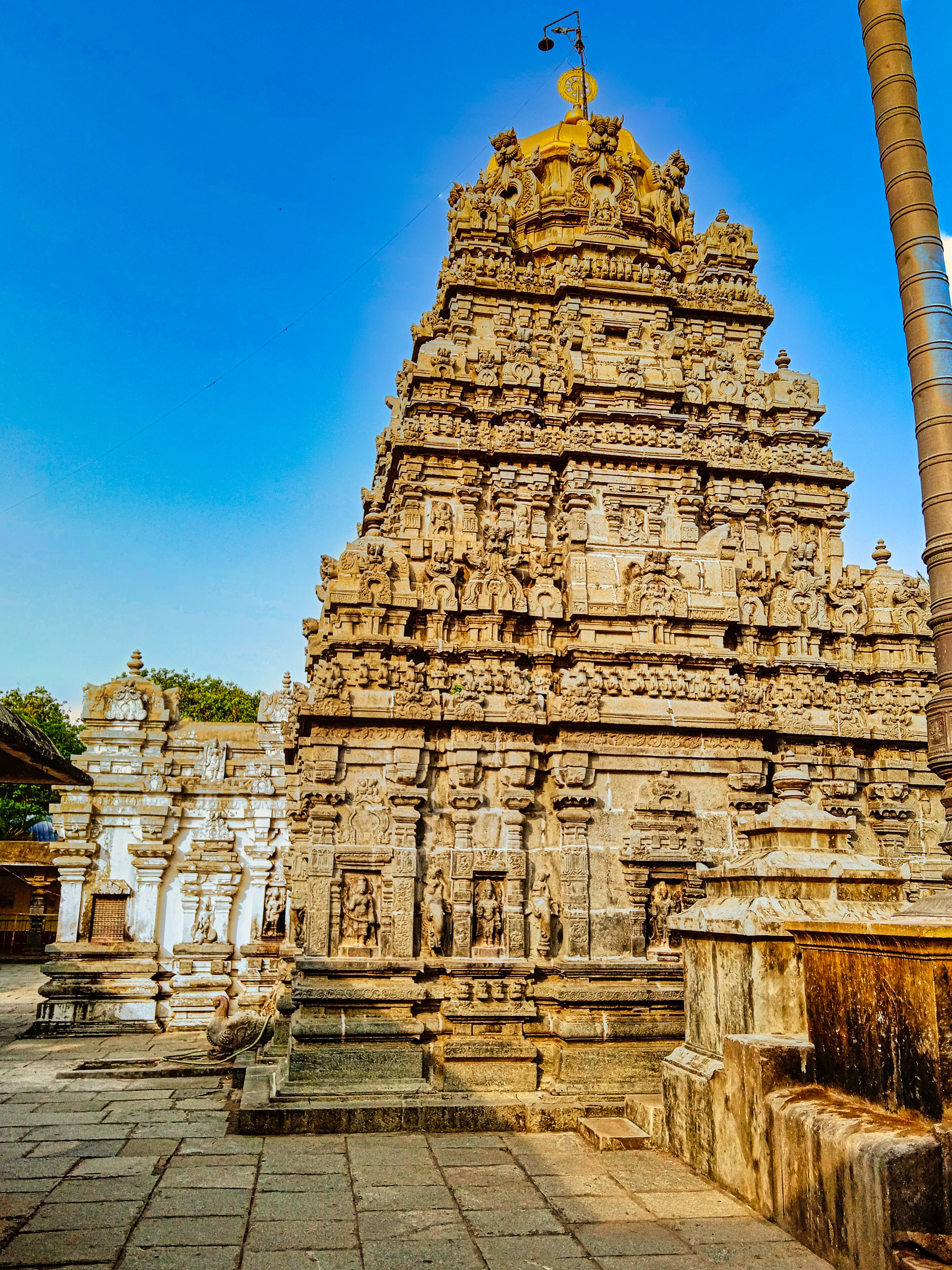
Srikurmam temple, Srikakulam

=== Iconography ===
The Samudra Manthana is popular in iconography and even found in South East Asia. Notable depictions include the relief at Angkor Wat with Vishnu and Kurma in the centre and the gods and demons on either side churning the ocean. The earth below the temple represents Kurma in Khymer iconography, the earth goddess being Vishnu's consort. The Vishnu on the top of Mandara symbolizes him as the shining midday Sun.

Kurma is depicted either zoomorphically as a tortoise.

In the anthropomorphic form, the upper half is that of the four-armed man and the lower half is a fish. The upper half resembles Vishnu and wears the traditional ornaments and the kirita-mukuta (tall conical crown) as worn by Vishnu. He holds in two of his hands the Sudarshana chakra (discus) and a shankha (conch), the usual weapons of Vishnu. The other two hands make the gestures of varadamudra, which grants boons to the devotee, and abhayamudra, which reassures the devotee of protection. The depiction is similar to Matsya, where the lower half is a fish.

=== Locations ===
Srikurmam was initially a Shiva temple, which was converted into a Vaishnava one by the Vaishnava saint Ramanuja. The sanctum has an icon of Vishnu, as well as of Kurma with the tail and back to the devotee and face to the west. This is in contradiction to scriptural mandate that the central icon should face the east. According to a legend, the Kurma icon turned to the west back wall in honour of a tribal Bhil king who worshipped him from the back of the temple. Nanditha Krishna suggests that a tribal tortoise god could have been assimilated in the Hindu fold by identifying him with Kurma.

There are five temples dedicated to this incarnation of Vishnu in India:

- Kurmai (Chittoor District of Andhra Pradesh)
- Sri Kurmam (Srikakulam District of Andhra Pradesh)
- Gavirangapura (Chitradurga District of Karnataka)
- Swarupnarayan (Goghat village in Hooghly district of West Bengal).

The name of the village mentioned above originates from the historical temple of Kurma called Varadarajaswamy (Kurma avatara of Vishnu), regarding the deity of this village.

- Amamangalam Maha Vishnu Temple (Kakkur, Calicut District, Kerala) - The presiding deity is called Kurmavataram. Local legends consider to be one of the major temples dedicated to the Dashavatara consecrated by Parashurama himself.
- Subsidiary shrine at Garuda Temple, Triprangode, Malappuram, Kerala
- Subsidiary shrine at Shree Adukkath Bhagavathy Temple, Kasargode, Kerala

== Other uses ==
M. Vettam notes that there are ten Vayus (Winds) in the body, one of which is called 'Kurma' in regards to opening and closing the eyes.

The 'kurma-Nadi' (or Kūrmanāḍī, Sanskrit कूर्मनाडी), meaning 'Tortoise-Nerve' or 'Canal Of The Tortoise', is in relation to steadying the mind (slowing down thoughts) in Yogic practice. 'Nadi' itself means 'Vein', 'Artery', 'River', or 'Any Tubular Organ Of The Body' (as well as 'Flute'). Although the Kurmanaḍi is generally stated to be located in the upper chest below the throat, S. Lele believes this refers to the Muladhara Chakra, located near the Tailbone, based on the root-word 'Nal' (Sanskrit नल्), meaning 'to Bind'.

These are all mentioned in the Upanishads and Puranas.

== See also ==
- Cultural depictions of turtles
- Dashavatara - the ten avatars of Vishnu, including Kurma
- Kashyapa – a Vedic sage whose name also means "tortoise, turtle"
- Kurmasana - yoga pose dedicated to Kurma
- Samudra Manthana - myth of the churning of the ocean by Kurma
- World Turtle - the giant turtle who supports the earth
