= Kurmanathaswamy temple, Srikurmam =

Hindu temple in Andhra Pradesh

Kurmanathaswamy Temple
- Srikurmam Temple
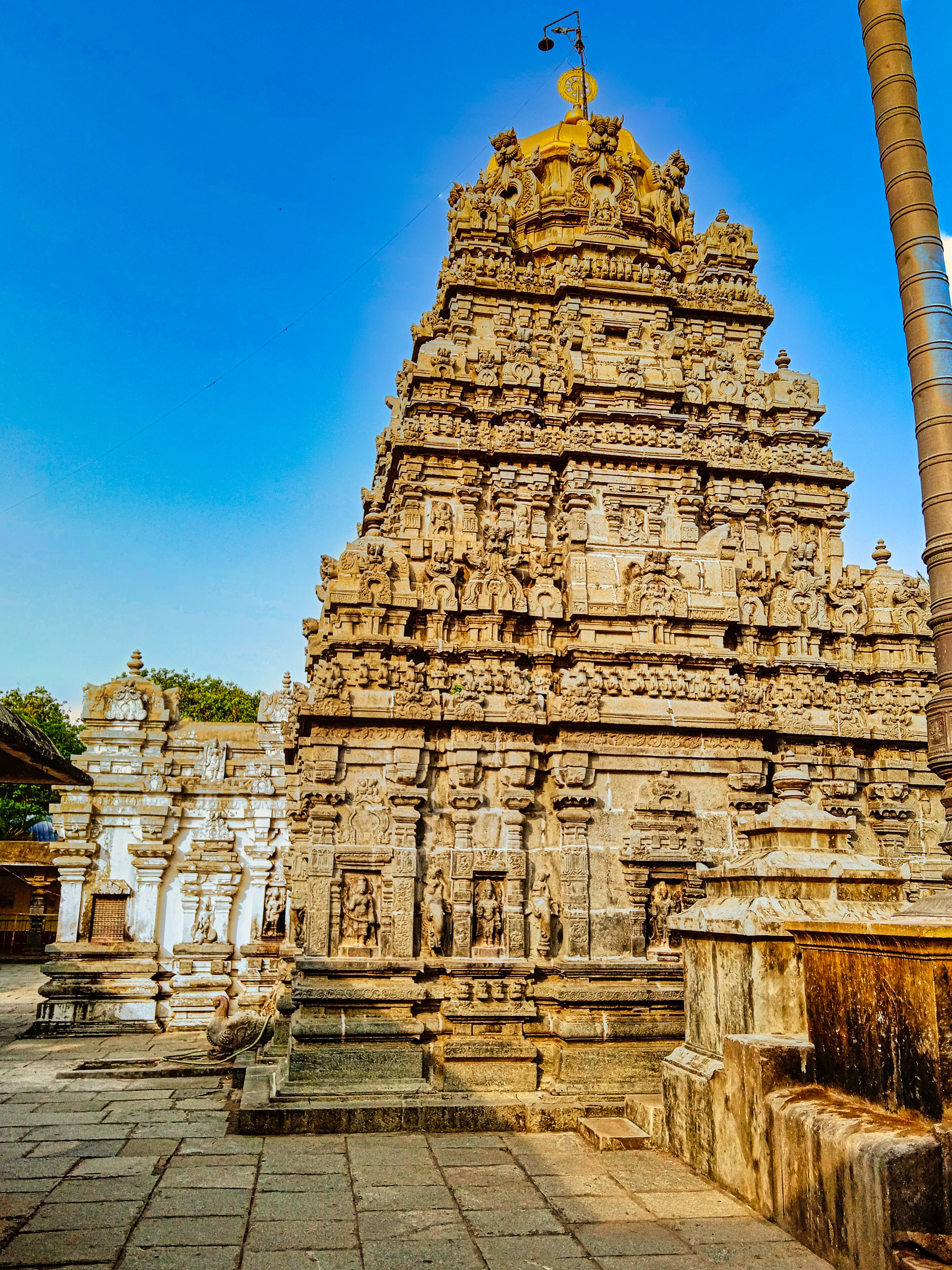
- The vimana of the main temple

Religion
- Affiliation: Hinduism
- District: Srikakulam district
- Deity: Kurmanathaswamy (Vishnu); Kurmanayaki (Lakshmi)

Location
- Location: Sri Kurmam
- State: Andhra Pradesh
- Country: India
- Interactive map of Kurmanathaswamy Temple
- Coordinates: 18.2700°N 84.0066°E

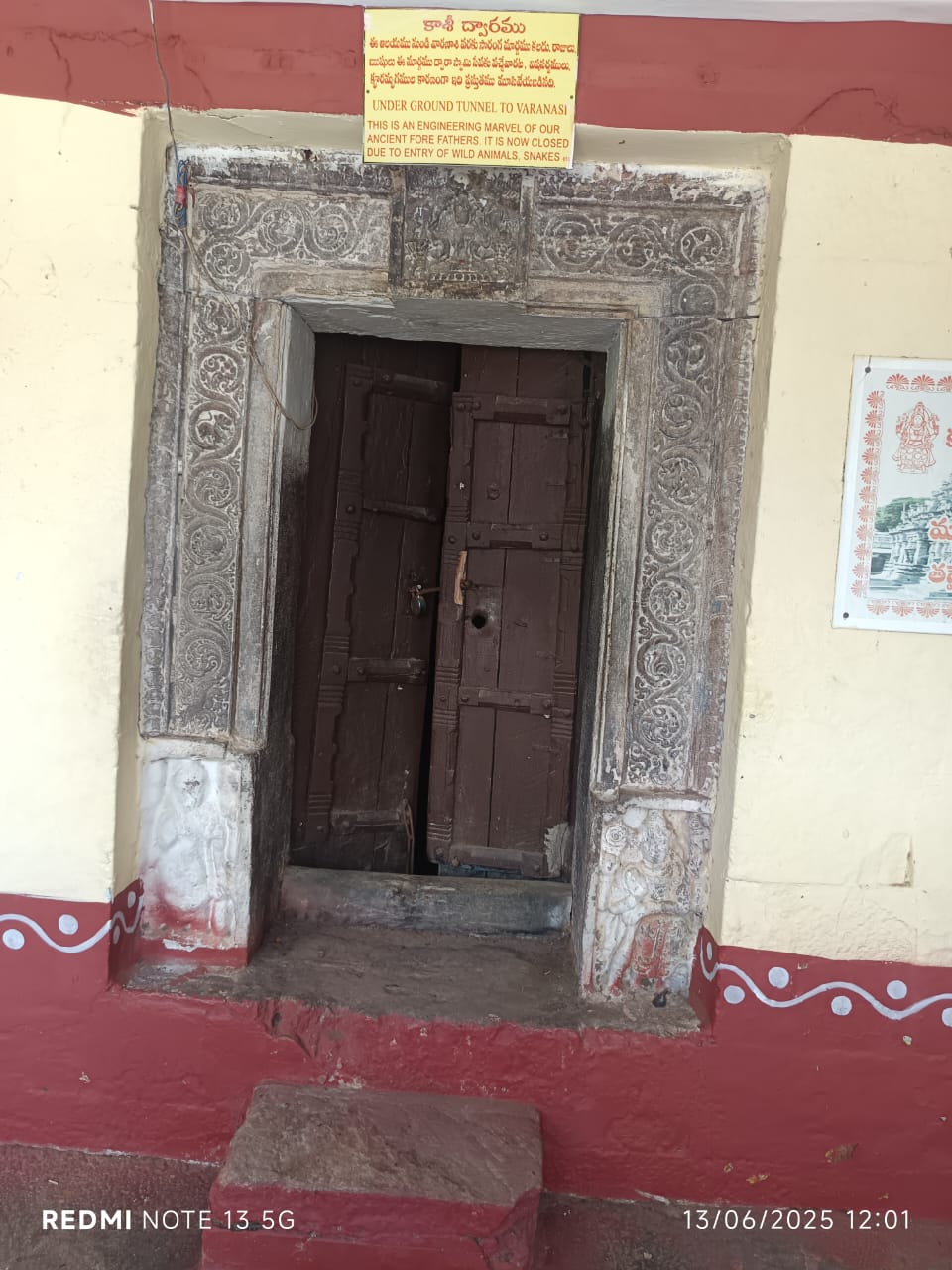
Underground tunnel to Varanasi

The Kurmanathaswamy temple, also known as the Kurmanatha temple, Srikurma or Srikurmam temple, is a Hindu temple dedicated to Kurma – the second avatar of Vishnu. It is located in Srikurmam village, Srikakulam district in Andhra Pradesh, India. According to Prapannamrutam and earliest inscription of the temple, In saka 1035 CE Anantavarman Chodaganga Deva of Eastern Ganga Dynasty of Odisha converted this temple to a Vaishnava khetra from a Siva temple.The temple was Built before 11th-century CE in a fusion architecture of kalinga Architecture and Dravidian Architecture. The temple's perambulatory were constructed by Eastern Ganga Dynasty king Anangabhima Deva III, and it is dedicated to Vishnu as Kurmanathaswamy and his consort Lakshmi as Kurmanayaki. The temple has century old Orissan Pattachitra style mural paintings in side wall of pradakshina mandapa.

Srikurmam is the only known pre-14th-century Indian temple that is dedicated to the Kurma avatar. The sanctum of Kurmanatha temple has both a tortoise image and the anthropomorphic Vishnu with Lakshmi. The temple was an important centre of Vaishnavism in the medieval period along with Simhachalam. Later Naraharitirtha, a disciple of Madhvacharya, was instrumental in making Srikurmam the seat of Vishnavite religious activities. The temple has two dhvajasthambas, 108 ekasila (single-stone) pillars, with none resembling each other. These bear numerous inscriptions. A tortoise park has been built within the temple to honor and conserve the adult and young star tortoises. The temple has primarily Vaishnava iconography and murals, but also reverentially includes Shaiva (Ganesha, Shiva) and Shakti (Lakshmi, Durga) icons.

Srikurmam follows both Shaivite and Vaishnavite traditions of worship. Four daily rituals and four annual festivals are celebrated in Srikurmam, out of which the three-day Dolotsavam is the major one. Gajapathi Rajus of Vizianagaram are the trustees of the temple, which is maintained and administered by the Hindu Religious and Endowment Board of the Government of Andhra Pradesh. The Indian postal department issued a stamp featuring the temple on 11 April 2013.

== History ==
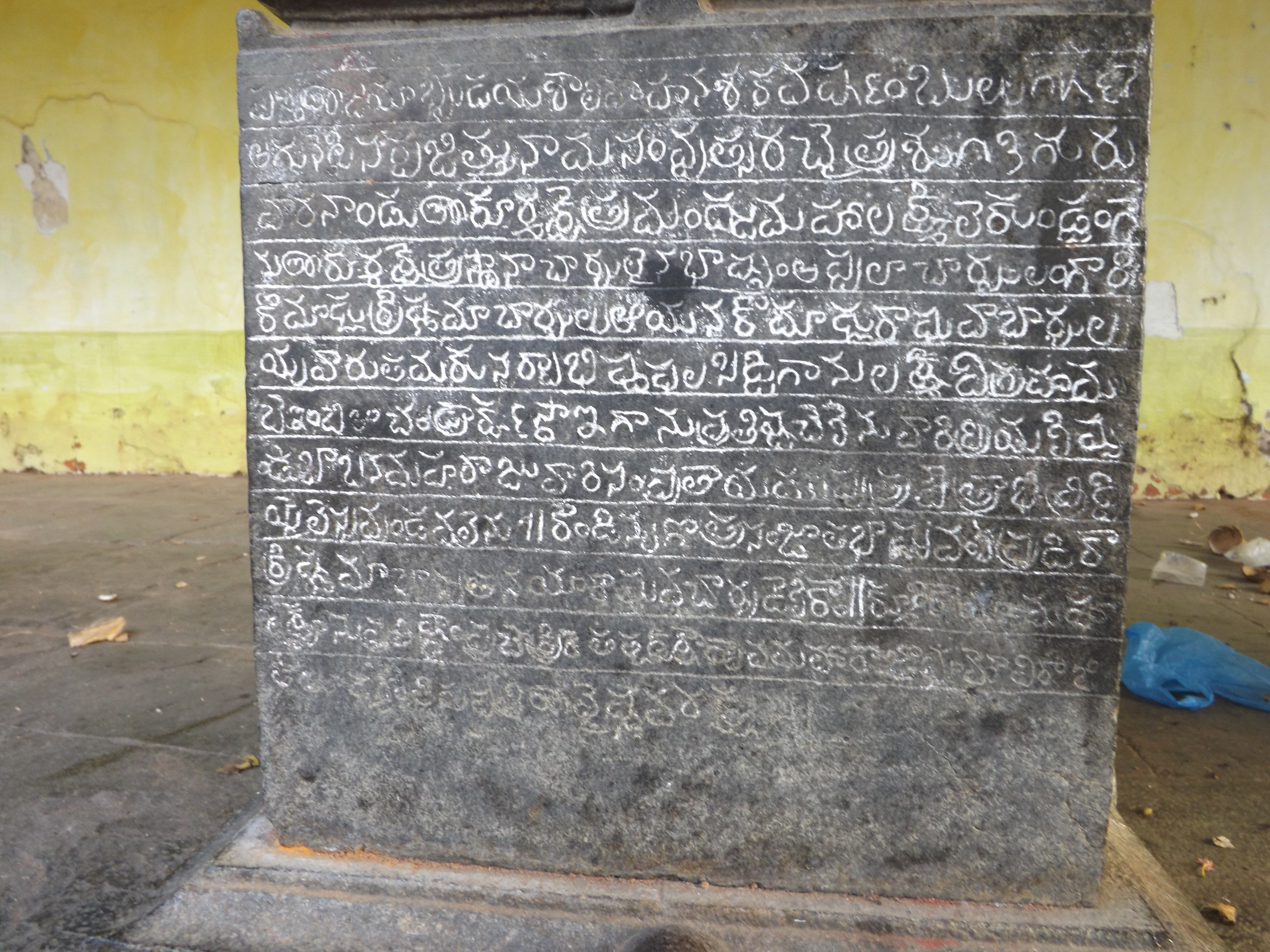
One of the inscriptions in the temple, written in Telugu language

The temple is situated in the Gara mandal of the Srikakulam district, which is located at a distance of 130 kilometres (81 mi) from Visakhapatnam. It is one of the Indian temples where the Hindu deity Vishnu is worshipped in the form of a tortoise (the others being Sri Gaviranganatha Swami temple at Gavirangapura, Chitradurga, Karnataka and Sri Kurma Varadaraja Swami temple at Kurmai, Chittoor, Andhra Pradesh). Srikurmam is 15 kilometres (9.3 mi) away from Srikakulam town and 12.5 kilometres (7.8 mi) away from the Suryanarayana temple, Arasavalli. Inscriptional history of the temple begins in the 11th-12th centuries. The temple is popular among the Tamil diaspora as well because it is a Vaishnavite temple. Ramanuja's disciples established Vaishnavism in the temple with the support of Kalinga king Anantavarman Chodaganga, the eastern Ganga king. After this incident, a group of devadasis were employed to sing and dance daily before the deity in the morning and evening.

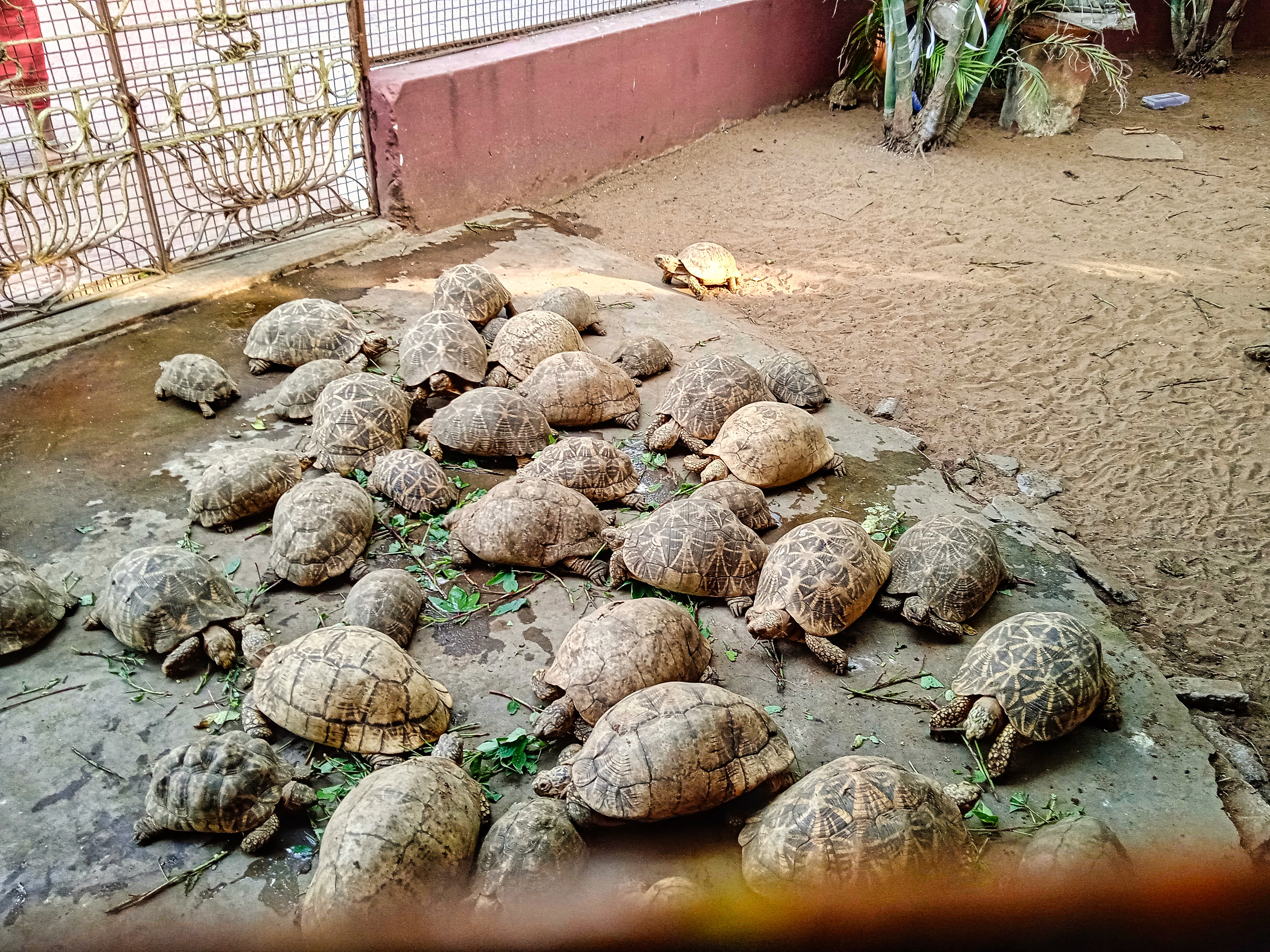
Live tortoises in the Kurmanatha Swamy temple's premises, its preservation efforts

Srikurmam was regarded as an important centre of Vaishnavism in the medieval period along with Simhachalam and others. It was also regarded as the Gurupitha (sacred place of the master) of the Ganga kings of Utkala. Naraharitirtha, the disciple of Madhvacharya, was instrumental in making Srikurmam the seat of Vishnavite religious activities. He also defended the place from an attack of the Sabaras, a group of savage inhabitants of the Ganjam forests. Srikurmam influenced the kings, officials, and Vaishnavite devotees to change their names in accordance with the religious faith they followed. Due to his close association with the eastern Ganga kings, Naraharitirtha created the office of Bhoga Pariksha (religious head) with the aim of having the successive Madhwa saints supervise religious matters and pray for the welfare of the royal family and kingdom. Naraharitirtha later built a temple dedicated to Yogananda Narasimha in front of Srikurmam. The temple inscriptions mention Narasimha Dasa Pandita and Purushottama Deva as the Bhoga Parikshas. Currently, Srikurmam is under the trusteeship of the Gajapathi Rajus of Vizianagaram.

== Legends ==
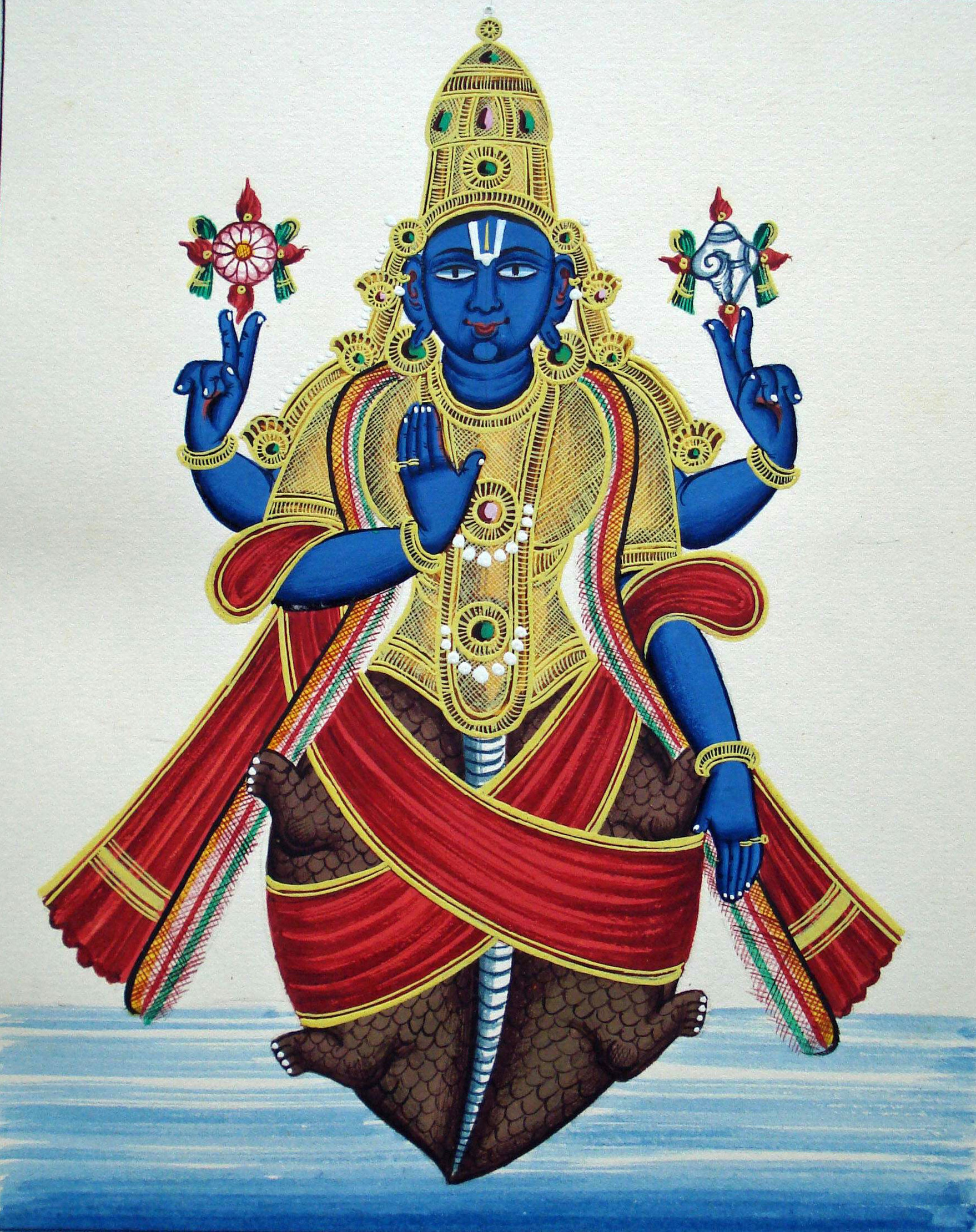
Kurma Narayana, one of the avatars of the Hindu deity Vishnu

During the reign of king Swetha Chakravarthi, this area was referred to as Swetha Giri. Swetha Chakravarthi's wife Vishnu Priya was a devotee of Vishnu. When she was observing a fast on an Ekadasi day, Swetha Chakravarthi approached her with the intention of making love. When she refused, saying the time was not ideal, the king became adamant. She prayed to Vishnu, who created a stream of water, separating the couple. Swetha Chakravarthi was carried away in the ensuing flood and Vishnu Priya followed him to the hilly terrains of Swetha Giri. The sage Narada initiated an upadesam of the Kurma Narayana mantra and asked the king to pray to Vishnu using it. By the time Vishnu appeared in the form of the Kurma (tortoise) avatar, the king's health had deteriorated. Vishnu then made his Sudarshana Chakra make an impression in the nearby land, forming a lake. Swetha Chakravarthi bathed in the lake and regained his health, after which it was referred to as Swetha Pushkarani. Upon the king's request, Vishnu manifested as the deity of Kurmanatha. According to the Padma Purana, Brahma officiated the celestial rituals and consecrated the deity with Gopala Yantra. Vishnu is worshipped as Kurmanatha Swamy or Kurma Narayana, along with his consort Lakshmi, who is referred to as Kurmanayaki.

Later, a tribal king visited the Swetha Pushkarani and was impressed with it. After learning about the story of its origin from Swetha Chakravarthi, the tribal king constructed a tank around the lake and began worshipping the deity regularly. The tribal king used to stay in Sage Sampangi's monastery, which was situated in the Western side of the temple. Upon the king's request, the deity started facing west. The sage Durvasa visited the temple later with his disciples; the event of his arrival was considered significant. Rama's sons Lava and Kusha were said to have worshipped Vishnu as Kurmanatha in Srikurmam. In Dvapara Yuga, Balarama visited the temple and was denied entry by Bhairava, who was serving as the temple's Kshetrapala (guardian deity). Infuriated, Balarama threw Bhairava away from the temple premises. Kurmanatha learned of this and gave Balarama permission to enter the temple. Balarama, in resentment, cursed that Srikurmam would be the only temple where Vishnu would be worshipped in the form of Kurma Narayana. Legends also say that upon Vishnu's request, Anjaneya agreed to guard the temple.

== Architecture ==
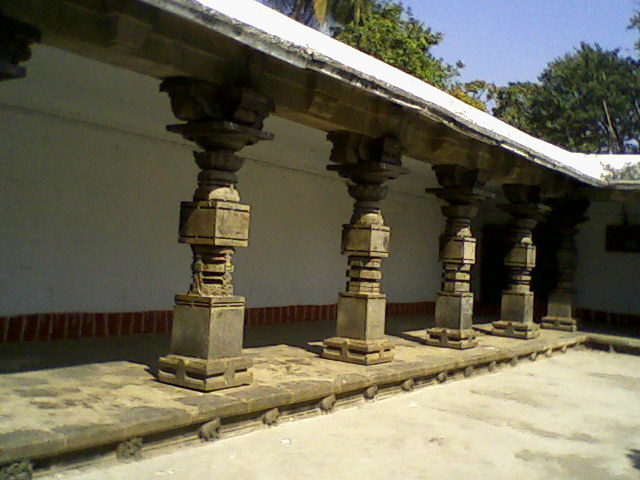
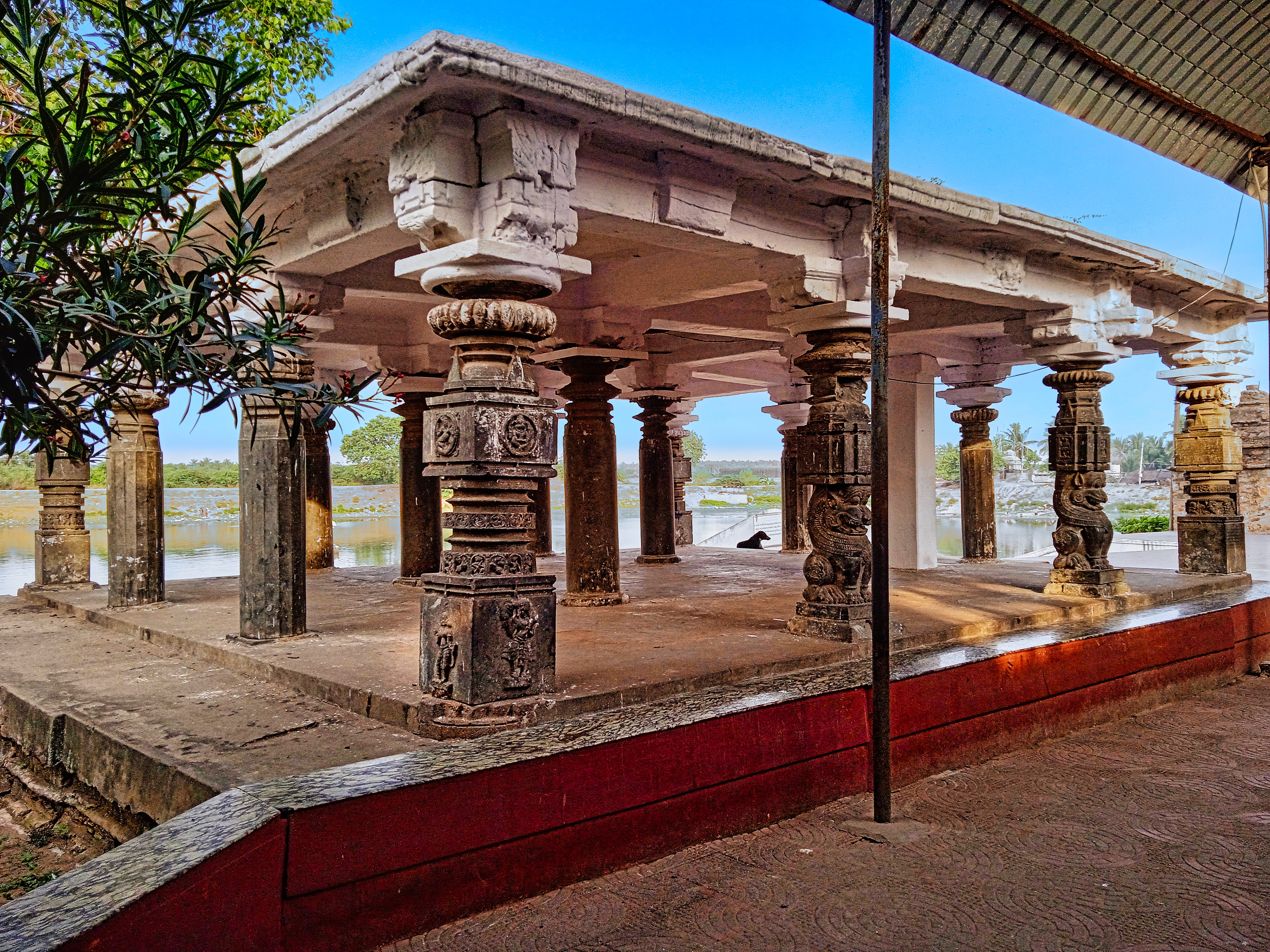
(top) A part of the complex which features the 108 ekasila (single-stone) pillars (bottom) A view of the Swetha Pushkarani with mandapa.

Srikurmam temple is known for its distinctive architectural style. The design of the gopuram is different from the regular style seen at other Vaishnavite temples. It also has two dhvajasthambas, one on the west and the other on the east, which is another rare element in a Vaishnavite temple. The upper part of the sanctum sanctorum is built in the form of an ashtadala padmam (eight-petaled lotus). The devotees can directly enter the sanctum sanctorum to offer prayers, unlike the method specified by the traditional rules of Vaishnavism.

The utsava deities of Govindaraja Swamy and his consorts Sridevi and Bhudevi were found in the Swetha Pushkarani in the 12th century CE. The utsava deities of Rama, Sita, and Laksmana were presented by Naraharitirtha. All these deities are located in a small room near the sanctum sanctorum and are worshipped daily. The deity of Kurmanathaswamy is made of black stone, but due to regular applications of sandalwood paste, it appears yellow. It sits on a platform made of stone with a length of 5 feet, a height of 1 foot, and a width of 4 feet. The deity is 2.5 feet (0.76 m) long and consists of three stone structures. The stone representing the head faces the west; the middle stone represents the body of the tortoise; the small stone at the rear end, covered with swirling circles, represents either the tail of the tortoise or the Sudarshana Chakra.

Beside the sanctum sanctorum of Kurmanatha, there is a temple dedicated to Kurmanayaki in which a deity of Andal is found. Hatakeswara, Karpureswara, Koteswara, Sundareswara, and Pathalasiddheswara are among the temple's guardian deities. The temple's tank Swetha Pushkarani is also known by the name Sudha Kundam. In the middle of the temple tank, there is a small construction named Narasimha mandapam. The sand below the waters of the temple tank is white in colour, and is known as Gopi Chandanam. Legends say that Krishna played with gopikas in these waters, after which the sand turned white when a sage saw them. The temple contains 108 ekasila (single-stone) pillars, with none resembling each other. They bear few inscriptions related to the royal lineages that existed in this area in the past.

In the temple's premises, a tortoise park has been built to conserve the adult and young star tortoises, which are found in the foothills and fields of Srikakulam. Srikurmam is the only conservation centre for this species. Devotees offer these tortoises from the nearby fields. They also feed gongura leaves to these tortoises as a token of respect for the deity. The Endowment Board of the Government of Andhra Pradesh and NGO Green Mercy took on the responsibility for the conservation of these star tortoises. As of September 2015, the temple hosted a total of 255 tortoises. The temple also contains 42 mural paintings of Krishna on its walls.

== Festivals and religious practices ==
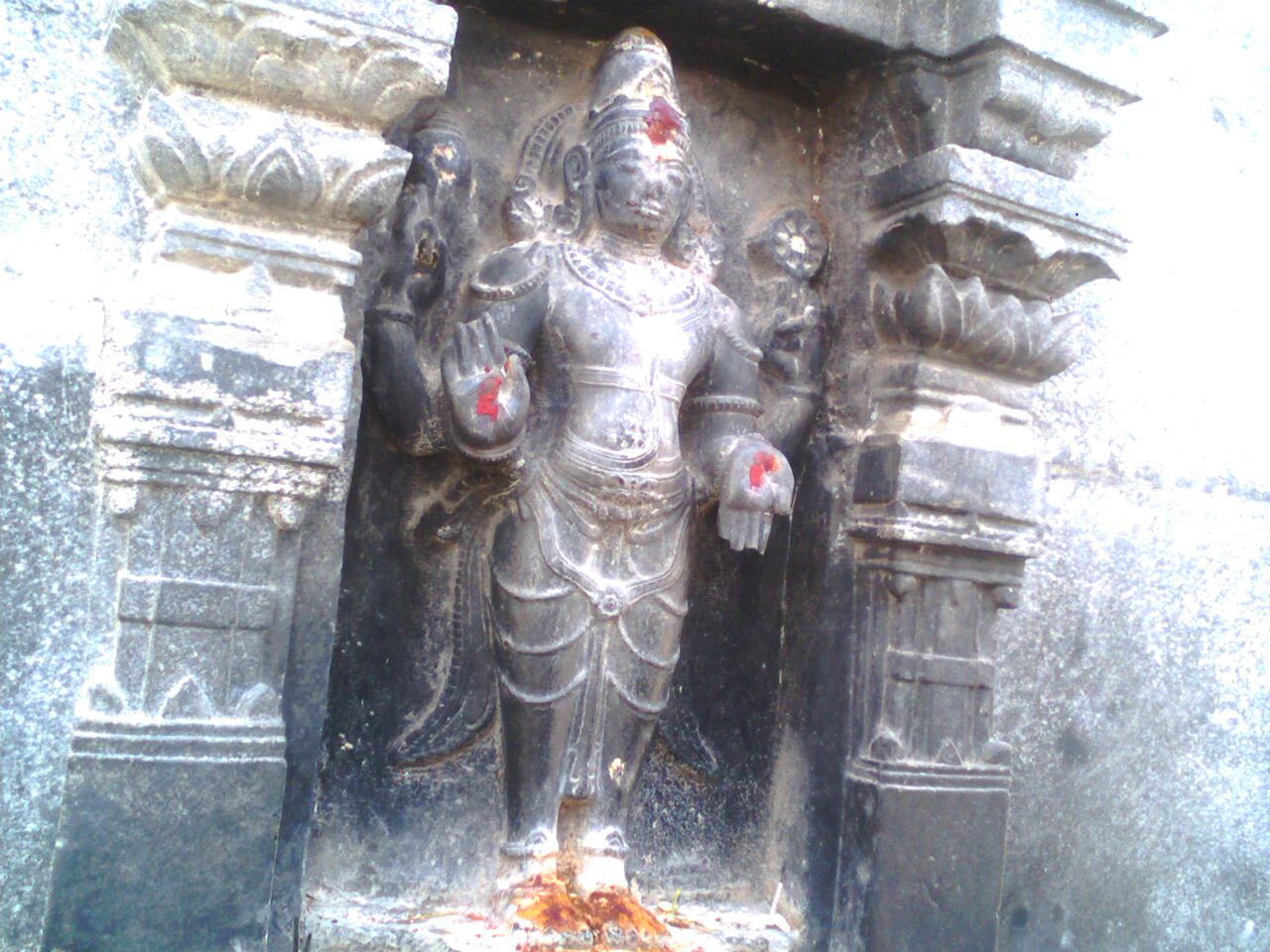
A statue of Vishnu being worshiped in the temple

Srikurmam is one of the rare Indian temples that follow both Shaivite and Vaishnavite traditions. Abhisheka is performed daily to the deity, and devotees are allowed to participate in person; this is a feature seen more often in Shaivite temples than in Vaishnavite temples. Akhanda Deeparadhana (Lamp worship), Nitya Bhogam (Daily offering) and Kalyanam (Marriage) are regularly performed to the deities. Devotees visit the Pathalasiddheswara temple before entering the sanctum sanctorum of Kurmanathaswamy.

Ancestor worship is famous in Srikurmam, because of which it is known as pitrukshetra. People believe that their ancestors' souls shall gain salvation if offered prayers here. Because of this, hundreds of devotees perform ancestor worship. Devotees use the Gopi Chandanam while applying thirunamam on their forehead. The three-day Dolotsavam is the major festival celebrated in the temple. Kamadahanam is celebrated on the first day, followed by Padiya and Dolotsavam. The annual Kalyanotsavam is celebrated on Vaisakha Suddha Ekadasi. Other festive activities include Kurma Jayanthi on Jyeshta Bahula Dwadasi and Mukkoti Ekadasi.

== In the media ==
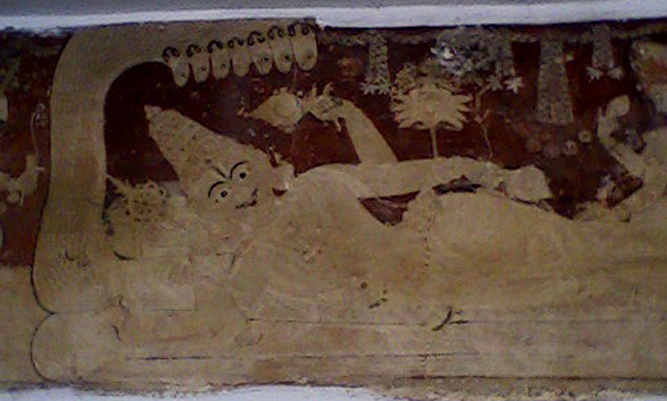
One of the mural paintings in the temple, featuring Vishnu as Ranganatha

In May 2011, the Andhra Pradesh State Archaeology Department extended its technical and financial support in modernising the temple and preserving the mural paintings. The Indian postal department issued a stamp featuring the temple on 11 April 2013, at a price of five rupees. Days later, the temple's head priest Murali Krishna was attacked by the devotees for allegedly making a wax replica of Kurmanatha's deity. He claimed that a Bangalore-based businessman had offered to provide silver ornaments to the deity, and that he took the measurements for the same using wax. The temple's executive officer Prasad Patnaik was criticised for being unavailable, and devotees demanded his immediate arrest. The North Andhra Priests' Association supported the priests of Srikurmam, and stated that the temple officials had made them "scapegoats".

From 7–20 July 2014, 55 tortoise hatchlings were bred in the temple, which Green Mercy claimed to be a world record. In September 2015, The Times of India reported about an incident of mass mortality among those 55 tortoises due to infections and poor maintenance, said to be caused by a number of environmental and man-made factors. The number was reduced to 24, and the park's curator K. V. Ramana Murthy pointed out that the forest department agreed to conserve them, but the offer was put on hold by the high court after a petition filed by devotees and a few religious organisations. Apart from lack of manpower and proper funds, the Hudhud cyclone caused severe damage to the tortoise park.

== Bibliography ==
- Krishna Kumari, M. (1990). Social and Cultural Life in Medieval Andhra. New Delhi: Discovery Publishing House. ISBN 81-7141-102-9.
- Ayyar, P. V. Jagadisa (1982). South Indian Shrines: Illustrated. New Delhi: Asian Educational Services. ISBN 81-206-0151-3.
- Mishra, Kanhu Charan (1971). The cult of Jagannātha. The University of Michigan.
- Patel, Sushil Kumar (1992). Hinduism in India: A Study of Viṣṇu Worship. Amar Prakashan. ISBN 81-854-2035-1.
- Suryanarayana, Kolluru (1986). History of the Minor Chāḷukya Families in Medieval Āndhradēśa. B.R. Publishing Corporation. ISBN 81-701-8330-8.
- Choudary, D. Kiran Kranth; Udayalakshmi, C. (2006). Rāmāyaṇa in Indian Art and Epigraphy. Harman Publishing House. ISBN 81-866-2276-4.
