= Sri Kurmam =

- Village
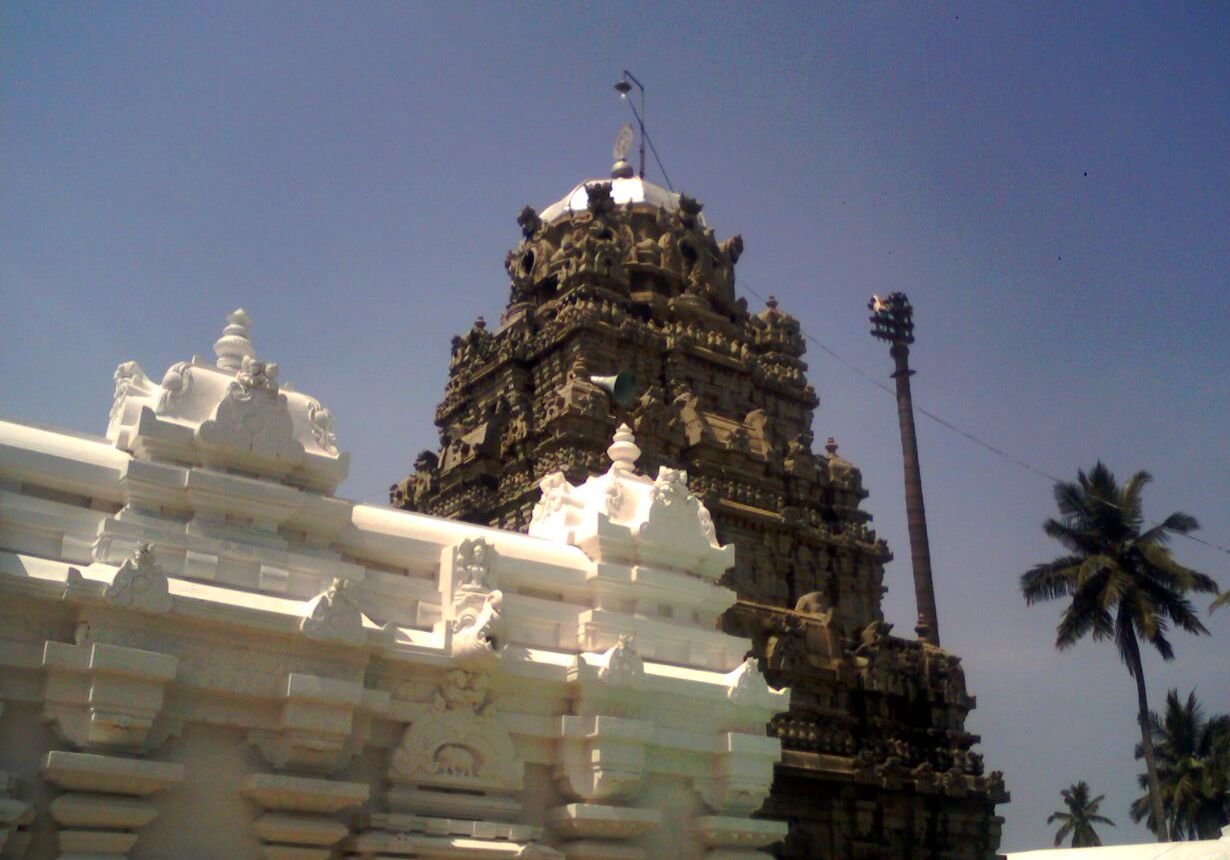
- Sri Kurmam Temple view
- Interactive map of Sri Kurmam
- Location in Andhra Pradesh, India Sri Kurmam (India)
- Coordinates: 18.271°N 84.005°E
- Country: India
- State: Andhra Pradesh
- District: Srikakulam
- Elevation: 17 m (56 ft)

Languages
  - Official: Telugu
- Time zone: UTC+5:30 (IST)
- PIN: 532 404
- Vehicle Registration: AP30 (Former); AP39 (from 30 January 2019)

Sri Kurmam also known as Srikurmu or Srikurma is a village near Srikakulam, Andhra Pradesh, India, 14.5 km southeast of Srikakulam town in the Gara mandal of Srikakulam district. It was named after the Srikurmam temple dedicated to Kurma avatar of the Hindu god Vishnu, which was re-established by Eastern Ganga Dynasty king Anantavarman Chodaganga Deva.

== Geography ==
Sri Kurmam is located at a latitude of 18° 16' N, a longitude of 84° 1' E and an altitude of 17 meters (59 feet).

== Sri Kurmam Temple ==
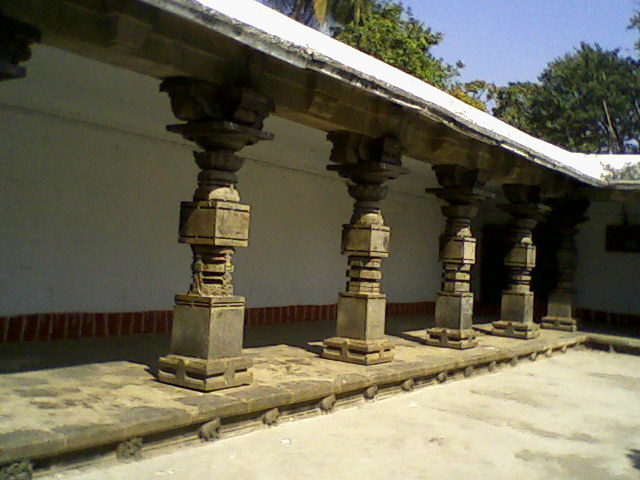
Mandapam at Srikurmam Temple

Sri Kurmam temple includes inscriptions from the 11th century CE to the 19th century CE. According to inscriptions in the temple dated 1281 CE, Kürmakshetra was restored by Ramanuja under the influence of Anantavarman Chodaganga Deva of Kalinga. Eastern ganga king Anangabhima Deva built its pradakshina mandapa. Later the temple came under the jurisdiction of the king of Suryavanshi Gajapatis of Orissa. The temple is dedicated to Kurmanatha, the second avatar of Vishnu. Dolotsavam is the important festival when more than 20,000 pilgrims visit.
