= Ananta (infinite) =

Sanskrit term; Epithet of Vishnu

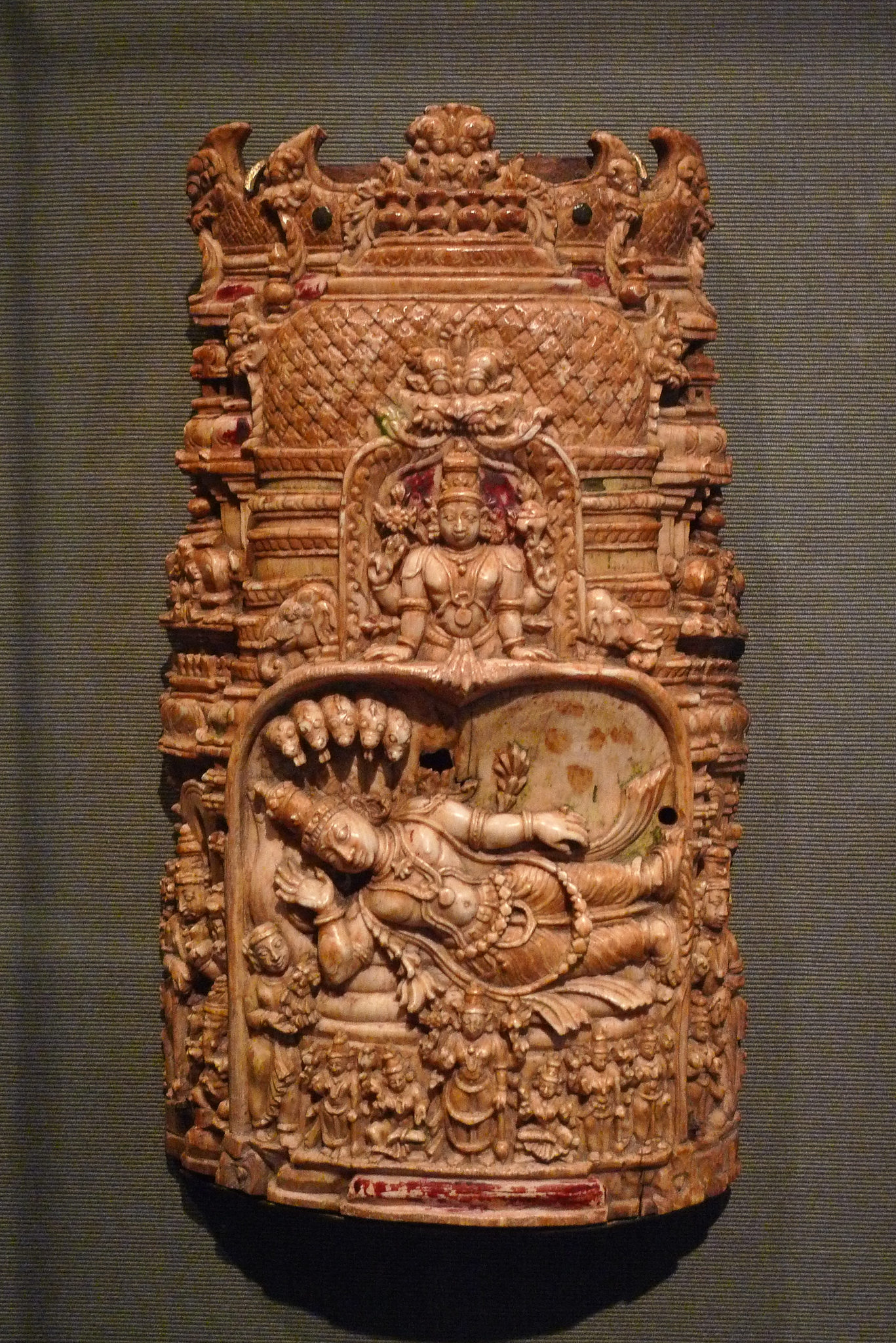
Representation of Vishnu, the primary bearer of the epithet

Ananta (Sanskrit: अनन्त, lit. 'Without end'), is a Sanskrit term, and primarily an epithet of Vishnu.

== Vaishnavism ==
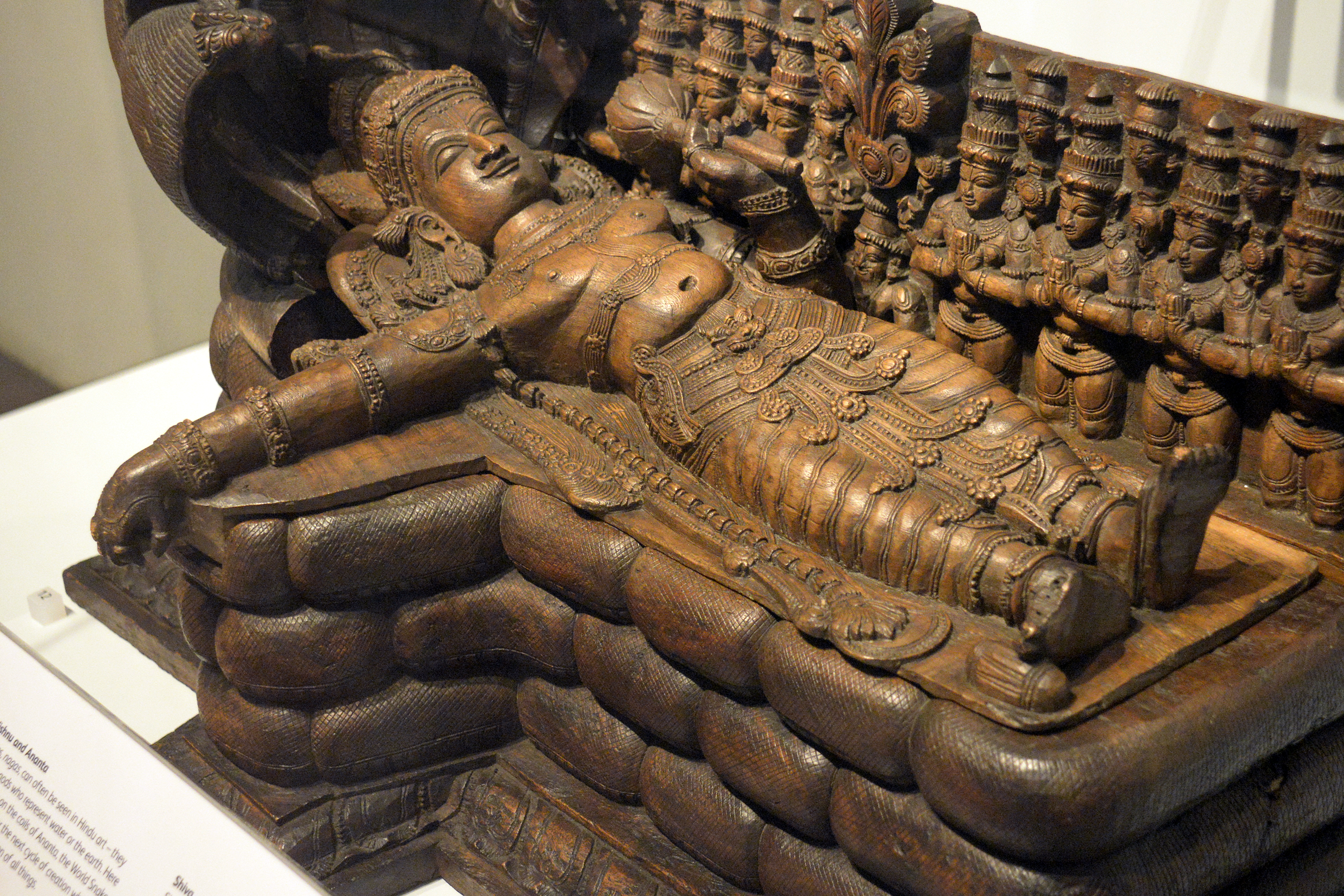
Vishnu sleeps on the coils of Ananta (the World Snake). He will awake for the next cycle of creation which heralds the destruction of all things. Sculpture. From India, c. 14th century CE. National Museum of Scotland, Edinburgh

It is one of many of the names of Vishnu. Ananta is also a name of Shesha, the celestial snake, on which Vishnu reclines in the cosmic ocean.

In the Mahabharata, Ananta, or Shesha, is the son of Kashyapa, one of the Prajapatis, through Kadru as her eldest son. Kadru had asked her sons to stay suspended in the hair of Uchchaihshravas’s tail who on refusing to do so were cursed to die at the serpent-yajna of Janamejaya. Ananta was saved by Brahma who directed him to go to the nether world and support the world on his hoods, and thus became the king of the Nagas in Patala. By the grace of Ananta, Garga was able to master the sciences of astronomy and causation.

In Hindu tradition, it is said that Rudra will emanate from the face of Ananta and consume the three worlds at the end of a kalpa.

Ananta is also an epithet of Brahma, Shiva, Skanda, Krishna, Balarama, earth, and the letter A.

== Vedanta ==
Ananta is one of four types of objects or categories of being:

- Ananta has a beginning but no end
- Nitya has neither beginning nor an end
- Anitya has a beginning and an end
- Anadi has no beginning, but has an end

According to the Vedanta School, the term Ananta used in the phrase "anadi (beginningless) ananta (endless) akhanda (unbroken) satcitananda (being-consciousness-bliss)" refers to the Infinite, the single non-dual reality.

It denotes Brahman as one of six attributes which are prajna, priyam, satyam, ananta, ananda and stithi that are said to manifest themselves in space, which is common to all six bases.

Brahman has no initial cause and is known as anadikarana, the uncreated who is not a product, which means Brahman has no material cause and is not the material cause of anything. Ananta is the infinite space, the infinite space is Brahman.

== Yoga ==
According to the Yoga School, Ananta is the serpent of infinity who eavesdropped on the secret teaching that was being imparted to Goddess Parvati by Lord Shiva; the secret teaching was Yoga. On being apprehended Ananta was sentenced by Lord Shiva to impart that teaching to human beings for which purpose Ananta assumed the human form and was called Patanjali. In his Yoga Sutras, Patanjali stresses upon the use of breath to achieve perfection in posture which entails steadiness and comfort, by making an effort, the effort meant is the effort of breathing. The effort of breathing has been highlighted by the term, Ananta, in Sutra 2.47. Ananta was called Patanjali because he desired to teach Yoga to human beings, he fell from heaven to earth landing in the palm of a virtuous woman named Gonika.

Ananta is also the name of the serpent who overheard Lord Shiva teaching goddess Parvati the secrets of yoga. When Lord Shiva learned of Ananta’s eavesdropping, he ordered Ananta to share that learning with the entire human race. Therefore, Ananta assumed human form as Sage Patanjali and taught the Eight Limbs of Yoga for the well-being of mankind.

== Jainism ==
According to Jainism the pure soul of each life form is:

- Ananta-gyana (Endless Knowledge)
- Ananta-darshana (Endless Perception)
- Ananta-caritra (Endless Consciousness)
- Ananta-sukha (Endless Bliss)

The 14th of the 24 Jain Tirathankaras is known as Ananta or Anant Nath.

== Buddhism ==
Ananta also appears in the Buddhist iconography as one of three female deities emanating from Dhyani Buddha Amitabha.
