= Kurmai =

Kurmai or Kurmoi or Koormayi is a village in Palamaner mandal of Chittoor district of Andhra Pradesh, India.

== Geography ==
Kurmai a village panchayat is in Palamaner Mandal of Chittoor District, Andhra Pradesh is located at 13.1650°N 78.7358°E. It has an average elevation of 648 meters (2,126 feet). There is an ancient Kurma Varadarajaswamy Temple located in this place.
