= Gara, Srikakulam district =

Gara
- Village
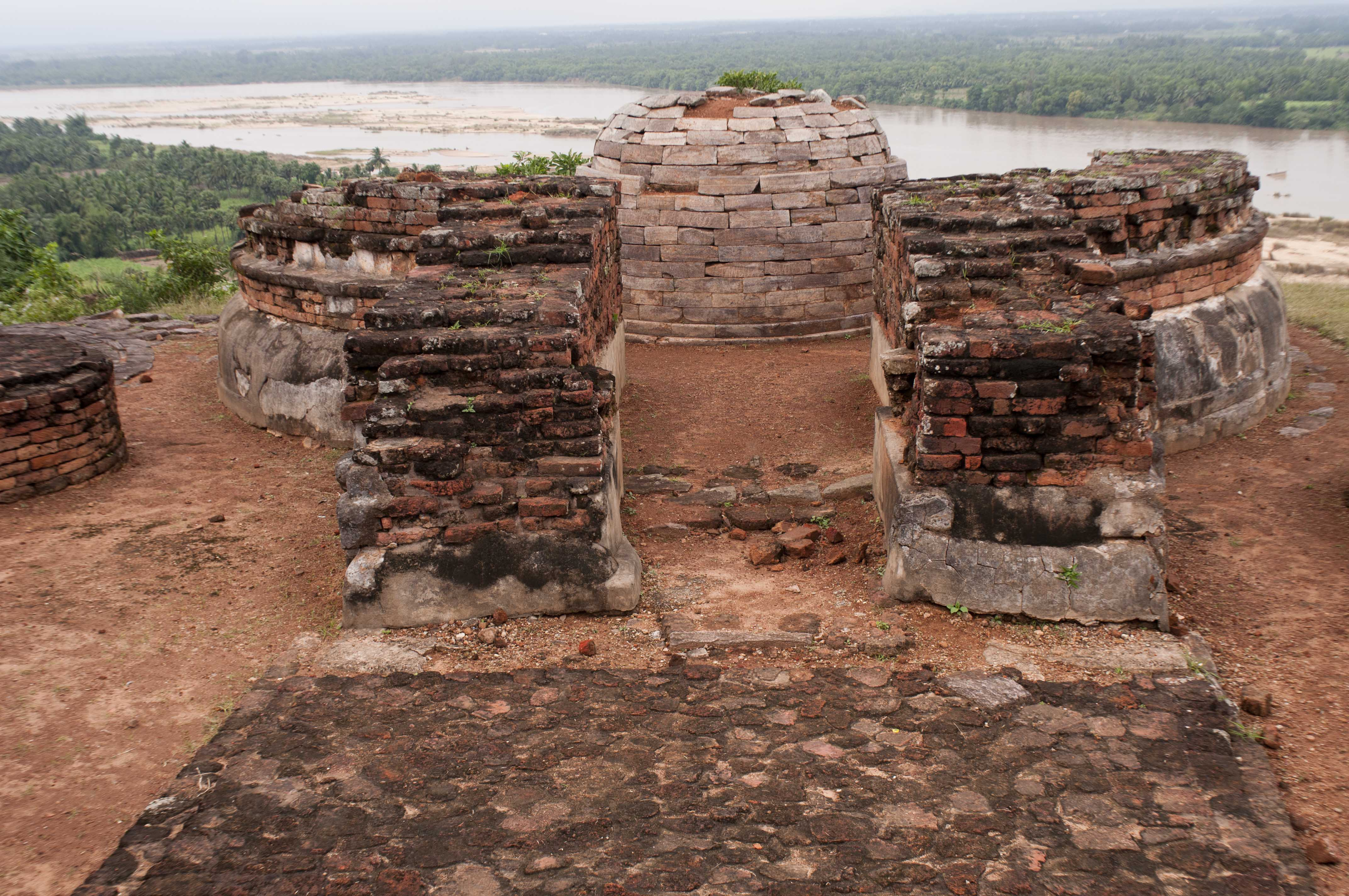
- Salihundam Historic Buddhist Site is located in Gara Mandal
- Interactive map of Gara
- Location in Andhra Pradesh, India Gara (India)
- Coordinates: 18.3333°N 84.0500°E
- Country: India
- State: Andhra Pradesh
- District: Srikakulam
- Talukas: Kalingapatnam

Languages
  - Official: Telugu
- Time zone: UTC+5:30 (IST)
- PIN: 532405
- Vehicle Registration: AP30 (Former); AP39 (from 30 January 2019)

Gara is a village in Srikakulam district of the Indian state of Andhra Pradesh. It is also the mandal headquarters of Gara Mandal, Srikakulam District, AP.

== Geography ==
Gara is located at 18.3333°N 84.0500°E. It has an average elevation of 21 meters (72 feet).

== Demographics ==
As of 2001 Indian census, the demographic details of this mandal is as follows:

- Total Population: 75,017 in 17,154 households.
- Male Population: 37,373 and Female Population: 37,644
- Children Under 6-years of age: 10,036 (Boys - 5,182 and Girls - 4,854)
- Total Literates: 37,048

== Transportation ==
=== Rail ===
The nearest railway station is Srikakulam road (Amadalavalasa) which is 20 km from Gara village.

=== Bus ===
Gara is well connected by bus service from Srikakulam town.
