= Yudhishthira =

Eldest Pandava in the epic Mahabharata

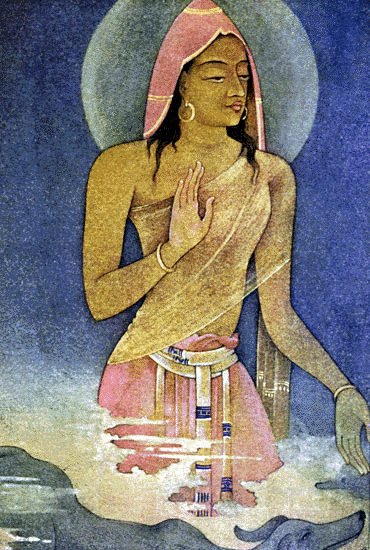
- Yudhishthira entering heaven alive with his dog, painting by Nandalal Bose, c. 1913

In-universe information
- Position: Chakravarti Samrat; Dharmaraja
- Weapon: Bow and arrow, Javelin
- Family: Dharma (father); Pandu (legal father); Kunti (mother); Madri (step-mother): Karna; Bhima; Arjuna; Nakula; Sahadeva; (brothers)
- Spouses: Draupadi; Devika
- Children: Prativindhya by Draupadi; Yaudheya by Devika
- Relatives: Kauravas (paternal cousins); Krishna (maternal cousin); Dhritarashtra and Vidura (paternal uncles)

Yudhishthira (Sanskrit: युधिष्ठिर, romanized: Yudhiṣṭhira, lit. 'one who is steady in battle'), also known as Dharmaputra (lit. 'Son of Dharma') and Dharmaraja (lit. 'King of Dharma'), was the eldest among the five Pandavas, and is also one of the central characters of the ancient Hindu epic Mahabharata. He was the king of Indraprastha and later the King of the Kuru kingdom in the epic.

Yudhishthira was the son of Kunti, the first wife of King Pandu, fathered by the personification of Dharma, due to a curse preventing Pandu from having children. Yudhishthira held a strong belief in dharma (morals and virtues) and was chosen as the crown prince of Kuru. However, after the Lakshagriha incident, he was presumed dead and his cousin Duryodhana was appointed as the new heir. The kingdom was split in half due to a succession dispute between Yudhishthira and Duryodhana. Yudhishthira received the barren half (Khandavprastha), which he later transformed into the magnificent city of Indraprastha.

Yudhishthira and his brothers, the Pandavas (lit. 'Descendants of Pandu'), had a polyandrous marriage with Draupadi, the princess of Panchala, who became the empress of Indraprastha. After Yudhishthira performed the Rajasuya Yagna, he was invited to play a game of dice by his jealous cousin, Duryodhana and his uncle, Shakuni. Shakuni, a master at the game, represented Duryodhana against Yudhishthira and manipulated him into gambling his kingdom, wealth, the freedom of his brothers, Draupadi, and even himself. After the game, the Pandavas and Draupadi were sent into exile for thirteen years, with the last year requiring them to live incognito. If they were recognized during the 13th year, they would have to go to the forest for another twelve years. During his exile, Yudhisthira was tested by his divine father Yama. During the last year of the exile, known as Agyaata Vaasa, Yudhishthira disguised himself as a Brahmin named Kanka and served to the King of Matsya Kingdom.

Yudhishthira was the leader of the successful Pandava faction in the Kurukshetra War, notably slaying the commander Shalya of the Kaurava army. He then ruled the Kuru Kingdom for 36 years before announcing his retirement. At the end of the epic, he was the only one among his brothers and wife to ascend to heaven while retaining his mortal body.

== Etymology and historicity ==
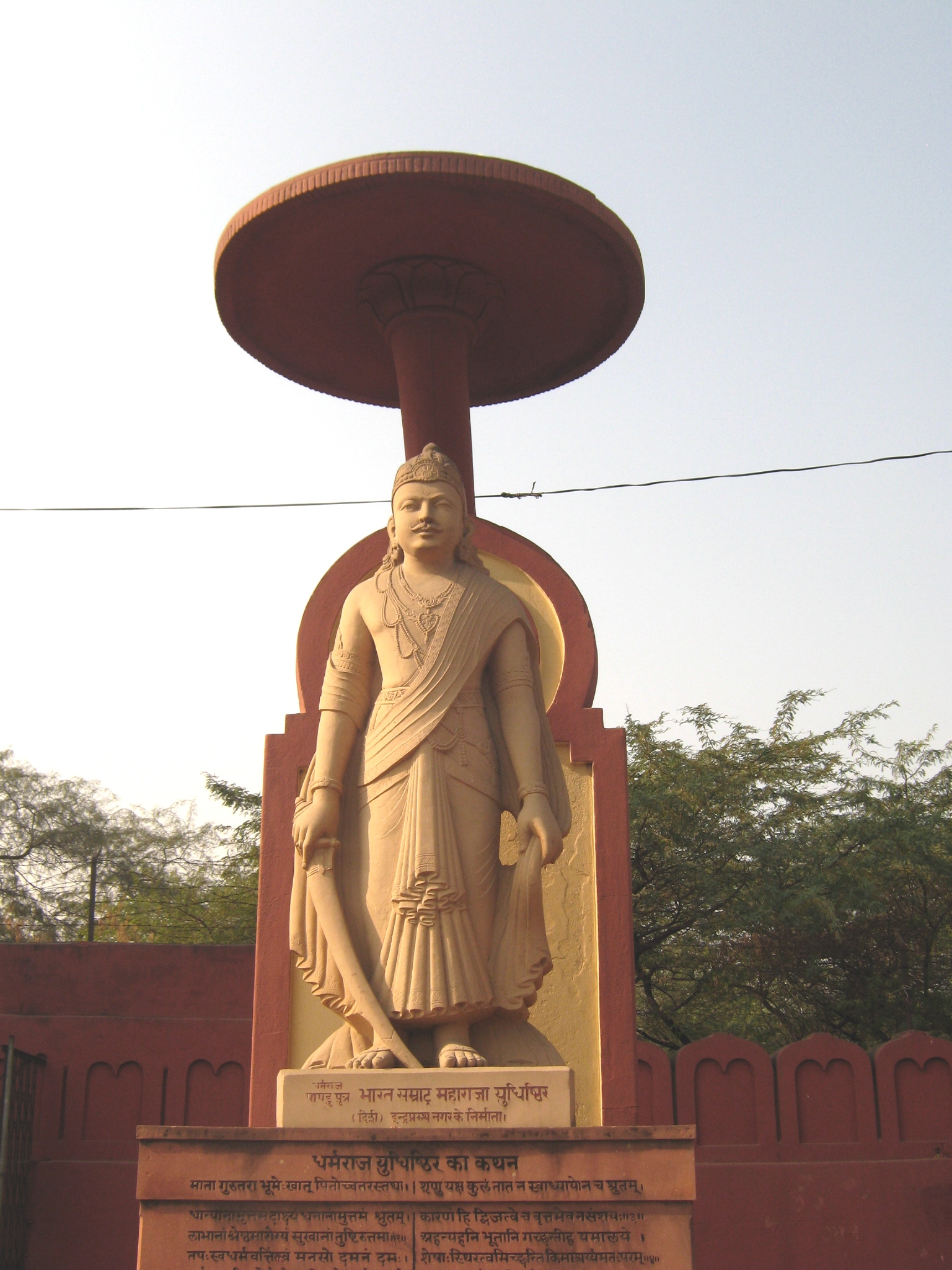
Statue of Yudhishthira

The word Yudhiṣṭhira is an aluk compound (meaning it preserves the case ending of its first part). It means "one who is steady in battle". It is composed of the words, yudhi (masculine locative singular) meaning "in battle"—from yudh (युध्) meaning 'battle, fighting'—and sthira (स्थिर) meaning 'steady' or 'stable'. His other names are:

- Bharata-vanshī (भरतवंशी) – descendant of Bharata
- Ajātashatru (अजातशत्रु) – one who is born without enemies
- Dharmanandana (धर्मनन्दन) or Dharmaputra (धर्मपुत्र) – The son of Dharma (Righteousness) or Yama Dharma Raja
- Dharmarāja (धर्मराज) or Dharmarāya or Dharmaja – Lord of Dharma.
- Pānduputra (पांडुपुत्र) – Son of Pandu.
- Pāndavāgrajah (पाण्डवाग्रजः) – Eldest of Pandavas.
- Jyeshthakaunteya (ज्येष्ठकौन्तेय) – Eldest son of Kunti.
- Sārvabhauma (सार्वभौम) / Samrāt Chakravarti (सम्राट् चक्रवर्ती) – Emperor of the complete planet Earth.
- Kanka (कङ्क) – another name for Yudhisthira given by Draupadi for the 13th year in exile.

According to Buddhist sources, by the late and post-Vedic periods, Kuru had become a minor state ruled by a chieftain called Koravya and belonging to the Yuddhiṭṭhila (Yudhiṣṭhira) gotta.

== Birth and early life ==
According to the Mahabharata, Yudhishthira was born under extraordinary circumstances, fathered by the god Dharma (the god of righteousness) through the practice of niyoga (levirate), as detailed in the narrative of the Adi Parva. Pandu, the king of Kuru, was married to Kunti and Madri. His life changed abruptly after a hunting accident led to a curse: intimacy with his wives would mean instant death. Choosing celibacy and asceticism, Pandu abdicated his throne, abandoned hunting, and pursued moksha (liberation), while his elder blind brother Dhritarashtra took over the reins of the kingdom. Pandu's devoted wives joined him in this mountain retreat, despite his initial reluctance. Though initially unconcerned with heirs, Pandu later fixated on his childlessness. When he sought to ascend to heaven with his wives, sages halted them, citing his lack of children which became a profound personal failure.

Kunti, Pandu's first wife, had received a boon from the sage Durvasa in the form of a powerful mantra, which allowed her to summon any god to grant her a son. As Gandhari, Dhritarashtra’s wife, neared the birth of her own children, Pandu grew anxious and requested Kunti to apply her boon. He suggested that she call Dharma to get a truthful, knowledgeable, and just son who could rule Hastinapur (capital of Kuru). She did so and became pregnant with Dharma's child. The child arrived at midday on the eighth day of the month of Jyeshtha, on the fifth lunar day (Panchami), during the auspicious Abhijit hour. At his birth, a celestial voice declared, "This boy will grow to be a highly righteous and courageous king, the finest among the virtuous. He will be known as Yudhishthira." Following this divine proclamation, the child was named Yudhishthira.

Following Yudhishthira’s birth, Pandu’s desire for more sons grew. He urged Kunti to invoke her boon again, leading to Bhima’s birth from Vayu and Arjuna’s from Indra. With three invocations used, Kunti shared the boon with Madri, who called upon the Ashwini Kumaras and bore Pandu the twins Nakula and Sahadeva. Thus, the five Pandavas were born, fulfilling Pandu’s wish for a strong lineage. After Pandu had five sons through divine means, he took his family to the Shatashringa forest, under the care of the resident sages.

=== Boyhood ===
Yudhishthira's boyhood is mainly detailed in the Southern recension of the Mahabharata, according to which Kashyapa, a priest associated with Vasudeva, conducted Yudhishthira’s upanayana (sacred thread ceremony), while Rajarshi Shuka trained him in spear warfare during this time. Tragedy struck when Pandu, attested in all recensions, unable to resist the curse that doomed him, died in the forest, and Madri, his second wife, chose to end her life in guilt that she was involved in Pandu's death. According to Southern recension, before doing so, Madri summoned Yudhishthira, clasped her hands, and entrusted him with the responsibility of his younger brothers, saying, "Son, you are now the father to your brothers."

=== Youth ===
Following the deaths of Pandu and Madri, the forest sages escorted Kunti and the children to Hastinapura, where they handed them over to the Kuru grandsire, Bhishma, recounting the events that had transpired. Yudhishthira and his brothers grew up in Hastinapura with their cousins, including Duryodhana, who clashed with Bhima. During a Ganga River outing planned by Duryodhana, he offered Bhima food that contained a heavy sedative, proceeding then to bind and throw him into the water. When Yudhishthira noticed Bhima missing, he alerted Kunti; Bhima soon returned, recounting his ordeal in Nagaloka and his escape. Yudhishthira wisely advised his brothers to keep the incident secret and not seek revenge.

In Hastinapura, the Pandavas trained under Kripa and later Drona, their preceptor, with Yudhishthira excelling in chariot warfare. As gurudakshina (a traditional offering to the teacher), Yudhishthira initially volunteered to capture King Drupada and present him bound before Drona. However, Arjuna intervened and took on the task himself.

Dhritarashtra named Yudhishthira heir-apparent after his warfare training, impressed by his righteousness and skill. His popularity among the citizens eclipsed Pandu’s, enraging Duryodhana, who feared the Pandavas’ rise. With Dhritarashtra’s hesitant approval, Duryodhana and Shakuni plotted their demise, sending them to Varanavata in a flammable lac palace built by Purochana. Despite Dhritarashtra’s doubts, the plan proceeded. Yudhishthira, warned by his uncle Vidura’s coded message, deterred followers but prepared an escape. Spotting the palace’s weakness, he and Bhima planned a tunnel with Vidura’s sapper. After a year, Bhima torched the house during a feast, leaving a Nishada family inside as decoys. The Pandavas fled via the tunnel, while Dhritarashtra and the Kuru clan, believing them dead, ordered their funeral rites in Hastinapura.

After the lac palace in Varanavata burned to ashes, the Mahabharata recounts that the Pandavas were presumed dead, and decided to go on hiding to avoid further such incidents. Vidura secretly informed Bhishma of their survival. While in hiding in the forests, Yudhishthira permitted Bhima to marry Hidimba, a rakshasi they encountered. Later, Arjuna defeated the gandharva Chitraratha in combat when the gandharva captured Duryodhana over misconduct, Yudhishthira counseled Arjuna to release the kind. Following this Yudhishthira appointed Dhaumya as his family priest. They then resided at a village called Ekachakra.

== Marriages ==
In the Mahabharata, Yudhishthira is recorded as having two wives. His most well-known union is with Draupadi, the princess of Panchala. Yudhishthira shares Draupadi with his four brothers in a unique marital arrangement. Additionally, Yudhishthira is married to Devika, who is only mentioned once in the entire epic.

During their exile, as recounted in the Adi Parva, the Pandavas grew restless in Ekachakra. Kunti suggested they move to Panchala. On their journey, they met the sage Vyasa, who narrated how the Panchala princess, Draupadi, born from a fire ritual and not a womb, was fated to have five husbands due to a past-life boon from Shiva. Disguised as brahmins, they then joined a caravan and lodged with a potter, begging for food. King Drupada had organized a svayamvara for Draupadi, setting a challenge: string a formidable bow and hit a target. Many barons, including Duryodhana, failed, but Arjuna, rising from the brahmins, succeeded, winning Draupadi’s garland. Yudhishthira and the twins left early to prevent their identities from being discovered. Returning to Kunti, they playfully called Draupadi their "alms," prompting her unintended command to share her. Horrified but resolute, Kunti stood firm. Yudhishthira offered Draupadi to Arjuna, but Arjuna deferred to the eldest. Mindful of Vyasa’s tale and their shared affection, Yudhishthira agreed to Kunti’s proposal. With Vyasa's persuasion, the Pandavas wed Draupadi, after gaining permission from Drupada, who was hesitant to allow.

Yudhishthira’s other wife, Devika, is mentioned briefly in the Mahabharata (Adi Parva, Chapter 90, Verse 83). She was the daughter of king Govasana of the Sivi Kingdom. In a conventional svayamvara, Devika chose Yudhishthira as her husband, and they had a son named Yaudheya. Unlike the widely narrated and polyandrous marriage to Draupadi, this union is a more traditional and individual arrangement, with scant details provided in the epic. (Note: According to Puranas, Yaudheya was also the name of the son of Prativindhya.[1] The Bhagavata Purana, as well as Vishnu Purana, mention Pauravi as one of the wives of Yudhishthira. A son named Devaka was born to this couple.[2])

== Ruling Indraprastha ==
Following Draupadi’s svayamvara, the Mahabharata recounts that news of the Pandavas’ survival reached Hastinapura, sparking surprise and joy (Adi Parva). Duryodhana pressed for schemes to undermine Yudhishthira’s alliance with Drupada, while his ally Karna advocated immediate war. Bhishma, however, asserted Yudhishthira’s equal right to the kingdom, proposing a partition, a stance Drona supported, urging reconciliation. Vidura emphasized Yudhishthira’s invincibility and Drupada’s support, swaying Dhritarashtra to summon him back. Vidura fetched Yudhishthira and his brothers, mother and wife, from Panchala, where he was courteously received, and upon returning to Hastinapura, the populace celebrated. Dhritarashtra granted Yudhishthira the Khandavaprastha—half the kingdom—which he accepted. Yudhishthira with Krishna's blessing worked with his brothers to transform the once dense forest of wild beasts and asuras. There, with Vyasa officiating, Yudhishthira established Indraprastha, a thriving capital.

Crowned king of Indraprastha, Yudhishthira began his reign. The divine sage Narada visited and, addressing the shared marriage to Draupadi, advised that she spend one year with each brother in turn, a rule Yudhishthira implemented to ensure harmony. Later, Draupadi bore him a son, Prativindhya, among her five sons with the Pandavas.

Arjuna and Krishna burned the Khandava Forest to expand Indraprastha, sparing the Asura architect Maya. At Krishna’s suggestion, Maya constructed a magnificent mayasabha (assembly hall) for the Pandavas, which he presented to Yudhishthira, narrated in the Sabha Parva. When Krishna departed for Dvaraka, Yudhishthira drove his chariot, replacing Krishna’s charioteer Daruka.

=== Rajasuya ===
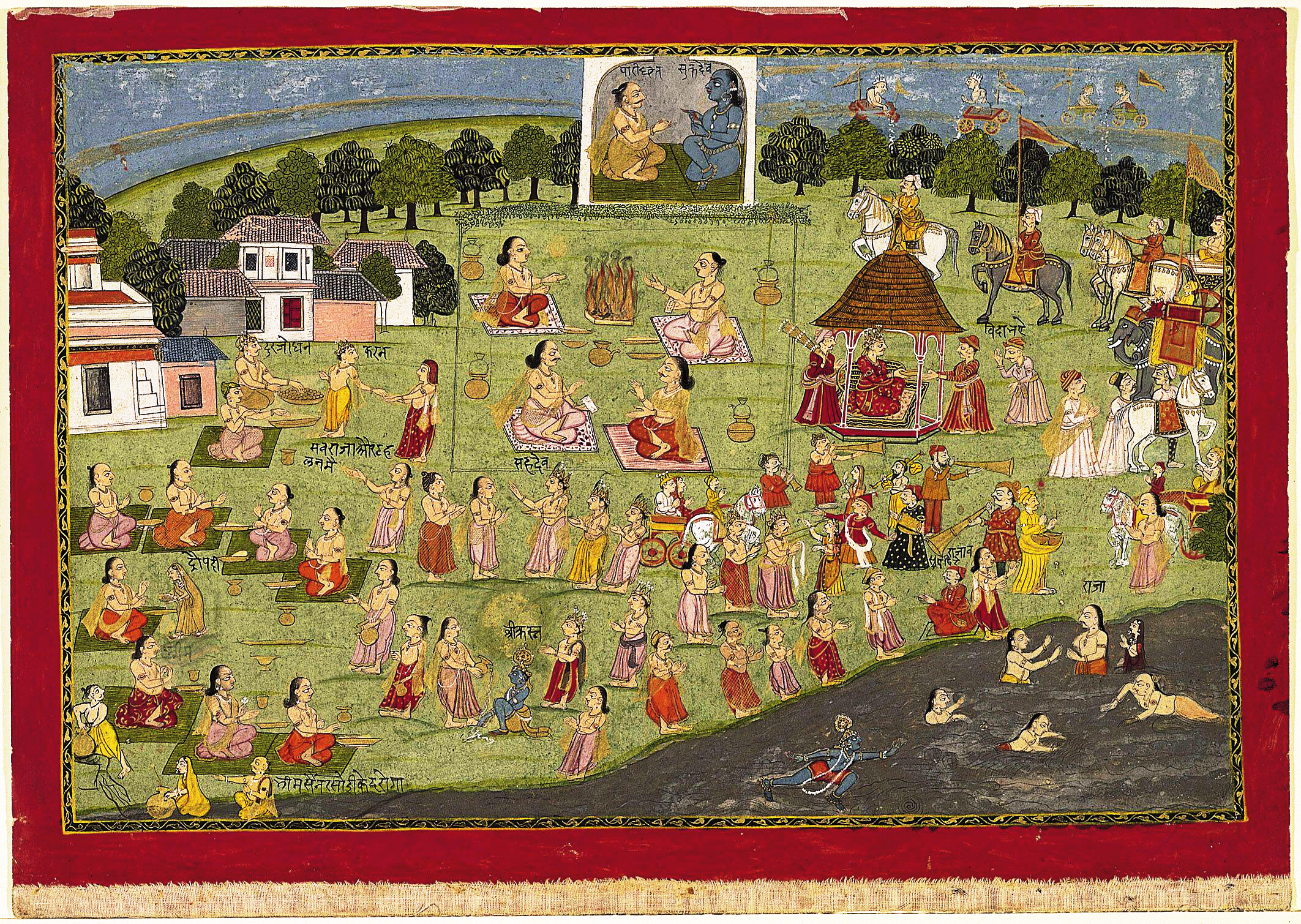
King Yudhishthira performs the rajasuya sacrifice

When Narada visited once again, he conveyed Pandu’s post-mortem wish for Yudhishthira to perform the Rajasuya, an ancient Vedic ritual of royal consecration, entirely narrated in the Sabha Parva. Initially a means to legitimize his kingship, the Rajasuya soon reflected Yudhishthira’s ambition to become samraj—an “all-king” or universal sovereign—to whom all princes would submit. Encouraged by his brothers, ministers, and Krishna, Yudhishthira considered the proposal. Krishna suggested eliminating Jarasandha, the Magadha king obstructing Yudhishthira’s supremacy. Yudhishthira dispatched his brothers on a Digvijaya (conquest): Arjuna to the north, Bhima to the east, Nakula to the west, and Sahadeva to the south, subduing rival kings and securing tribute. These victories established Yudhishthira’s dominance, prompting him to order the Rajasuya.

Vyasa arrived to oversee the sacrifice, assembling priests and sanctifying the opulent sacrificial site, built to reflect Yudhishthira’s sovereignty. Yudhishthira instructed Sahadeva to summon kings and Brahmins, dispatching messengers across the realms subdued in the Digvijaya. Nakula invited their Hastinapura kinsmen, the Kauravas, who accepted and attended. Yudhishthira was inaugurated as the sacrificer, and arriving guests—kings, princes, and Brahmins—were housed and feasted lavishly in Indraprastha’s quarters. The assembled kings offered great gifts. Yudhishthira, unsure of the primary honor (agra-puja), accepted Bhishma’s proposal of Krishna, sparking dissent from Shishupala of Chedi. Shishupala’s challenge escalated into a confrontation, ending with Krishna beheading him. Yudhishthira was consecrated samraj, achieving temporal supremacy. However, the hall’s magnificence and the yagna stirred envy in Duryodhana.

== The game of dice ==
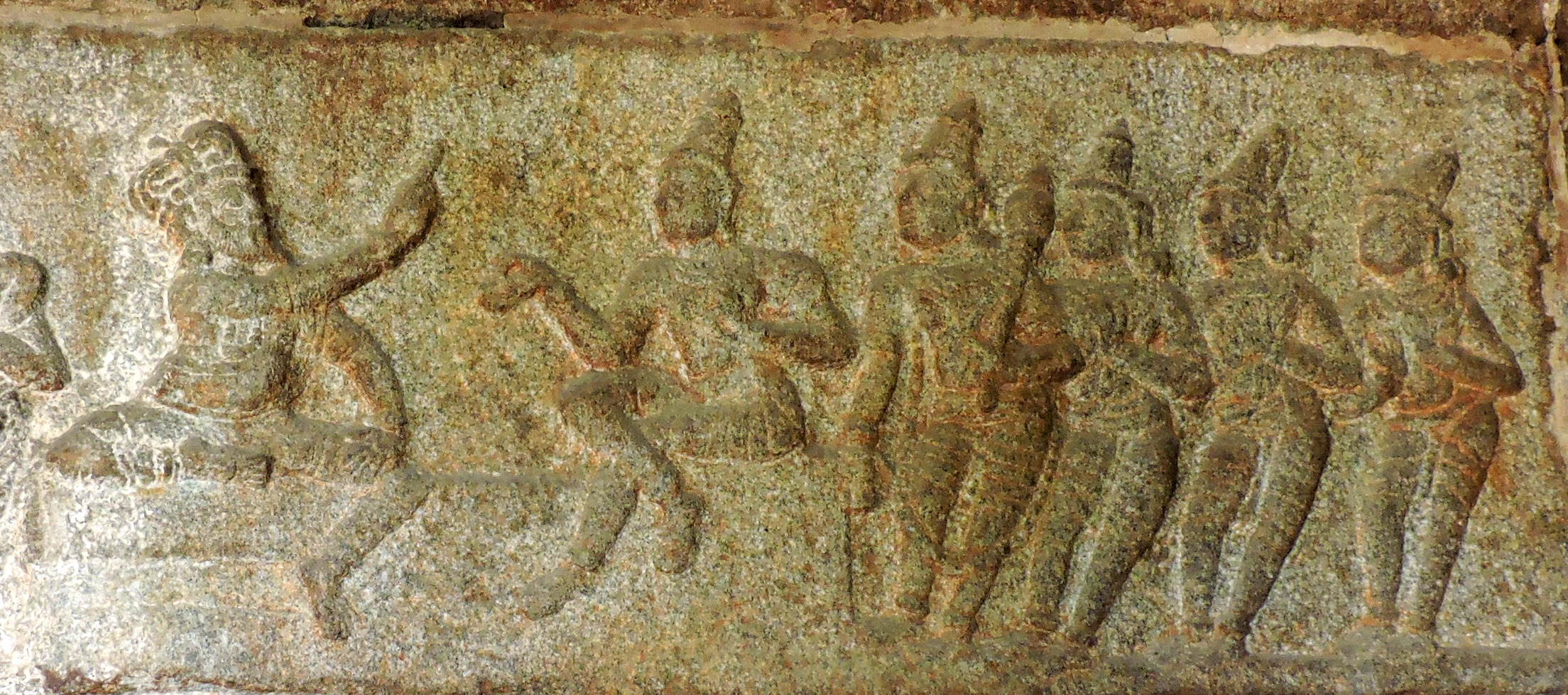
A relief at Lepakshi Temple depicting the dice-match between Shakuni (left) and Yudhishthira (right). The other Pandavas stand beside Yudhishthira

Following the Rajasuya sacrifice, Yudhishthira’s reign faced a pivotal challenge with the game of dice in Hastinapura, narrated in the Sabha Parva. Dhritarashtra, at Duryodhana and Shakuni's urging, invited Yudhishthira to Hastinapura for a dice match against Duryodhana. Despite Vidura’s warnings and his own misgivings, Yudhishthira accepted, citing kshatriya dharma (duty to accept challenges), kula dharma (obedience to elders), and the inevitability of fate (daiva and Dhatr). Learning that Shakuni, a skilled dice player, would roll for Duryodhana, he proceeded nonetheless, entering the contest with unease. In the sabha, Yudhishthira wagered incrementally, losing his wealth, lands, brothers, and himself to Shakuni’s expertise. At Shakuni’s suggestion, he then staked Draupadi, losing her as well. Draupadi protested, arguing that Yudhishthira, having lost himself, lacked authority to wager her—a claim debated amidst insults from Karna, Duryodhana, and Duhshasana. Bhima angered, wished to burn Yudhishthira's hands. Alarmed by her ordeal and ominous signs, Dhritarashtra intervened, granting her boons and annulling the match, restoring the Pandavas’ losses.

Duryodhana, fueled by envy of Indraprastha’s splendor, persuaded Dhritarashtra to recall Yudhishthira for a second, decisive game. The stake was set: thirteen years of exile, including one in hiding, with Draupadi included. Yudhishthira lost again to Shakuni, and this time, Draupadi accepted the outcome without protest . The Pandavas, stripped of their kingdom, departed for exile, marking the downfall of Yudhishthira’s samraj status.

Yudhishthira’s decision to play puzzled observers. He later explained to Vidura that duty compelled him, yet he admitted to Bhima a desire to claim Duryodhana’s half of the kingdom, driven by overconfidence (Sabha Parva, 3.35.1–5). When Shakuni’s skill became evident, anger spurred him to continue rather than withdraw. Some scholars link the dice game to Vedic Rajasuya traditions, though the Mahabharata does not explicitly connect them. Yudhishthira's staking of Draupadi, after losing himself, drew Shakuni’s rebuke—“Self-loss is wicked when a stake remains”—highlighting a lapse in responsibility.

== Exile ==
=== Obtaining the Akshaya Patra ===
Some time after going to the forests, Yudhishthira became troubled upon realising that he was unable to feed the Brahmanas who followed him to the forests. On the advice of his priest, Sage Dhaumya, Yudhishthira stood in river and appeased Surya, the Sun god, by reciting his 108 names. The god gifted a copper plate, the Akshaya Patra, to Yudhishthira, saying that any food cooked in that vessel would be inexhaustible, until Draupadi finished her daily meal. He also blessed Yudhishthira that the latter would regain his kingdom fourteen years later.

=== Tale of Nala and Damayanti ===
Sage Vyasa imparts the Pratismriti to Yudhishthira and tells him to pass it down to Arjuna. On Vyasa's advice, Yudhishthira permits Arjuna to perform penance in the Himalayas and obtain celestial weapons from the gods. During Arjuna's absence, Sage Brihadashva consoles Yudhishthira by narrating the story of Nala and Damayanti. Brihadashva advises Yudhishthira not give in to misery despite the wretched conditions he lives in. At the end of the story, Yudhishthira received a mantra from the sage, which makes him a master of gambling.

=== Yudhishthira and Nahusha ===
One day, while Bhima was roaming the forests, he was captured by a giant serpent, who suppressed the Pandava's might with his gaze. Meanwhile, a worried Yudhishthira searched for Bhima and found him at the mercy of the snake. To Yudhishthira's shock, the snake introduces itself to be the ancient King Nahusha, the father of Yayati, and the legendary ancestor of the Pandavas.

Nahusha posed questions on spirituality to Yudhishthira and was satisfied with his answers. In turn, he also clarified Yudhishthira's doubts on some spiritual topics. Nahusha then narrated his story to Yudhishthira, on how he used to rule Svarga in the days of yore, how he became intoxicated with hubris, and how he turned into a snake due to the curse of the sages, Bhrigu and Agastya. Nahusha used his own story to warn Yudhishthira about the consequences of being arrogant.

Agastya and Bhrigu had prophesized that Yudhishthira would rescue Nahusha from his curse. After conversing with Yudhishthira, Nahusha regained his original form and returned to Svarga.

=== Yudhishthira and Markandeya ===
The ever-youthful sage, Markandeya, once visited Yudhishthira. He narrated many stories to Yudhishthira, including the characteristics of the Yugas, the story of King Shibi, and the story of Savitri and Satyavan. He also narrated the story of Rama to Yudhishthira, and discoursed on spiritual philosophy.

=== Yaksha Prashna ===
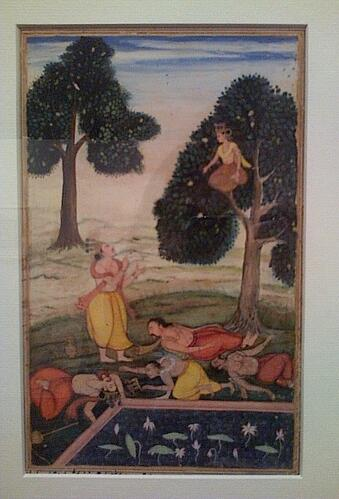
Yudhisthira answering the questions of Yaksha

During their exile, the four other Pandavas happened upon a lake, which was haunted by a Yaksha. The Yaksha challenged the brothers to answer his moral questions before drinking the water; the four Pandavas laughed and drank the water anyway. As a result, they choked on the water and died. Yudhishthira went in last, answered many questions put forth to him by the Yaksha. After the Yaksha was satisfied with the answers, he offered Yudhishthira the choice to bring back one of his brother, and Yudhishthira chose Nakula. When the Yaksha questioned him on his reasoning, Yudhishthira replied that he is still alive as Kunti's lineage, but there are no one alive as Madri's lineage, so he chose Nakula. The Yaksha was impressed again, and revived all of the Pandavas siblings.

The Yaksha asked for any other wish as he was impressed and told him he could ask for wealth, strength, power, anything he wished. Yudhishthira said he already got the strength, wealth and power when all his four brothers were revived and said he could not ask for any other wish. Yudhishthira replied, "It is enough that I have beheld thee with my senses, eternal God of gods as thou art! O father, whatever boon thou wilt confer on me I shall surely accept gladly! May I, O lord, always conquer covetousness and folly and anger, and may my mind be ever devoted to charity, truth, and ascetic austerities!"

This story is often cited as an example of Yudhishthira's upright principles. The Yaksha later identified himself as Yudhishthira's father, Dharma, and pointed them to the kingdom of Matsya to spend their last year of exile in anoymity.

=== Ajñātavāsa ===
Along with his brothers, Yudhishthira spent his last year of exile in the kingdom of Matsya. He disguised himself as a Brahmin named Kanka (among themselves Pandavas codenamed him Jaya) and advised the game of dice to the king.

Following the death of Kichaka by Bhima, Matsya was invaded by King Susharma of Trigarta, in retaliation to the raidings his kingdom had suffered by Kichaka, and in cooperation with Duryodhana of Hastinapur. When Susharma's army closed the kingdom, Kanka volunteered to follow King Virata to face the invader, and took along his three brothers, Vallabha (Bhima), Granthika (Nakula), and Tantripala (Sahadeva), with him and while disguised. On the battlefield, the brothers proved valiance, defending King Virata before finally defeating King Susharma.

While Yudhishthira and King Virata were away battling Susharma, the city was marched upon by the host from Hastinapur. Prince Uttar and Brihannala (Arjuna), who were left in defense of the city, rallied to defend the kingdom, where Arjuna revealed his identity and fended off the invasion. When King Virata returned from his battle, the identities of all Pandavas were revealed, and Yudhishthira congratulated the marriage between Princess Uttarā and Abhimanyu, as Arjuna has suggested.

== Kurukshetra war ==
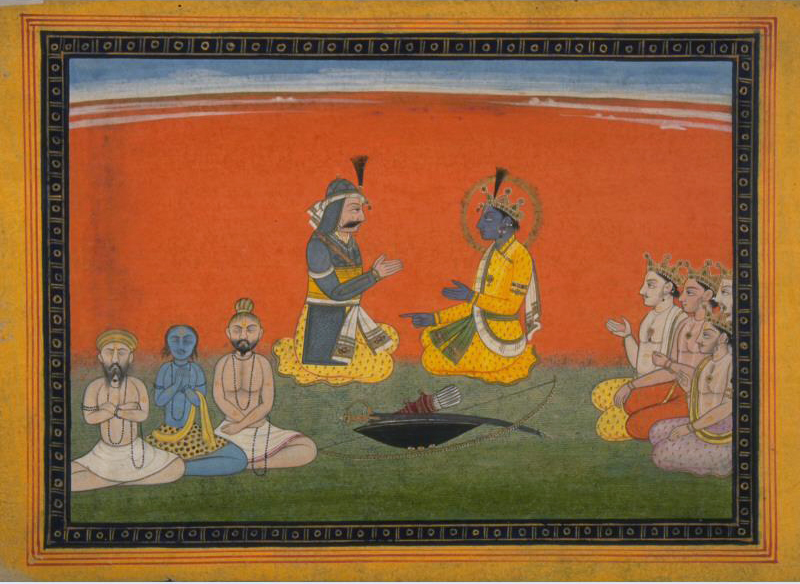
Krishna talking with Yudhishthira and his brothers, on preparation for war

When the period of exile was completed, Duryodhana refused to return Yudhishthira's kingdom. Yudhishthira made numerous diplomatic efforts to retrieve his kingdom peacefully but in vain. Left with no other option, Yudhishthira wages war.

The flag of Yudhishthira's chariot bore the image of a golden moon with planets around it. Two large and beautiful kettle-drums, called Nanda and Upananda, were tied to it. Before the war started, Yudhishthira stepped down from his chariot to take blessings from his grandsire Bhishma, teachers Drona and Kripa and uncle Shalya, who all were in his opposite side in the war showing his respect towards his elders. He also announced before the battle started, that all parties who wished to switch sides do so then. On his request one of Dhritarashtra sons, Yuyutsu joined the war on the side of Pandavas.

Yudhishthira was described to be an excellent javelin-fighter and to have surpassed everyone as a car-warrior. Yudhishthira defeated many warriors in the war, like Duryodhana. Yudhishthira’s javelin originally belonged to Ishana which he would use to kill Shalya during the war. Yudhishthira also wielded a bow called Mahendra.

On the 14th day of the war, while Arjuna was busy searching for Jayadratha, Drona attempted to capture Yudhishthira but Arjuna would foil Drona's plans. Yudhishthira and Drona engaged in a fierce duel where Yudhishthira was ultimately defeated by Drona. Yudhishthira would later assist his nephew Ghatotkacha in slaying the asura Alambusha.

Yudhishthira would later defeat Duryodhana twice and the latter had to be rescued by Drona. Drona and Yudhishthira would engage in an archery duel which would end up as a stalemate. Yudhishthira would later be defeated by Kritavarma.

On the 15th day, Yudhishthira was approached by Drona, in the latter' inquiry on the death of his son Ashwatthama whom he heard to have died at Bhima's hand. Torn between his duty to cripple Drona and upholding his morals, Yudhishthira opted to half truth where he confirmed the death of Ashwatthama the elephant, but omitted the contextual part that it was an elephant and not his son. This was effective in the former purpose of crippling Drona, but also caused his own chariot to finally fall down to the ground, instead of slightly levitating as it had been before this incident. Yudhishthira was one of 5 individuals who witnessed Drona's spirit leaving his body.

On the 17th day, he injured Duryodhana badly and was about to kill him but decided to spare him on Bhima's advice who reminded him of his vow to kill Duryodhana. Yudhishthira would be defeated by both Karna and Ashwatthama.

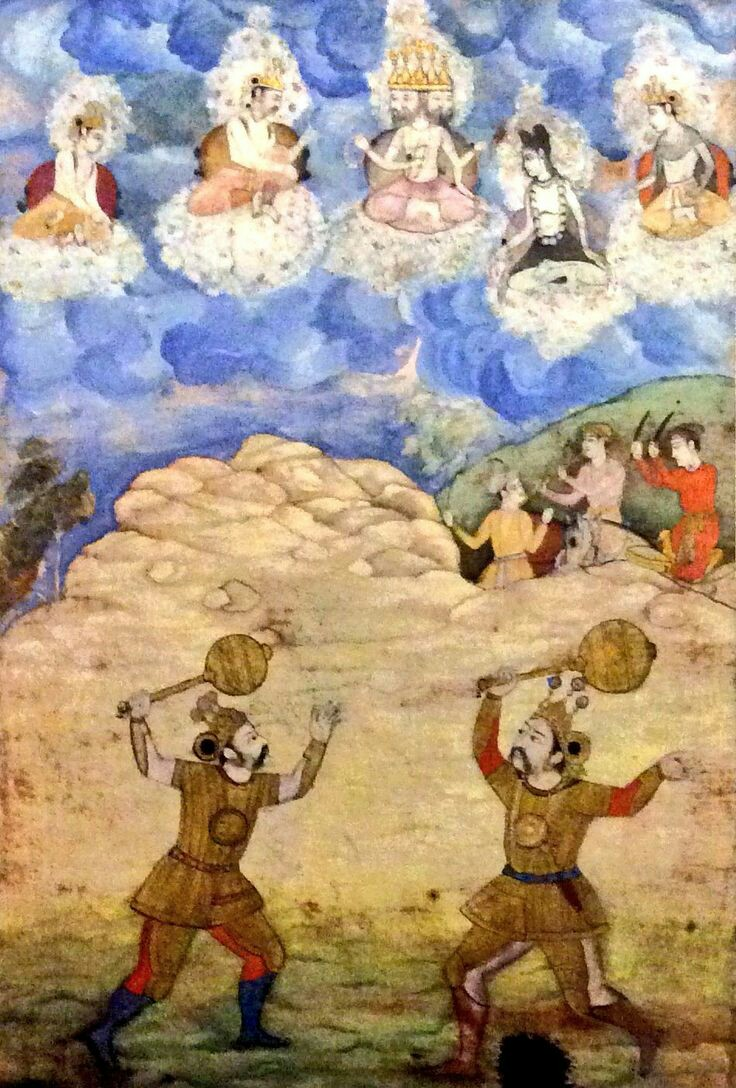
Bhima duels with Duryodhana.

Worried for Yudhishthira's safety, Arjuna retreats from the battlefield to search for him, only to find him taking refuge in camp. Furious at Arjuna for not killing Karna yet, Yudhishthira insults him by suggesting Arjuna should hand over the Gandiva to another warrior if he does not think he is able to slay Karna. Arjuna, enraged from Yudhishthira's insult, attempted to kill him with his sword but was stopped from doing so due to Krishna's intervention. Filled with regret, Arjuna attempted suicide but was dissuaded from doing so by Krishna. The brothers would reconcile their differences and embrace each other.

On the last day of the war, Yudhishthira was highly energetic for the day, and engaged in a fierce duel against the Kauravas' final supreme commander, Shalya. With Bhima's assistance, Yudhishthira managed to slay his uncle.

With the battlefield cleared of the Kauravas but no sight of Duryodhana, Yudhishthira received a report that his nemesis went into hiding in a nearby swamp. The Pandavas brothers and Krishna thus went to the swamp, and taunted Duryodhana off his refuge. Yudhishthira proposed a final challenge to Duryodhana, to a battle against any of the Pandavas under any weapon of Duryodhana's desire. Yudhishthira also promised Duryodhana that should he win, he would reign as the next King of Hastinapura.

With Duryodhana choosing Bhima, the other Pandavas brothers, Krishna and Balarama witnessed the mace duel between the mace fighters. When Bhima finally defeated Duryodhana and started insulting his nemesis, Yudhishthira became sufficiently displeased with his brother's disrespect and ordered Bhima off the battleground. Ultimately, Yudhishthira heard out Duryodhana's final conversation and lamentation, before leaving the fallen Kauravas' overlord on his deathbed.

On the advice of Krishna, Yudhishthira and the Pandavas brothers did not return to their camps. They were thus absent from the nighttime assault carried by the Kauravas survivors, led by Ashwatthama. The Panadavas showed up later to witness the massacre's aftermath, and the deaths of their sons by Draupadi. Stricken by grief, Draupadi asked her husbands to bring justice to Ashwatthama. The Panadavas thus chased Drona's son to the Rishi's encampment, where he took refuge. Yudhishthira then witnessed Ashwatthama's last stand and downfall, and afterwards, returned to Draupadi with proof of Ashwatthama's defeat.

=== Yudhishthira's curse ===
Aftermath of the Kurukshetra War Kunti reveals to Yudhishthira and all the Pandavas that Karna was her eldest son, born before marriage, through Lord Surya, by invoking the boon gifted by Durvasa, thus making Karna his elder brother. Yudhishthira overwhelmed with grief and regret for Karna, cursed all women with not being able to hide any secrets - "Thus addressed by his mother, King Yudhishthira, with tearful eyes and heart agitated by grief, said these words, 'In consequence of thyself having concealed thy counsels, this great affliction has overtaken me!' Possessed of great energy, the righteous king, then, in sorrow, cursed all the women of the world, saying, 'Henceforth no woman shall succeed in keeping a secret'."

== Reign after the war ==
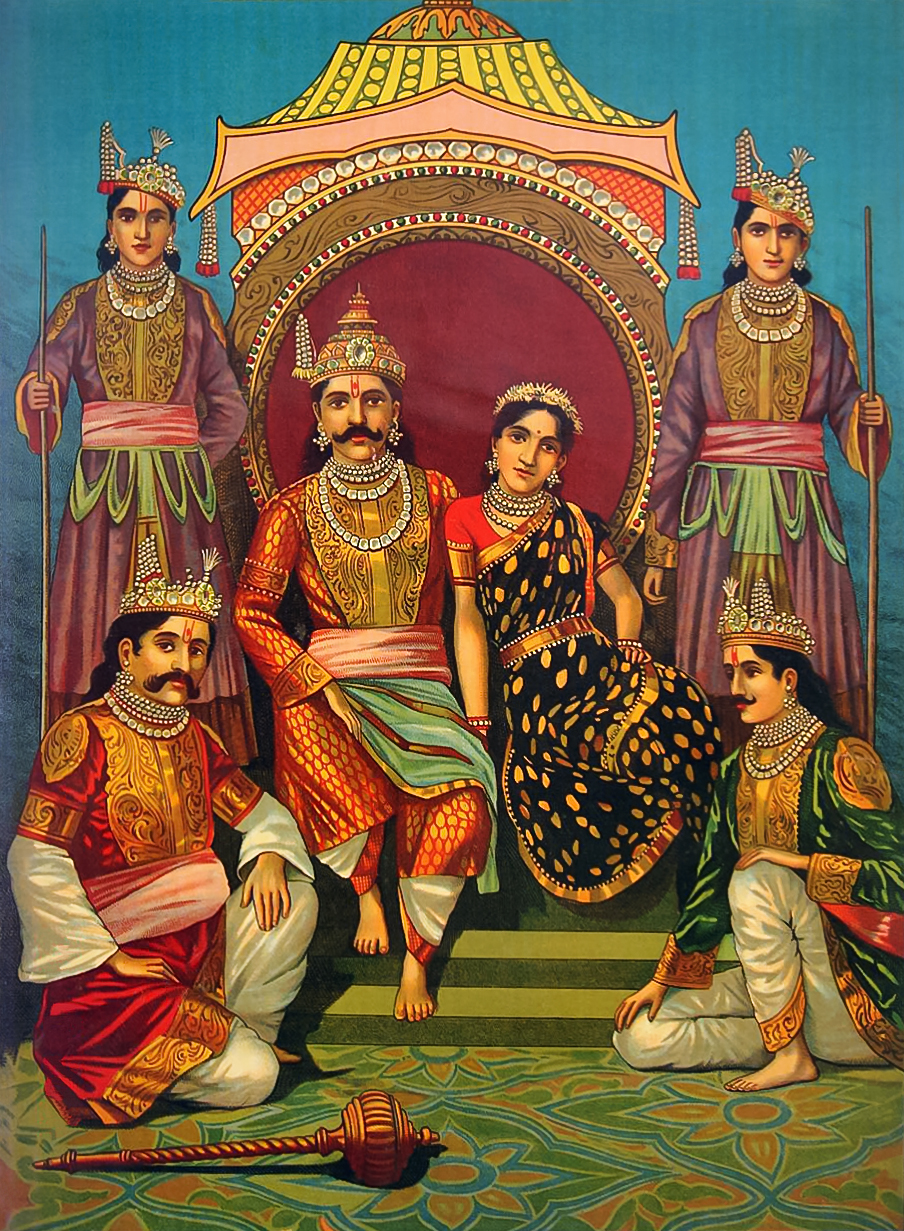
Yudhishthira (centre) and Draupadi seated on a throne, while the other Pandavas surround them, a print by Ravi Varma Press, c. 1910

After getting victory in the war, Yudhishthira did not wish to rule and instead wanted to retire to the forest. His brothers and Bhishma convinced him to accept the crown, and he reigned for 36 years as the Emperor of Hastinapura.

Fifty days after the war, Yudhishthira and the royal families visited Bhishma, who had been lying on the bed of arrows since his defeat. Bhishma bestowed the new king with Anushasana, teaching the new king in series of dharma and royal conducts, before the elder guardian surrendered his life by his own will. Yudhishthira then cremated the former protector of Hastinapur in a great ceremony.

Later, he performed the Ashvamedha on Krishna and Vyasa's insistence. In this sacrifice, a horse was released to wander for a year, and Yudhishthira's brother Arjuna led the Pandava army, following the horse. The kings of all the countries where the horse wandered were asked to submit to Yudhishthira's rule or face war. All paid tribute, once again establishing Yudhishthira as the undisputed Emperor of Bharatavarsha.

During his reign, Yudhisthira duly consulted with and reported to Dhritarashtra on governances. After 15 years, the former king, his consort Gandhari, Queen Mother Kunti, and Prime Minister Vidura decided to retire to the forest, where they passed away years later in a forest fire. These events greatly saddened Yudhishthira and the Pandavas brothers.

== Retirement and ascent to heaven ==
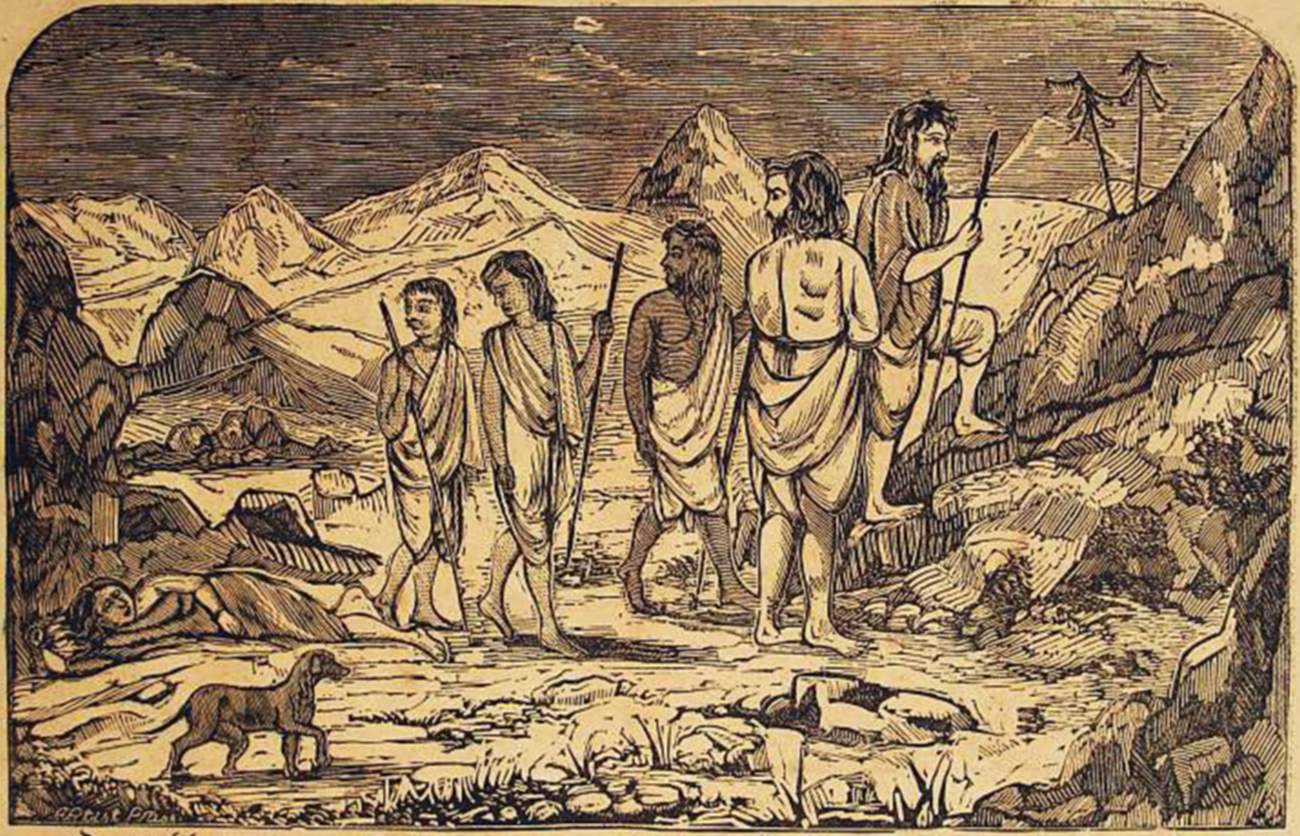
Draupadi dies as the Pandavas journey to heaven.

Upon the onset of the Kali Yuga and the departure of Krishna, Yudhishthira and his brothers retired, leaving the throne to their only descendant to survive the war of Kurukshetra, Arjuna's grandson, Parikshit. Giving up all their belongings and ties, the Pandavas, accompanied by a dog, made their final journey of pilgrimage to the Himalayas towards Mount Meru. During their pilgrimage, each one starting with Draupadi, fell down dead upon the mountains. Yudhishthira cites Draupadi's partiality for Arjuna, Sahadeva's pride in his wisdom, Nakula's vanity in his beauty, Arjuna's boastfulness of his archery, and Bhima's negligence of the needs of others while eating as the reasons for their fall. Finally, it was Yudhishthira who was able to reach the top, with the dog accompanying him.

Yudhishthira and his dog greeted by Indra and Matali during their ascent to heaven.

On reaching the top, Indra arrives in a chariot with Mātali and congratulates Yudhishthira and promises him immortality and godhood upon his ascent to Heaven. However, Indra asks him to abandon the dog before entering Heaven. But Yudhishthira refused to do so, citing the dog's unflinching devotion as a reason. Indra retorts that he has abandoned his brothers and wife to reach the top of the Himalayas, but Yudhishthira said he could not prevent their deaths, but to abandon a poor creature was a great sin. It turns out that the dog was his father Yama in disguise. Yama congratulates his son and commends him on his unwavering principles. Yudhishthira proceeds to Heaven upon a celestial vehicle with Narada as his guide, who informs him that he is the first mortal to enter Heaven in a physical form.

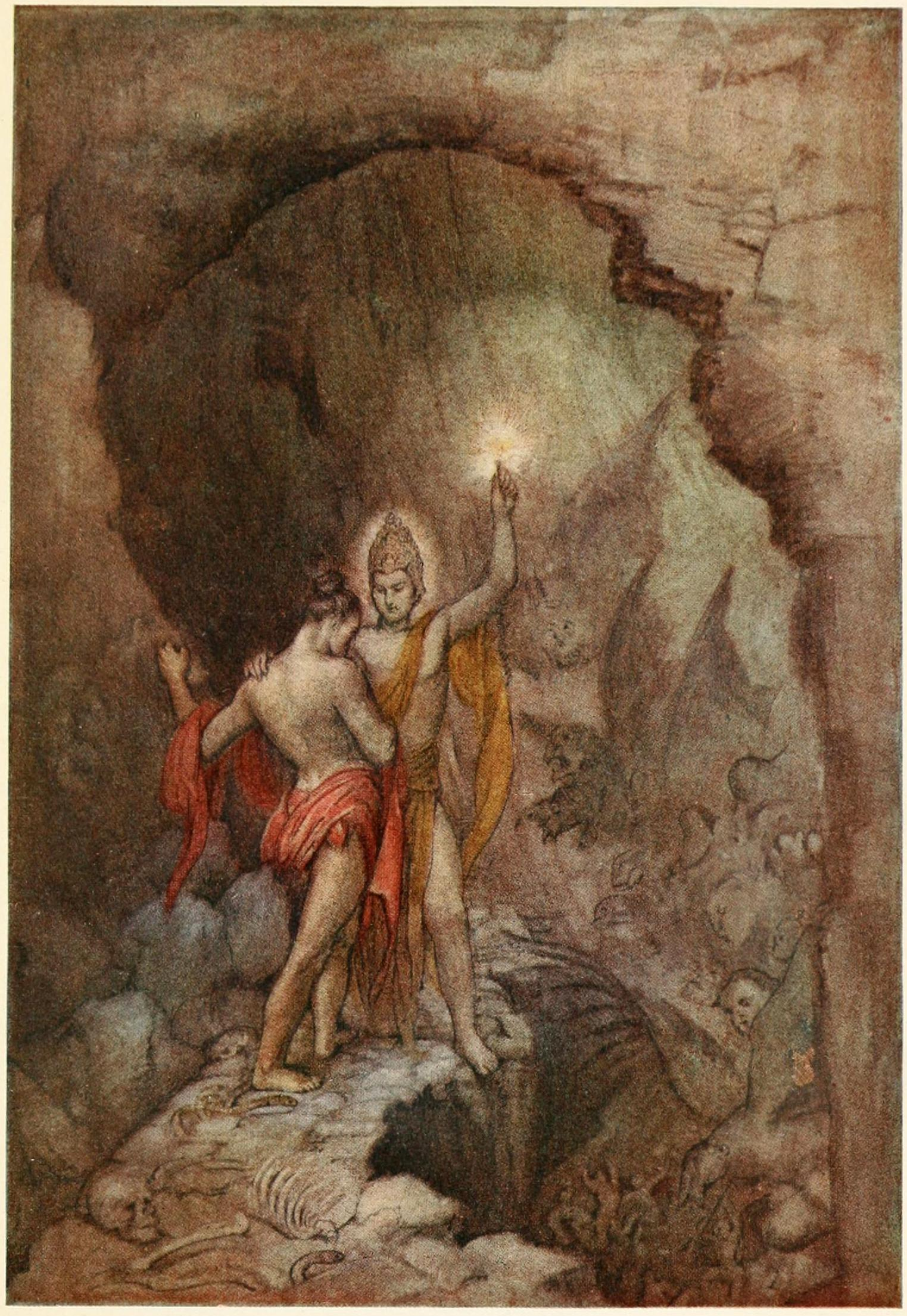
Indra lifts the illusion and reveals the truth to Yudhishthira.

Upon his arrival, Yudhishthira finds Duryodhana and his Kaurava cousins in heaven but not his brothers and Draupadi. Furious, Yudhishthira demands that Narada take him to where he might find his family. Narada brings Yudhishthira to Hell where he encounters Karna, his brothers, Draupadi, Dhrishtadyumna, and the Upapandavas. Yudhishthira, enraged, decides that he would rather live in Hell with his family than in Heaven with his cousins. Indra then appears and lifts the illusion, informing Yudhishthira of his deception. Indra reveals that Yudhishthira has been shown a glimpse of Hell due to deceiving Drona with his white lie. Yama congratulates his son on passing his third and final test, the first being the Yaksha Prashna, and the second being his refusal to abandon the dog. Yudhishthira would then bathe in the Heavenly Ganga, casting off his mortal form and was reunited with his family in Svarga.

== Assessment ==
Yudhishthira was master in javelin-fighting and chariot racing, alongside being a skilled archer. Yudhishthira was a polyglot, knowing unusual languages. After being exiled by Duryodhana, Yudhishthira became adept at controlling the dice after learning a mantra from Sage Brihadashwa. He was a hero known for his honesty, justice, sagacity, tolerance, good behavior and discernment.

Yudhishthira could burn down anyone into ashes when he sees someone with his wrath and anger. That's why he used to be calm and composed most of the time. He closed his eyes and came out of the gambling hall even when he lost everything. Otherwise the entire Kuru court and all the one who were present would be burnt into ashes.

Dhritarashtra said to Sanjaya "The son of Kunti and Pandu, Yudhishthira, is virtuous and brave and eschews deeds that bring on shame. Endued with great energy, he hath been wronged by Duryodhana. If he were not high-minded, they would in wrath burn the Dhritarashtras. I do not so much dread Arjuna or Bhima or Krishna or the twin brothers as I dread the wrath of the king, O Suta, when his wrath is excited. His austerities are great; he is devoted to Brahmacharya practices. His heart's wishes will certainly be fulfilled. When I think of his wrath, O Sanjaya, and consider how just it is, I am filled with alarm."
