= Pinaka (Hinduism) =

Celestial bow of Shiva

The Pinaka (Sanskrit: पिनाक, pināka) is the celestial bow of the Hindu deity, Shiva. In popular legend, he is believed to have employed this bow in his avatar as Tripurantaka to annihilate the three cities of Mayasura, known as Tripura. The weapon is the origin of one of Shiva's epithets, Pinākapāṇi, literally meaning, 'The Wielder of The Pināka'. According to Valmiki Ramayana, Dasharathaputra Rama received this bow, Pinaka, from Rishi Vishvamitra during his exile.

== Literature ==
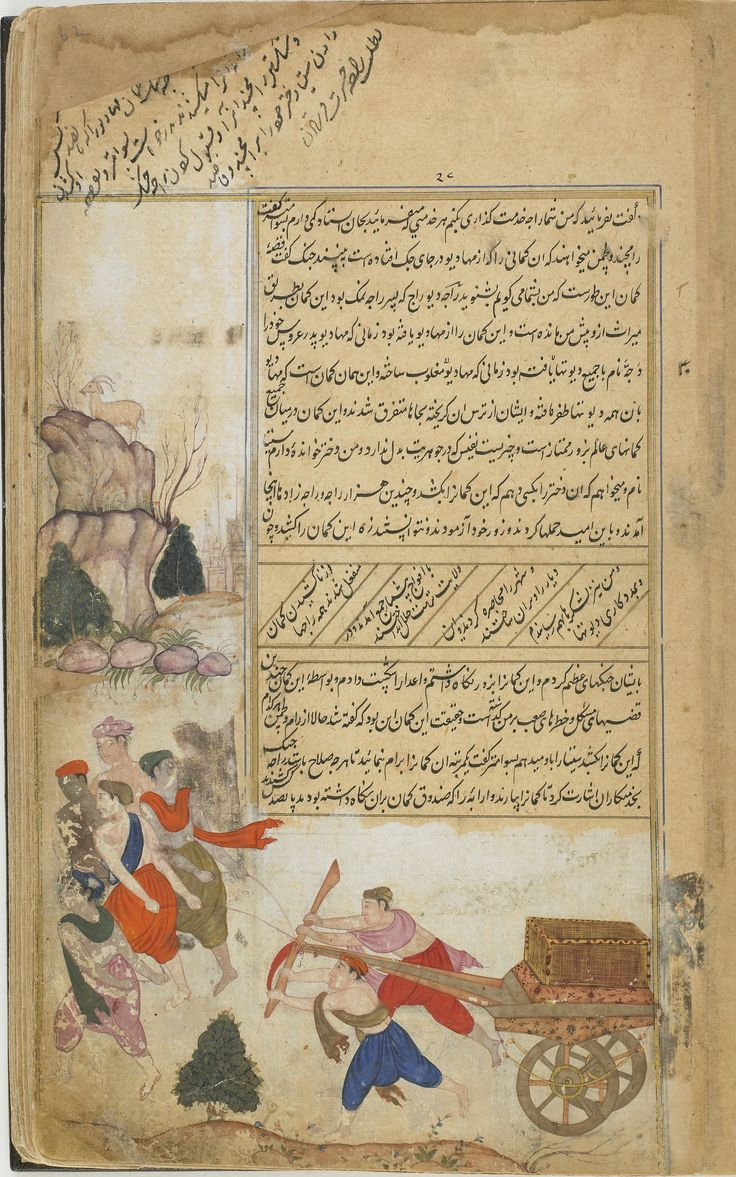
Hundreds of men bring the cart with the chest containing the great bow of Janaka

The first mention of the pinaka is In the Taittirīya and Vājasneyi Samhitas of the Krishna and Shukla Yajurveda respectively. Here, Rudra is called as Pinākahasta (one who has the Pināka bow in his hands) and Pinākavāsa (The one who wears the Pināka bow as an ornament).

In the Shiva Purana, Shiva employed the Pinaka in his duel against Ganesha, who had been appointed to stand guard while his mother Parvati bathed.

In the Harivamsa Purana, when the Prajapati Daksha performed a yajna for the gods, his ceremony was obstructed by Shiva and a human incarnation of Nandi, who wielded the Pinaka. Hari (Vishnu) stood to confront him, accompanied by the adityas and the vasus. Shiva struck Hari on his breast, who countered by grabbing his assailant's throat. When he strung his own bow Sharanga, the mountain Meru trembled. Infuriated, Nandi raised the Pinaka and struck Hari on the head, who stupefied the man with a smile and stood firm, allowing the yajna to resume.

In the Padma Purana, Shiva employed the Pinaka to combat Jalandhara:

Having heard these words of Brahma, Śiva knew (the illusion). Knowing the demon’s illusion, he threw a large rock (at the demons). With that he killed three hundred crores of demons. O king, then having very angrily mounted upon his bull (i.e. Nandin), Śiva took his Pināka bow and arrows. Then the son of the Ocean (i.e. Jālandhara), seeing Śiva, free from the illusion, manifested quickly another group of illusions which deluded the lord of gods, which was very wonderful, which was very powerful. Jālandhara turned into (one) having a crore of arms and fought Śiva with trees, weapons and missiles; and he, the Ocean’s son, put the earth that was decorated with the red chalk into the intermediate space; and the Ocean’s son made the earth adorned with many charming temples of deities, full of various (kinds of) flowers. Celestial nymphs, more lovely than Menakā danced there. Śambhu, forgot (to fight) and instantly abandoned the bow, and deluded by (the sound of) musical instruments and songs and by the tāṇḍava dance of the lord of demons, started, being mounted upon the bull.

— Padma Purana, Chapter 18

When the Yadava forces invaded Sonitapura to rescue Aniruddha, Shiva and Kartikeya rushed to guard the city of the Shaiva asura, Bana. Krishna's Sharanga and Shiva's Pinaka were used against each other in the battle, the conflict ultimately won by Krishna.

The Pinaka is sometimes considered to be the weapon Shiva employed to destroy Tripura, even though other legends state that the bow used for the destruction of the three cities was fashioned from Mount Mandara:

Śiva had to make grand preparations for a fight with the Tripuras. He invoked half the strength of the devas to himself to make Śivaśakti (Javelin of Śiva) greater than Asuraśakti. The devas made Viśvakarmā construct a special chariot for Śiva. On the banks of the river Narmadā at a place which became renowned as Maheśvara Śiva stayed for a thousand years thinking about the fight with the Tripuras. He made the mountain of Mandara his bow, Vāsuki, the string and Viṣṇu his arrow. He installed Agni at the tip and Vāyu at the bottom of the arrow. Four devas stood as horses to his chariot. The earth itself was the chariot and all the animate and inanimate objects of the devaloka arrayed at different parts of the chariot. On the wheels stood the Aśvinīdevas and Cakrapāṇi stayed on the axle. Gandharvas took places on the spokes. Indra stayed on the bow and Vaiśravaṇa on the arrow. Yama took his place on the right hand and the dreadful Kāla on the left hand. Brahmā acted as the charioteer. Equipped thus, Śiva stayed in the godly chariot for a thousand years. When the three cities joined together in the sky Śiva split the cities by his three forked spike. Then he sent an arrow to the cities. Bad omens began to appear in Tripura. People became lifeless in the cities. Soon an arrow from Śiva burnt the cities and the Tripuras were burnt to death.

— Padma Purana, Chapters 31 - 34

== See also ==
- Sharanga
- Vijaya
- Gandiva
