= Asanbibi =

Folk deity

Asanbibi (Bengali: আসানবিবি) is a folk deity, mostly worshipped in southern Bengal, in conjunction with her six sisters, namely, Olabibi (the Goddess of Cholera), Ajgaibibi, Chandbibi, Bahadabibi, Jhetunebibi and Jholabibi. It is believed by some modern scholars that these seven deities, together known as the Satbibis (seven ladies) are transmogrifications of the Saptamatrikas (Brahmi, Maheshvari, Vaisnavi, Varahi, Indrani and others), but almost no similarity exists between the Saptamatrikas and the Satbibis. The collective worship of seven goddesses is even evidenced in prehistoric India by a terracotta seal found at Mohenjodaro, a major urban centre of the Indus Valley Civilisation located in Sindh, which depicts the image of seven women standing together.
