= Jholabibi =

Hindu deity

Jholabibi is a Hindu goddess and folk deity in Bengal, worshipped in conjunction with the Goddesses Oladevi (the Goddess of Cholera), Ajgaibibi, Chandbibi, Bahadabibi, Jhetunebibi and Asanbibi.
