= Mayasabha =

Legendary palace mentioned in Mahabharata

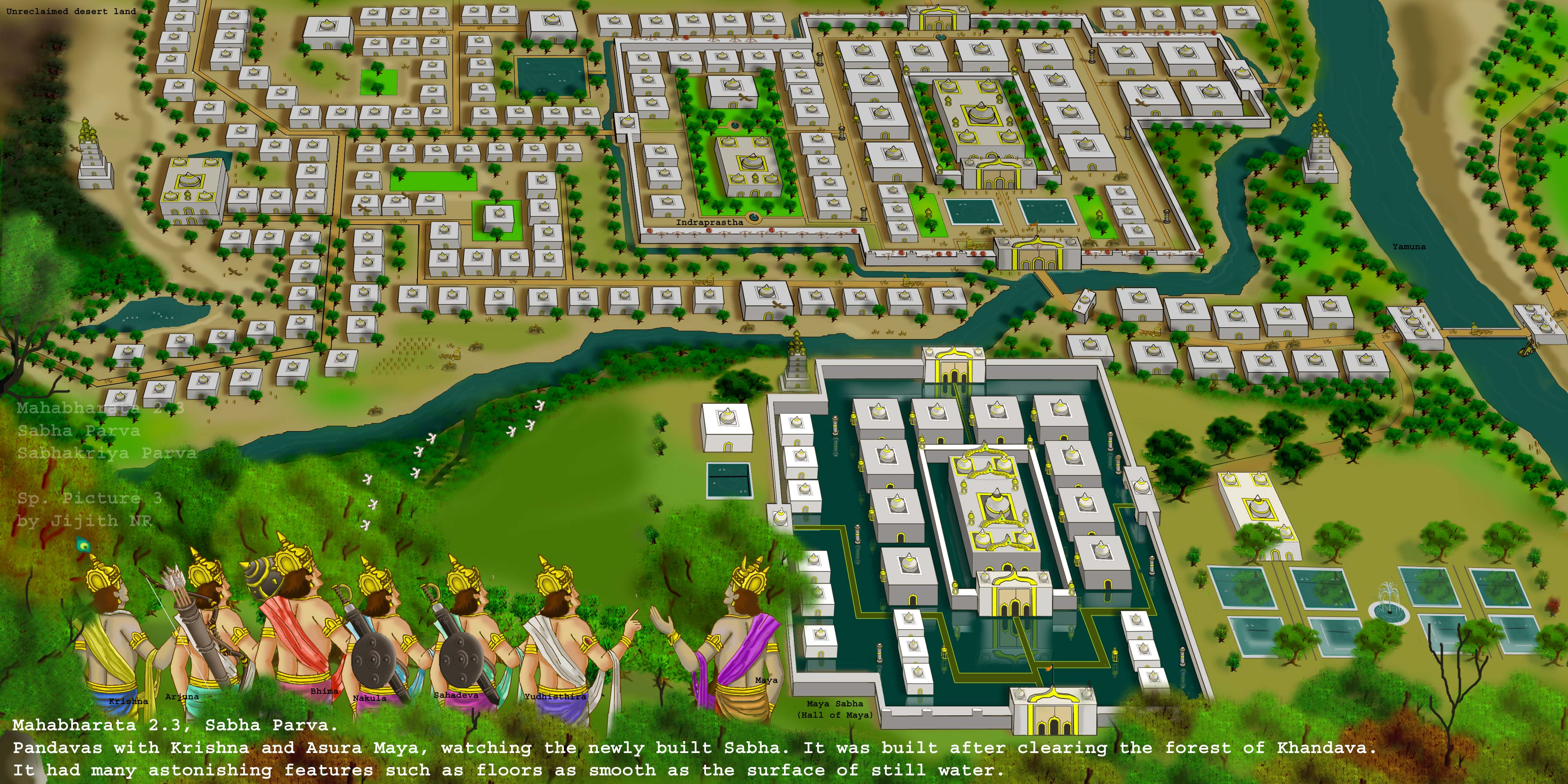
An artist's depiction of the Mayasabha

Mayasabha, also known the Hall of Illusions, is a legendary palace described in the Indian epic Mahabharata. Located in Indraprastha, it was constructed by Maya (also referred to as Mayasura), an Asura architect and king of the Danavas. Built for the Pandavas after their settlement in Khandavaprastha, the palace is renowned for its extraordinary beauty, intricate design, and symbolic representation of wealth, power, and divine favour.

== Background ==
Maya, the son of the sage Kashyapa and his wife Danu, was a master architect among the Danavas, renowned for his extraordinary craftsmanship and architectural prowess. Blessed by Brahma, he became a prominent figure celebrated for constructing magnificent structures for both the Asuras and Devas.

Maya's association with the Pandavas began during the burning of the Khandava forest (Khandavadaha), which Krishna and Arjuna offered as a feast to Agni, the fire deity. As the fire engulfed the forest, Maya, seeking refuge, was forced to flee. When Krishna aimed his Sudarshana Chakra at him, Maya, in fear, sought protection from Arjuna. Arjuna intervened, stopping Krishna and Agni, thereby saving Maya's life. Grateful for their mercy, Maya pledged loyalty to Arjuna and offered to repay their kindness.

Arjuna initially declined any reward, stating that saving Maya was sufficient. However, upon Maya's insistence, Arjuna directed him to Krishna. Krishna, recognising the opportunity, instructed Maya to construct a grand and unparalleled palace for Yudhishthira in Indraprastha. This palace, known as Mayasabha, would symbolize the Pandavas' rising power, divine favour, and prosperity.

== Construction ==
Maya undertook the construction of the Mayasabha with great devotion and meticulous planning. He selected a plot measuring 5,000 cubits square in Indraprastha, an area known for its beauty and favourable conditions. On an auspicious day, he performed rituals and made generous offerings to Brahmanas before beginning the work.

Mayasura sourced rare materials from various locations to construct the palace. These included treasures from Hiranya-sringa near Mount Kailasa and Vrishaparva's mansion, which was guarded by Yakshas and Rakshasas. In addition, he retrieved special gifts for the Pandavas, such as a celestial club for Bhima and the Devadatta conch for Arjuna.

Completed over fourteen months, the Mayasabha was a masterpiece of architectural brilliance. The palace featured golden columns, walls embedded with precious gems, and intricate designs that blended celestial and human artistry. The crystal floors of the palace gave the illusion of pools of water, while a jeweled tank, with golden lotuses and aquatic fowl, added to its splendour. Jeweled stairs enhanced its opulence.

The palace radiated a divine brilliance, rivaling celestial abodes like Sudharma and Brahma’s mansion. The Mayasabha stood as a testament to Mayasura’s architectural skill and the Pandavas’ growing prominence.

== Role in the Mahabharata ==
The Mayasabha became a symbol of the Pandavas' growing power and prosperity. Its extraordinary beauty and grandeur attracted admiration from across the world and showcased Yudhishthira's prominence. The palace served as the venue for significant events in the Mahabharata, including Yudhishthira's Rajasuya Yagna, which marked his assertion of sovereignty and elevated the Pandavas’ status.

During a visit to the Mayasabha, Duryodhana, the Kaurava prince, was humiliated after mistaking a still pool of water for a crystal floor and falling into it. This incident fueled his envy and deepened his animosity toward the Pandavas, further contributing to the events that eventually led to the Kurukshetra War.

== See also ==
- Tripura (mythology)
- Lākṣāgṛha
- Hastinapura
