= Tripurantaka =

Form of Hindu god Shiva

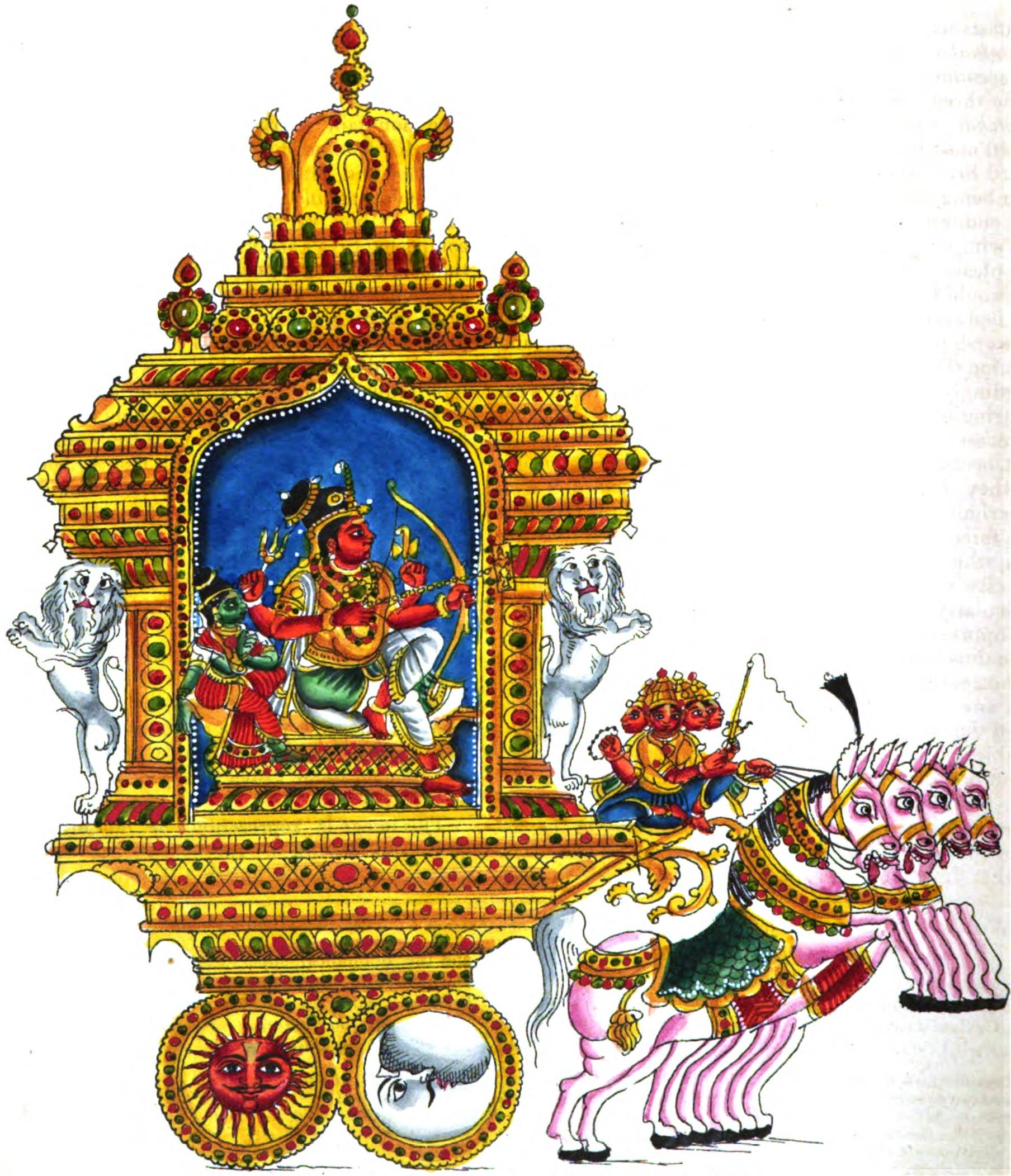
Depiction of Tripurantaka

Tripurantaka (Sanskrit: त्रिपुरांतक, romanized: Tripurāntaka) or Tripurari is a manifestation of the Hindu god Shiva. This form of the deity is featured in a Puranic legend in which he destroys the three cities of the asuras, called Tripura, with a single arrow.

== Legend ==
According to the Padma Purana, the asura Taraka had three sons named Tarakaksha, Kamalaksha (or Virayavana), and Vidyunmali. After their father had been killed by Shiva's son Kartikeya, the asura princes performed severe penance to appease the creator-god Brahma. Brahma, pleased, asked them for a boon. The brothers asked for immortality, but Brahma refused, saying that any living being must die one day. The brothers then asked for three indestructible cities, but Brahma said that the cities too must die one day, then the brothers asked that the cities may only be destroyed by Shiva when the Pushya Nakshatra is in conjunction with the Moon and the three cities are aligned in a straight line. This boon was granted Mayasura, the architect of the asuras, built the three cities. the first made of iron, located in hell, the second made of silver, located on Earth and the third, made of gold and located in Heaven. Many asuras flocked to Tripura and settled there. The boon granted the provision that the brothers would reign for a millennium. After several years of joy, the inherent evil tendencies of the asuras surfaced once again and they began to oppress the good and torment the noble. In the meantime, Mayasura was engaged in the worship of Shiva. The rest of the demons attacked sages and the devas and shattered the peace of the worlds. Finally, when Indra and the rest of the devas despondently approached Brahma for respite, Brahma redirected them to Shiva and also informed them of the vulnerability of Tripura to a single arrow. Shiva promised to help them and the devas returned to combat the asuras in war. They were also assisted by Nandi, the leader of Shiva's ganas. Even though Vidyunmali was slain by Nandi, and several other asuras were killed in the war, they were revived by water in the pool of Tripura, which had magical powers. Vishnu sent a saint named Arihat and his four disciples, who were versed in atheistic philosophies and acts, to convert the brothers to atheism, abandoning the worship of Shiva.

As the war raged on, the devas continued to struggle to fight the asuras, who used their magical powers to great effect. On the day the three cities aligned, Shiva ordered a chariot to be made upon which he would battle the asuras.

The war-chariot designed for Shiva consisted of deities: Bhumi – the Earth herself – became the body of the chariot, while Surya (sun) and Chandra (moon) formed its wheels, with Brahma himself assuming the role of charioteer. As for the weapon for the single shot: Mount Meru formed the bow; the serpent Vasuki, the bowstring; Vishnu, the arrow; Agni (fire), the arrowhead; and Vayu (wind), the feather fletchings. In a similar fashion, all the remaining devas each took their own forms and places in the cosmic chariot. As the cities aligned (the moon and the Pushya Nakshatra assuming the necessary configuration) and Shiva prepared to nock the arrow upon the bowstring, the devas rejoiced at the appearance of Shiva. In some versions, Shiva's wife Parvati is seated with him in the chariot.

When Shiva seated himself upon the chariot before heading off to war, the chariot was unable to move forward due to his cosmic weight. Coming to his aid, Vishnu assumed the form of a bull and pushed the chariot in motion. Once this had been done, he became the bull flag flying atop the chariot.

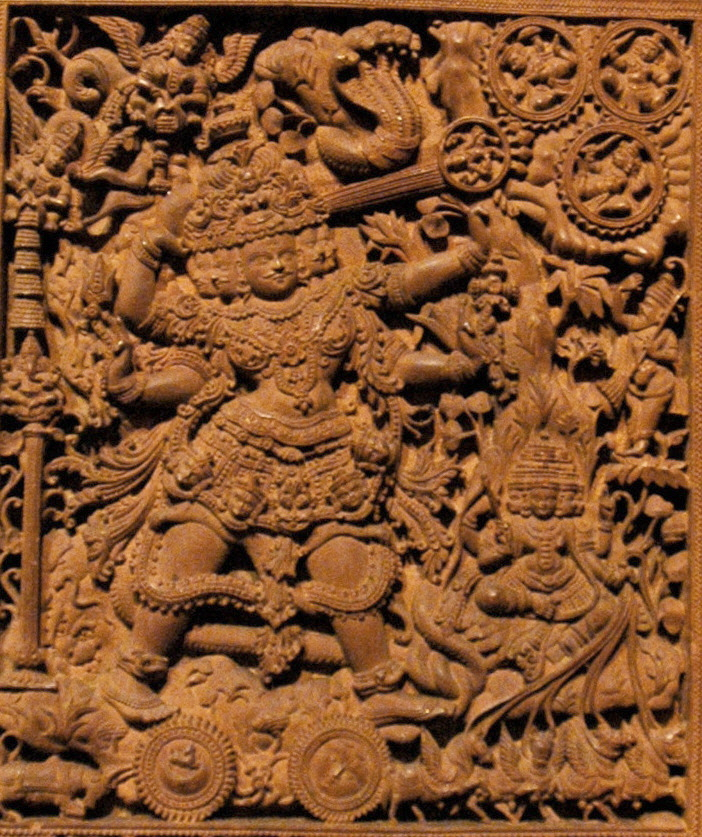
Here, the five-headed Shiva as Tripurantaka is seen pointing an arrow towards the Tripura (rightmost top corner) with the bow made of Mount Meru, the serpent Vasuki is seen as its string. The four-headed god Brahma is seen as the charioteer. The moon and the sun are depicted as the wheels of the chariot.

When the alignment time neared, Shiva shot the arrow, and all three cities instantly burst into flames. Awestruck by this effortless act of devastation, Brahma urged Shiva to forgive the devas for their pride.

Shiva immediately regretted his decision to release the arrow, since he had forgotten to protect Maya, a great devotee of his. Realising this, Nandi raced ahead of the arrow and informed Maya of the impending doom. Instantly, Maya fled Tripura, leaving behind the great city he had constructed, which was immediately reduced to ashes, along with its inhabitants. This destruction of Tripura, led to the appellation Tripurantaka (destroyer of Tripura), for Shiva.

With the three cities destroyed, Shiva stood upon the ruins and began to perform the tandava dance.

The legend is also featured in the Taittirīya Samhitā of Black Yajurveda:

The Asuras had three citadels; the lowest was of iron, then there was one of silver, then one of gold. The gods could not conquer them; they sought to conquer them by siege; therefore they say--both those who know thus and those who do not--'By siege they conquer great citadels.' They made ready an arrow, Agni as the point, Soma as the socket, Visnu as the shaft. They said, 'Who shall shoot it?' 'Rudra', they said, 'Rudra is cruel, let him shoot it.' He said, 'Let me choose a boon; let me be overlord of animals.' Therefore is Rudra overlord of animals. Rudra let it go; it cleft the three citadels and drove the Asuras away from these worlds. The observance of the Upasads is for the driving away of foes. One should not offer another libation in front; if be were to offer another libation in front, he would make something else the beginning. He sprinkles clarified butter with the dipping-ladle to proclaim the sacrifice. He makes the offering after crossing over without coming back; verily he drives away his foes from these worlds so that they come not back. Then returning he offers the Upasad libation; verily having driven away his foes from these worlds and having conquered he mounts upon the world of his foes.

— Yajurveda, Tattiriya Samhita, vi.2.3

== Significance ==
Stella Kramrisch's full analysis of the Tripurasamhara episode appears in Chapter XI.3 of her book, The Presence of Siva [Princeton University Press, 1981], in the section on "Cosmic Demons." In one part, Kramrisch speaks of the story as having "the body of man for its scene":

"the Asuras entered the bodies of men. Then pride, which destroys man's dharma, arose. From pride arose anger, then shameful behavior, then delusion." [in IX.3.iii of Kramrisch's book, "Tripura in the Microcosm," p. 411]

== Iconography ==
Tripurantaka is usually portrayed as an archer with four arms, his third (right arm) carrying the trishula, while the fourth (left) holding the damaru, in the other two he holds the pinaka bow releasing the pashupatastra missile on Tripura.

The earliest form of this can be seen in Pattadakal (belonging to Badami Chalukya period, 6-7 AD). Rashtrakutas also followed the same features as can be seen in Ellora, Kailasanatha Temple. Tripuranthakeshwara temple at Balligave is built by Kalyana Chalukyas. During Hoysala period, this story was presented in more detail and with beautiful ornamentation as can be seen in Hoysala temples at Javagal and Hosa Holalu. During this period, representing Tripurasura in 3 circular patterns began. This style is carried on by Vijayanagara sculptures and painters. One can see this depiction in murals at Virupaksha temple at Hampi.

In Hindu art, Tripurantaka is seen as a giant person of light showering light at the darkness which is known as "the destroyer of evil and darkness".

== Festivals ==
Tripurantaka had various festivals, mainly he is celebrated on Kartik Purnima, which falls under the month of Kartika. He is also worshiped on Maha Shivaratri as an important manifestation of Shiva.

Devotees offer prasad which are Hindu sacred offerings to the deity, Tripurantaka prayers are usually done on the day of Rudra yajna which he is seen as the protector of the universe.

An image of Tripurantaka is enshrined at Tiruvatikai near Chidambaram. The Veeratteswarar temple here is one of the eight Veerata sthalas celebrating Shiva as the destroyer of evil forces. Tripurantaka is also enshrined at Tiruvirkolam (Koovum) near Chennai.

== See also ==
- Tripura (mythology)
- Tripurantaka Temple

== Sources ==
- Dictionary of Hindu Lore and Legend (ISBN 0-500-51088-1) by Anna Dallapiccola
- Encyclopedia of Hinduism – Volumes on Shiva Ed. by Dr. Nagendra Kr. Singh (ASIN B09JWTPLCM)
