= Tripurasura =

Mythical trio of asura brothers

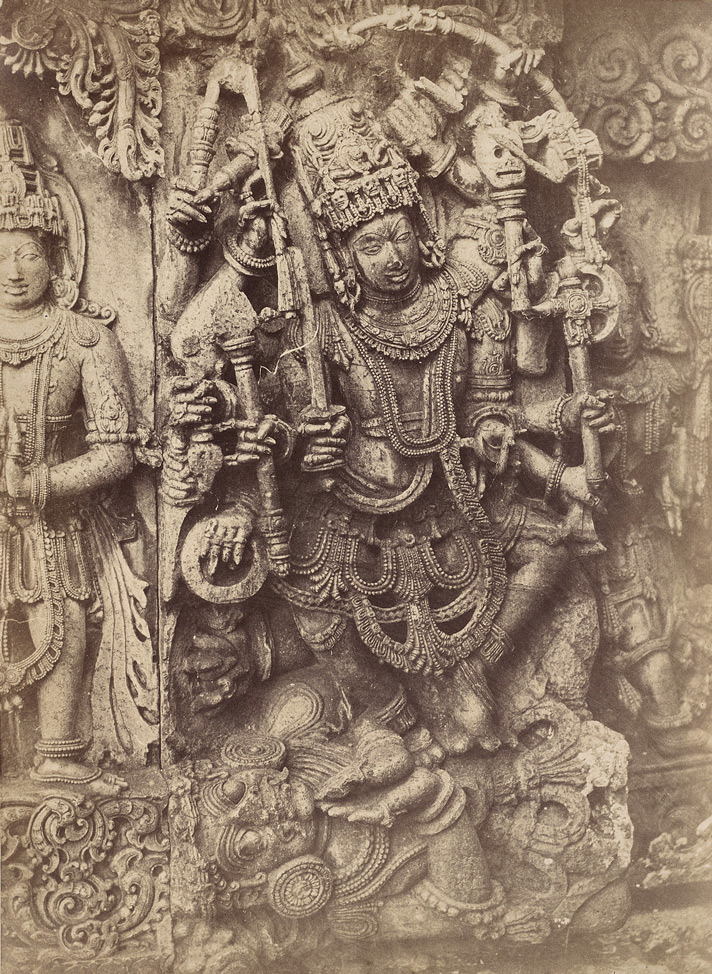
Shiva crushing Tripurasura; a sculpture found at Halebidu temple complex in Karnataka. Kartikeya is seen on left.

Tripurasura (Sanskrit: त्रिपुरासुर) is a trio of asura brothers named Tarakaksha, Vidyunmāli and Kamalaksha, who were the sons of the asura Tarakasura. These three began to perform severe tapasya. They were then granted boons by Brahma to have three forts: gold, silver, and iron, which angered the Devas. The asuras then migrated from path of dharma and turned evil, and the objective of killing the asuras was taken upon by Shiva, which took three days on the battlefield, finally killing Tripurasura and destroying the three cities. This occurred on the full moon day in the Kartik month and therefore the day is celebrated as Tripurari Pournima.

== Legends ==
=== Taittirīya Samhita ===
The legend of the Tripurasuras is first mentioned in the Taittirīya Samhita of the Krishna Yajurveda:

The Asuras had three citadels; the lowest was of iron, then there was one of silver, then one of gold. The gods could not conquer them; they sought to conquer them by siege; therefore they say--both those who know thus and those who do not--'By siege they conquer great citadels.' They made ready an arrow, Agni as the point, Soma as the socket, Visnu as the shaft. They said, 'Who shall shoot it?' 'Rudra', they said, 'Rudra is fierce, let him shoot it.' He said, 'Let me choose a boon; let me be overlord of Pashus.' Therefore is Rudra overlord of Pashus. Rudra let it go; it cleft the Citadels and drove the Asuras away from these worlds.

— Krishna Yajurveda, Taittirīya Samhita, 6.2.3 .

=== Itihāsas and Purānas ===
This legend is later told in the Itihāsas and Purānas with more detail.

The three brothers began to perform tapasya. They meditated for a hundred years, standing only on one leg. For a thousand more years, they lived on air and meditated. They stood on their heads and meditated in this posture for yet another thousand years. Brahma was pleased with this difficult tapasya. He appeared before them and asked them which boon they wanted. When Tarakasura's sons ask for immortality, Brahma declined to grant them that boon, saying that he did not have the power to do so, and suggested that they ask for a different boon instead. Tarakaksha, Vidyunmāli and Kamalaksha responded:

"Grant us the following: Let three forts be made. The first will be of gold, the second of silver and the third of iron. We will live in these forts for a thousand years. These forts built in different worlds shall align once in every 1,000 years. This combined fort will be called Tripura. And if anyone can then destroy Tripura with only a single arrow, that shall be the death destined for us".

Despite the boon's unusual nature, Brahma granted it and asked a skilled Danava builder named Maya to build the forts. The golden fort was built in heaven, the silver one in the sky, and the iron one on earth. Tarakaksha got the golden fort, Kamalaksha the silver one, and Vidyunmali the iron one. Each of the forts was as big as a city and had many palaces and vimanas inside.

The asuras populated the three forts and began to flourish, much to the gods' resentment. The gods first went to Brahma, who subsequently said he could not help them, as the asuras had gotten Tripura as a result of his boon. The gods then went to Shiva for help, but Shiva said that the asuras were doing nothing wrong. As long as that was the case, he did not see why the gods were so bothered. They then went to Vishnu, who suggested that if the problem was that the asuras were doing nothing wrong, then the solution was to persuade them to become sinners.

Out of his powers, Vishnu created a man. (Note: In later tradition, he is identified as Sugata Buddha) This man's head was shaven, his clothes were faded, and he carried a wooden water-pot in his hands. He approached Vishnu and asked him what orders he would be given, to which Vishnu replied:

"Let me explain to you why you have been created. I will teach you a religion that is completely against the Vedas. You will then get the impression that there is no Svarga (heaven) and no Naraka (hell) and that both heaven and hell are on earth. You will not believe that rewards and punishments for deeds committed on earth are meted out after death. Go to Tripura and teach the demons this religion, by which they will be dislodged from the righteous path. Then we will do something about Tripura".

The being did as he had been asked to. He and four of his disciples went to a forest that was near Tripura and began to preach. They were trained by Vishnu himself, so their teachings were convincing and they had many converts. Even the sage Narada got confused and was converted, after which he carried news of the new religion to King Vidyunmali. "King" he said, "there is a wonderful new teacher with a wonderful new religion. I have never heard before. I have been converted."

After Narada had been converted, Vidyunmali also accepted the new religion, and in due course, so did Tarakaksha and Kamalaksha. The asuras gave up revering the Vedas and stopped worshipping Shiva linga.

The gods then went to Shiva and began to pray to him. When Shiva appeared, they told him that the asuras had become evil and should be destroyed. Shiva agreed to destroy Tripura and called Vishvakarma, the architect of the gods, asking him to make a suitable chariot, bow, and arrow. The chariot was made entirely out of gold. Brahma himself became the charioteer, and the chariot was speedily driven towards Tripura. The gods accompanied Shiva with diverse weapons.

When Shiva's army reached the battlefield, the three forts were about to merge into a single Tripura for just a second. At that exact moment, Shiva invoked the most destructive weapon controlled by him, the Pashupatastra. With his capable arms, he fired a single arrow into the three forts at the exact instant they merged into one, burning to ashes the three forts of the asuras and earning Shiva the epithet Tripurantaka - the one who ended Tripura, and Paśupatinath - wielder of the Pashupatastra. He also earned the epithet Tripurari.

=== Other accounts ===
Another version that is widely quoted in Tamil literature has Shiva destroying Tripura with a mere smile. When all the battlefield was filled with warriors, with Brahma and Vishnu in attendance, there occurred the instant when the forts came together. Shiva merely smiled. The forts were burned to ashes. The battle was over before it began! In Tamil, Shiva has the epithet, "Sirithu Purameritha Peruman" which means, He who burnt the cities with a mere smile.

While the celebrations were going on, the shaven-headed religious teachers arrived. "What are we supposed to do now?" they asked.

Brahma and Vishnu told them to go to the desert, where no humans exist. In the desert, Tripurasura will reincarnate as a human, propagate the same ideology among humans, and establish a religion against the Vedas. The last of the four eras was Kali Yuga and during Kali Yuga, evil would reign supreme. When Kali Yuga arrived, they were to come back and begin their teaching afresh. And once they were at their peak, Vishnu would be reborn as Kalki and wipe them from earth, and once again the world would be free from all kinds of evil and asuras.

In Nepalese accounts, the three asuras are named Maya, Tarakāksha and Bidyutaprabha. They are given three cities through penance, which angers the gods who plead to Shiva to destroy them. The gods become various parts of Shiva's chariot, who then destroys the cities in a single moment. This episode is narrated in the Swasthani Brata Katha, a hindu holy text from Nepal.

== See also ==
- Adharma
- Atheism
- Nastika
- Mleccha
