= Chhapadeshwar Mahadev Mandir =

Ancient Shiv Temple in Haryana, India

Chhapadeshwar Mahadev Mandir is an ancient Shiv Temple located in Kharkhoda, Sonipat district. Each year, on the occasion of Mahashivratri a huge gathering of devotees takes place in the temple . According to the history books it was the part of Khandava Forest pandavas stayed in Mahabharata times.
