= Khandava Forest =

Ancient forest mentioned in Mahabharata

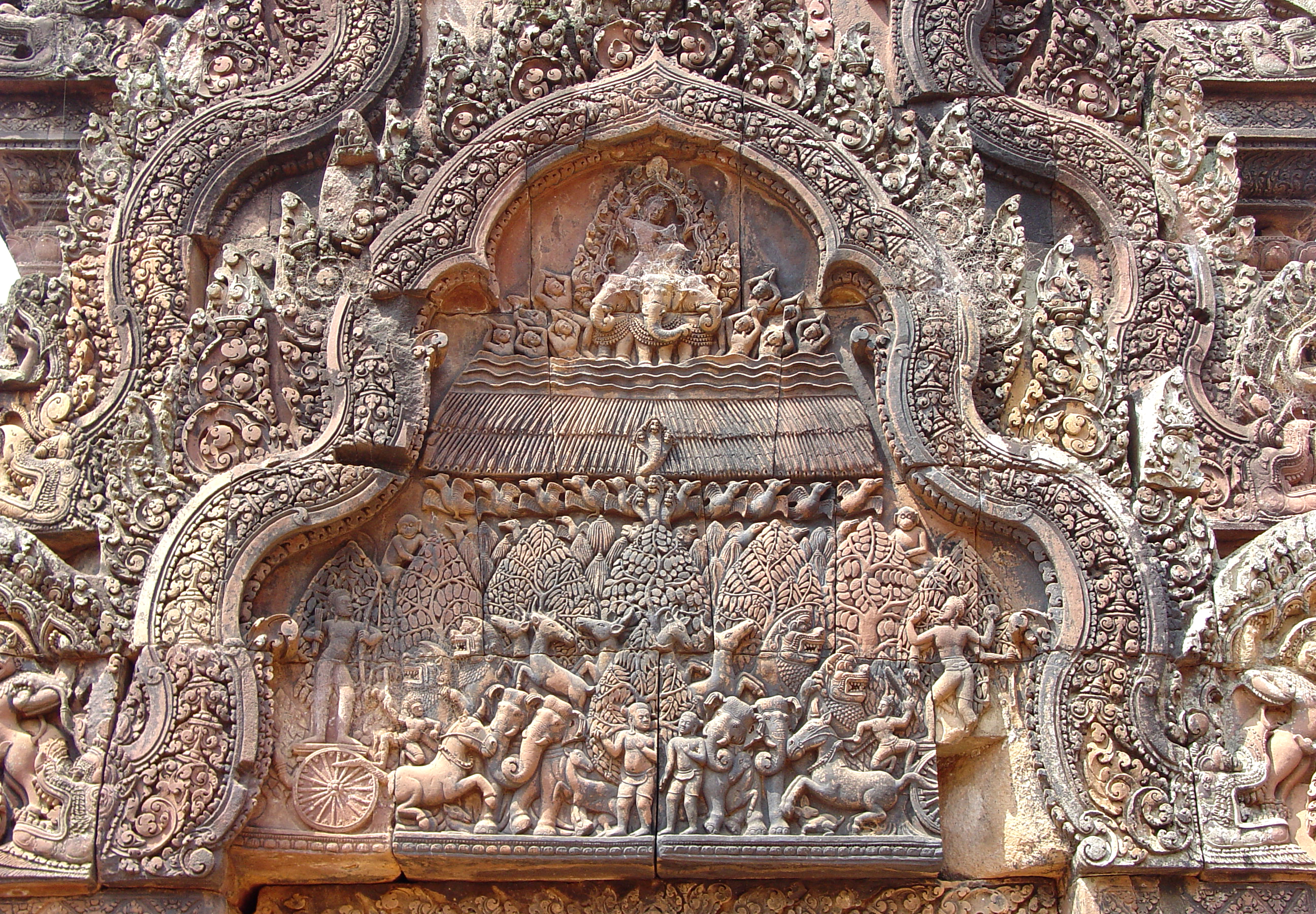
Relief at Banteay Srei. Burning of the Khandava Forest: Arjuna and Krishna aim Agni swallow the forest (bottom) by firing arrows at the rain, created by Indra (top) to stop the fire. Serpents (Nagas) try to escape the fire (middle).

The Khandava Forest or Khandava Vana (Sanskrit: खाण्डव वन, IAST: Khāṇḍava Vana) or Khandavaprastha (Sanskrit: खाण्डवप्रस्‍थ; IAST: Khāṇḍavaprastha) is a forest mentioned in the epic Mahābhārata. It lay to the west of Yamuna river. The Pandavas are described to have cleared this forest to construct their capital city called Indraprastha. This forest was earlier inhabited by Nāgas led by a king named Takṣaka.

Arjuna and Kṛṣṇa are stated to have cleared this forest by setting it afire. The inhabitants of this forest were displaced. This was the root cause of the enmity of the Nāga Takshaka towards the Kuru kings who ruled from Indraprastha and Hastinapura.

== Legend ==
According to legend, Agni, the god of fire, needed to burn down the forest so that he could satisfy his hunger. There was no other thing that would have satisfied his hunger. The Mahabharata states that Indra was the protecting deity (Deva) of Khandava forest, which is why the region was known as Indraprastha.

But each time he started a fire there, Indra made it rain and the fire was doused. So Agni disguised as a Brahmana, approached Krishna and Arjuna and asked for their help. When the forest was being burned, Indra attacked Arjuna with his bolt (Vajra), injuring him. But Arjuna and Krishna defeated all Devas, gandharvas, and asuras in that fierce battle, and burnt the entire forest.

All but seven living creatures were consumed by Agni. The seven living creatures that were saved from the fire were a naga named Ashvasena (Son of Takshaka), Mayadanava, and five Sarangakas (birds). The five birds were Jarita (wife of Rishi Mandapala) and their four children were Jaritari, Sarisrikka, Stambhamitra, and Drona.

Mandapala, who had earlier abandoned his family and left Khandava forest to live with his second wife Lapita, was instrumental in convincing Agni to save his estranged family from the conflagration. Takshaka's wife sacrificed her life to save her son Ashvasena, who later attempted to kill Arjuna during the Kurukshetra war by placing himself on one of Karna's special arrows. Takshaka later avenged the death of his relatives by becoming the reason of the death of Arjuna's grandson, Parikshit.

== Related places ==
The following regions are regarded to be associated with this forest, according to popular belief:

The Chhapadeshwar Mahadev Mandir in Kharkhoda, Haryana, was the part of Khandav Van.

The Khanda village, in Kharkhoda tehsil of Sonipat district, in Haryana state, was named after the Khandava Forest.

== See also ==
- Naimisha
- Indraprastha
- Mayasabha
