= Pattadakal (town) =

Pattadakal Raktapura, Pattadakal Kisuvoval, Petrigal
- Town
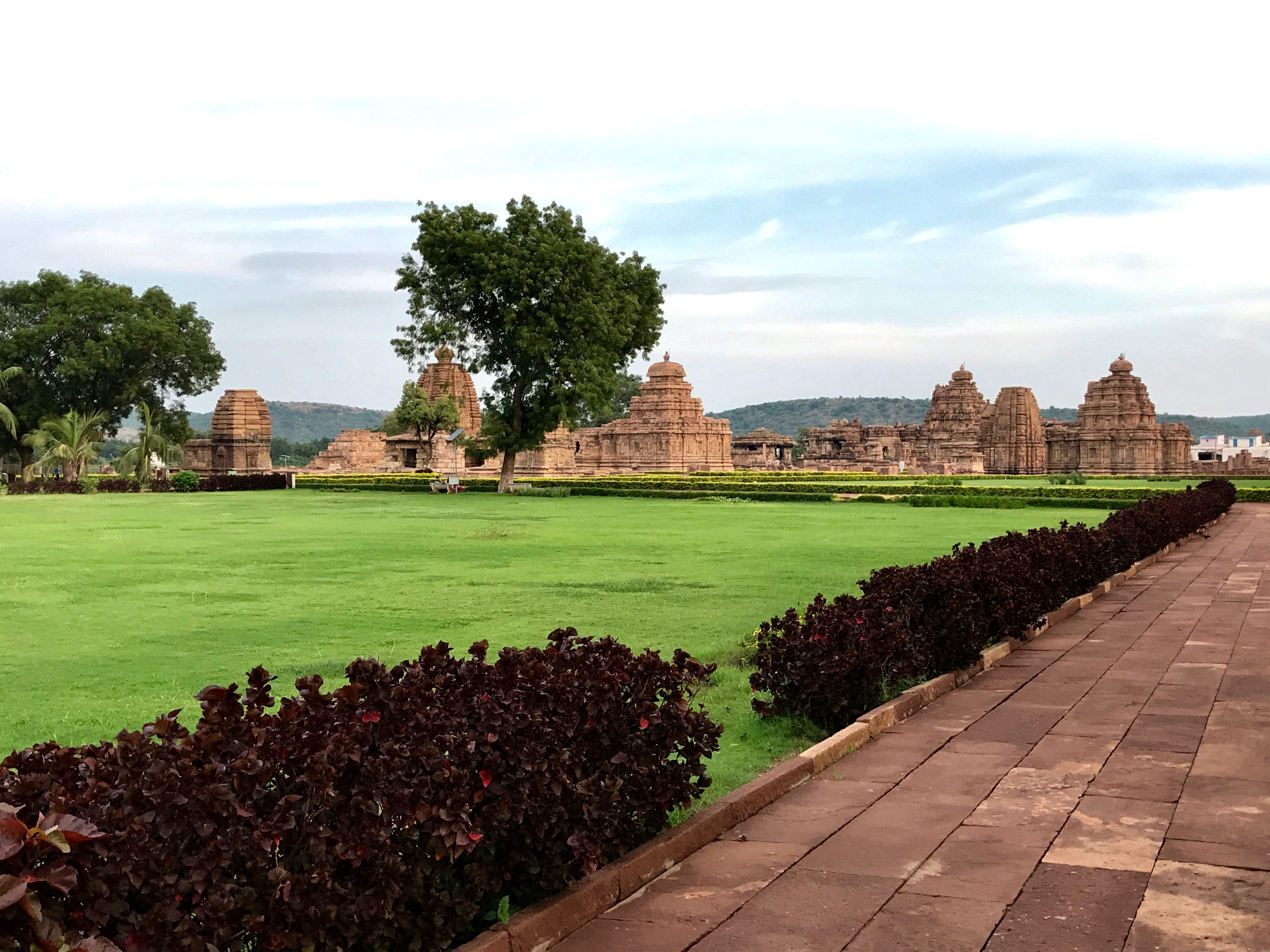
- Group of Monuments at Pattadakal

- Location within Karnataka
- Coordinates: 15.9484°N 75.8159°E
- Country: India
- State: Karnataka
- District: Bagalakote
- Elevation: 586 m (1,923 ft)

Languages
  - Official: Kannada
- Time zone: UTC+5:30 (IST)

Pattadakal, formerly known as Raktapura, is a small town in the Bagalkot district of north Karnataka, India. It is famous for its UNESCO world heritage site.

Pattadakal region was settled in prehistoric times, as evidenced by megalithic dolmens. Located along the Malprabha River where it turns north, its red-colored soil and stone mountains nearby attracted its mention in ancient and medieval-era Indian texts. The modern town contains the 7th- and 8th-century collection of nine Hindu and one Jain temple built by the Chalukya dynasty. UNESCO considers it a masterpiece of architectural forms from northern and southern India, which made the town and nearby region the cradle of temple architecture and arts.

The town is spread over 14.56 square kilometers, at an altitude of 593 meters. The summer (April–June) temperatures peak over 40 C; monsoons typically arrive by mid-June. The weather and temperatures cool by late August, with winter temperatures ranging between 15 and 28 C. Pattadakal is about 14 miles (23 km) from the larger town of Badami, and about 7 miles (11 km) from Aihole – another site with over a hundred ancient and early medieval era Hindu, Jain and Buddhist monuments. Pattadakal and neighboring villages constitute the Bagalkot taluk whose combined population was 173,181 according to the official 2011 census.

== See also ==
- Badami
- Badami cave temples

== Bibliography ==
- Michell, George l (2014). Temple Architecture and Art of the Early Chalukyas: Badami, Mahakuta, Aihole, Pattadakal. Niyogi Books. ISBN 978-93-83098-33-0.
- Michell, George (2017). Badami, Aihole, Pattadakal. Jaico (Reprinted, Orig Year: 2011). ISBN 978-81-8495-600-9.
