= Mayasura =

King of the Danavas in Hindu scriptures

- Danava
- Devanagari: मयासुर
- Sanskrit transliteration: Mayāsura
- Abode: Khandava Forest
- Texts: Mahabharata, Ramayana

Genealogy
- Parents: Kashyapa (father); Danu (mother)
- Spouse: Hema (in the Ramayana)
- Children: Mayav, Dundubhi, Vyomasura (sons); Mandodari (daughter)

Maya (Sanskrit: मय) or Mayāsura (मयासुर), also called Maya Danava, is a figure in Hindu history, described as the king of the Danavas, a race of beings descending from Kashyapa and his wife Danu. He is known for his architectural expertise, credited with creating the Mayasabha (Hall of Illusions) for the Pandavas and Tripura (Three cities) for the sons of Tarakasura. In the Ramayana, he is mentioned as the father-in-law of Ravana. He is presented as an architect of Maya (the illusory material reality). In the Surya Siddhanta 1.02, Mayāsura is described as a Daitya who received divine astronomical knowledge from the Sun God sometime around the end of Satya Yuga.

== In the Mahabharata ==
Mayasura is mentioned to be a son of the sage Kashyapa and his wife Danu.

Mayasura had befriended a Nāga named Takshaka and lived with him in the area of Khandavaprastha along with his family and friends. After the partition of Hastinapura, the Pandavas had come to live there and established Indraprastha. Later, the god Agni, with the help of Arjuna and Krishna, burnt the entire forest, killing most living beings in it and forcing Takshaka to flee. This made Mayasura decide to surrender to the Pandavas. Krishna was ready to forgive him and in return, Mayasura built a grand palace named Mayasabha, where the Pandavas would perform the Rajasuya Yagna.

Mayasura also offered him gifts like a bow, a sword etc. He gives a mace to Arjuna's brother Bhima named Vrkodara. In some versions of the Mahabharata he also gives Arjuna the Gandiva bow.

== In the Ramayana ==
The Uttara Kanda of the epic Ramayana mentions that during his visit to Svarga (heaven), Maya married an apsara (heavenly nymph) named Hema. They had two sons — Mayavi and Dundubhi — and a daughter Mandodari, who later married Ravana, the Rakshasa ruler of Lanka and the main antagonist of the epic. In some versions of the Ramayana, Maya had another daughter named Dhanyamalini, who also married Ravana.

== In Folklore ==
In some folktales from Bengal, Mayasura is married to Oladevi, the goddess of cholera.

== See also ==
- Vishvakarma
- Mara (demon)
- Mamuni Mayan
- Oladevi
