= Tripura (mythology) =

Group of three cities in Hindu mythology

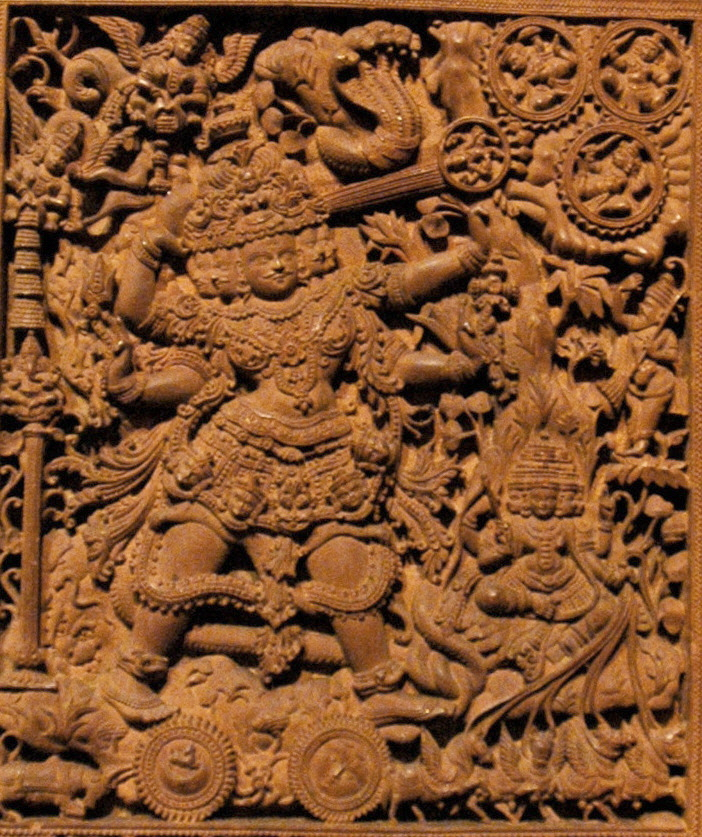
Here, the five headed Tripurantaka is seen pointing an arrow towards the Tripura (rightmost top corner) with the bow made of mount Meru, the serpent Vasuki is seen as its string. The four headed god Brahma is seen. The moon and the Sun are depicted as the wheels of the chariot.

In Hindu mythology, Tripura were three cities constructed by the great Asura architect Mayasura. They were great cities of prosperity, power and dominance over the world, but due to their impious nature, Maya's cities were destroyed by god Tripurantaka or Tripurari, an aspect of Shiva. The three cities were made of gold, silver and iron and were located on the heaven, earth and underworld planes respectively. The term Tripura means "three cities" or "three fortresses".

== Legend ==
=== Penances of the sons of Taraka ===
Following the death of Tarakasura, who was killed by Kartikeya, his sons Tarakaksha, Vidyunmali, and Kamalaksha undertook severe penances by which they pleased Brahma. They requested that they might be made immortal. Brahma declined their request, telling them that nothing can be immortal. Then Tarakaksha, Vidyunmali and Kamalaksha asked to be blessed with impregnable fortresses, which would be everlasting. When Brahma told them that nothing could be everlasting, they requested that the destruction of the cities could be brought about by a single arrow only, in the hope that it was impossible for anyone to shoot such an arrow, save Shiva, of whom they were great devotees. Brahma then gave them his blessing, thereby ensuring that such fortresses could indeed be constructed.

=== The construction of the three cities ===
The three cities which comprised Tripura were distributed thus:

- The lowest, with walls of Iron, located in the underworld,
- The second, with walls of silver, located on the earth, and
- The third, with walls of gold, located in heaven.

The three cities were mobile and moved in such a way that they would never be in a single line, except for a few moments in around a thousand years, when the Nakshatra Pushya would be in conjunction with the moon. Tarakasura's sons were thus reassured that they were safe, as it would be an extremely difficult task to destroy such impregnable cities, which aligned only momentarily, with but a single arrow.

Asuras from everywhere began to flock to Tripura to live there.

=== Forebodings of the fall of Tripura ===
After several years of joy, the inherent evil tendencies of the asuras surfaced once again and they began to oppress the good and torment the noble. In the meantime, Mayasura was engaged in the worship of Shiva. The rest of the demons attacked sages and the devas and shattered the peace of the worlds. Finally, when Indra and the rest of the devas despondently approached Brahma for respite, Brahma redirected them to Shiva and also informed them of the vulnerability of Tripura to a single arrow. Shiva promised to help them and the devas returned to combat the asuras in a mighty war. They were also assisted by Nandi, the leader of Shiva's Ganas. Even though Vidyunmali was slain by Nandi, and several other asuras were killed in the war, they were revived by water in the pool of Tripura, which had magical powers.

=== The destruction of Tripura ===
As the war raged on, devas continued to struggle to match the asuras, who used their magical powers to great effect in the war. On the day when the three cities aligned, Shiva ordered a chariot to be made from which he would battle the three asuras.

The war-chariot designed for Shiva was on a truly cosmic scale: Prithvi – the Earth herself – became the body of the chariot, while the Sun and Moon formed its wheels, with Brahma himself assuming the role of charioteer. As for the weapon for the single shot: Mount Meru formed the bow; the serpent Vasuki, the bowstring; Vishnu, the arrow; Agni, the arrowhead; and Vayu, the feather fletchings. In a similar fashion, all the remaining devas each took their own forms and places in the cosmic chariot. As the cities aligned (the lunar mansion of the Pushya Nakshatra assuming the necessary configuration) and Shiva prepared to nock the arrow upon the bowstring, the devas rejoiced at the roles they were soon to play in the destruction of Tripura, confident that Shiva could not accomplish the feat without their help.

Knowing what the devas were thinking, Shiva merely smiled instead of shooting the arrow, and all three purams instantly burst into flames. Awestruck by this effortless act of devastation, Brahma urged Shiva to forgive the devas for being foolishly proud in imagining themselves indispensable and also to relent and loose the superfluous arrow so that the devas would not suffer humiliation on account of their unneeded ingenuity in creating the chariot. Heeding Brahma's counsel, Shiva took pity on the devas and shot the arrow into the burning cities.

When Shiva seated himself upon the chariot before heading off to war, the chariot was unable to move forward due to his weight. Coming to his aid, Vishnu assumed the form of a bull in order to set the chariot in motion. Once this had been done, he became the bull banner flying atop the chariot. With the three cities destroyed, Shiva stood upon the ruins and began to perform the dance of Tandava Nritya (known also as Tripura Nasha Nartana) by which (as Nataraja, Lord of the Dance) he alternately calls the cosmos into being and banishes it into non-existence in an endless cycle like the beating of a heart.

=== Protection of Mayasura ===
Shiva immediately regretted his act, since he had forgotten to protect Mayasura, architect of the three cities and a great devotee of his. Realising this, Nandi raced ahead of the arrow and informed Mayasura of impending doom. The great architect lost no time in fleeing Tripura, leaving behind the fabulous cities he had constructed, before they (along with their inhabitants, the asuras) were reduced to ashes by the great arrow of Shiva. This destruction of Tripura, led to the bestowing upon Shiva of the epithet Tripurantaka (transl. 'He who brings'/'brought Tripura to an end').

== Sources ==
- Flood, Gavin (1996). An Introduction to Hinduism. Cambridge: Cambridge University Press. ISBN 0521438780.
- Issitt, Micah Lee; Main, Carlyn (2014). Hidden Religion: The Greatest Mysteries and Symbols of the World's Religious Beliefs. ABC-CLIO. ISBN 978-1610694780.
- Sharma, Arvind (2000). Classical Hindu Thought: An Introduction. Oxford University Press. ISBN 978-0195644418.
