= History of Hinduism =

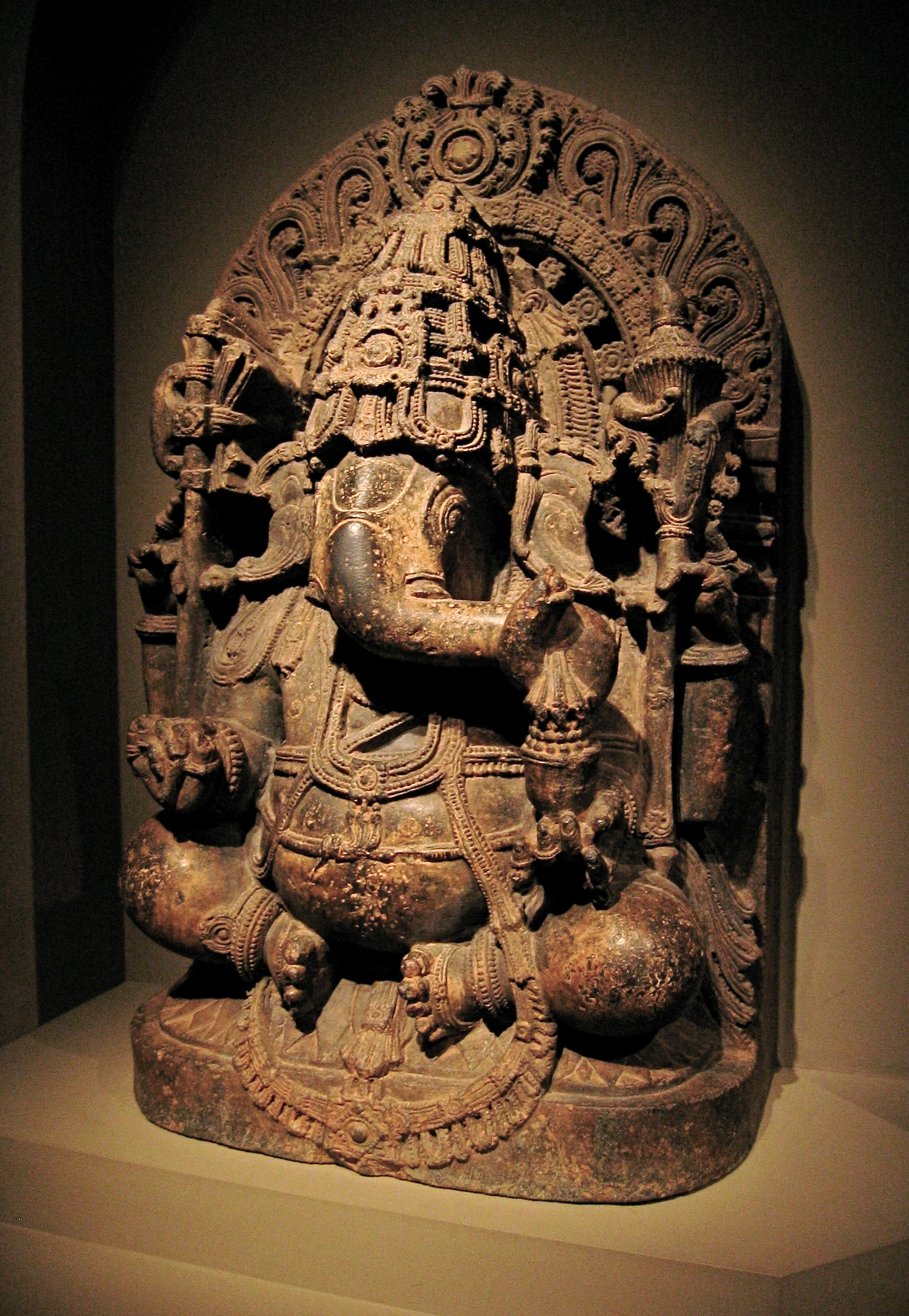
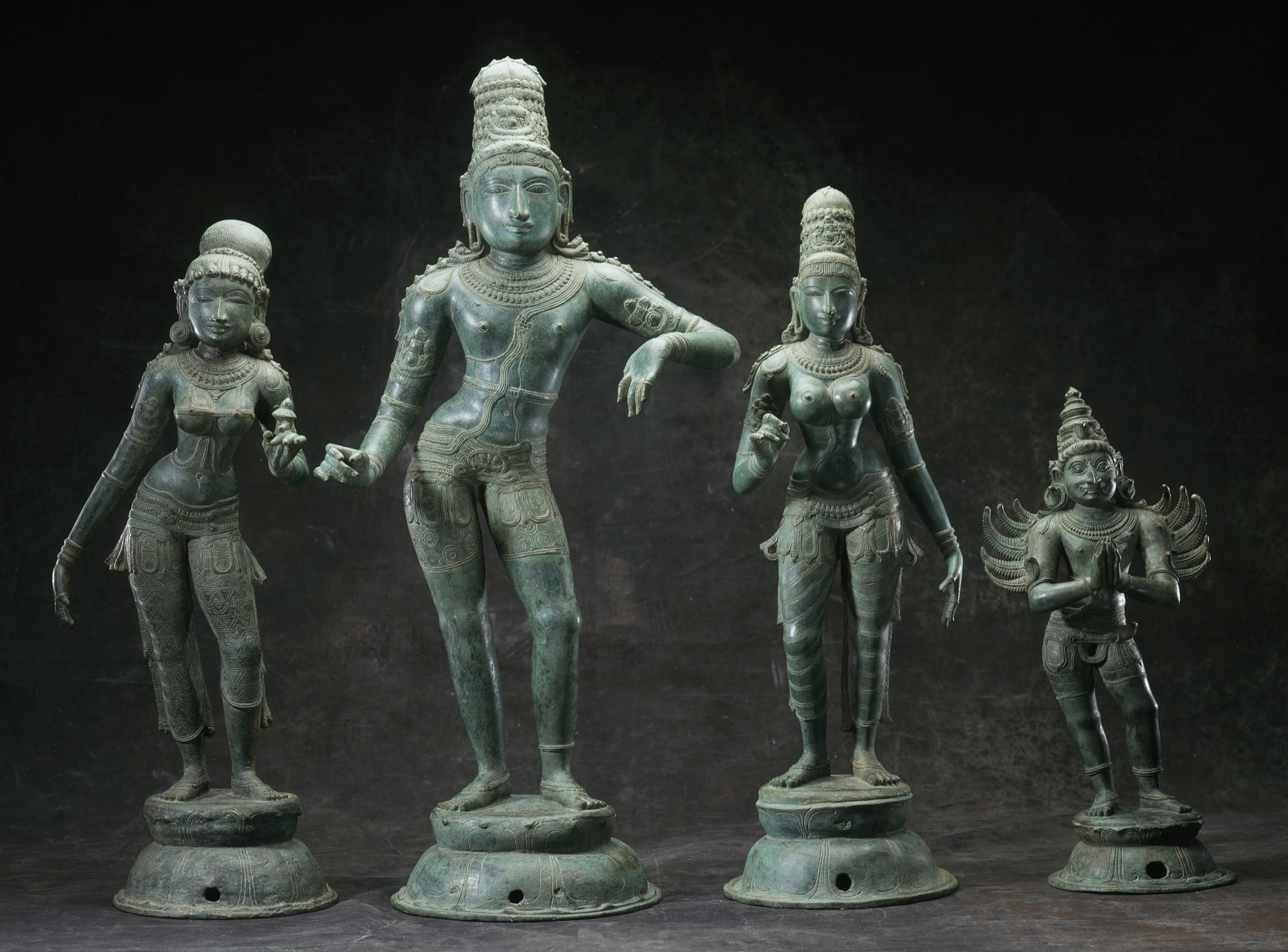
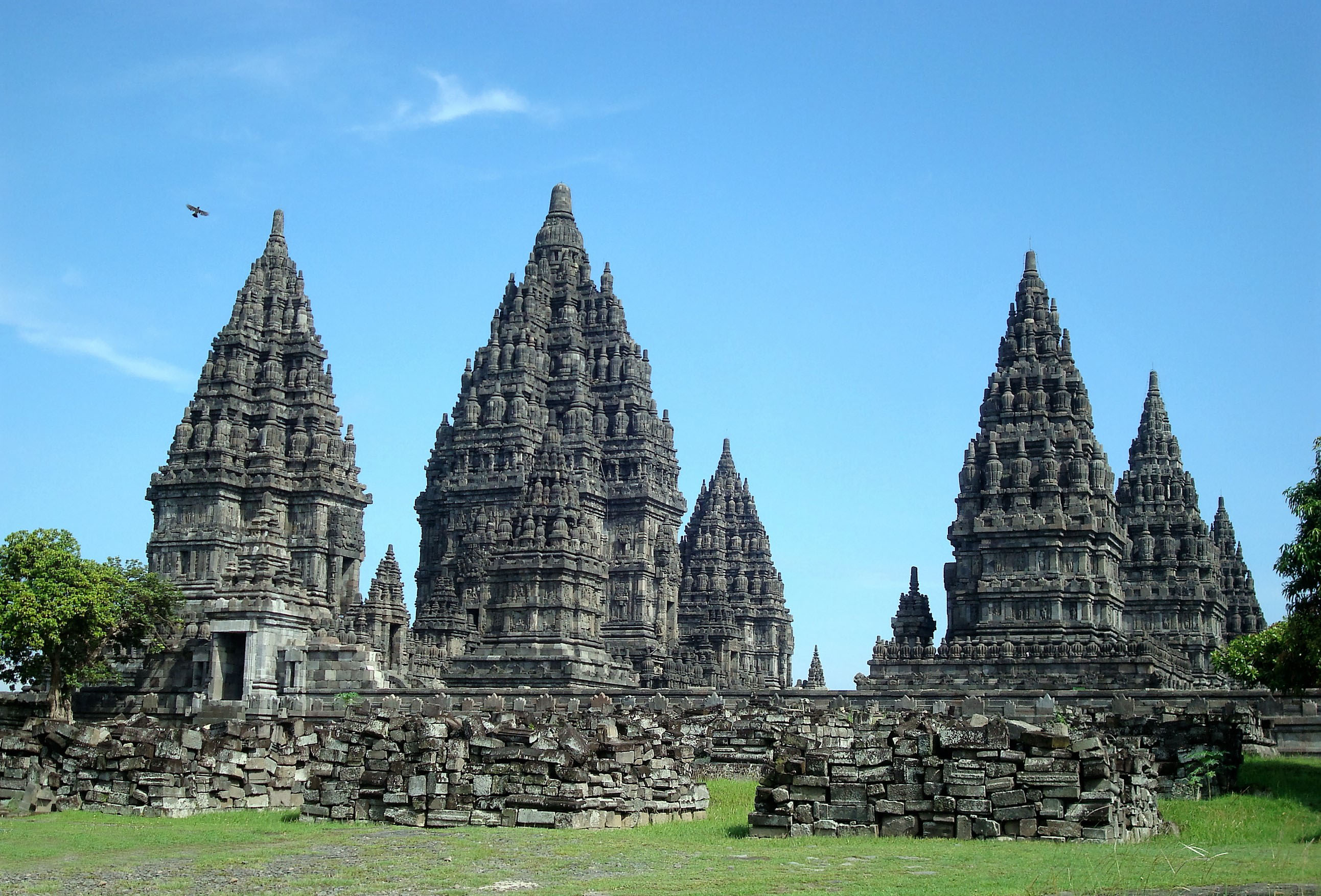
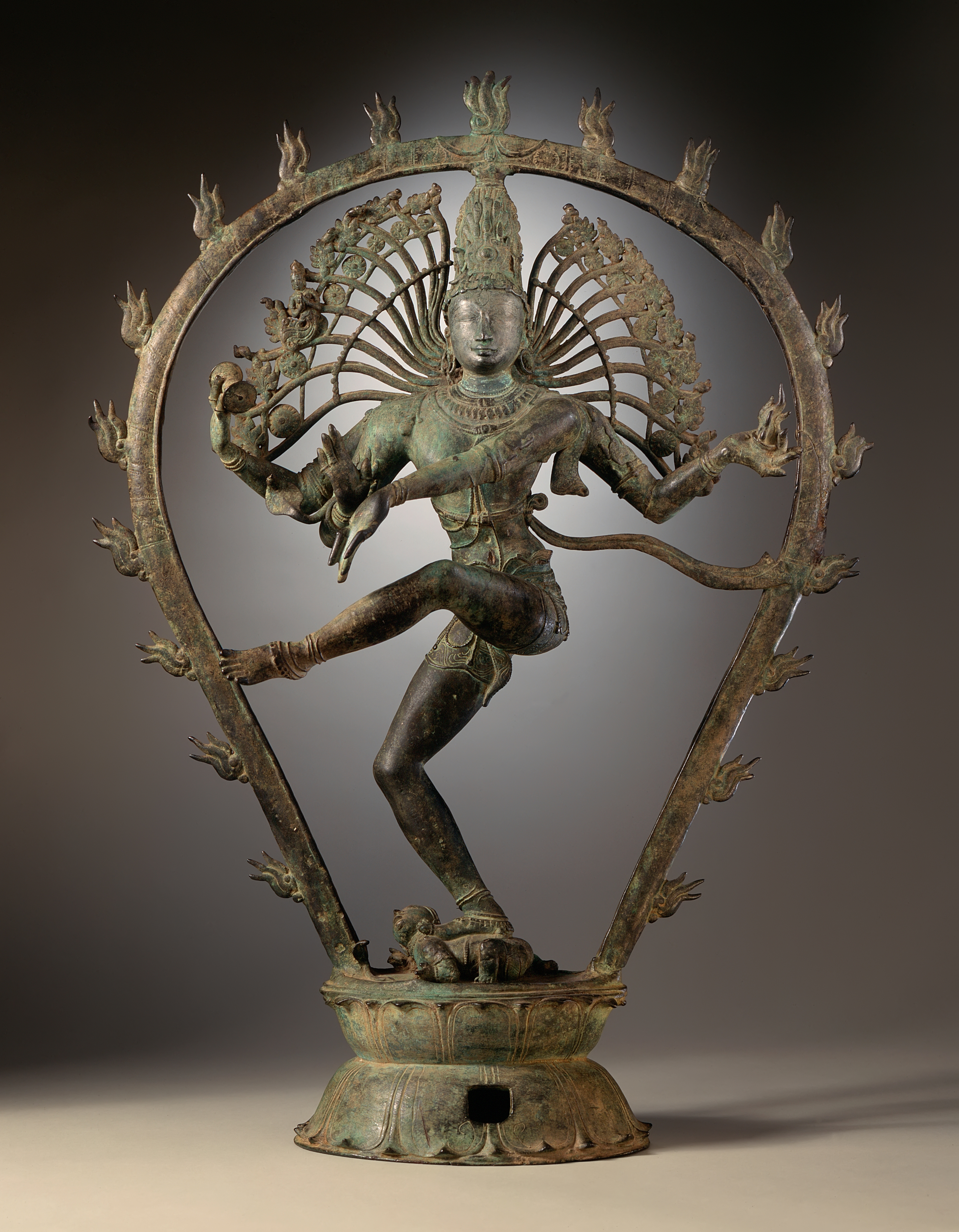
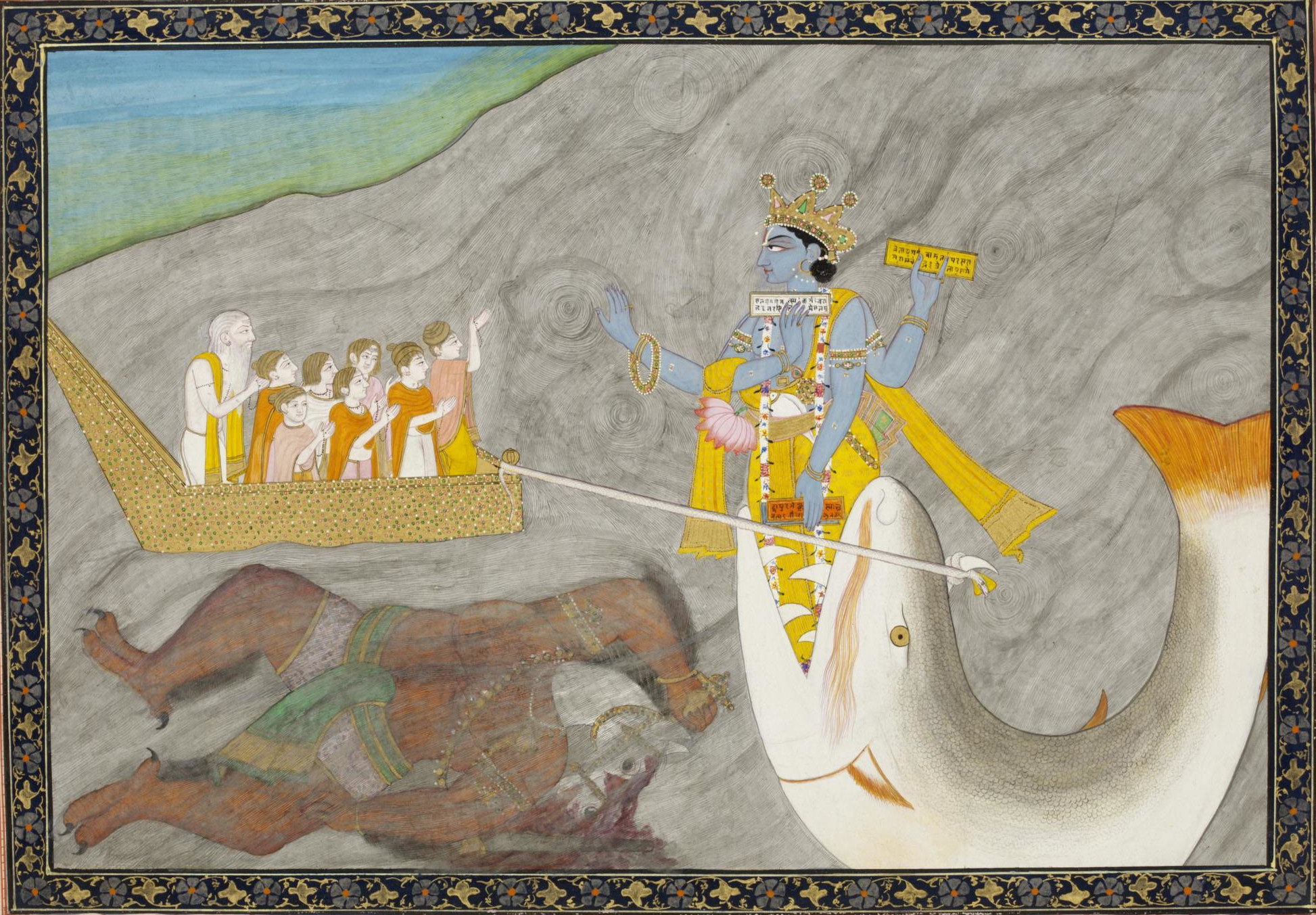
Hindu artifacts, artworks and temples ranging from the 9th-century to the 21st-century

The history of Hinduism covers a wide variety of related religious traditions native to the Indian subcontinent. It overlaps or coincides with the development of religion in the Indian subcontinent since the Iron Age, with some of its elements possibly tracing back to prehistoric religions such as those of the Bronze Age Indus Valley Civilisation. Hinduism has been called the "oldest religion" in the world, (Note: See: "Oldest religion": Fowler (1997, p. 1): "probably the oldest religion in the world"; Gellman & Hartman (2011): "Hinduism, the world's oldest religion"; Stevens (2001, p. 191): "Hinduism, the oldest religion in the world"; Sarma (1987, p.): the "oldest living religion"; The "oldest living major religion" in the world.(Klostermaier 2007, p. 1); Laderman (2003, p. 119): "world's oldest living civilisation and religion"; Turner & 1996-B, p. 359): "It is also recognized as the oldest major religion in the world."; Smart (1993, p. 1), on the other hand, calls it also one of the youngest religions: "Hinduism could be seen to be much more recent, though with various ancient roots: in a sense it was formed in the late 19th Century and early 20th Century." See also: Urreligion, Shamanism, Animism, Ancestor worship for some of the oldest forms of religion; Sarnaism and Sanamahism, Indian Tribal religions connected to the earliest migrations into India; Australian Aboriginal mythology, one of the oldest surviving religions in the world.) but scholars regard Hinduism as a relatively recent synthesis of various Indian cultures and traditions, with diverse roots and no single founder, (Note: Among its roots are the Vedic religion (Flood 1996, p. 16) of the late Vedic period and its emphasis on the status of Brahmans (Samuel 2010, pp. 48–53), but also the religions of the Indus Valley civilisation (Narayanan 2009, p. 11, Lockard 2007, p. 52, Hiltebeitel 2007, p. 3, Jones & Ryan 2006, p. xviii), the Sramana (Gomez 2013, p. 42) or renouncer traditions (Flood 1996, p. 16) of east India (Gomez 2013, p. 42), and "popular or local traditions" (Flood 1996, p. 16).) which emerged around the beginning of the Common Era. (Note: More specifically, between c. 500 (Hiltebeitel 2007, p. 12) - 200 (Larson 2009) BCE and c. 300 CE (Hiltebeitel 2007, p. 12) in or after the period of the Second Urbanisation, and during the early classical period of Hinduism (200 BCE – 300 CE) (Hiltebeitel 2007, p. 12, Larson 2009).)

The history of Hinduism is often divided into periods of development. The first period is the pre-Vedic period, which includes the Indus Valley Civilization and local pre-historic religions. Northern India had the Vedic period with the introduction of the historical Vedic religion by the Indo-Aryan migrations, starting somewhere between 1900 BCE and 1400 BCE. (Note: There is no exact dating possible for the beginning of the Vedic period. Witzel mentions a range between 1900 and 1400 BCE. Flood mentions 1500 BCE) The subsequent period of the second urbanisation (600–200 BCE) is a formative period for Hinduism, Jainism and Buddhism followed by "a turning point between the Vedic religion and Hindu religions," during the Epic and Early Puranic period (c. 200 BCE to 500 CE), when the Epics and the first Purānas were composed. This was followed by the classical "Golden Age" of Hinduism (c. 320–650 CE), which coincides with the Gupta Empire. In this period the six branches of Hindu philosophy evolved, namely, Samkhya, Yoga, Nyaya, Vaisheshika, Mīmāṃsā, and Vedānta. Monotheistic sects like Shaivism and Vaishnavism developed during this same period through the Bhakti movement. It flourished in the medieval period from roughly 650 to 1100 CE, which forms the late Classical period or early Middle Ages, with the decline of Buddhism in India and the establishment of classical Puranic Hinduism.

Hinduism under both Hindu and Islamic rulers from c. 1200 to 1750 CE saw the increasing prominence of the Bhakti movement, which remains influential today. Adi Shankara became glorified as the main proponent of Advaita Vedanta, in response to the success of Vaishnavite bhakti.

The colonial period saw the emergence of various Hindu reform movements partly inspired by western movements, such as Unitarianism and Theosophy. The Partition of India in 1947 was along religious lines, with the Republic of India emerging with a Hindu majority. During the 20th century, due to the Indian diaspora, Hindu minorities have formed in all continents, with the largest communities in absolute numbers in the United States and the United Kingdom.

== Roots of Hinduism ==
While the Puranic chronology presents a genealogy of thousands of years, scholars regard Hinduism as a fusion, (Note: Lockard (2007, p. 50): "The encounters that resulted from Aryan migration brought together several very different peoples and cultures, reconfiguring Indian society. Over many centuries a fusion of Aryan and Dravidian occurred, a complex process that historians have labeled the Indo-Aryan synthesis." Lockard: "Hinduism can be seen historically as a synthesis of Aryan beliefs with Harappan and other Dravidian traditions that developed over many centuries.") synthesis, (Note: Hiltebeitel (2007, p. 12): "A period of consolidation, sometimes identified as one of 'Hindu synthesis', 'Brahmanic synthesis', or 'orthodox synthesis', takes place between the time of the late Vedic Upanishads (c. 500 BCE) and the period of Gupta imperial ascendency (c. 320–467 CE).") or amalgamation (Note: Alexander Wynne: "Eventually, of course, the classical Indian civilisation that emerged under the Guptas combined the priestly ritualism of the Brahmins with the asceticism and rationalism of Greater Magadha. But this amalgamation of originally separate cultures [...] was, in fact, a Brahmanization of an originally non-Vedic order. It would seem that the Brahmins ultimately succeeded in preserving Vedic culture--and their elite status--by absorbing the renunciant culture of Magadha, thus creating the rich mix that was to become “Hinduism.”") of various Indian cultures and traditions. (Note: See also: J. H. Hutton (1931), in Ghurye (1980, pp. 3–4) (Note: Ghurye: He [Hutton] considers modern Hinduism to be the result of an amalgam between pre-Aryan Indian beliefs of Mediterranean inspiration and the religion of the Rigveda. "The Tribal religions present, as it were, surplus material not yet built into the temple of Hinduism".); Zimmer (1951, pp. 218–219); Tyler (1973), India: An Anthropological Perspective, Goodyear Publishing Company. In: Sjoberg (1990, p. 43). (Note: Tyler, in India: An Anthropological Perspective (1973), p. 68, as quoted by Sjoberg, calls Hinduism a "synthesis" in which the Dravidian elements prevail: "The Hindu synthesis was less the dialectical reduction of orthodoxy and heterodoxy than the resurgence of the ancient, aboriginal Indus civilization. In this process the rude, barbaric Aryan tribes were gradually civilised and eventually merged with the autochthonous Dravidians. Although elements of their domestic cult and ritualism were jealously preserved by Brahman priests, the body of their culture survived only in fragmentary tales and allegories embedded in vast, syncretistic compendia. On the whole, the Aryan contribution to Indian culture is insignificant. The essential pattern of Indian culture was already established in the third millennium B.C., and ... the form of Indian civilization perdured and eventually reasserted itself."); Sjoberg (1990); Flood (1996, p. 16); Vijay Nath (2001); Werner (2005, pp. 8–9); Lockard (2007, p. 50); Hiltebeitel (2007); Hopfe & Woodward (2008, p. 79) (Note: Hopfe & Woodward (2008, p. 79): "The religion that the Aryans brought with them mingled with the religion of the native people, and the culture that developed between them became classical Hinduism."); Samuel (2010)) Among its roots are the historical Vedic religion, itself already the product of "a composite of the Indo-Aryan and Harappan cultures and civilizations", (Note: See: White (2006, p. 28): "[T]he religion of the Vedas was already a composite of the Indo-Aryan and Harappan cultures and civilizations."; Gombrich (1996, pp. 35–36): "It is important to bear in mind that the Indo-Aryans did not enter an uninhabited land. For nearly two millennia they and their culture gradually penetrated India, moving east and south from their original seat in the Punjab. They mixed with people who spoke Munda or Dravidian languages, who have left no traces of their culture beyond some archaeological remains; we know as little about them as we would about the Indo-Aryans if they had left no texts. In fact we cannot even be sure whether some of the archaeological finds belong to Indo-Aryans, autochthonous populations, or a mixture. It is to be assumed – though this is not fashionable in Indian historiography – that the clash of cultures between Indo-Aryans and autochtones was responsible for many of the changes in Indo-Aryan society. We can also assume that many – perhaps most – of the indigenous population came to be assimilated into Indo-Aryan culture.) which evolved into the Brahmanical religion and ideology of the Kuru kingdom of Iron Age northern India; but also the Śramaṇa or renouncer traditions of northeast India, and mesolithic and neolithic cultures of India, such as the religions of the Indus Valley Civilisation, Dravidian traditions, and the local traditions and tribal religions.

This Hindu synthesis emerged after the Vedic period, between 500–200 BCE and c. 300 CE, in the period of the second urbanisation and the early classical period of Hinduism, when the Epics and the first Puranas were composed. This Brahmanical synthesis incorporated śramaṇic and Buddhist influences and the emerging bhakti tradition into the Brahmanical fold via the smriti literature. This synthesis emerged under the pressure of the success of Buddhism and Jainism, starting with the conquest of the Vedic heartland by the Nanda and Maurya rulers, which deprived the Brahmins of their patrons, threatening the survival of the Vedic ritual tradition. In response, Brahmins broadened their services, eventually resulting in the Hindu synthesis of Brahmanical orthodoxy with local religious traditions, which, centuries later, came to dominate India. During the Gupta reign the first Puranas were written, (Note: The date of the production of the written texts does not define the date of origin of the Puranas (Johnson 2009, p. 247). They may have existed in some oral form before being written down (Johnson 2009, p. 247).) which were used to disseminate "mainstream religious ideology amongst pre-literate and tribal groups undergoing acculturation." The resulting Puranic Hinduism differed markedly from the earlier Brahmanism of the Dharmasutras and the smritis. (Note: Michaels (2004, p. 38): "The legacy of the Vedic religion in Hinduism is generally overestimated. The influence of the mythology is indeed great, but the religious terminology changed considerably: all the key terms of Hinduism either do not exist in Vedic or have a completely different meaning. The religion of the Veda does not know the ethicised migration of the soul with retribution for acts (karma), the cyclical destruction of the world, or the idea of salvation during one's lifetime (jivanmukti; moksa; nirvana); the idea of the world as illusion (maya) must have gone against the grain of ancient India, and an omnipotent creator god emerges only in the late hymns of the rgveda. Nor did the Vedic religion know a caste system, the burning of widows, the ban on remarriage, images of gods and temples, Puja worship, Yoga, pilgrimages, vegetarianism, the holiness of cows, the doctrine of stages of life (asrama), or knew them only at their inception. Thus, it is justified to see a turning point between the Vedic religion and Hindu religions." See also Halbfass 1991, pp. 1–2) Hinduism co-existed for several centuries with Buddhism, to finally gain the upper hand at all levels in the 8th century. (Note: University of Oslo: "During the period following Ashoka, until the end of the 7th century AD, the great gift ceremonies honoring the Buddha remained the central cult of Indian imperial kingdoms".)

From northern India this "Hindu synthesis", and its societal divisions, spread to southern India and parts of Southeast Asia, as courts and rulers adopted the Brahmanical culture. (Note: Samuel (2010, p. 76): "Certainly, there is substantial textual evidence for the outward expansion of Vedic-Brahmanical culture." Samuel (2010, p. 77): "[T]he Buddhist sutras describe what was in later periods a standard mechanism for the expansion of Vedic-Brahmanical culture: the settlement of Brahmins on land granted by local rulers." See also Vijay Nath (2001). Samuel (2010, p. 199): "By the first and second centuries CE, the Dravidian-speaking regions of the south were also increasingly being incorporated into the general North and Central Indian cultural pattern, as were parts at least of Southeast Asia. The Pallava kingdom in South India was largely Brahmanical in orientation although it included a substantial Jain and Buddhist population, while Indic states were also beginning to develop in Southeast Asia.") (Note: Larson (1995, p. 81): "Also, the spread of the culture of North India to the South was accomplished in many instances by the spread of Buddhist and Jain institutions (monasteries, lay communities, and so forth). The Pallavas of Kanci appear to have been one of the main vehicles for the spread of specifically Indo-Brahmanical or Hindu institutions in the South, a process that was largely completed after the Gupta Age. As Basham has noted, "the contact of Aryan and Dravidian produced a vigorous cultural synthesis, which in turn had an immense influence on Indian civilisation as a whole.") (Note: Flood (1996, p. 129): "The process of Sanskritization only began to significantly influence the south after the first two centuries CE and Tamil deities and forms of worship became adapted to northern Sanskrit forms.") It was aided by the settlement of Brahmins on land granted by local rulers, the incorporation and assimilation of popular non-Vedic gods, (Note: Wendy Doniger. Other sources: the process of "Sanskritization", Encyclopædia Britannica.) (Note: Wendy Doniger: "If Sanskritization has been the main means of connecting the various local traditions throughout the subcontinent, the converse process, which has no convenient label, has been one of the means whereby Hinduism has changed and developed over the centuries. Many features of Hindu mythology and several popular gods—such as Ganesha, an elephant-headed god, and Hanuman, the monkey god—were incorporated into Hinduism and assimilated into the appropriate Vedic gods by this means. Similarly, the worship of many goddesses who are now regarded as the consorts of the great male Hindu gods, as well as the worship of individual unmarried goddesses, may have arisen from the worship of non-Vedic local goddesses. Thus, the history of Hinduism can be interpreted as the interplay between orthoprax custom and the practices of wider ranges of people and, complementarily, as the survival of features of local traditions that gained strength steadily until they were adapted by the Brahmans." Vijay Nath (2001, p. 31): "Visnu and Siva, on the other hand, as integral components of the Triad while continuing to be a subject of theological speculation, however, in their subsequent "avataras" began to absorb countless local cults and deities within their folds. The latter were either taken to represent the multiple facets of the same god or else were supposed to denote different forms and appellations by which the god came to be known and worshipped. Thus, whereas Visnu came to subsume the cults of Narayana, Jagannatha, Venkateswara and many others, Siva became identified with countless local cults by the sheer suffixing of Isa or Isvarato the name of the local deity, e.g., Bhutesvara, Hatakesvara, Chandesvara.") and the process of Sanskritization, in which "people from many strata of society throughout the subcontinent tended to adapt their religious and social life to Brahmanic norms". (Note: Wendy Doniger: "The process, sometimes called 'Sanskritization', began in Vedic times and was probably the principal method by which the Hinduism of the Sanskrit texts spread through the subcontinent and into Southeast Asia. Sanskritization still continues in the form of the conversion of tribal groups, and it is reflected in the persistence of the tendency among some Hindus to identify rural and local deities with the gods of the Sanskrit texts.") This process of assimilation explains the wide diversity of local cultures in India "half shrouded in a taddered cloak of conceptual unity".

According to Eliot Deutsch, Brahmins played an essential role in the development of this synthesis. They were bilingual and bicultural, speaking both their local language and popular Sanskrit, which transcended regional differences in culture and language. They were able to "translate the mainstream of the large culture in terms of the village and the culture of the village in terms of the mainstream", thereby integrating the local culture into a larger whole. While vaidikas and, to a lesser degree, smartas, remained faithful to the traditional Vedic lore, a new brahminism arose which composed litanies for the local and regional gods, and became the ministers of these local traditions.

== Periodisation ==
Authors on Hinduism and its history have used various periodisations, elaborating on influential periodisations like Mill's, and also describing some of the constituting traditions preceding the Hindu-synthesis. An elaborate periodisation may be as follows:

- Pre-history and Indus Valley Civilisation (until c. 1750 BCE);
- Vedic period (c. 1750–500 BCE);
- "Second Urbanisation" (c. 600–200 BCE);
- Classical Period (c. 200 BCE – 1200 CE); (Note: Different periods are designated as "classical Hinduism": Smart (2003, p. 52) calls the period between 1000 BCE and 100 CE "pre-classical". It is the formative period for the Upanishads and Brahmanism (Note: Smart (2003, pp. 52, 83–86) distinguishes "Brahmanism" from the Vedic religion, connecting "Brahmanism" with the Upanishads.) Jainism and Buddhism. For Smart, the "classical period" lasts from 100 to 1000 CE, and coincides with the flowering of "classical Hinduism" and the flowering and deterioration of Mahayana-buddhism in India.; For Michaels (2004, pp. 36, 38), the period between 500 BCE and 200 BCE is a time of "Ascetic reformism", whereas the period between 200 BCE and 1100 CE is the time of "classical Hinduism", since there is "a turning point between the Vedic religion and Hindu religions".; Muesse (2003, p. 14) discerns a longer period of change, namely between 800 BCE and 200 BCE, which he calls the "Classical Period". According to Muesse, some of the fundamental concepts of Hinduism, namely karma, reincarnation and "personal enlightenment and transformation", which did not exist in the Vedic religion, developed in this time.; Stein (2010, p. 107) The Indian History Congress, formally adopted 1206 CE as the date medieval India began.)
  - Pre-classical period (c. 200 BCE – 300 CE);
  - "Golden Age" of India (Gupta Empire) (c. 320–650 CE);
  - Late-Classical period - Puranic Hinduism (c. 650–1200 CE);
- Medieval Period (c. 1200–1500 CE);
- Early Modern Period (c. 1500–1850);
- Modern period (British Raj and independence) (from c. 1850).

History of Hinduism
James Mill (1773–1836), in his The History of British India (1817), (Note: Khanna 2007, p. xvii) distinguished three phases in the history of India, namely Hindu, Muslim and British civilisations. (Note: Misra 2004, p. 194) This periodisation has been influential, but has also been criticised, for the misconceptions it has given rise to. Another influential periodisation is the division into "ancient, classical, mediaeval and modern periods".
Smart	Michaels		Muesse	Flood
Indus Valley Civilisation and Vedic period (c. 3000–1000 BCE)	Prevedic religions (until c. 1750 BCE)		Indus Valley Civilisation (3300–1400 BCE)	Indus Valley Civilisation (c. 2500 to 1500 BCE)
Indus Valley Civilisation and Vedic period (c. 3000–1000 BCE)	Vedic	Early Vedic Period (c. 1750–1200 BCE)	Vedic period (1600–800 BCE)	Vedic period (c. 1500–500 BCE)
Indus Valley Civilisation and Vedic period (c. 3000–1000 BCE)	Vedic	Middle Vedic period (c. 1200–850 BCE)	Vedic period (1600–800 BCE)	Vedic period (c. 1500–500 BCE)
Pre-classical period (c. 1000 BCE – 100 CE)	Vedic	Late Vedic period (c. 850–500 BCE)	Classical period (800–200 BCE)	Vedic period (c. 1500–500 BCE)
Pre-classical period (c. 1000 BCE – 100 CE)	Ascetic reformism (c. 500–200 BCE)		Classical period (800–200 BCE)	Epic and Puranic period (c. 500 BCE to 500 CE)
Pre-classical period (c. 1000 BCE – 100 CE)	Classical	Preclassical Hinduism (c. 200 BCE – 300 CE)	Epic and Puranic period (200 BCE – 500 CE)	Epic and Puranic period (c. 500 BCE to 500 CE)
Classical period (c. 100 – 1000 CE)	Classical	"Golden Age" (Gupta Empire) (c. 320–650 CE)	Epic and Puranic period (200 BCE – 500 CE)	Epic and Puranic period (c. 500 BCE to 500 CE)
Classical period (c. 100 – 1000 CE)	Classical	Late-Classical Hinduism (c. 650–1100 CE)	Medieval and Late Puranic period (500–1500 CE)	Medieval and Late Puranic period (500–1500 CE)
Hindu-Islamic civilisation (c. 1000–1750 CE)	Islamic rule and "Sects of Hinduism" (c. 1100–1850 CE)		Medieval and Late Puranic period (500–1500 CE)	Medieval and Late Puranic period (500–1500 CE)
Hindu-Islamic civilisation (c. 1000–1750 CE)	Islamic rule and "Sects of Hinduism" (c. 1100–1850 CE)		Modern (1500–present)	Modern period (c. 1500 CE to present)
Modern period (c. 1750 CE – present)	Modern Hinduism (from c. 1850)		Modern (1500–present)	Modern period (c. 1500 CE to present)
Notes and references for table Notes Smart and Michaels seem to follow Mill's periodisation (Michaels mentions Flood 1996 as a source for "Prevedic Religions". (Note: Michaels 2004, pp. 31, 348)), while Flood and Muesse follow the "ancient, classical, mediaeval and modern periods" periodisation. Different periods are designated as "classical Hinduism": Smart calls the period between 1000 BCE and 100 CE "pre-classical". It is the formative period for the Upanishads and Brahmanism (Smart distinguishes "Brahmanism" from the Vedic religion, connecting "Brahmanism" with the Upanishads.), Jainism and Buddhism. For Smart, the "classical period" lasts from 100 to 1000 CE, and coincides with the flowering of "classical Hinduism" and the flowering and deterioration of Mahayana-buddhism in India.; For Michaels, the period between 500 BCE and 200 BCE is a time of "Ascetic reformism", whereas the period between 200 BCE and 1100 CE is the time of "classical Hinduism", since there is "a turning point between the Vedic religion and Hindu religions".; Muesse discerns a longer period of change, namely between 800 BCE and 200 BCE, which he calls the "Classical Period". According to Muesse, some of the fundamental concepts of Hinduism, namely karma, reincarnation and "personal enlightenment and transformation", which did not exist in the Vedic religion, developed in this time.; References Sources: Bentley, Jerry H. (1996). "Cross-Cultural Interaction and Periodization in World History". The American Historical Review. 101 (3): 749–770. doi:10.2307/2169422. JSTOR 2169422.; Flood, Gavin D. (1996). An Introduction to Hinduism. Cambridge University Press.; Khanna, Meenakshi (2007). Cultural History of Medieval India. Berghahn Books.; Kulke, Hermann; Rothermund, Dietmar (2004). A History of India. Routledge.; Michaels, Axel (2004). Hinduism. Past and present. Princeton, New Jersey: Princeton University Press.; Misra, Amalendu (2004). Identity and Religion: Foundations of Anti-Islamism in India. SAGE.; Muesse, Mark William (2003). Great World Religions: Hinduism.; Muesse, Mark W. (2011). The Hindu Traditions: A Concise Introduction. Fortress Press. ISBN 9780800697907.; Smart, Ninian (2003). Godsdiensten van de wereld (The World's religions). Kampen: Uitgeverij Kok.

== Pre-Vedic religions (until c. 1750 BCE) ==
=== Prehistory ===
According to Doniger, Hinduism may have roots in pre-historic (pre-textual, pre-Vedic) Mesolithic prehistoric religion, such as evidenced in the rock paintings of Bhimbetka rock shelters, (Note: Doniger 2010, p. 66: "Much of what we now call Hinduism may have had roots in cultures that thrived in South Asia long before the creation of textual evidence that we can decipher with any confidence. Remarkable cave paintings have been preserved from Mesolithic sites dating from c. 30,000 BCE in Bhimbetka, near present-day Bhopal, in the Vindhya Mountains in the province of Madhya Pradesh." (Note: 30,000 BCE is incorrect; this must be 8,000 BCE.)) which are about 10,000 years old (c. 8,000 BCE), as well as Neolithic times. At least some of these shelters were occupied over 100,000 years ago. (Note: Jones & Ryan 2006, p. xvii: "Some practices of Hinduism must have originated in Neolithic times (c. 4000 BCE). The worship of certain plants and animals as sacred, for instance, could very likely have very great antiquity. The worship of goddesses, too, a part of Hinduism today, may be a feature that originated in the Neolithic.") Several tribal religions still exist, though their practices may not resemble those of prehistoric religions.

=== Indus Valley Civilization (c. 3300–1700 BCE) ===
Some Indus valley seals show swastikas, which are found in other religions worldwide. Phallic symbols interpreted as the much later Hindu linga have been found in the Harappan remains. Many Indus valley seals show animals. One seal showing a horned figure seated in a posture reminiscent of the Lotus position and surrounded by animals was named by early excavators "Pashupati", an epithet of the later Hindu gods Shiva and Rudra. Writing in 1997, Doris Meth Srinivasan said, "Not too many recent studies continue to call the seal's figure a 'Proto-Siva', rejecting thereby Marshall's package of proto-Shiva features, including that of three heads. She interprets what John Marshall interpreted as facial as not human but more bovine, possibly a divine buffalo-man." According to Iravatham Mahadevan, symbols 47 and 48 of his Indus script glossary The Indus Script: Texts, Concordance and Tables (1977), representing seated human-like figures, could describe the South Indian deity Murugan.

In view of the large number of figurines found in the Indus valley, some scholars believe that the Harappan people worshipped a mother goddess symbolising fertility, a common practice among rural Hindus even today. However, this view has been disputed by S. Clark who sees it as an inadequate explanation of the function and construction of many of the figurines.

There are no religious buildings or evidence of elaborate burials. If there were temples, they have not been identified. However, House – 1 in HR-A area in Mohenjo Daro's Lower Town has been identified as a possible temple.

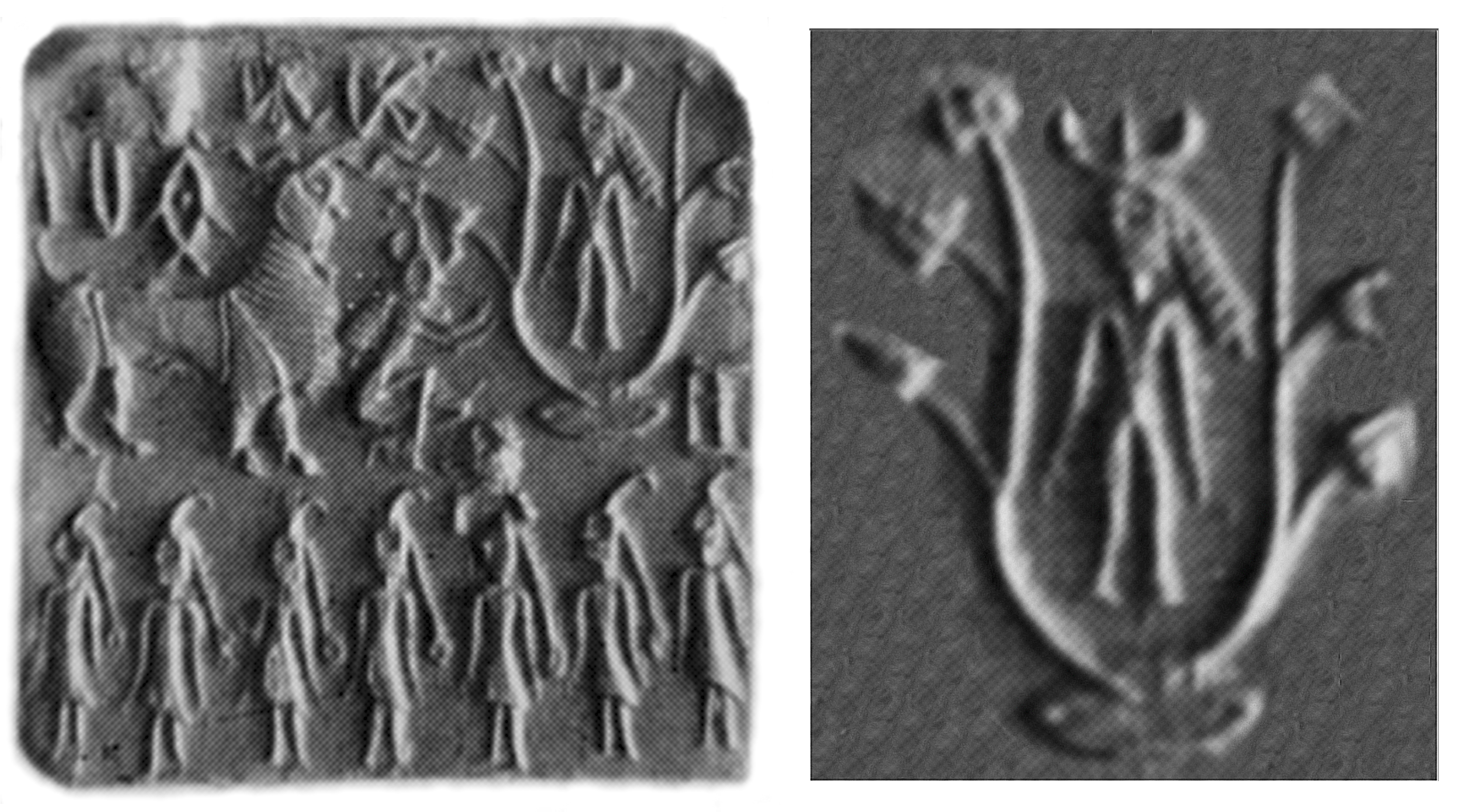
Horned deity with one-horned attendants on an Indus Valley seal. Horned deities are a standard Mesopotamian theme. 2000-1900 BCE. Islamabad Museum.

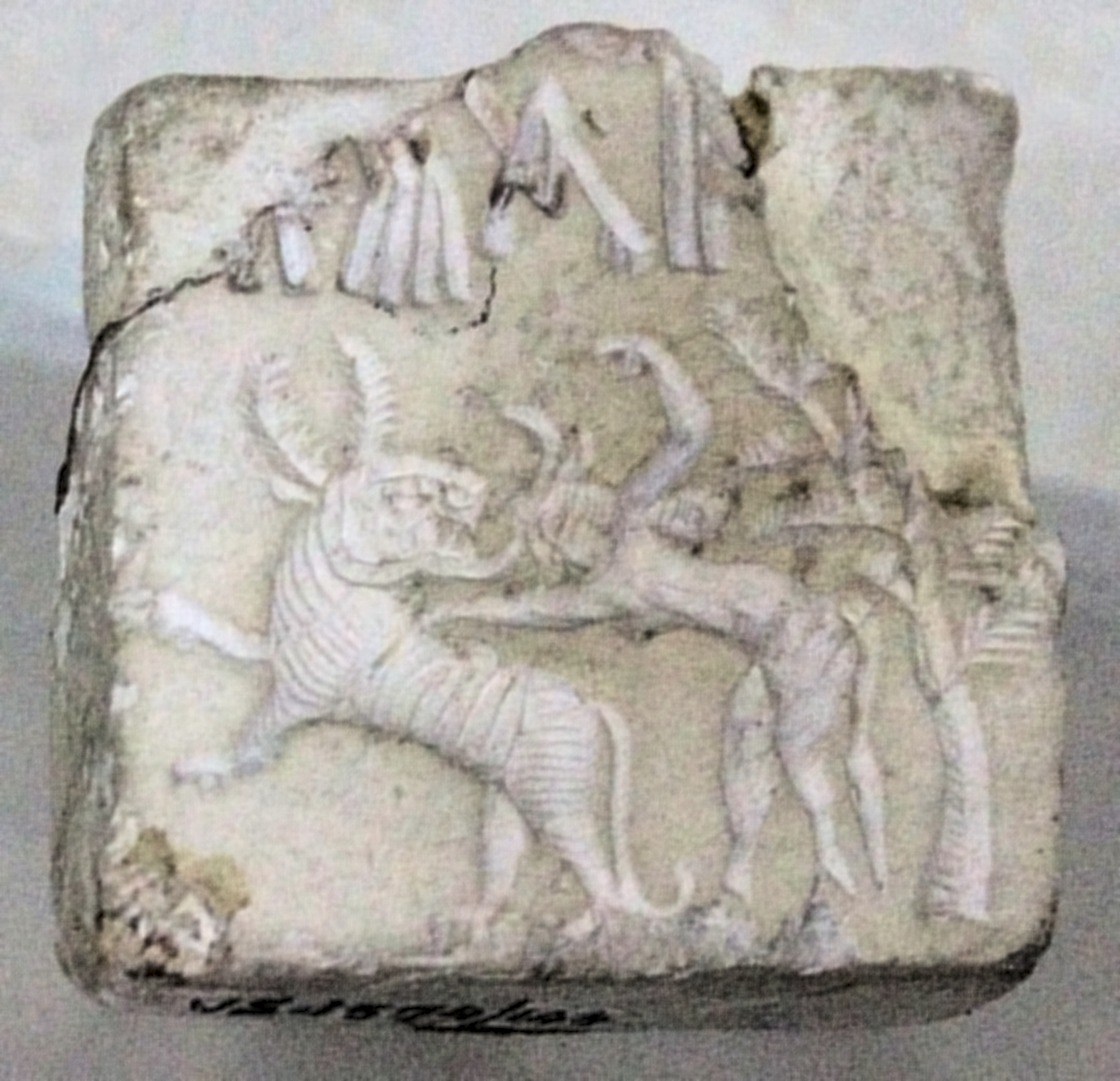
Fighting scene between a beast and a man with horns, hooves and a tail, who has been compared to the Mesopotamian bull-man Enkidu. Indus Valley Civilisation seal.

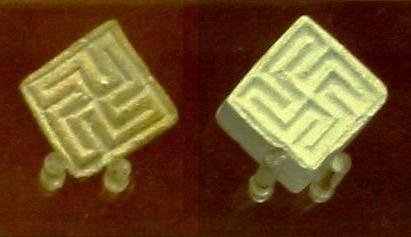
Swastika Seals from the Indus Valley Civilization preserved at the British Museum

== Vedic religion and Brahmanism (c. 1750–500 BCE) ==
Spread of Indo-European languages

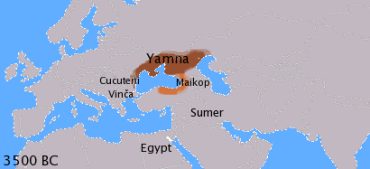
Indo-European languages c. 3500 BC

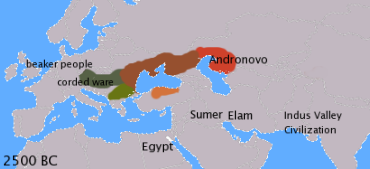
Indo-European languages c. 2500 BC

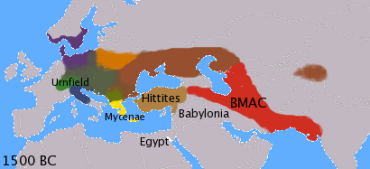
Indo-European languages c. 1500 BC

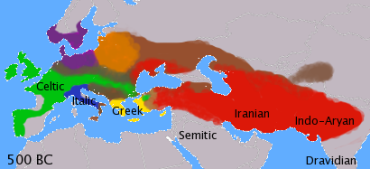
Indo-European languages c. 500 BC

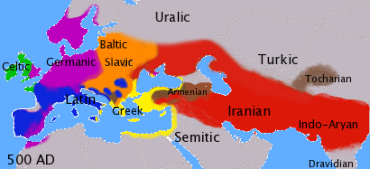
Indo-European languages c. 500 AD

Indo-Aryan migration

The Yamnaya culture, 3500–2000 BC

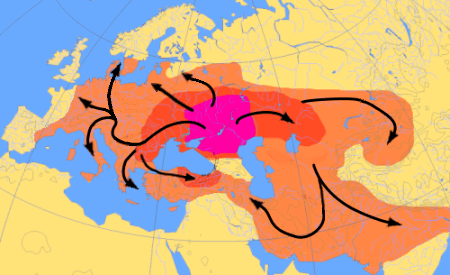
Scheme of Indo-European migrations from c. 4000 to 1000 BCE according to the Kurgan hypothesis. The magenta area corresponds to the assumed Urheimat (Samara culture, Sredny Stog culture). The red area corresponds to the area which may have been settled by Indo-European-speaking peoples up to ca. 2500 BCE; the orange area to 1000 BCE. (Christopher I. Beckwith (2009), Empires of the Silk Road, Oxford University Press, p.30)

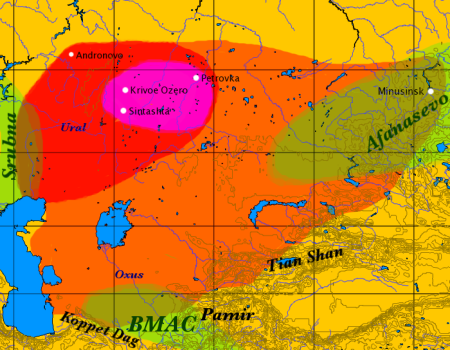
Map of the approximate maximal extent of the Andronovo culture. The formative Sintashta-Petrovka culture is shown in darker red. The location of the earliest spoke-wheeled chariot finds is indicated in purple. Adjacent and overlapping cultures (Afanasevo culture, Srubna culture, BMAC) are shown in green.

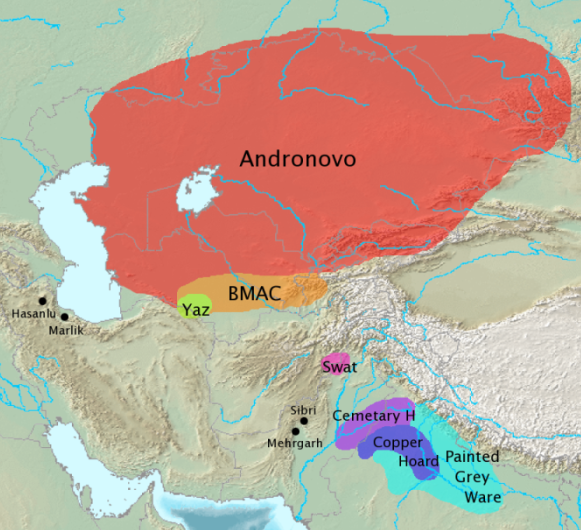
Archaeological cultures associated with Indo-Iranian migrations (after EIEC). The Andronovo, BMAC and Yaz cultures have often been associated with Indo-Iranian migrations. The GGC, Cemetery H, Copper Hoard and PGW cultures are candidates for cultures associated with Indo-Aryan movements.

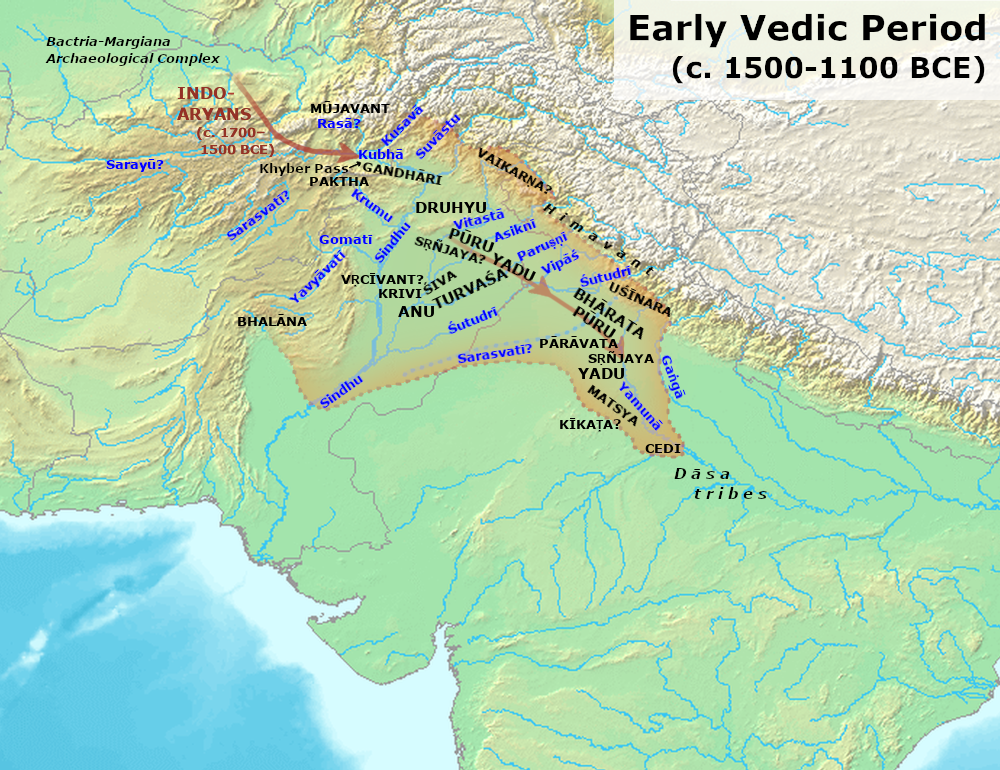
Early Vedic Period

The historical Vedic religion, also known as Vedicism and Vedism, (Note: Scholars such as Jan Gonda have used the term ancient Hinduism, distinguishing it from "recent Hinduism". Jamison & Witzel (1992, p. 3) use the term "Vedic Hinduism," but state:"... to call this period Vedic Hinduism is a contradictio in terminis since Vedic religion is very different from what we generally call Hindu religion – at least as much as Old Hebrew religion is from medieval and modern Christian religion. However, Vedic religion is treatable as a predecessor of Hinduism". Michaels (2004, p. 38) also emphasises the differences: "The legacy of the Vedic religion in Hinduism is generally overestimated. The influence of the mythology is indeed great, but the religious terminology changed considerably: all the key terms of Hinduism either do not exist in Vedic or have a completely different meaning. The religion of the Veda does not know the ethicised migration of the soul with retribution for acts (karma), the cyclical destruction of the world, or the idea of salvation during one's lifetime (jivanmukti; moksa; nirvana); the idea of the world as illusion (maya) must have gone against the grain of ancient India, and an omnipotent creator god emerges only in the late hymns of the rgveda. Nor did the Vedic religion know a caste system, the burning of widows, the ban on remarriage, images of gods and temples, Puja worship, Yoga, pilgrimages, vegetarianism, the holiness of cows, the doctrine of stages of life (asrama), or knew them only at their inception. Thus, it is justified to see a turning point between the Vedic religion and Hindu religions." See also Halbfass (1991, pp. 1–2) Encyclopedia Britannica, Vedic religion: "It [Vedic religion] takes its name from the collections of sacred texts known as the Vedas. Vedism is the oldest stratum of religious activity in India for which there exist written materials. It was one of the major traditions that shaped Hinduism." The Encyclopædia Britannica, Brahmanism, further explains that from the Vedic religion emerged Brahmanism, a religious tradition of ancient India. It states, "Brahmanism emphasized the rites performed by, and the status of, the Brahman, or priestly, class as well as speculation about Brahman (the Absolute reality) as theorized in the Upanishads (speculative philosophical texts that are considered to be part of the Vedas, or scriptures)." From Brahmanism developed Hinduism, when it was synthesised, around the start of the Common Era, with the non-Vedic Indo-Aryan religious heritage of the eastern Ganges plain and with local religious traditions; see Witzel 1995; Hiltebeitel 2002; Welbon 2004; Bronkhorst 2007; Samuel 2010.) was the sacrificial religion of the early Indo-Aryans, speakers of early Old Indic dialects, ultimately deriving from the Proto-Indo-Iranian peoples of the Bronze Age who lived on the Central Asian steppes. (Note: Mallory 1989, p. 38f. The separation of the early Indo-Aryans from the Proto-Indo-Iranian stage is dated to roughly 1800 BCE in scholarship.)

=== Origins ===
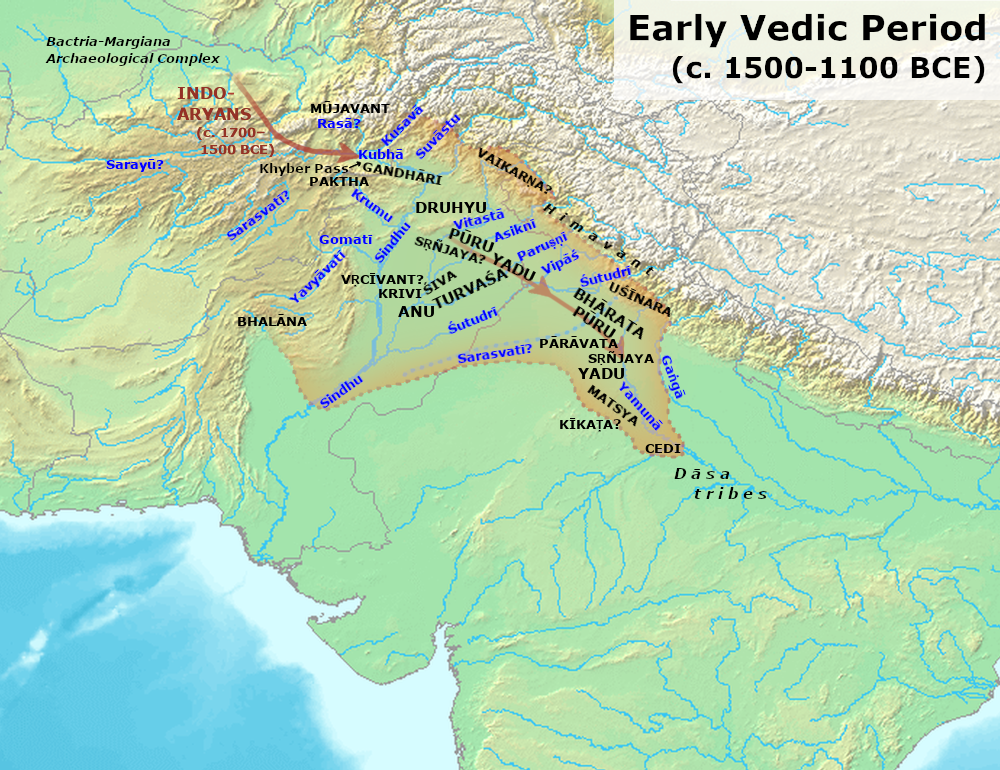
A map of tribes and rivers mentioned in the Rigveda

The Vedic period, named after the Vedic religion of the Indo-Aryans of the Kuru kingdom 1200 BCE – 525 BCE, (Note: Michaels (2004, p. 33): "They called themselves arya ('Aryans', literally 'the hospitable', from the Vedic arya, 'homey, the hospitable') but even in the Rgveda, arya denotes a cultural and linguistic boundary and not only a racial one.") lasted from c. 1750 to 500 BCE. (Note: There is no exact dating possible for the beginning of the Vedic period. Witzel (1995, pp. 3–4) mentions a range between 1900 and 1400 BCE. Flood (1996, p. 21) mentions 1500 BCE.) The Indo-Aryans were a branch of the Indo-European language family, which many scholars believe originated in Kurgan culture of the Central Asian steppes. (Note: Allchin & Erdosy (1995): "There has also been a fairly general agreement that the Proto-Indoaryan speakers at one time lived on the steppes of Central Asia and that at a certain time they moved southwards through Bactria and Afghanistan, and perhaps the Caucasus, into Iran and India-Pakistan (Burrow 1973; Harmatta 1992).") (Note: Kulke & Rothermund (1998): "During the last decades intensive archaeological research in Russia and the Central Asian Republics of the former Soviet Union as well as in Pakistan and northern India has considerably enlarged our knowledge about the potential ancestors of the Indo-Aryans and their relationship with cultures in west, central and south Asia. Previous excavations in southern Russia and Central Asia could not confirm that the Eurasian steppes had once been the original home of the speakers of Indo-European language.") Indeed, the ancient Vedic religion, including the names of certain deities, was in essence a branch of the same religious tradition as the ancient Greeks, Romans, Persians, and Germanic peoples. For example, the Vedic god Dyaus is a variant of the Proto-Indo-European god *Dyēus ph_{2}ter (or simply *Dyēus), from which also derive the Greek Zeus and the Roman Jupiter. Similarly the Vedic Manu and Yama derive from the Proto-Indo-European *Manu and *Yemo, from which also derive the Germanic Mannus and Ymir.

According to the Indo-European migration theory, the Indo-Iranians were the common ancestor of the Indo-Aryans and the Proto-Iranians. The Indo-Iranians split into the Indo-Aryans and Iranians around 1800–1600 BCE.

The Indo-Aryans were pastoralists who migrated into north-western India after the collapse of the Indus Valley Civilization. (Note: The Aryan migration theory has been challenged by some researchers (Michaels 2004, p. 33, Singh 2008, p. 186), due to a lack of archaeological evidence and signs of cultural continuity (Michaels 2004, p. 33), hypothesizing instead a slow process of acculturation or transformation (Michaels 2004, p. 33, Flood 1996, pp. 30–35). Nevertheless, linguistic and archaeological data clearly show a cultural change after 1750 BCE (Michaels 2004, p. 33), with the linguistic and religious data clearly showing links with Indo-European languages and religion (Flood 1996, p. 33). According to Singh 2008, p. 186, "The dominant view is that the Indo-Aryans came to the subcontinent as immigrants.") The Indo-Aryans were a branch of the Indo-Iranians, which originated in the Andronovo culture in the Bactria-Margiana era, in present northern Afghanistan. The roots of this culture go back further to the Sintashta culture, with funeral sacrifices which show close parallels to the sacrificial funeral rites of the Rigveda.

Although some early depictions of deities seem to appear in the art of the Indus Valley Civilisation, very few religious artefacts remain from the period corresponding to the Indo-Aryan migration during the Vedic period. It has been suggested that the early Vedic religion focused exclusively on the worship of purely "elementary forces of nature by means of elaborate sacrifices", which did not lend themselves easily to anthropomorphological representations. Various artefacts may belong to the Copper Hoard culture (2nd millennium CE), some of them suggesting anthropomorphological characteristics. Interpretations vary as to the exact signification of these artefacts, or even the culture and the periodisation to which they belonged.

During the Early Vedic period (c. 1500–1100 BCE) Indo-Aryan tribes were pastoralists in north-west India. After 1100 BCE, with the introduction of iron, the Indo-Aryan tribes moved into the western Ganges Plain, adopting an agrarian lifestyle. Rudimentary state-forms appeared, of which the Kuru-tribe and realm was the most influential. It was a tribal union, which developed into the first recorded state-level society in South Asia around 1000 BCE. It decisively changed their religious heritage of the early Vedic period, collecting their ritual hymns into the Veda-collections, and developing new rituals which gained their position in Indian civilisation as the orthodox Śrauta rituals, which contributed to the so-called "classical synthesis" or "Hindu synthesis".

=== Rigvedic religion ===
Who really knows?
Who will here proclaim it?
Whence was it produced? Whence is this creation?
The gods came afterwards, with the creation of this universe.
Who then knows whence it has arisen?

— Nasadiya Sukta, concerns the origin of the universe, Rigveda, 10:129-6

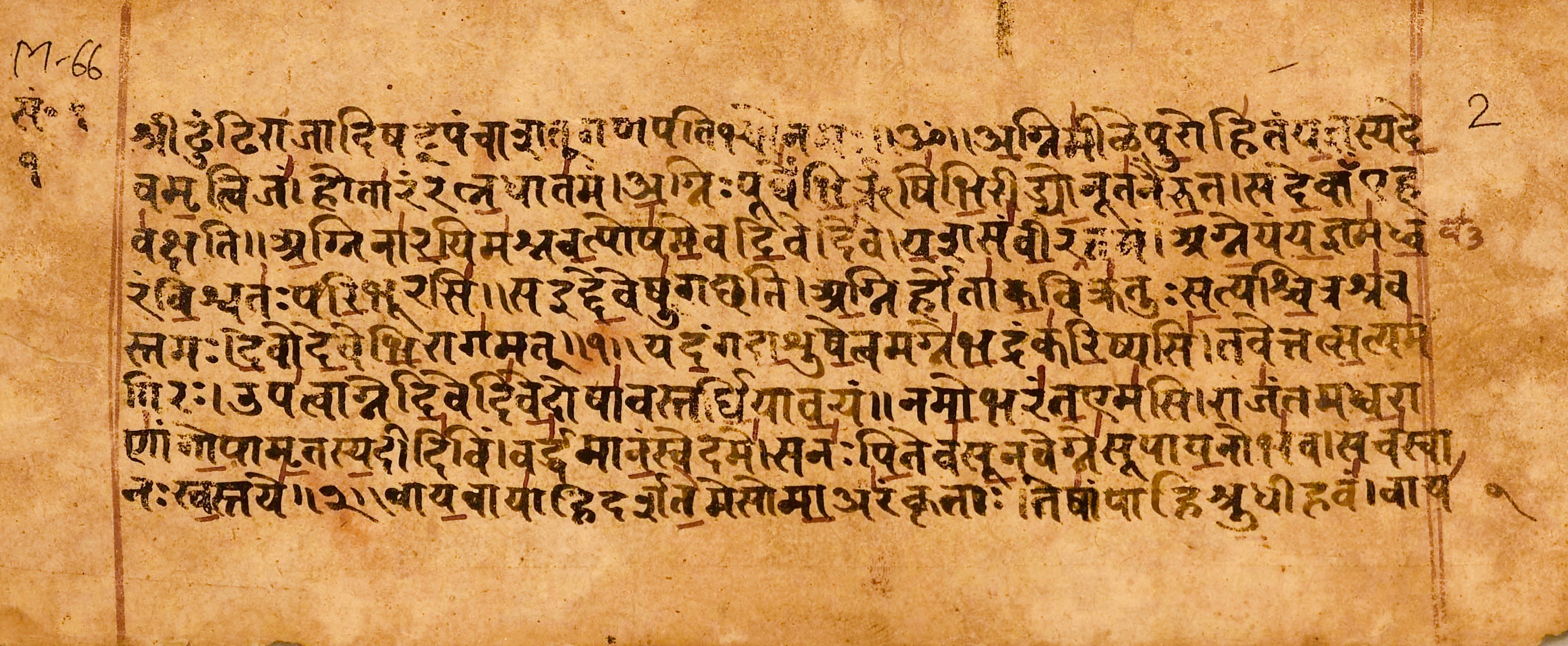
Rigveda manuscript page, Mandala 1, Hymn 1 (Sukta 1), lines 1.1.1 to 1.1.9 (Sanskrit, Devanagari script)

The Indo-Aryans brought with them their language and religion. The Indo-Aryan and Vedic beliefs and practices of the pre-classical era were closely related to the hypothesised Proto-Indo-European religion, and the Indo-Iranian religion. According to Anthony, the Old Indic religion probably emerged among Indo-European immigrants in the contact zone between the Zeravshan River (present-day Uzbekistan) and (present-day) Iran. It was "a syncretic mixture of old Central Asian and new Indo-European elements", which borrowed "distinctive religious beliefs and practices" from the Bactria–Margiana culture. At least 383 non-Indo-European words were borrowed from this culture, including the god Indra and the ritual drink Soma. According to Anthony,

Many of the qualities of Indo-Iranian god of might/victory, Verethragna, were transferred to the adopted god Indra, who became the central deity of the developing Old Indic culture. Indra was the subject of 250 hymns, a quarter of the Rig Veda. He was associated more than any other deity with Soma, a stimulant drug (perhaps derived from Ephedra) probably borrowed from the BMAC religion. His rise to prominence was a peculiar trait of the Old Indic speakers.

The oldest inscriptions in Old Indic, the language of the Rig Veda, are found not in northwestern India and Pakistan, but in northern Syria, the location of the Mitanni kingdom. The Mitanni kings took Old Indic throne names, and Old Indic technical terms were used for horse-riding and chariot-driving. The Old Indic term r'ta, meaning "cosmic order and truth", the central concept of the Rig Veda, was also employed in the Mitanni kingdom. And Old Indic gods, including Indra, were also known in the Mitanni kingdom.

Their religion was further developed when they migrated into the Ganges Plain after c. 1100 BCE and became settled farmers, further syncretising with the native cultures of northern India. The Brahmanical culture of the later Vedic period co-existed with local religions, such as the Yaksha cults, and was itself the product of "a composite of the Indo-Aryan and Harappan cultures and civilizations". David Gordon White cites three other mainstream scholars who "have emphatically demonstrated" that Vedic religion is partially derived from the Indus Valley Civilisation.

==== Vedas ====
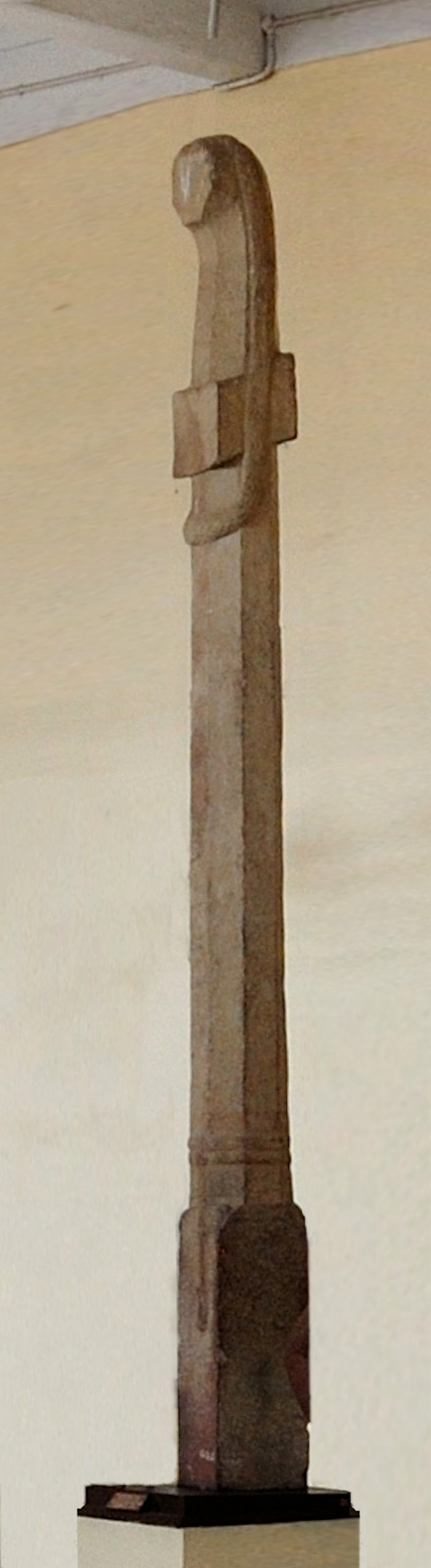
A Yūpa (यूप) sacrificial pillar, one of the most important elements of the Vedic ritual. Mathura Museum.

Its liturgy is preserved in the three Vedic Samhitas: the Rigveda, Samaveda and the Yajurveda. The Vedic texts were the texts of the elite, and do not necessarily represent popular ideas or practices. Of these, the Rig-Veda is the oldest, a collection of hymns composed between c. 1500 and 1200 BCE. The other two add ceremonial detail for the performance of the actual sacrifice. The Atharvaveda may also contain compositions dating to before 1000 BCE. It contains material pertinent to domestic ritual and folk magic of the period.

These texts, as well as the voluminous commentary on orthopraxy collected in the Brahmanas compiled during the early 1st millennium BCE, were transmitted by oral tradition alone until the advent, in the 4th century CE, of the Pallava and Gupta period and by a combination of written and oral tradition since then.

The Hindu samskaras

go back to a hoary antiquity. The Vedas, the Brahmanas, the Grhyasutras, the Dharmasutras, the Smritis and other treatises describe the rites, ceremonies and customs.

The earliest text of the Vedas is the Rigveda, a collection of poetic hymns used in the sacrificial rites of Vedic priesthood. Many Rigvedic hymns concern the fire ritual (Agnihotra) and especially the offering of Soma to the gods (Somayajna). Soma is both an intoxicant and a god itself, as is the sacrificial fire, Agni. The royal horse sacrifice (Ashvamedha) is a central rite in the Yajurveda.

The gods in the Rig-Veda are mostly personified concepts, who fall into two categories: the devas – who were gods of nature – such as the weather deity Indra (who is also the King of the gods), Agni ("fire"), Usha ("dawn"), Surya ("sun") and Apas ("waters") on the one hand, and on the other hand the asuras – gods of moral concepts – such as Mitra ("contract"), Aryaman (guardian of guest, friendship and marriage), Bhaga ("share") or Varuna, the supreme Asura (or Aditya). While Rigvedic deva is variously applied to most gods, including many of the Asuras, the Devas are characterised as Younger Gods while Asuras are the Older Gods (pūrve devāḥ). In later Vedic texts, "Asura" comes to mean demon.

The Rigveda has 10 mandalas ('books'). There is significant variation in the language and style between the family books (RV books 2–7), book 8, the "Soma Mandala" (RV 9), and the more recent books 1 and 10. The older books share many aspects of common Indo-Iranian religion, and is an important source for the reconstruction of earlier common Indo-European traditions. Especially RV 8 has striking similarity to the Avesta, containing allusions to Afghan flora and fauna, e.g. to camels (úṣṭra- = Avestan uštra). Many of the central religious terms in Vedic Sanskrit have cognates in the religious vocabulary of other Indo-European languages (deva: Latin deus; hotar: Germanic god; asura: Germanic ansuz; yajna: Greek hagios; brahman: Norse Bragi or perhaps Latin flamen etc.). In the Avesta, Asura (Ahura) is considered good and Devas (Daevas) are considered evil entities, quite the opposite of the Rig Veda.

==== Cosmic order ====
Ethics in the Vedas are based on the concepts of Satya and Ṛta. Satya is the principle of integration rooted in the Absolute. Ṛta is the expression of Satya, which regulates and coordinates the operation of the universe and everything within it. Conformity with Ṛta would enable progress whereas its violation would lead to punishment. Panikkar remarks:

Ṛta is the ultimate foundation of everything; it is "the supreme", although this is not to be understood in a static sense. ... It is the expression of the primordial dynamism that is inherent in everything....

The term "dharma" was already used in Brahmanical thought, where it was conceived as an aspect of Rta. The term rta is also known from the Proto-Indo-Iranian religion, the religion of the Indo-Iranian peoples prior to the earliest Vedic (Indo-Aryan) and Zoroastrian (Iranian) scriptures. Asha (aša) is the Avestan language term corresponding to Vedic language ṛta.

==== Upanishads ====
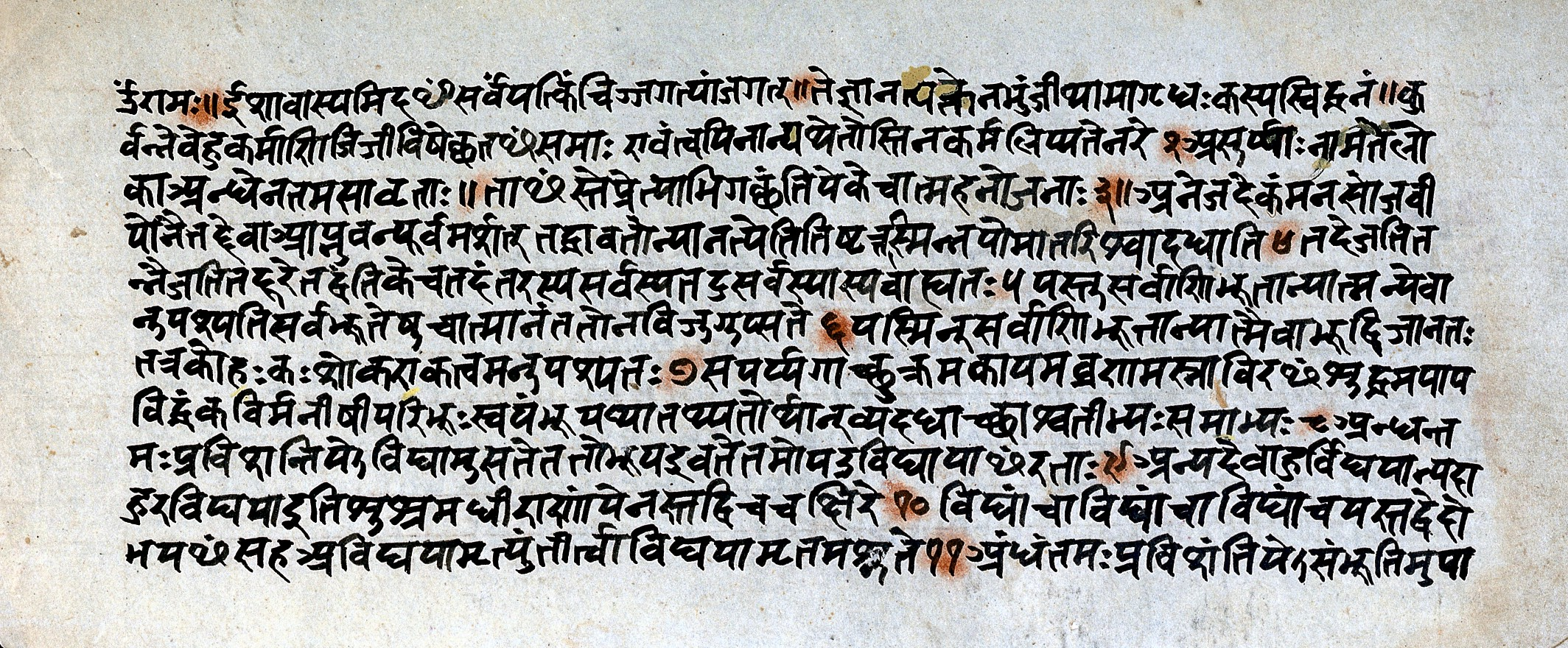
A page of Isha Upanishad manuscript

The 9th and 8th centuries BCE witnessed the composition of the earliest Upanishads. Upanishads form the theoretical basis of classical Hinduism and are known as Vedanta (conclusion of the Veda). The older Upanishads launched attacks of increasing intensity on the rituals, however, a philosophical and allegorical meaning is also given to these rituals. In some later Upanishads there is a spirit of accommodation towards rituals. The tendency which appears in the philosophical hymns of the Vedas to reduce the number of gods to one principle becomes prominent in the Upanishads.

Although it is sometimes assumed that the Upanishads propound a monistic framework, scholars like Brian Black and Andrew Nicholson have argued that this is an unfair assumption, referring to the presence of philosophically diverse themes in early Upanishads like the Brihadaranyaka Upanishad and Chandogya Upanishad. The ideas of the Upanishads were synthesised into a theistic framework in the Bhagavad Gita.

=== Brahmanism ===
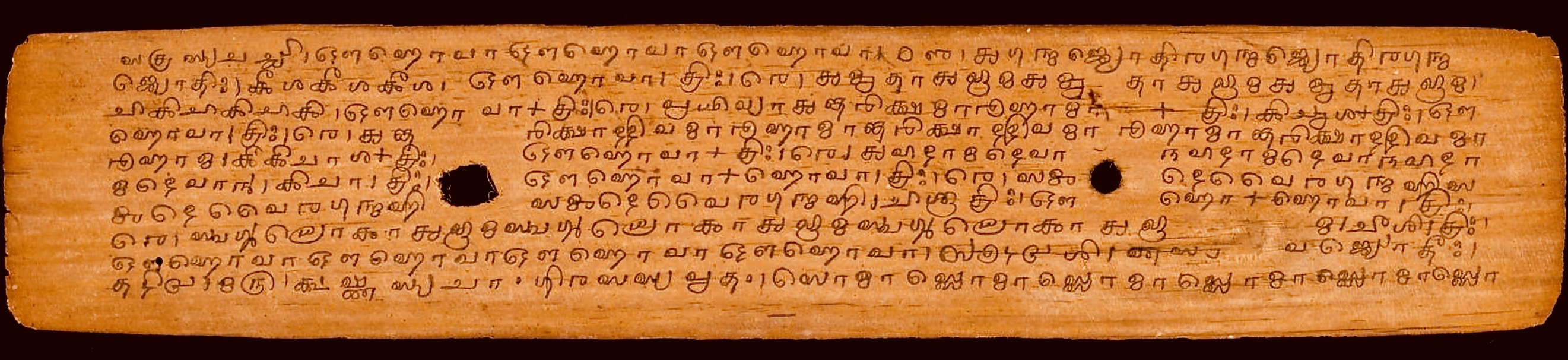
A page of the Jaiminiya Aranyaka Gana found embedded in the Samaveda palm leaf manuscript (Sanskrit, Grantha script)

Brahmanism, also called Brahminism or Brahmanical Hinduism, developed out of the Vedic religion, incorporating non-Vedic religious ideas, and expanding to a region stretching from the northwest Indian subcontinent to the Ganges valley. Brahmanism included the Vedic corpus, but also post-Vedic texts such as the Dharmasutras and Dharmasastras, which gave prominence to the priestly (Brahmin) class of the society. The emphasis on ritual and the dominant position of Brahmins developed as an ideology developed in the Kuru-Pancala realm, and expanded into a wider realm after the demise of the Kuru-Pancala realm. It co-existed with local religions, such as the Yaksha cults.

In Iron Age India, during a period roughly spanning the 10th to 6th centuries BCE, the Mahajanapadas arise from the earlier kingdoms of the various Indo-Aryan tribes, and the remnants of the Late Harappan culture. In this period the mantra portions of the Vedas are largely completed, and a flowering industry of Vedic priesthood organised in numerous schools (shakha) develops exegetical literature, viz. the Brahmanas. These schools also edited the Vedic mantra portions into fixed recensions, that were to be preserved purely by oral tradition over the following two millennia.

== Second Urbanisation and decline of Brahmanism (c. 600–200 BCE) ==
=== Upanishads and Śramaṇa movements ===
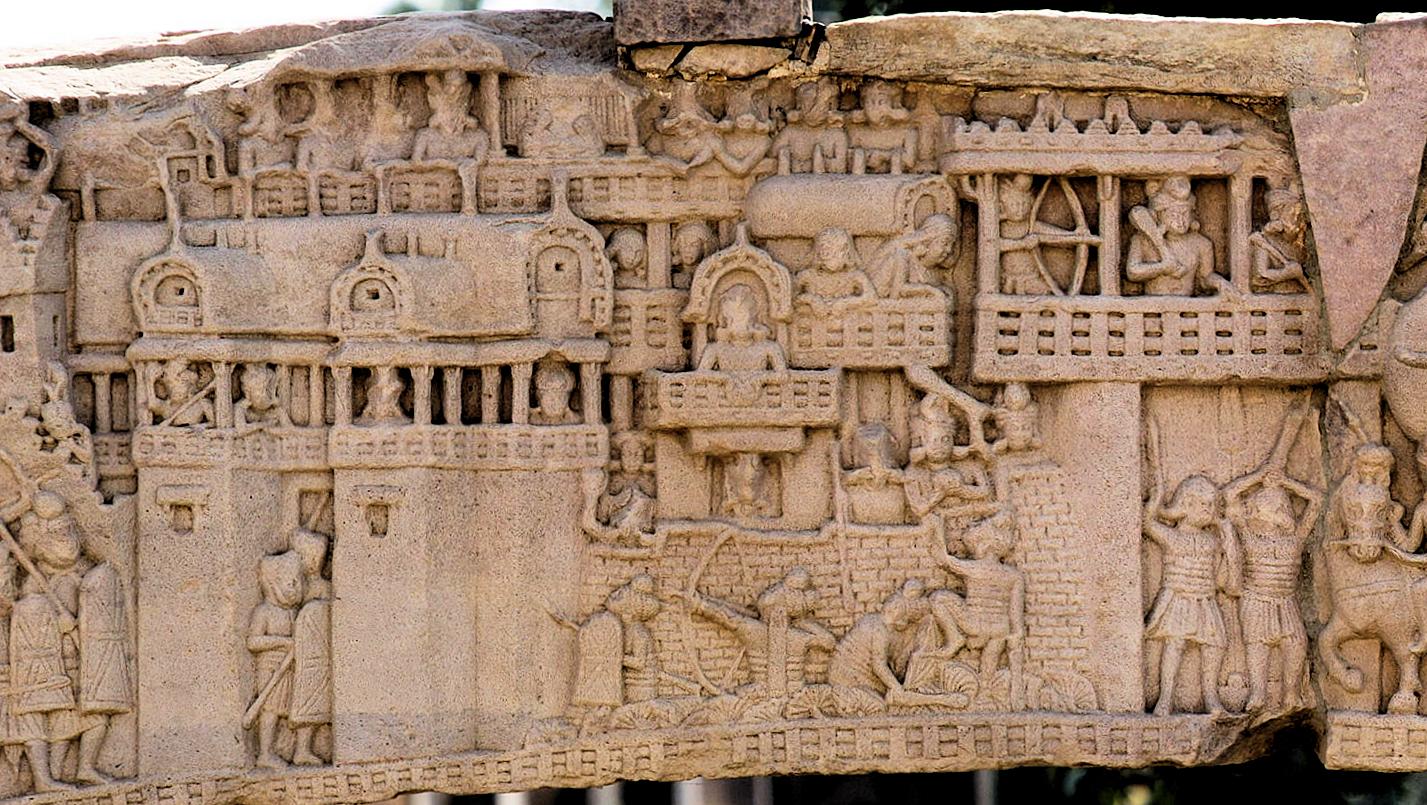
City of Kushinagar in the 5th century BCE, according to a 1st-century BCE relief in Sanchi

Buddhism and Jainism are two of many Indian philosophies considered as Śramaṇic traditions.

Brahmanism, with its orthodox rituals, may have been challenged as a consequence of the increasing urbanisation of India in the 7th and 6th centuries BCE, and the influx of foreign stimuli initiated with the Achaemenid conquest of the Indus Valley (circa 535 BCE). New ascetic or sramana movements arose, such as Buddhism, Jainism and local popular cults, which challenged the established religious orthodoxy. The anthropomorphic depiction of various deities apparently resumed in the middle of the 1st millennium BCE, also as the consequence of the reduced authority of Vedism.

Mahavira (c. 549–477 BCE), proponent of Jainism, and Buddha (c. 563–483 BCE), founder of Buddhism, were the most prominent icons of this movement. According to Heinrich Zimmer, Jainism and Buddhism are part of the pre-Vedic heritage, which also includes Samkhya and Yoga:

[Jainism] does not derive from Brahman-Aryan sources, but reflects the cosmology and anthropology of a much older pre-Aryan upper class of northeastern India – being rooted in the same subsoil of archaic metaphysical speculation as Yoga, Sankhya, and Buddhism, the other non-Vedic Indian systems. (Note: Zimmer's point of view is supported by other scholars, such as: Smart (1964, pp. 27–32); Belvakar & Ranade (1974, pp. 81, 303–409))

The Sramana tradition in part created the concept of the cycle of birth and death, the concept of Saṃsāra, and the concept of liberation, which became characteristic for Hinduism. (Note: Flood (2008, pp. 273–274): "The second half of the first millennium BCE was the period that created many of the ideological and institutional elements that characterise later Indian religions. The renouncer tradition played a central role during this formative period of Indian religious history ... Some of the fundamental values and beliefs that we generally associate with Indian religions in general and Hinduism, in particular, were in part the creation of the renouncer tradition. These include the two pillars of Indian theologies: samsara – the belief that life in this world is one of suffering and subject to repeated deaths and births (rebirth); moksa/nirvana – the goal of human existence.")

Pratt notes that Oldenberg (1854–1920), Neumann (1865–1915) and Radhakrishnan (1888–1975) believed that the Buddhist canon had been influenced by Upanishads, while la Vallee Poussin thinks the influence was nil, and "Eliot and several others insist that on some points the Buddha was directly antithetical to the Upanishads". (Note: King (1999) notes that Radhakrishnan was a representative of Neo-Vedanta, which had a specific understanding of Indian religions: "The inclusivist appropriation of other traditions, so characteristic of neo-Vedanta ideology, appears on three basic levels. First, it is apparent in the suggestion that the (Advaita) Vedanta philosophy of Sankara (c. eighth century CE) constitutes the central philosophy of Hinduism. Second, in an Indian context, neo-Vedanta philosophy subsumes Buddhist philosophies in terms of its own Vedantic ideology. The Buddha becomes a member of the Vedanta tradition, merely attempting to reform it from within. Finally, at a global level, neo-Vedanta colonises the religious traditions of the world by arguing for the centrality of a non-dualistic position as the philosophia perennis underlying all cultural differences.")

=== Mauryan Empire ===
The Mauryan period saw an early flowering of classical Sanskrit Sutra and Shastra literature and the scholarly exposition of the "circum-Vedic" fields of the Vedanga. However, during this time Buddhism was patronised by Ashoka, who ruled large parts of India, and Buddhism was also the mainstream religion until the Gupta period.

=== Decline of Brahmanism ===
==== Decline ====
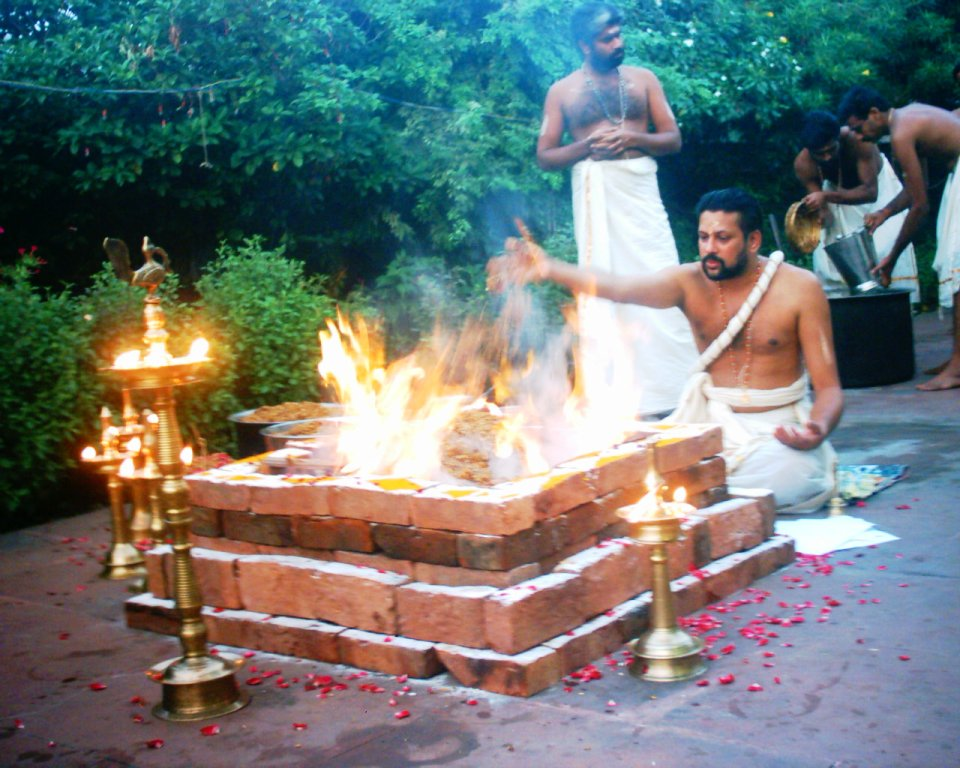
Nambūdiri Brahmin performing śrauta rites

The post-Vedic period of the Second Urbanisation saw a decline of Brahmanism. (Note: Michaels (2004, p. 38): "At the time of upheaval [500–200 BCE], many elements of the Vedic religion were lost".) At the end of the Vedic period, the meaning of the words of the Vedas had become obscure, and was perceived as "a fixed sequence of sounds" (Note: Klostermaier 2007, p. 55: "Kautas, a teacher mentioned in the Nirukta by Yāska (ca. 500 BCE), a work devoted to an etymology of Vedic words that were no longer understood by ordinary people, held that the word of the Veda was no longer perceived as meaningful "normal" speech but as a fixed sequence of sounds, whose meaning was obscure beyond recovery.") with a magical power, "means to an end." (Note: Klostermaier: "Brahman, derived from the root bŗh = to grow, to become great, was originally identical with the Vedic word, that makes people prosper: words were the principal means to approach the gods who dwelled in a different sphere. It was not a big step from this notion of "reified speech-act" to that "of the speech-act being looked at implicitly and explicitly as a means to an end". Klostermaier 2007, p. 55 quotes Madhav M. Deshpande (1990), Changing Conceptions of the Veda: From Speech-Acts to Magical Sounds, p. 4.) With the growth of cities, which threatened the income and patronage of the rural Brahmins; the rise of Buddhism; and the Indian campaign of Alexander the Great (327–325 BCE), the expansion of the Maurya Empire (322–185 BCE) with its embrace of Buddhism, and the Saka invasions and rule of northwestern India (2nd c. BCE – 4th c. CE), Brahmanism faced a grave threat to its existence. In some later texts, Northwest-India (which earlier texts consider as part of "Aryavarta") is even seen as "impure", probably due to invasions.

==== Survival of Vedic ritual ====
Vedism as the religious tradition of a priestly elite was marginalised by other traditions such as Jainism and Buddhism in the later Iron Age, but in the Middle Ages would rise to renewed prestige with the Mimamsa school, which as well as all other astika traditions of Hinduism, considered them authorless (apaurusheyatva) and eternal. A last surviving element of the Historical Vedic religion or Vedism is Śrauta tradition, following many major elements of the ancient Vedic religion and is prominent in South India, with communities in Tamil Nadu, Kerala, Karnataka, Andhra Pradesh, but also in some pockets of Uttar Pradesh, Maharashtra and other states; the best known of these groups are the Nambudiri of Kerala, whose traditions were notably documented by Frits Staal.

== Hindu synthesis and Classical Hinduism (c. 200 BCE – 1200 CE) ==
=== Early Hinduism (c. 200 BCE – 320 CE) ===
==== Hindu synthesis ====
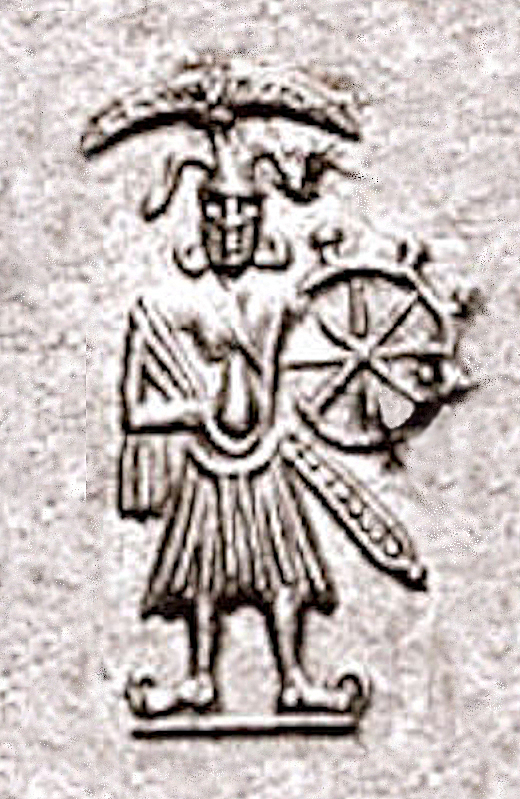
Vāsudeva-Krishna on a coin of Agathocles of Bactria, circa 190–180 BCE. This is "the earliest unambiguous image" of the deity.

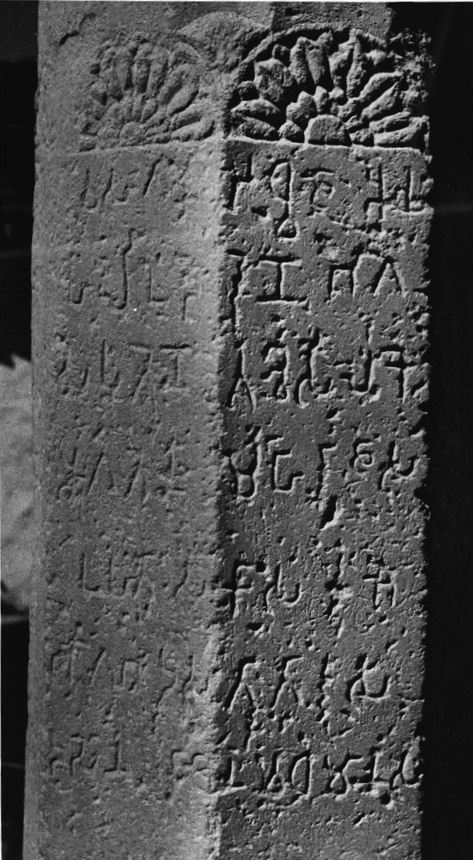
The Heliodorus pillar, commissioned by Indo-Greek ambassador Heliodorus around 113 BCE, is the first known inscription related to Vaishnavism in the Indian subcontinent. Heliodurus was one of the earliest recorded foreign converts to Hinduism.

The decline of Brahmanism was overcome by providing new services and incorporating the non-Vedic Indo-Aryan religious heritage of the eastern Ganges plain and local religious traditions, giving rise to contemporary Hinduism. Between about 500 BCE and c. 400 CE or starting from 200 BCE the "Hindu synthesis" developed, which incorporated Sramanic and Buddhist influences and the emerging Bhakti tradition into the Brahmanical fold via the smriti literature. This synthesis emerged under the pressure of the success of Buddhism and Jainism.

According to Embree, several other religious traditions had existed side by side with the Vedic religion. These indigenous religions "eventually found a place under the broad mantle of the Vedic religion". When Brahmanism was declining and had to compete with Buddhism and Jainism, (Note: Hiltebeitel (2007, p. 13): "The emerging self-definitions of Hinduism were forged in the context of continuous interaction with heterodox religions (Buddhists, Jains, Ajivikas) throughout this whole period, and with foreign people (Yavanas, or Greeks; Sakas, or Scythians; Pahlavas, or Parthians; and Kusanas, or Kushans) from the third phase on [between the Mauryan empire and the rise of the Guptas].) the popular religions had the opportunity to assert themselves. According to Embree,

[T]he Brahmanists themselves seem to have encouraged this development to some extent as a means of meeting the challenge of the heterodox movements. At the same time, among the indigenous religions, a common allegiance to the authority of the Vedas provided a thin, but nonetheless significant, thread of unity amid their variety of gods and religious practices.

This "new Brahmanism" appealed to rulers, who were attracted to the supernatural powers and the practical advice Brahmins could provide, and resulted in a resurgence of Brahmanical influence, dominating Indian society since the classical Age of Hinduism in the early centuries CE. It is reflected in the process of Sanskritization, a process in which "people from many strata of society throughout the subcontinent tended to adapt their religious and social life to Brahmanic norms". It is reflected in the tendency to identify local deities with the gods of the Sanskrit texts.

==== Smriti ====
The Brahmins response of assimilation and consolidation is reflected in the smriti literature which took shape in this period. The smriti texts of the period between 200 BCE and 100 CE proclaim the authority of the Vedas, and acceptance of the Vedas became a central criterion for defining Hinduism over and against the heterodoxies, which rejected the Vedas. Most of the basic ideas and practices of classical Hinduism derive from the new smriti literature. (Note: Larson (2009, p. 185): "[I]n contrast to the sruti, which Hindus, for the most part, pay little more than lip service to.")

Of the six Hindu darsanas, the Mimamsa and the Vedanta "are rooted primarily in the Vedic sruti tradition and are sometimes called smarta schools in the sense that they develop smarta orthodox current of thoughts that are based, like smriti, directly on sruti". According to Hiltebeitel, "the consolidation of Hinduism takes place under the sign of bhakti". It is the Bhagavadgita that seals this achievement. The result is a "universal achievement" that may be called smarta. It views Shiva and Vishnu as "complementary in their functions but ontologically identical".

The major Sanskrit epics, Ramayana and Mahabharata, which belong to the smriti, were compiled over a protracted period during the late centuries BCE and the early centuries CE. They contain mythological stories about the rulers and wars of ancient India, and are interspersed with religious and philosophical treatises. The later Puranas recount tales about devas and devis, their interactions with humans and their battles against rakshasa. The Bhagavad Gita "seals the achievement" of the "consolidation of Hinduism", integrating Brahmanic and sramanic ideas with theistic devotion. (Note: Arthur Llewellyn Basham, "Hinduism – The Bhagavad Gita", Encyclopædia Britannica)

==== Schools of Hindu philosophy ====
In early centuries CE several schools of Hindu philosophy were formally codified, including Samkhya, Yoga, Nyaya, Vaisheshika, Purva-Mimamsa and Vedanta.

==== Sangam literature ====
The Sangam literature (300 BCE – 400 CE), written in the Sangam period, is a mostly secular body of classical literature in the Tamil language. Nonetheless, there are some works, significantly Pattuppāṭṭu and Paripāṭal, wherein the personal devotion to God was written in the form of devotional poems. Vishnu, Shiva and Murugan were mentioned gods. These works are therefore the earliest evidence of monotheistic Bhakti traditions, preceding the large bhakti movement, which was given great attention in later times.

==== Indian trade with Africa ====
During the time of the Roman Empire, trade took place between India and east Africa, and there is archaeological evidence of small Indian presence in Zanzibar, Zimbabwe, Madagascar, and the coastal parts of Kenya along with the Swahili coast, but no conversion to Hinduism took place.

==== Hindu Colony in the Middle East (The Levant) ====
Armenian historian Zenob Glak (300–350 CE) said "there was an Indian colony in the canton of Taron on the upper Euphrates, to the west of Lake Van, as early as the second century B.C. The Indians had built there two temples containing images of gods about 18 and 22 feet high."

=== "Golden Age" of India (Gupta and Pallava period) (c. 320–650 CE) ===
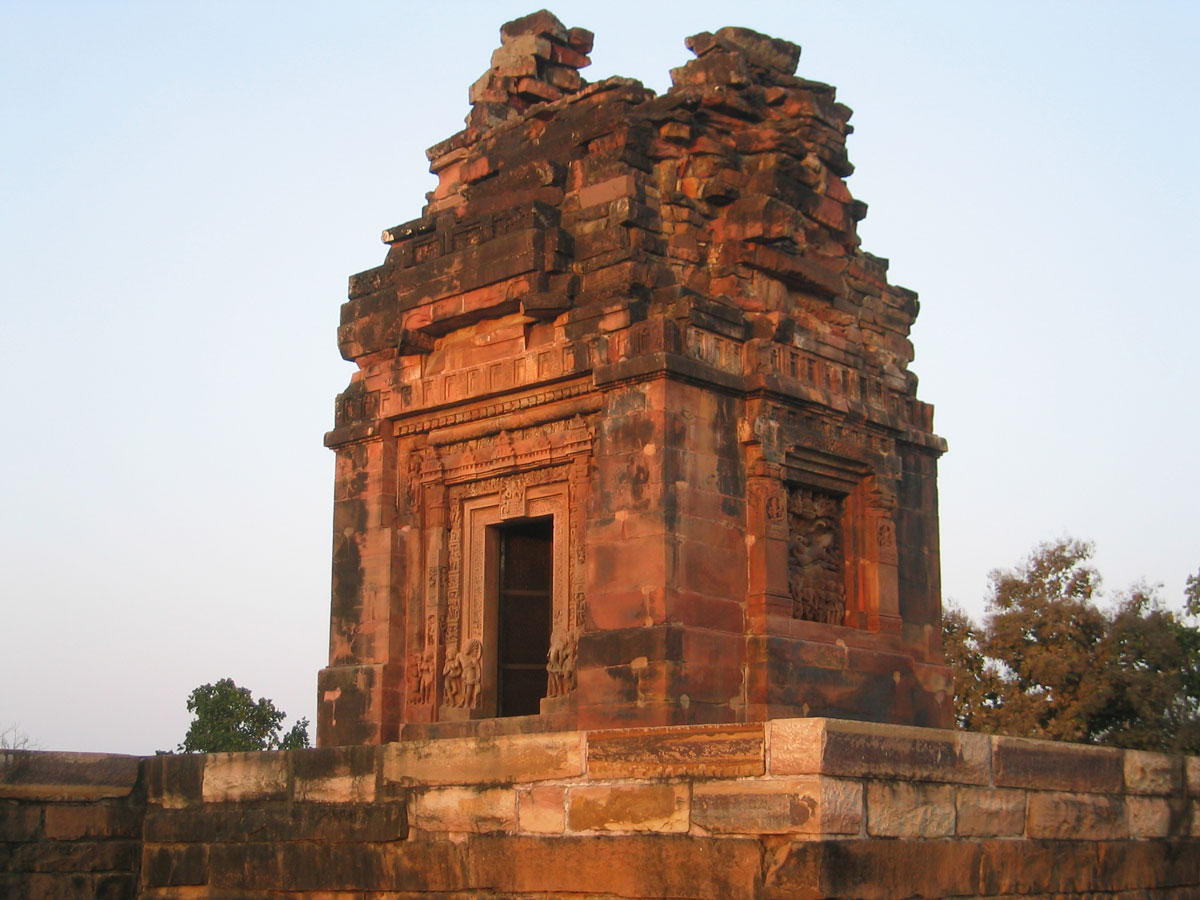
Dashavatara Temple is a Vishnu Hindu temple build during the Gupta period.

During this period, power was centralised, along with a growth of near distance trade, standardisation of legal procedures, and general spread of literacy. Mahayana Buddhism flourished, but orthodox Brahmana culture began to be rejuvenated by the patronage of the Gupta Dynasty, who were Vaishnavas. The position of the Brahmans was reinforced, the first Hindu temples dedicated to the gods of the Hindu deities, emerged during the late Gupta age. (Note: Michaels (2004, p. 40) mentions the Durga temple in Aihole and the Visnu Temple in Deogarh. Michell (1977, p. 18) notes that earlier temples were built of timber, brick and plaster, while the first stone temples appeared during the period of Gupta rule.) During the Gupta reign the first Puranas were written, which were used to disseminate "mainstream religious ideology amongst pre-literate and tribal groups undergoing acculturation". The Guptas patronised the newly emerging Puranic religion, seeking legitimacy for their dynasty. The resulting Puranic Hinduism, differed markedly from the earlier Brahmanism of the Dharmasastras and the smritis.

According to P. S. Sharma, "the Gupta and Harsha periods form really, from the strictly intellectual standpoint, the most brilliant epocha in the development of Indian philosophy", as Hindu and Buddhist philosophies flourished side by side. Charvaka, the atheistic materialist school, came to the fore in North India before the 8th century CE.

==== Gupta and Pallava Empires ====
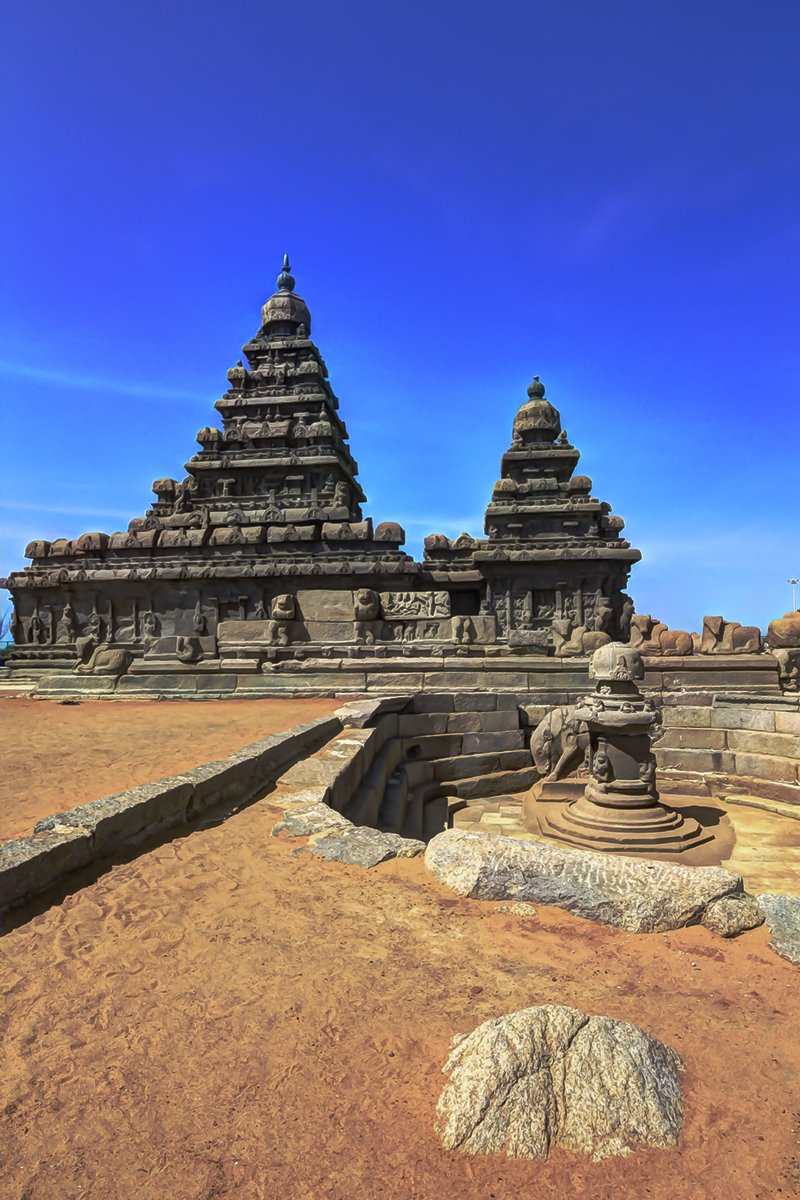
The Hindu Shore Temple (a UNESCO World Heritage Site) at Mamallapuram built by Narasimhavarman II

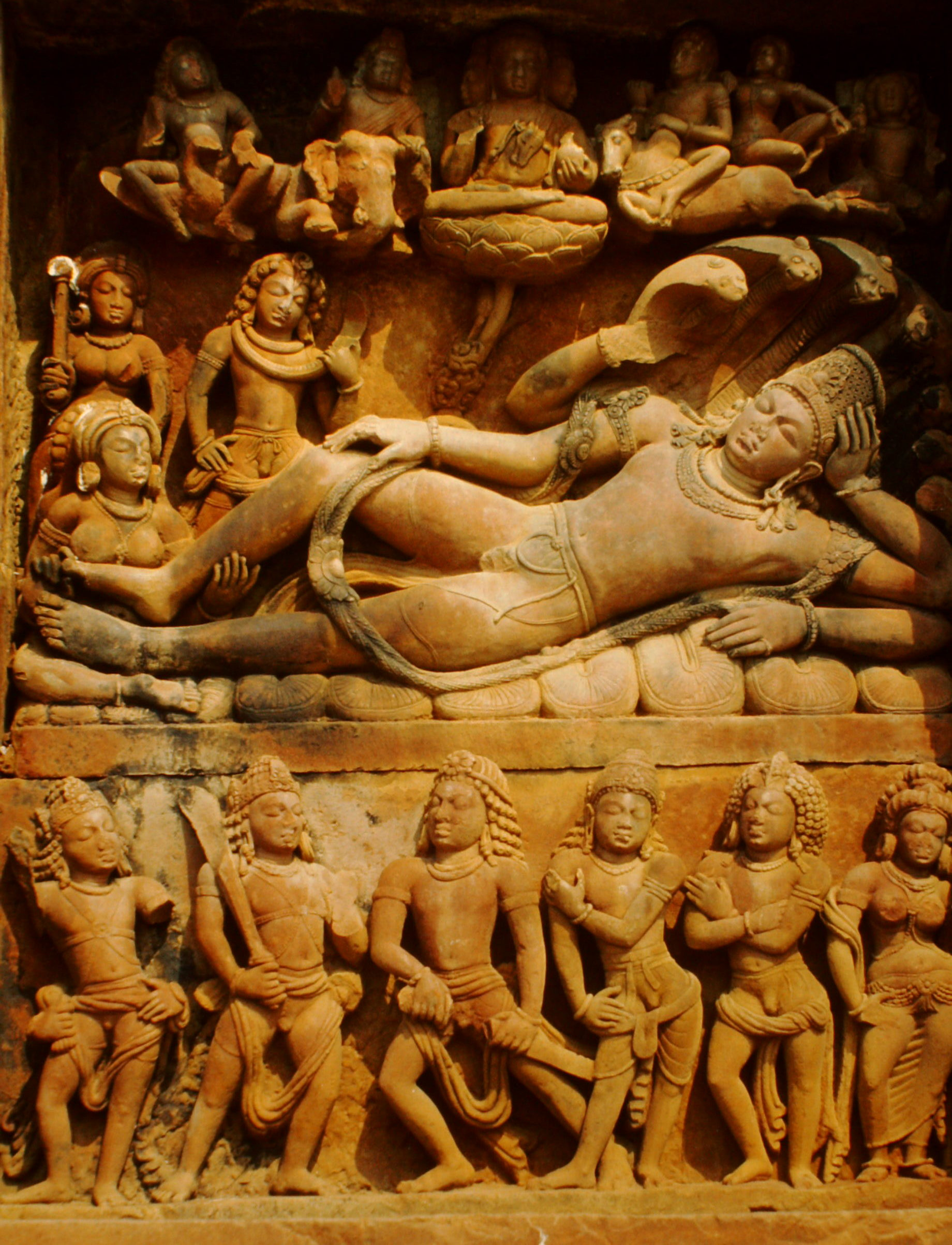
Maha Vishnu sleeping, protected by Shesha, Dashavatara Temple, Deogarh. Sculpted by Gupta Empire around 400 CE.

The Gupta period (4th to 6th centuries) saw a flowering of scholarship, the codification of the classical schools of Hindu philosophy, and of classical Sanskrit literature in general on topics ranging from medicine, veterinary science, mathematics, to astrology and astronomy and astrophysics. The famous Aryabhata and Varāhamihira belong to this age. The Gupta established a strong central government which also allowed a degree of local control. Gupta society was ordered in accordance with Brahmanical beliefs. This included a strict caste system, or class system. The peace and prosperity created under Gupta leadership enabled the pursuit of scientific and artistic endeavours.

The Pallavas (4th to 9th centuries) were, alongside the Guptas of the North, patronisers of Sanskrit in the South of the Indian subcontinent. The Pallava reign saw the first Sanskrit inscriptions in a script called Grantha. The Pallavas used Dravidian architecture to build some very important Hindu temples and academies in Mahabalipuram, Kanchipuram and other places; their rule saw the rise of great poets, who are as famous as Kalidasa.

During early Pallavas period, there are different connections to Southeast Asian and other countries. Due to it, in the Middle Ages, Hinduism became the state religion in many kingdoms of Asia, the so-called Greater India—from Afghanistan (Kabul) in the West and including almost all of Southeast Asia in the East (Cambodia, Vietnam, Indonesia, Philippines)—and only by the 15th century was near everywhere supplanted by Buddhism and Islam.

The practice of dedicating temples to different deities came into vogue followed by fine artistic temple architecture and sculpture (see Vastu shastra).

==== Bhakti ====
This period saw the emergence of the Bhakti movement. The Bhakti movement was a rapid growth of bhakti beginning in Tamil Nadu in Southern India with the Vaisnava Alvars (3rd to 9th centuries CE) and Saiva Nayanars (4th to 10th centuries CE) who spread bhakti poetry and devotion throughout India by the 12th to 18th centuries CE.

==== Expansion in South-East Asia ====
Expansion of Hinduism in Southeast Asia

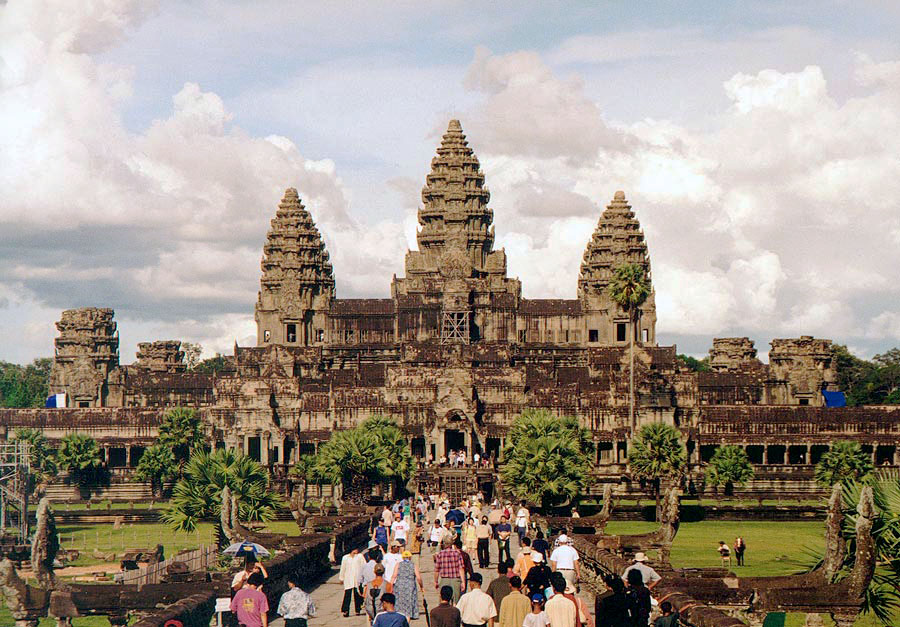
Angkor Wat in Cambodia is the largest Hindu monument in the world. It is one of hundreds of ancient Hindu temples in Southeast Asia.

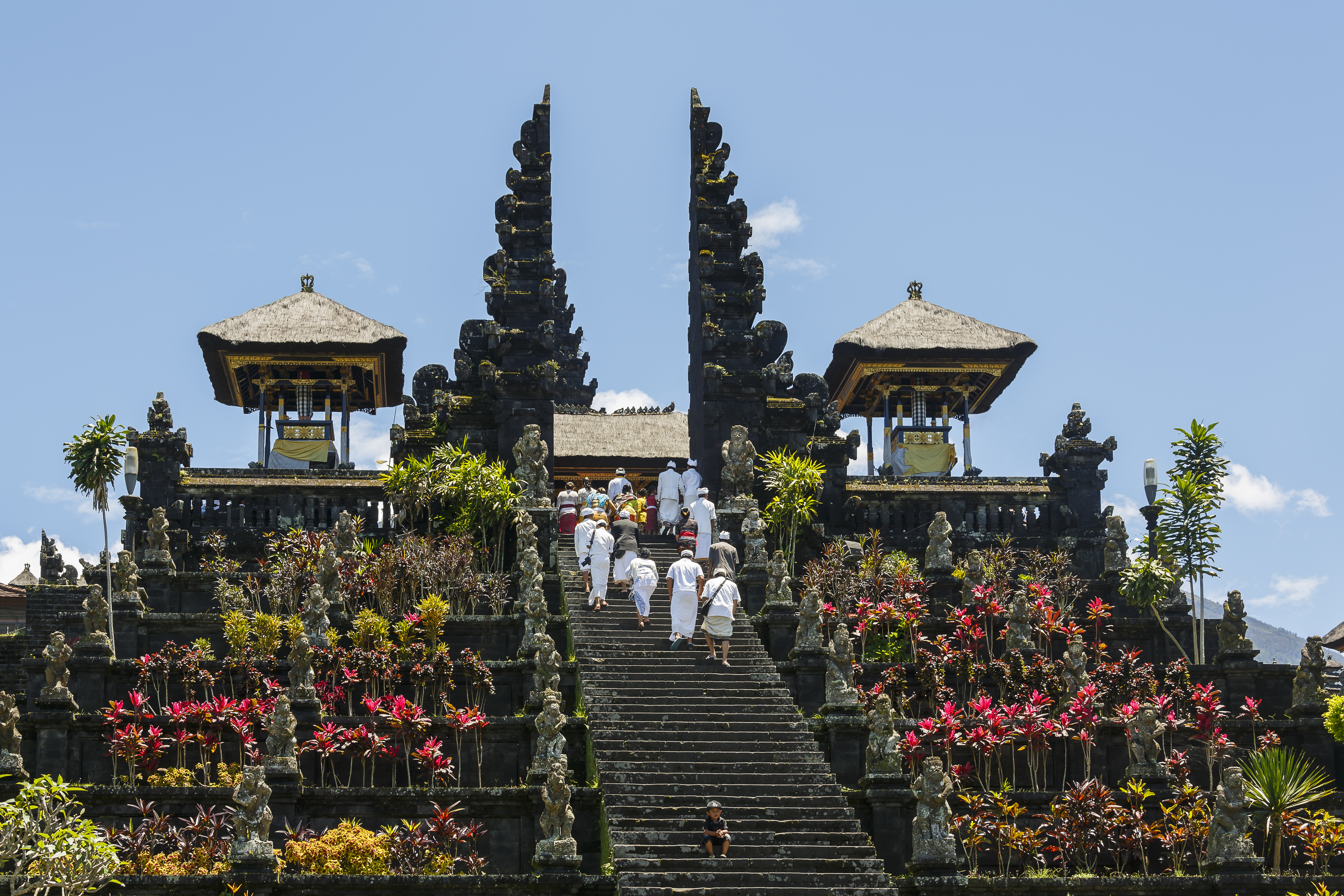
Pura Besakih, the holiest temple of Hindu religion in Bali

Hindu influences reached the Indonesian Archipelago as early as the first century. At this time, India started to strongly influence Southeast Asian countries. Trade routes linked India with southern Burma, central and southern Siam, lower Cambodia and southern Vietnam and numerous urbanised coastal settlements were established there.

For more than a thousand years, Indian Hindu/Buddhist influence was, therefore, the major factor that brought a certain level of cultural unity to the various countries of the region. The Pali and Sanskrit languages and the Indian script, together with Theravada and Mahayana Buddhism, Brahmanism and Hinduism, were transmitted from direct contact as well as through sacred texts and Indian literature, such as the Ramayana and the Mahabharata epics.

From the 5th to the 13th century, South-East Asia had very powerful Indian colonial empires and became extremely active in Hindu and Buddhist architectural and artistic creation. The Sri Vijaya Empire to the south and the Khmer Empire to the north competed for influence.

Langkasuka (-langkha Sanskrit for "resplendent land" -sukkha of "bliss") was an ancient Hindu kingdom located in the Malay Peninsula. The kingdom, along with Old Kedah settlement, are probably the earliest territorial footholds founded on the Malay Peninsula. According to tradition, the founding of the kingdom happened in the 2nd century; Malay legends claim that Langkasuka was founded at Kedah, and later moved to Pattani.

From the 5th to 15th centuries Sri Vijayan empire, a maritime empire centred on the island of Sumatra in Indonesia, had adopted Mahayana and Vajrayana Buddhism under a line of rulers named the Sailendras. The Empire of Sri Vijaya declined due to conflicts with the Chola rulers of India. The Majapahit Empire succeeded the Singhasari empire. It was one of the last and greatest Hindu empires in maritime Southeast Asia.

Funan was a pre-Angkor Cambodian kingdom, located around the Mekong delta, probably established by Mon-Khmer settlers speaking an Austroasiatic language. According to reports by two Chinese envoys, K'ang T'ai and Chu Ying, the state was established by an Indian Brahmin named Kaundinya, who in the 1st century CE was given instruction in a dream to take a magic bow from a temple and defeat a Khmer queen, Soma. Soma, the daughter of the king of the Nagas, married Kaundinya and their lineage became the royal dynasty of Funan. The myth had the advantage of providing the legitimacy of both an Indian Brahmin and the divinity of the cobras, who at that time were held in religious regard by the inhabitants of the region.

The kingdom of Champa (or Lin-yi in Chinese records) controlled what is now south and central Vietnam from approximately 192 through 1697. The dominant religion of the Cham people was Hinduism and the culture was heavily influenced by India.

Later, from the 9th to the 13th century, the Mahayana Buddhist and Hindu Khmer Empire dominated much of the South-East Asian peninsula. Under the Khmer, more than 900 temples were built in Cambodia and in neighbouring Thailand. Angkor was at the centre of this development, with a temple complex and urban organisation able to support around one million urban dwellers. The largest temple complex of the world, Angkor Wat, stands here; built by the king Vishnuvardhan.

=== Late-Classical Hinduism – Puranic Hinduism and decline of Buddhism (c. 650–1200 CE) ===
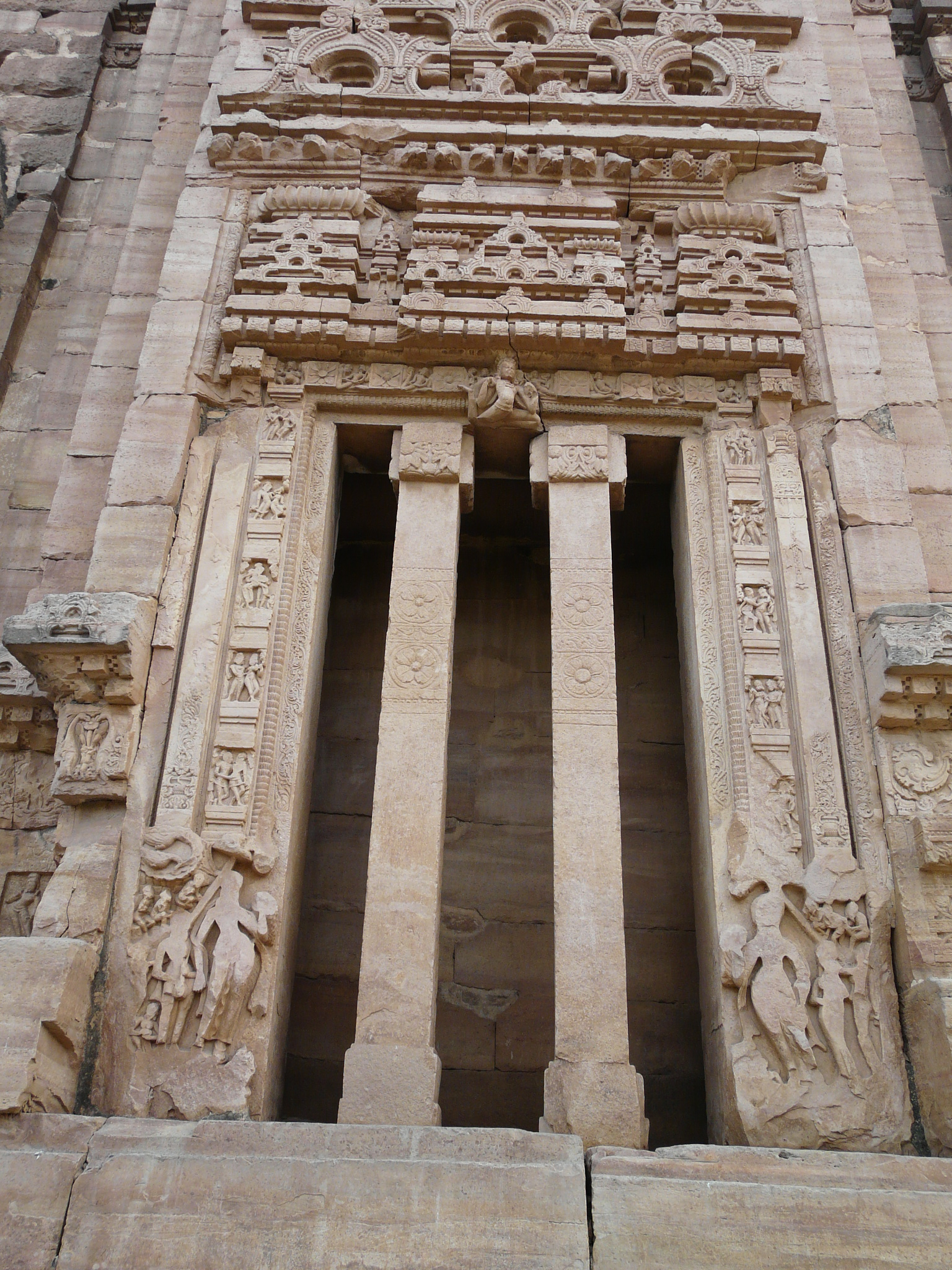
One of the four entrances of the Teli ka Mandir. This Hindu temple was built by the Gurjara-Pratihara emperor Mihira Bhoja.

After the end of the Gupta Empire and the collapse of the Harsha Empire, power became decentralised in India. Several larger kingdoms emerged, with "countless vasal states". (Note: Michaels (2004, p. 41): In the east the Pala Empire (770–1125 CE), in the west and north the Gurjara-Pratihara (7th–10th century), in the southwest the Rashtrakuta Dynasty (752–973), in the Dekkhan the Chalukya dynasty (7th–8th century), and in the south the Pallava dynasty (7th–9th century) and the Chola dynasty (9th century).) The kingdoms were ruled via a feudal system. Smaller kingdoms were dependent on the protection of the larger kingdoms. "The great king was remote, was exalted and deified", as reflected in the Tantric Mandala, which could also depict the king as the centre of the mandala.

The disintegration of central power also lead to regionalisation of religiosity, and religious rivalry. (Note: McRae (2003): This resembles the development of Chinese Chán during the An Lu-shan rebellion and the Five Dynasties and Ten Kingdoms Period (907–960/979), during which power became decentralised end new Chán-schools emerged.) Local cults and languages were enhanced, and the influence of "Brahmanic ritualistic Hinduism" was diminished. Rural and devotional movements arose, along with Shaivism, Vaisnavism, Bhakti and Tantra, though "sectarian groupings were only at the beginning of their development". Religious movements had to compete for recognition by the local lords. Buddhism lost its position after the 8th century, due to the loss of financial support from royal donors and the lack of appeal among the rural masses, and began to disappear in India. This was reflected in the change of puja-ceremonies at the courts in the 8th century, where Hindu gods replaced the Buddha as the "supreme, imperial deity". (Note: Inden (1998, p. 67): "Before the eighth century, the Buddha was accorded the position of universal deity and ceremonies by which a king attained to imperial status were elaborate donative ceremonies entailing gifts to Buddhist monks and the installation of a symbolic Buddha in a stupa ... This pattern changed in the eighth century. The Buddha was replaced as the supreme, imperial deity by one of the Hindu gods (except under the Palas of eastern India, the Buddha's homeland) ... Previously the Buddha had been accorded imperial-style worship (puja). Now as one of the Hindu gods replaced the Buddha at the imperial centre and pinnacle of the cosmo-political system, the image or symbol of the Hindu god comes to be housed in a monumental temple and given increasingly elaborate imperial-style puja worship.")

==== Puranic Hinduism ====
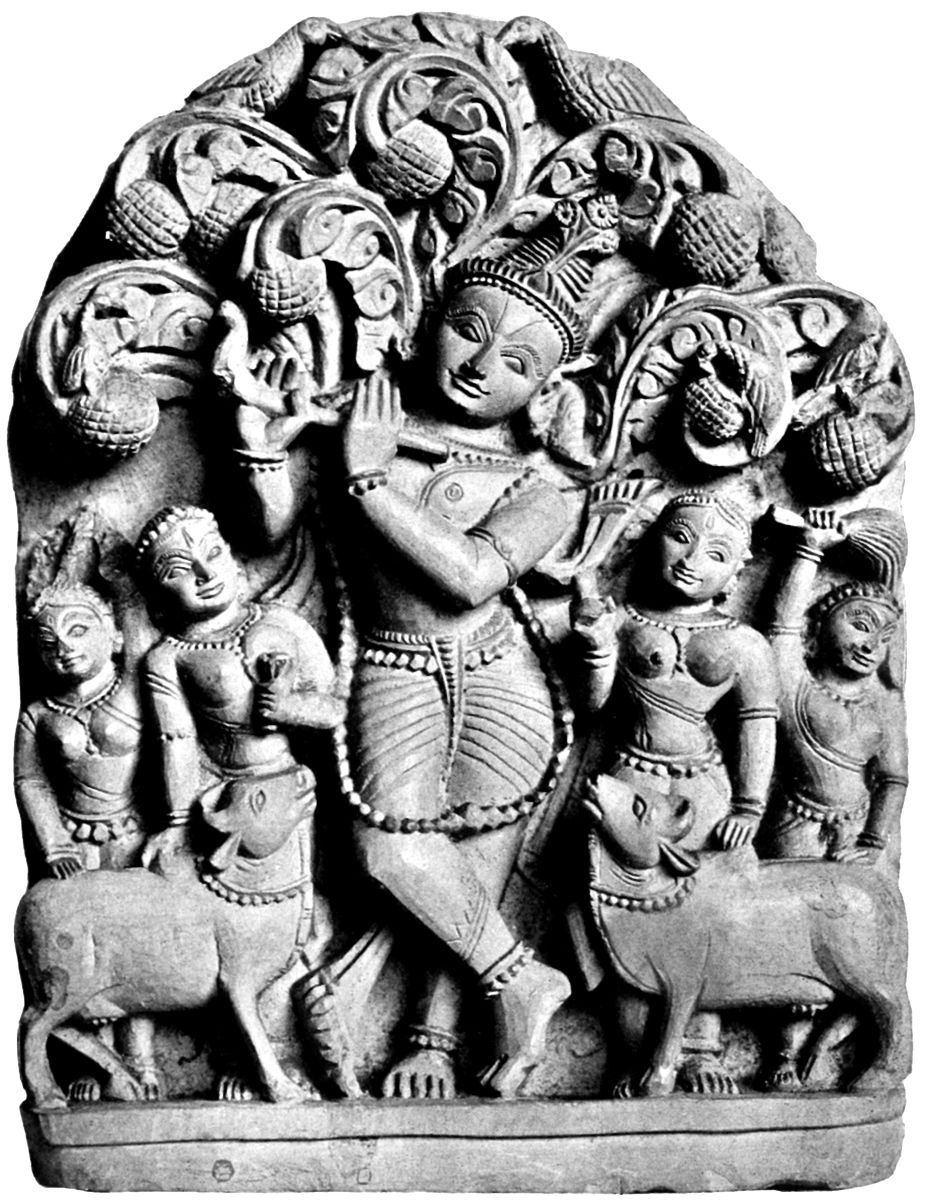
The mythology in the Puranas has inspired many reliefs and sculptures found in Hindu temples. The legend behind the Krishna and Gopis relief above is described in the Bhagavata Purana.

The Brahmanism of the Dharmaśāstra and the smritis underwent a radical transformation at the hands of the Purana composers, resulting in the rise of Puranic Hinduism, "which like a colossus striding across the religious firmanent soon came to overshadow all existing religions". Puranic Hinduism was a "multiplex belief-system which grew and expanded as it absorbed and synthesised polaristic ideas and cultic traditions". It was distinguished from its Vedic Smarta roots by its popular base, its theological and sectarian pluralism, its Tantric veneer, and the central place of bhakti.

The early mediaeval Puranas were composed to disseminate religious mainstream ideology among the pre-literate tribal societies undergoing acculturation. With the breakdown of the Gupta empire, gifts of virgin waste-land were heaped on brahmanas, to ensure profitable agrarian exploitation of land owned by the kings, but also to provide status to the new ruling classes. Brahmanas spread further over India, interacting with local clans with different religions and ideologies. The Brahmanas used the Puranas to incorporate those clans into the agrarian society and its accompanying religion and ideology. According to Flood, "[t]he Brahmans who followed the puranic religion became known as smarta, those whose worship was based on the smriti, or pauranika, those based on the Puranas." Local chiefs and peasants were absorbed into the varna, which was used to keep "control over the new kshatriyas and shudras."

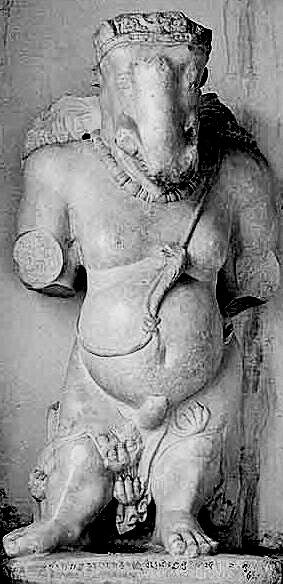
The Gardez Ganesha, a statue of the Hindu deity Ganesha, consecrated in the mid-8th century CE, during the Turk Shahi era, in Gardez, Afghanistan

The Brahmanic group was enlarged by incorporating local subgroups, such as local priests. This also lead to stratification within the Brahmins, with some Brahmins having a lower status than other Brahmins. The use of caste worked better with the new Puranic Hinduism than with the Sramanic sects. The Puranic texts provided extensive genealogies which gave status to the new kshatriyas. Buddhist myths pictured government as a contract between an elected ruler and the people. And the Buddhist chakkavatti (Note: Thapar (2003, p. 325): The king who ruled not by conquest but by setting in motion the wheel of law.) "was a distinct concept from the models of conquest held up to the kshatriyas and the Rajputs".

Many local religions and traditions were assimilated into puranic Hinduism. Vishnu and Shiva emerged as the main deities, together with Shakti/Devi. Vishnu subsumed the cults of Narayana, Jagannaths, Venkateswara "and many others". Nath:

[S]ome incarnations of Vishnu such as Matsya, Kurma, Varaha and perhaps even Nrsimha helped to incorporate certain popular totem symbols and creation myths, especially those related to wild boar, which commonly permeate preliterate mythology, others such as Krsna and Balarama became instrumental in assimilating local cults and myths centering around two popular pastoral and agricultural gods.

The transformation of Brahmanism into Pauranic Hinduism in post-Gupta India was due to a process of acculturation. The Puranas helped establish a religious mainstream among the pre-literate tribal societies undergoing acculturation. The tenets of Brahmanism and of the Dharmashastras underwent a radical transformation at the hands of the Purana composers, resulting in the rise of a mainstream "Hinduism" that overshadowed all earlier traditions.

==== Bhakti movement ====
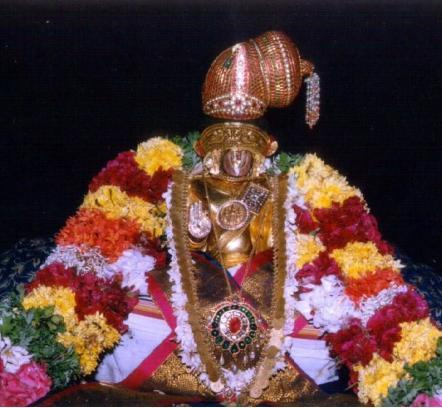
The Vaishnavite Saint Nammalvar. He is one of the most prominent of the 12 Alvars of the Sri Vaishnavism Bhakti movement.

Rama and Krishna became the focus of a strong bhakti tradition, which found expression particularly in the Bhagavata Purana. The Krishna tradition subsumed numerous Naga, yaksa and hill and tree-based cults. Shiva absorbed local cults by the suffixing of Isa or Isvara to the name of the local deity, for example, Bhutesvara, Hatakesvara, and Chandesvara. In 8th-century royal circles, the Buddha started to be replaced by Hindu gods in pujas. This also was the same period of time the Buddha was made into an avatar of Vishnu.

The first documented Bhakti movement was founded by the first three Vaishnavite Alvars. Traditionally, the Alvars are considered to have lived between 4200 BCE and 2700 BCE, while some texts account for range between 4200 BCE and early 5th century. Traditional dates take them to the age of Shuka from the period of the Mahabharata and Bhagavata Purana, the first four (Poigai Alvar, Bhoothath Alvar, Peyalvar and Tirumalisai Alvar) are from the Dvapara Yuga, while Nammalvar, Madhurakavi Alvar and others belong to the Kali Yuga. Shuka is dated minimum around 200 BCE. Hence the first three Alvars are also considered minimum 200 BCE. The twelve Alvars who were Vaishnavite devotees and the sixty-three Nayanars who were Shaivite devotees nurtured the incipient Bhakti movement in Tamil Nadu.

During the 12th century CE in Karnataka, the Bhakti movement took the form of the Virashaiva movement. It was inspired by Basavanna, a Hindu reformer who created the sect of Lingayats or Shiva bhaktas. During this time, a unique and native form of Kannada literature-poetry called Vachanas was born.

==== Advaita Vedanta ====
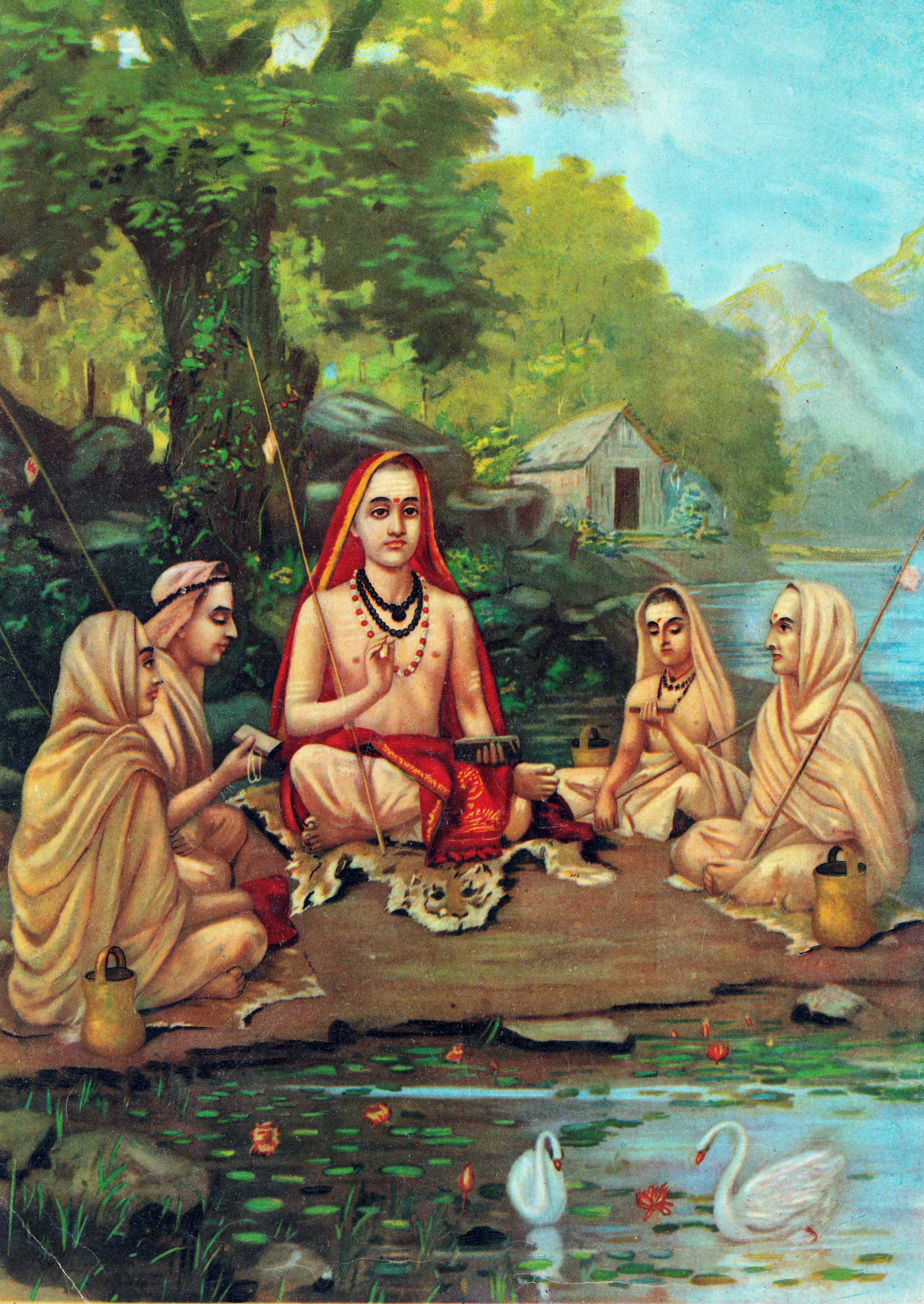
Adi Shankara is credited with unifying and establishing the main currents of thought in Hinduism.

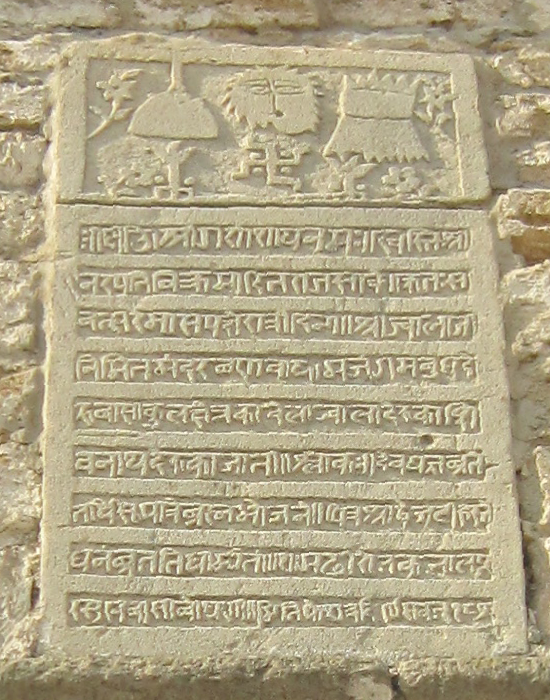
An inscribed invocation to Shiva in Sanskrit at the Ateshgah of Baku, west of the Caspian Sea

The early Advaitin Gaudapada (6th–7th c. CE) was influenced by Buddhism. Gaudapda took over the Buddhist doctrines that ultimate reality is pure consciousness (vijñapti-mātra) and "that the nature of the world is the four-cornered negation". Gaudapada "wove [both doctrines] into a philosophy of the Mandukya Upanishad, which was further developed by Shankara". Gaudapada also took over the Buddhist concept of "ajāta" from Nagarjuna's Madhyamaka philosophy. Gaudapada seems to have ignored the Brahma-sutras, and it was Shankara who succeeded in reading Gaudapada's mayavada, a polemic term used by opponents, (Note: The term "mayavada" is still being used, in a critical way, by the Hare Krshnas. See (Note: Mayavada Philosophy Archived 14 February 2017 at the Wayback Machine harekrishnatemple.com) (Note: The Mayavada School Archived 14 December 2016 at the Wayback Machine harekrsna.com) (Note: Gaura Gopala Dasa, The Self-Defeating Philosophy of Mayavada Archived 15 December 2018 at the Wayback Machine)) into Badarayana's Brahma Sutras, "and give it a locus classicus", against the realistic strain of the Brahma Sutras.

Shankara (8th century CE) was a scholar who synthesised and systematised Advaita Vedanta views which already existed at his lifetime. (Note: Neil Dalal (2021), "Shankara",, Stanford Encyclopedia of Philosophy) Shankara propounded a unified reality, in which the innermost self of a person (atman) and the supernatural power of the entire world (brahman) are one and the same. Perceiving the changing multiplicity of forms and objects as the final reality is regarded as maya, "illusion", obscuring the unchanging ultimate reality of brahman.

While Shankara has an unparalleled status in the history of Advaita Vedanta, Shankara's early influence in India is doubtful. Until the 11th century, Vedanta itself was a peripheral school of thought, and until the 10th century Shankara himself was overshadowed by his older contemporary Maṇḍana Miśra, who was considered to be the major representative of Advaita.

Several scholars suggest that the historical fame and cultural influence of Shankara and Advaita Vedanta grew only centuries later, during the era of the Muslim invasions and consequent devastation of India, due to the efforts of Vidyaranya (14th c.), who created legends to turn Shankara into a "divine folk-hero who spread his teaching through his digvijaya ("universal conquest") all over India like a victorious conqueror."

Shankara's position was further established in the 19th and 20th centuries, when neo-Vedantins and western Orientalists elevated Advaita Vedanta "as the connecting theological thread that united Hinduism into a single religious tradition". Advaita Vedanta has acquired a broad acceptance in Indian culture and beyond as the paradigmatic example of Hindu spirituality, Shankara became "an iconic representation of Hindu religion and culture", despite the fact that most Hindus do not adhere to Advaita Vedanta.

==== Contact with Persia and Mesopotamia ====
Hindu and also Buddhist religious and secular learning had first reached Persia in an organised manner in the 6th century, when the Sassanid Emperor Khosrow I (531–579) deputed Borzuya the physician as his envoy, to invite Indian and Chinese scholars to the Academy of Gondishapur. Burzoe had translated the Sanskrit Panchatantra. His Pahlavi version was translated into Arabic by Ibn al-Muqaffa' under the title of Kalila and Dimna or The Fables of Bidpai.

Under the Abbasid caliphate, Baghdad had replaced Gundeshapur as the most important centre of learning in the then vast Islamic Empire, wherein the traditions, as well as scholars of the latter, flourished. Hindu scholars were invited to the conferences on sciences and mathematics held in Baghdad.

== Medieval and early modern periods (c. 1200–1850 CE) ==
=== Muslim period ===
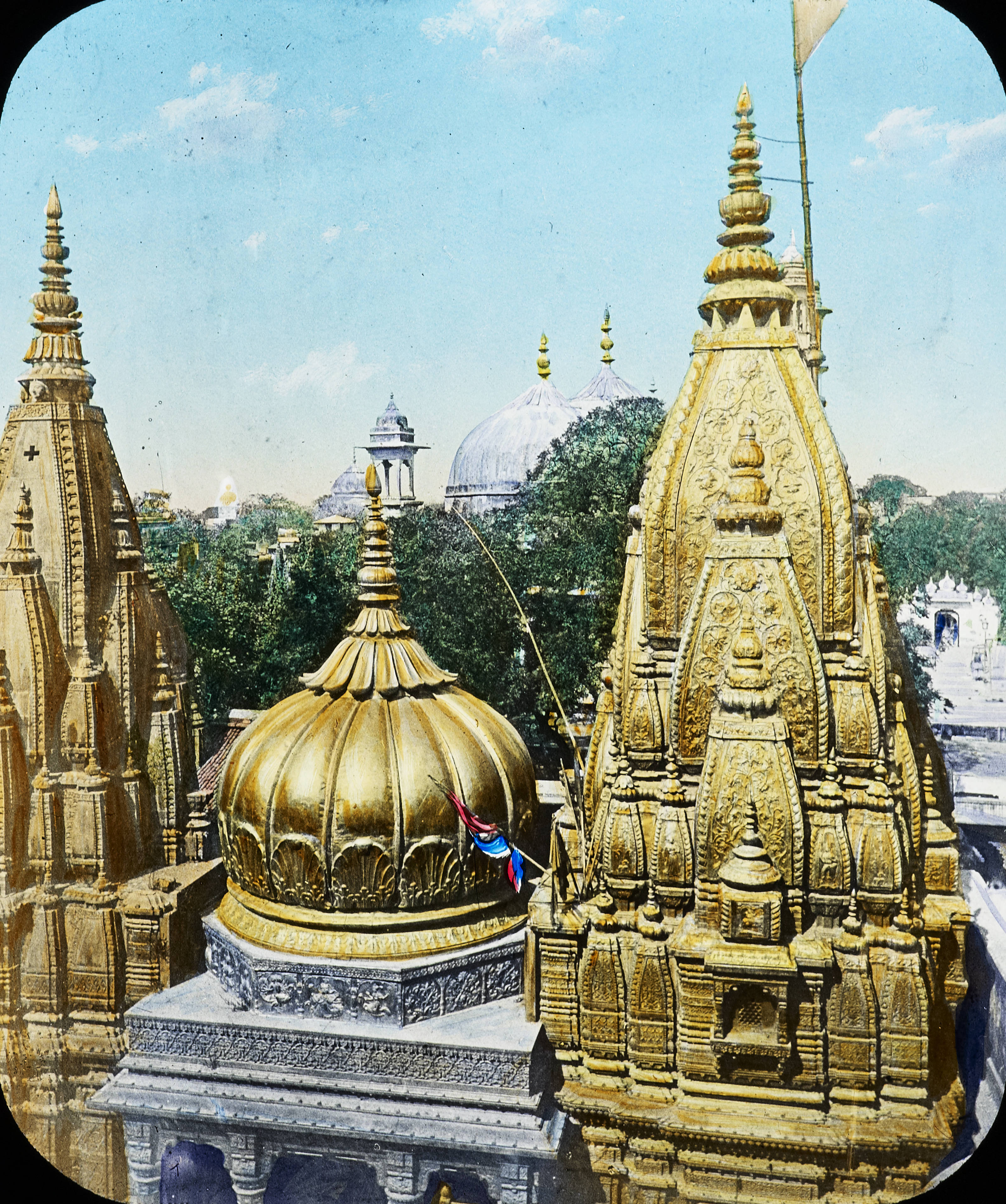
The Kashi Vishwanath Temple was destroyed by the army of Delhi Sultan Qutb ud-Din Aibak.

The Muslim conquests in the Indian subcontinent took place between the 13th and the 18th centuries. The Ghurid ruler Muhammad of Ghor laid the foundation of Muslim rule in India in 1192, expanding up to Bengal by 1202. The Ghurid Empire soon evolved into the Delhi Sultanate in 1206, transitioning to the Mamluk dynasty. During this historical period, Buddhism experienced a decline, and there were instances of religious tensions and conflicts in the Indian subcontinent. Some records indicate incidents of raids, property seizures, and the enslavement of some Hindu families. Additionally, there were accounts suggesting that some Hindus may have converted to Islam, possibly under various circumstances, including to secure their freedom. In between the periods of wars and conquests, there were periods of cooperation and syncretism. There were harmonious Hindu-Muslim relations in most Indian communities. No populations were expelled based on their religion by either the Muslim or Hindu kings, nor were attempts made to annihilate a specific religion.

In the 16th century, the Mughal Empire was established. Under the Mughals, India experienced a period of relative stability and prosperity. The Mughals were generally known for their religious tolerance, and they actively patronised the arts and literature. There were instances of religious conflicts between the Mughals and the Rajput over control of territories. Aurangzeb in particular was noted for his policies of religious intolerance towards non-Muslims and destruction of temples. (Note: "Aurangzeb: Religious Policies". Manas Group, UCLA.)

The impact and consequences of the Muslim conquest of South Asia remain subjects of scrutiny and diverse viewpoints. Will Durant characterises the Muslim conquest of India as a particularly tumultuous chapter in history. He suggests that it was marked by significant violence and upheaval, which he attributes in part to factors such as internal divisions, the influence of religions like Buddhism and Jainism. Alain Daniélou criticised the Muslim rulers, claiming that the violence was often justified in the name of religious holy wars. Other, like Sir Thomas Arnold and De Lacy O'Leary, criticised the view that Islam was spread by force and sword as 'absurd.' According to Ira Lapidus, while instances of forced conversion in Muslim regions did occur, they were relatively infrequent. Muslim conquerors generally sought to exert control rather than enforce conversion, with the majority of conversions to Islam being voluntary in nature.

=== Bhakti Vedanta ===
Teachers such as Ramanuja, Madhva, and Chaitanya aligned the Bhakti movement with the textual tradition of Vedanta, which until the 11th century was only a peripheral school of thought, while rejecting and opposing the abstract notions of Advaita. Instead, they promoted emotional, passionate devotion towards the more accessible Avatars, especially Krishna and Rama.

=== Unifying Hinduism ===
According to Nicholson, already between the 12th and the 16th century, "certain thinkers began to treat as a single whole the diverse philosophical teachings of the Upanishads, epics, Puranas, and the schools known retrospectively as the 'six systems' (saddarsana) of mainstream Hindu philosophy." (Note: The tendency of "a blurring of philosophical distinctions" has also been noted by Burley (2007, p. 34). Lorenzen locates the origins of a distinct Hindu identity in the interaction between Muslims and Hindus (Lorenzen 2006, pp. 24–33), and a process of "mutual self-definition with a contrasting Muslim other" which started well before 1800 (Lorenzen 2006, pp. 26–27). Both the Indian and the European thinkers who developed the term "Hinduism" in the 19th century were influenced by these philosophers (Nicholson 2010, p. 2)) Michaels notes that a historicisation emerged which preceded later nationalism, articulating ideas which glorified Hinduism and the past.

Several scholars suggest that the historical fame and cultural influence of Shankara and Advaita Vedanta was intentionally established during this period. Vidyaranya (14th c.), also known as Madhava and a follower of Shankara, created legends to turn Shankara, whose elevated philosophy had no appeal to gain widespread popularity, into a "divine folk-hero who spread his teaching through his digvijaya ("universal conquest") all over India like a victorious conqueror." In his sarva-darśana-sangraha ("Summary of all views") Vidyaranya presented Shankara's teachings as the summit of all darsanas, presenting the other darsanas as partial truths which converged in Shankara's teachings. Vidyaranya enjoyed royal support, and his sponsorship and methodical efforts helped establish Shankara as a rallying symbol of values, spread historical and cultural influence of Shankara's Vedānta philosophies, and establish monasteries (mathas) to expand the cultural influence of Shankara and Advaita Vedānta.

=== Eastern Ganga and Surya States ===
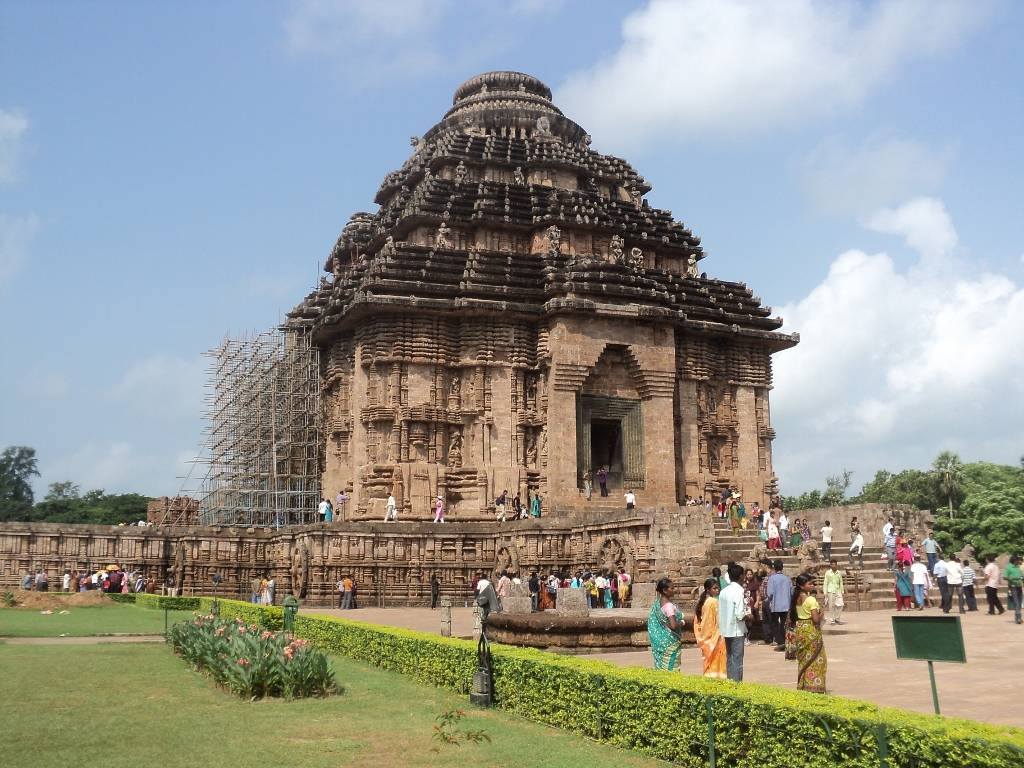
Konark Sun Temple at Konark, Odisha, built by Narasimhadeva I (1238–1264 CE) of the Eastern Ganga dynasty

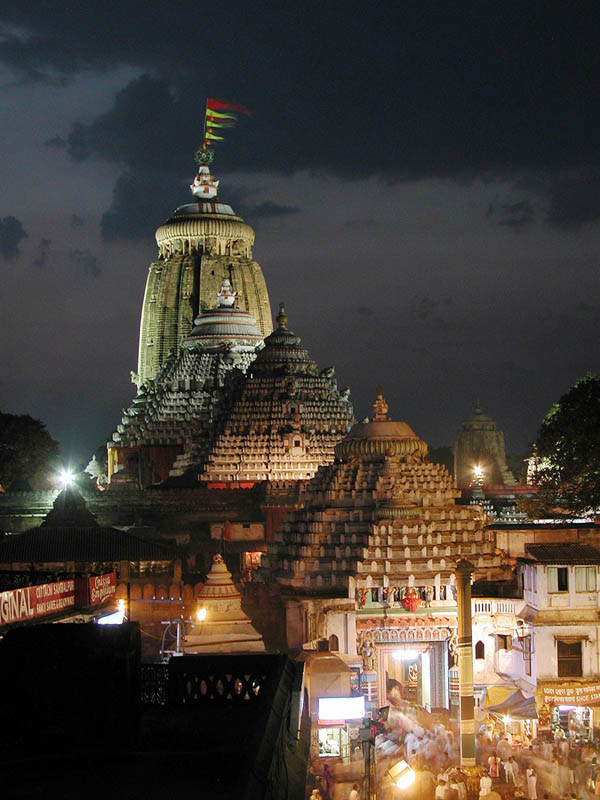
Jagannath Temple, Puri built by Anantavarman Chodaganga Deva

Eastern Ganga and Surya were Hindu polities, which ruled much of present-day Odisha (historically known as Kalinga) from the 11th century until the mid-16th century CE. During the 13th and 14th centuries, when large parts of India were under the rule of Muslim powers, an independent Kalinga became a stronghold of Hindu religion, philosophy, art, and architecture. The Eastern Ganga rulers were great patrons of religion and the arts, and the temples they built are considered among the masterpieces of Hindu architecture.

=== Early Modern period (c. 1500–1850 CE) ===
The fall of Vijayanagara Empire to Muslim rulers had marked the end of Hindu imperial defences in the Deccan. But, taking advantage of an over-stretched Mughal Empire (1526–1857), Hinduism once again rose to political prestige, under the Maratha Empire, from 1674 to 1818.

==== Vijayanagara Empire ====
The Vijayanagara Empire was established in 1336 by Harihara I and his brother Bukka Raya I of the Sangama dynasty, which originated as a political heir of the Hoysala Empire, Kakatiya Empire, and the Pandyan Empire. The empire rose to prominence as a culmination of attempts by the south Indian powers to ward off Islamic invasions by the end of the 13th century. According to one narrative, the empire's founders Harihara I and Bukka Raya I were two brothers in the service of the Kampili chief. After Kampili fell to the Muslim invasion, they were taken to Delhi and converted to Islam. They were sent back to Kampili as the Delhi Sultan's vassals. After gaining power in the region, they approached Vidyaranya, who converted them back to the Hindu faith.

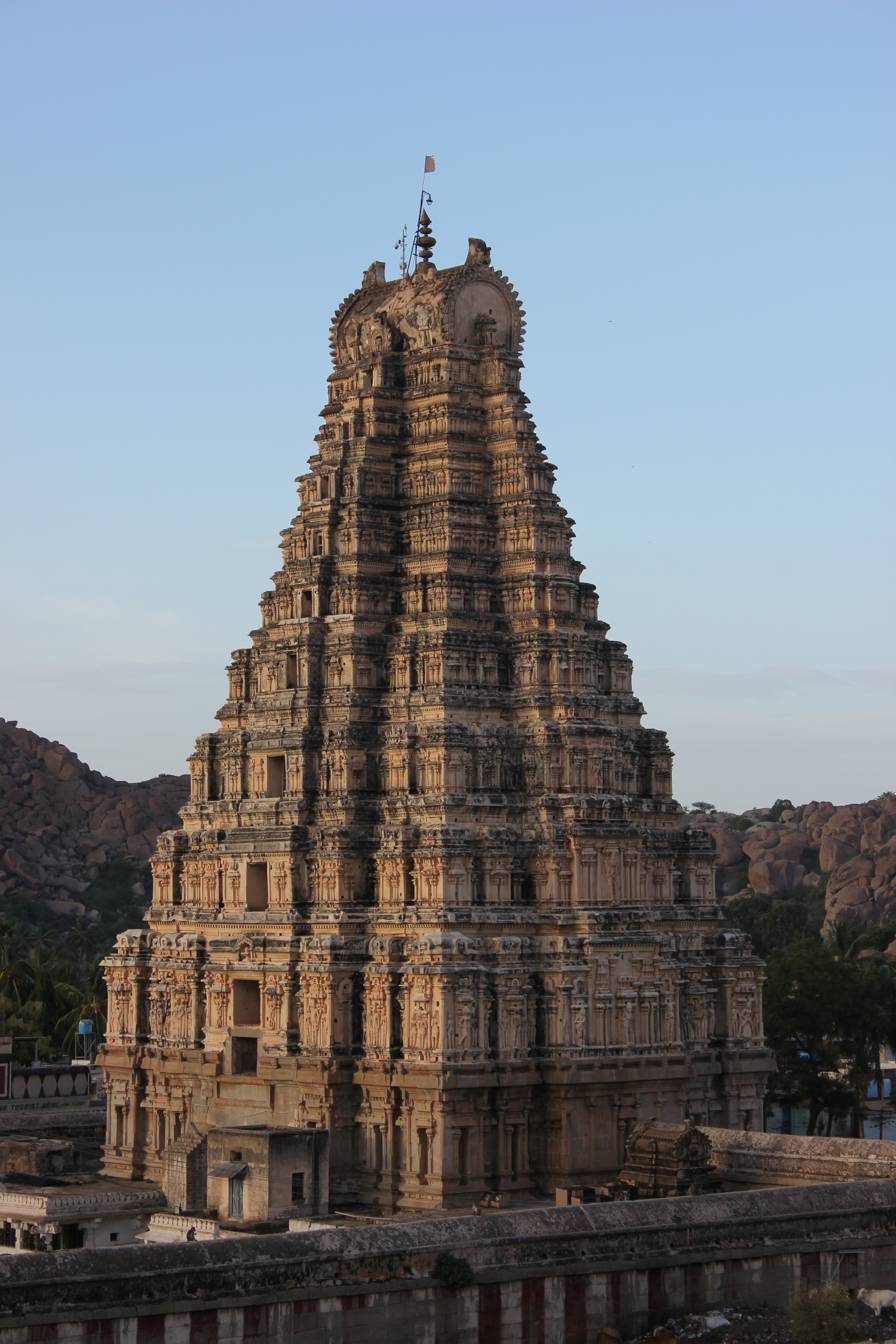
Virupaksha Temple is dedicated to Lord Virupaksha, a form of Shiva

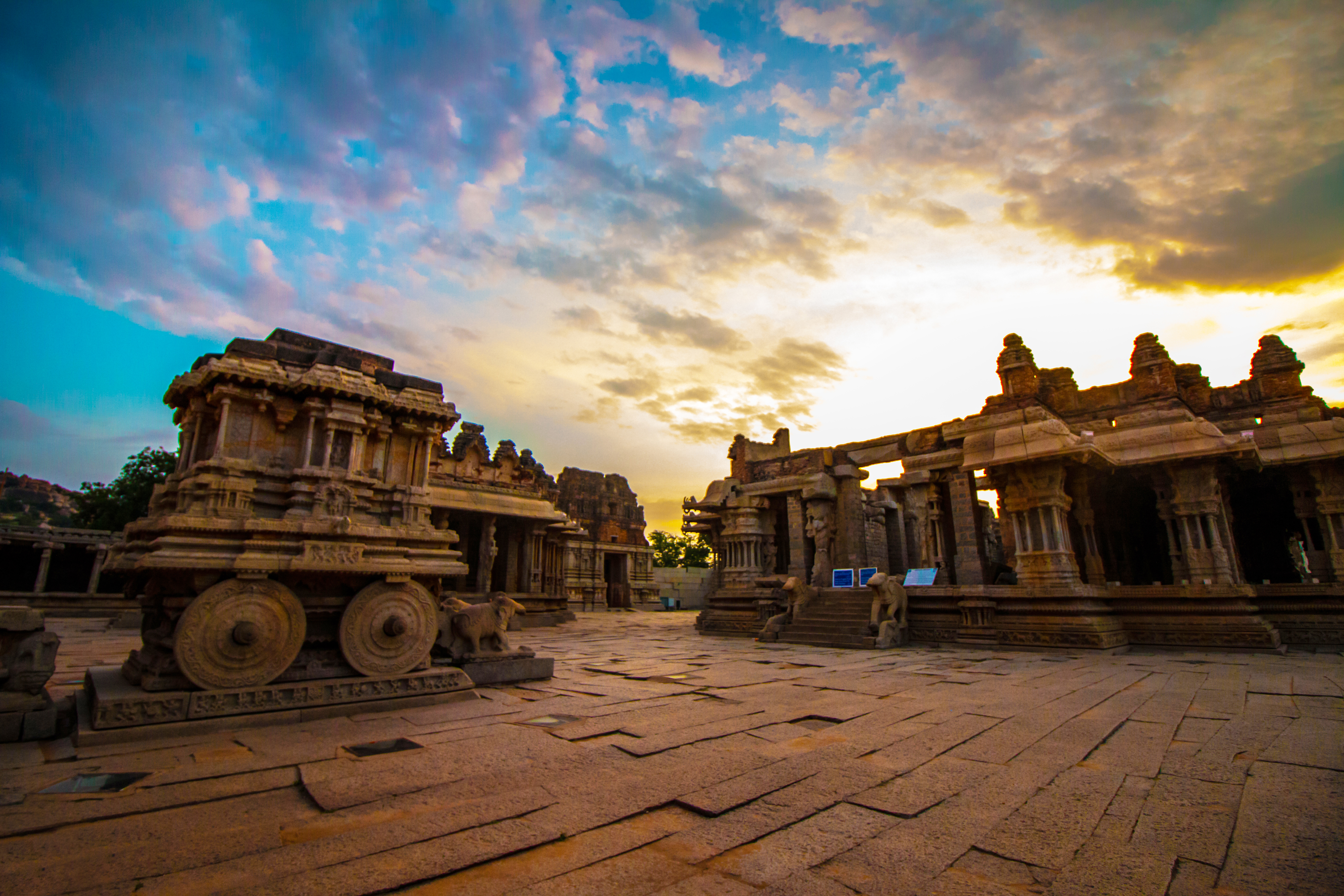
Stone temple car in the Vitthala Temple at Hampi

The Vijayanagara Emperors were tolerant of all religions and sects, as writings by foreign visitors show. The kings used titles such as Gobrahamana Pratipalanacharya (literally, "protector of cows and Brahmins") and Hindurayasuratrana (lit. "upholder of Hindu faith") that testified to their intention of protecting Hinduism and yet were at the same time staunchly Islamicate in their court ceremonials and dress. The empire's founders, Harihara I and Bukka Raya I, were devout Shaivas (worshippers of Shiva), but made grants to the Vaishnava order of Sringeri with Vidyaranya as their patron saint, and designated Varaha (the boar, an avatar of Vishnu) as their emblem. Over one-fourth of the archaeological dig found an "Islamic Quarter" not far from the "Royal Quarter". Nobles from Central Asia's Timurid kingdoms also came to Vijayanagara. The later Saluva and Tuluva kings were Vaishnava by faith, but worshipped at the feet of Virupaksha (Shiva) at Hampi as well as Venkateswara (Vishnu) at Tirupati. A Sanskrit work, Jambavati Kalyanam by King Krishnadevaraya, called Virupaksha Karnata Rajya Raksha Mani ("protective jewel of Karnata Empire"). The kings patronised the saints of the dvaita order (philosophy of dualism) of Madhvacharya at Udupi.

The Bhakti (devotional) movement was active during this time, and involved well known Haridasas (devotee saints) of that time. Like the Virashaiva movement of the 12th century, this movement presented another strong current of devotion, pervading the lives of millions. The haridasas represented two groups, the Vyasakuta and Dasakuta, the former being required to be proficient in the Vedas, Upanishads and other Darshanas, while the Dasakuta merely conveyed the message of Madhvacharya through the Kannada language to the people in the form of devotional songs (Devaranamas and Kirthanas). The philosophy of Madhvacharya was spread by eminent disciples such as Naraharitirtha, Jayatirtha, Sripadaraya, Vyasatirtha, Vadirajatirtha and others. Vyasatirtha, the guru (teacher) of Vadirajatirtha, Purandaradasa (Father of Carnatic music (Note: Owing to his contributions to carnatic music, Purandaradasa is known as Karnataka Sangita Pitamaha. (Kamat, Saint Purandaradasa))) and Kanakadasa earned the devotion of King Krishnadevaraya. The king considered the saint his Kuladevata (family deity) and honoured him in his writings. During this time, another great composer of early carnatic music, Annamacharya composed hundreds of Kirthanas in Telugu at Tirumala – Tirupati, in present-day Andhra Pradesh.

The Vijayanagara Empire created an epoch in South Indian history that transcended regionalism by promoting Hinduism as a unifying factor. The empire reached its peak during the rule of Sri Krishnadevaraya when Vijayanagara armies were consistently victorious. The empire annexed areas formerly under the Sultanates in the northern Deccan and the territories in the eastern Deccan, including Kalinga, while simultaneously maintaining control over all its subordinates in the south. Many important monuments were either completed or commissioned during the time of Krishna Deva Raya.

Vijayanagara went into decline after the defeat in the Battle of Talikota (1565). After the death of Aliya Rama Raya in the Battle of Talikota, Tirumala Deva Raya started the Aravidu dynasty, moved and founded a new capital of Penukonda to replace the destroyed Hampi, and attempted to reconstitute the remains of Vijayanagara Empire. Tirumala abdicated in 1572, dividing the remains of his kingdom to his three sons, and pursued a religious life until his death in 1578. The Aravidu dynasty successors ruled the region but the empire collapsed in 1614, and the final remains ended in 1646, from continued wars with the Bijapur Sultanate and others. During this period, more kingdoms in South India became independent and separate from Vijayanagara. These include the Mysore Kingdom, Keladi Nayaka, Nayaks of Madurai, Nayaks of Tanjore, Nayakas of Chitradurga and Nayak Kingdom of Gingee – all of which declared independence and went on to have a significant impact on the history of South India in the coming centuries.

==== Renovations of temples by the Vijayanagara Empire ====
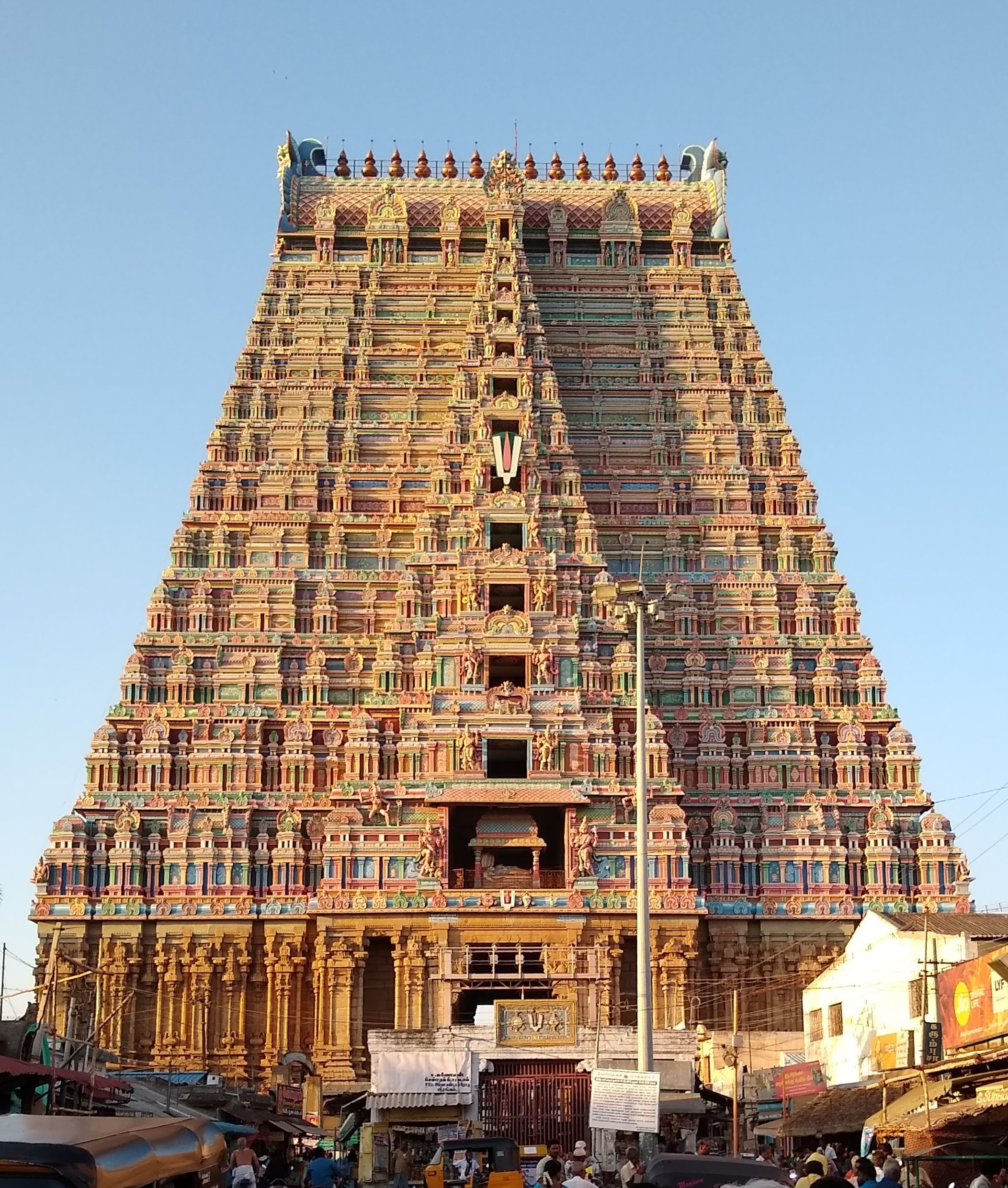
Ranganathaswamy Temple, Srirangam in Srirangam. The temple complex has been nominated as a UNESCO World Heritage Site.

The Vijayanagara Empire renovated many ancient temples of Ancient Tamilakam, they made significant contributions to temples like Srirangam Ranganathaswamy Perumal temple, Madurai Meenakshi Amman Temple, Kallalagar temple, Rajagopalaswamy Temple, Mannargudi and many more.

Srirangam Ranganathaswamy Perumal temple under the Vijayanagara Empire site saw over 200 years of stability, repairs, first round of fortifications, and addition of mandapas. The Maha Vishnu and Mahalakshmi images were reinstalled and the site became a Hindu temple again in 1371 CE under Kumara Kampana, a Vijayanagara commander and the son of Bukka I. In the last decade of the 14th century, a pillared antechamber was gifted by the Vijayanagara rulers. In the 15th century, they coated the apsidal roofs with solid gold sheets, followed by financing the addition of a series of new shrines, mandapas and gopuras to the temple.The Nayakas fortified the temple town and the seven prakaras. Now this temple is the largest temple compound in India and one of the largest religious complexes in the world. Some of these structures have been renovated, expanded and rebuilt over the centuries as a living temple. Srirangam temple is often listed as one of the largest functioning Hindu temple in the world.

==== Mughal period ====
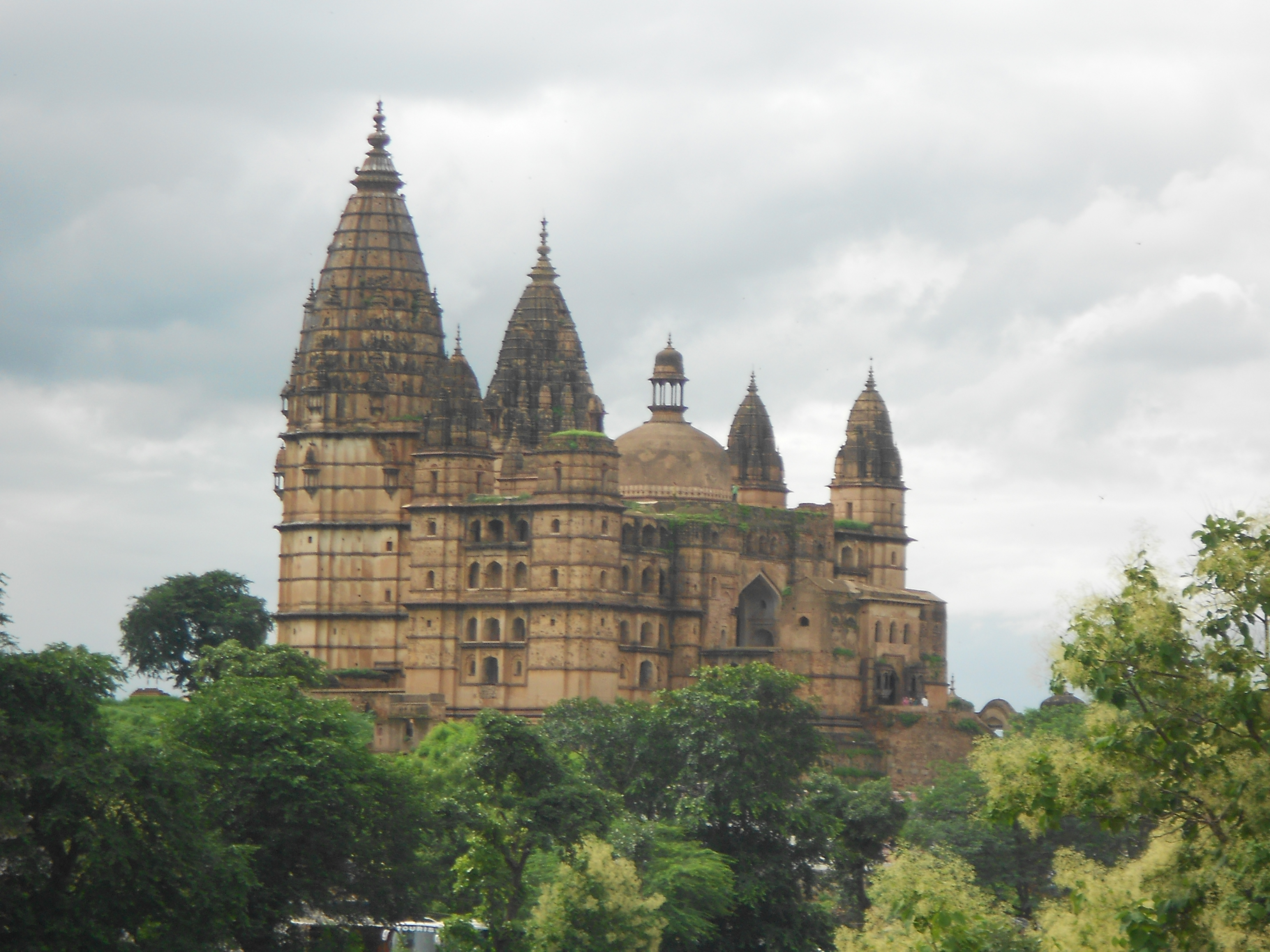
Chaturbhuj Temple, dedicated to Vishnu

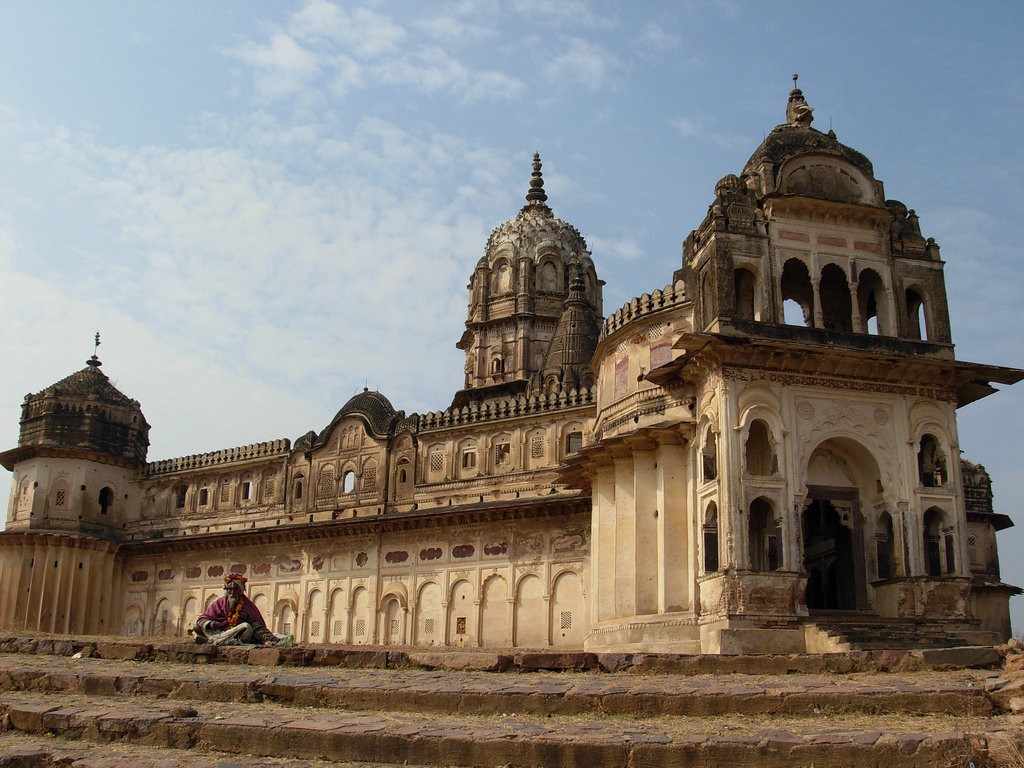
Lakshmi Temple, dedicated to Lakshmi

Chaturbhuj and Lakshmi temples, located in Orchha, were built by Hindu Rajput Orchha State, who were vassal of the Mughal Empire.

The official state religion of Mughal India was Islam, with the preference to the jurisprudence of the Hanafi Madhhab (Mazhab). Hinduism remained under strain during Babur and Humanyun's reigns. Sher Shah Suri, the Afghan ruler of North India was comparatively non-repressive. Hinduism came to fore during the three-year rule of Hindu ruler Hemu Vikramaditya during 1553–1556 when he had defeated Akbar at Agra and Delhi and had taken up the reign from Delhi as a Hindu 'Vikramaditya' after his 'Rajyabhishake' or coronation at Purana Quila in Delhi. However, during Mughal history, at times, subjects had the freedom to practise any religion of their choice, though kafir able-bodied adult males with income were obliged to pay the jizya, which signified their status as dhimmis.

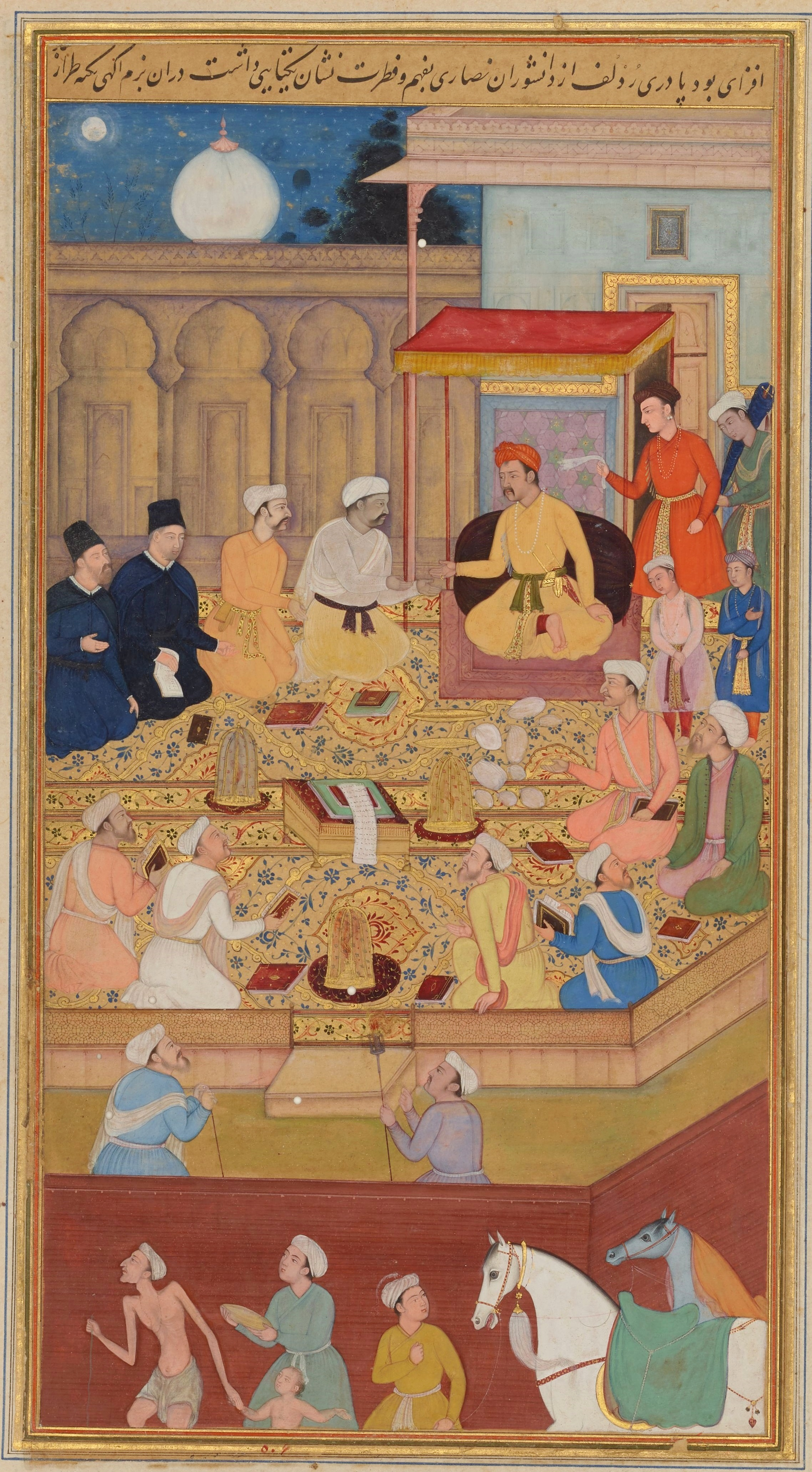
Akbar the Great holds a religious assembly of different faiths, including Hindus, in the Ibadat Khana in Fatehpur Sikri.

Akbar, the Mughal emperor Humayun's son and heir from his Sindhi queen Hameeda Banu Begum, had a broad vision of Indian and Islamic traditions. One of Emperor Akbar's most unusual ideas regarding religion was Din-i-Ilahi (Faith of God), which was an eclectic mix of Islam, Zoroastrianism, Hinduism, Jainism and Christianity. It was proclaimed the state religion until his death. These actions, however, met with stiff opposition from the Muslim clergy, especially the Sufi Shaykh Alf Sani Ahmad Sirhindi. Akbar's abolition of poll-tax on non-Muslims, acceptance of ideas from other religious philosophies, toleration of public worship by all religions and his interest in other faiths showed an attitude of considerable religious tolerance, which, in the minds of his orthodox Muslim opponents, were tantamount to apostasy. Akbar's imperial expansion acquired many Hindu states, many of whom were Hindu Rajputs, through vassalage. The Rajput vassals maintained semi-autonomy in running religious affairs. Many Hindu Rajput vassals built monumental Hindu temples during the period, such as Chaturbhuj Temple and Lakshmi Temple at Orchha, by the Mughal vassal, the Hindu Rajput Orchha State.

Akbar's son, Jahangir, half Rajput, was also a religious moderate, his mother being Hindu. The influence of his two Hindu queens (the Maharani Maanbai and Maharani Jagat) kept religious moderation as a centre-piece of state policy which was extended under his son, Emperor Shah Jahan, who was by blood 75% Rajput and less than 25% Moghul.

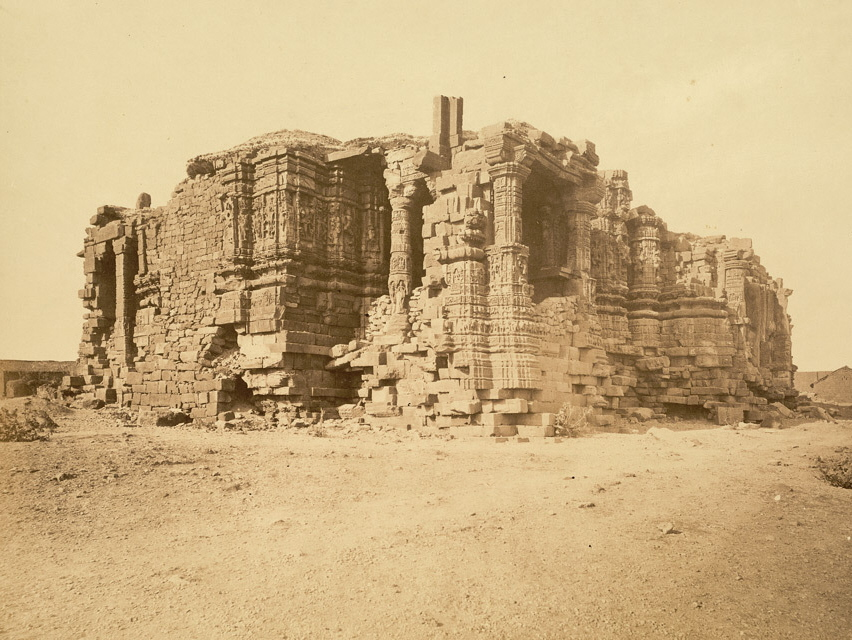
Somnath temple in ruins, 1869

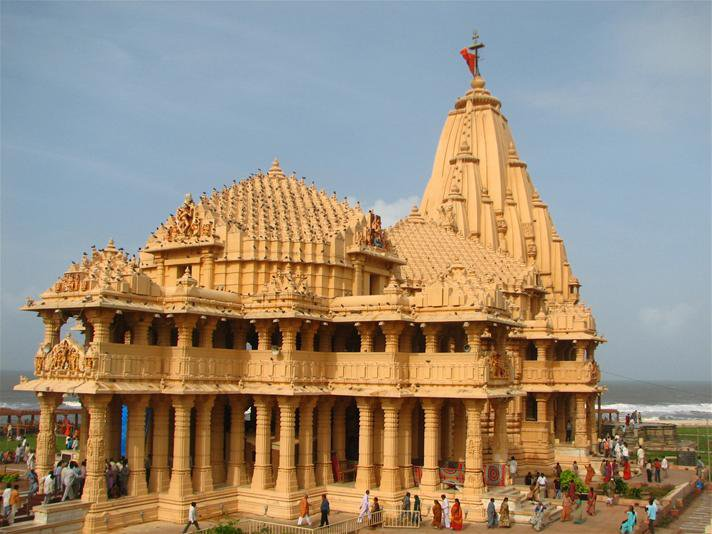
Front view of the present Somnath Temple

The Somnath temple was first attacked by Muslim Turkic invader Mahmud of Ghazni and repeatedly rebuilt after being demolished by successive Muslim rulers, including the Mughals under Aurangzeb.

Religious orthodoxy would only play an important role during the reign of Shah Jahan's son and successor, Aurangzeb, a devout Sunni Muslim. Aurangzeb was comparatively less tolerant of other faiths than his predecessors had been; and has been subject to controversy and criticism for his policies that abandoned his predecessors' legacy of pluralism, citing his introduction of the jizya tax, doubling of custom duties on Hindus while abolishing it for Muslims, destruction of Hindu temples, forbidding construction and repairs of some non-Muslim temples, and the executions of Maratha ruler Sambhaji and the ninth Sikh guru, Guru Tegh Bahadur, and his reign saw an increase in the number and importance of Islamic institutions and scholars. He led many military campaigns against the remaining non-Muslim powers of the Indian subcontinent – the Sikh states of Punjab, the last independent Hindu Rajputs and the Maratha rebels – as also against the Shia Muslim kingdoms of the Deccan. He also virtually stamped out, from his empire, open proselytisation of Hindus and Muslims by foreign Christian missionaries, who remained successfully active, however, in the adjoining regions (i.e regions outside of his dominion) namely: present day Kerala, Tamil Nadu and Goa. The Hindus in Konkan were helped by Marathas, Hindus in Punjab, Kashmir and North India were helped by Sikhs and Hindus in Rajasthan and Central India were helped by Rajputs.

==== Maratha Empire ====
The Hindu Marathas had resisted incursions into the region by the Muslim Mughal rulers of northern India. Under their ambitious leader Chhatrapati Shivaji Maharaj, the Maratha freed themselves from the Muslim sultans of Bijapur to the southeast and, becoming much more aggressive, began to frequently raid Mughal territory. The Marathas had spread and conquered much of central India by Shivaji's death in 1680. Subsequently, under the able leadership of Brahmin prime ministers (Peshwas), the Maratha Empire reached its zenith; Pune, the seat of Peshwas, flowered as a centre of Hindu learning and traditions. The empire at its peak stretched from Tamil Nadu in the south, to Peshawar, present day Khyber Pakhtunkhwa (Note: Many historians consider Attock to be the final frontier of the Maratha Empire.) in the north, and Bengal in the east.

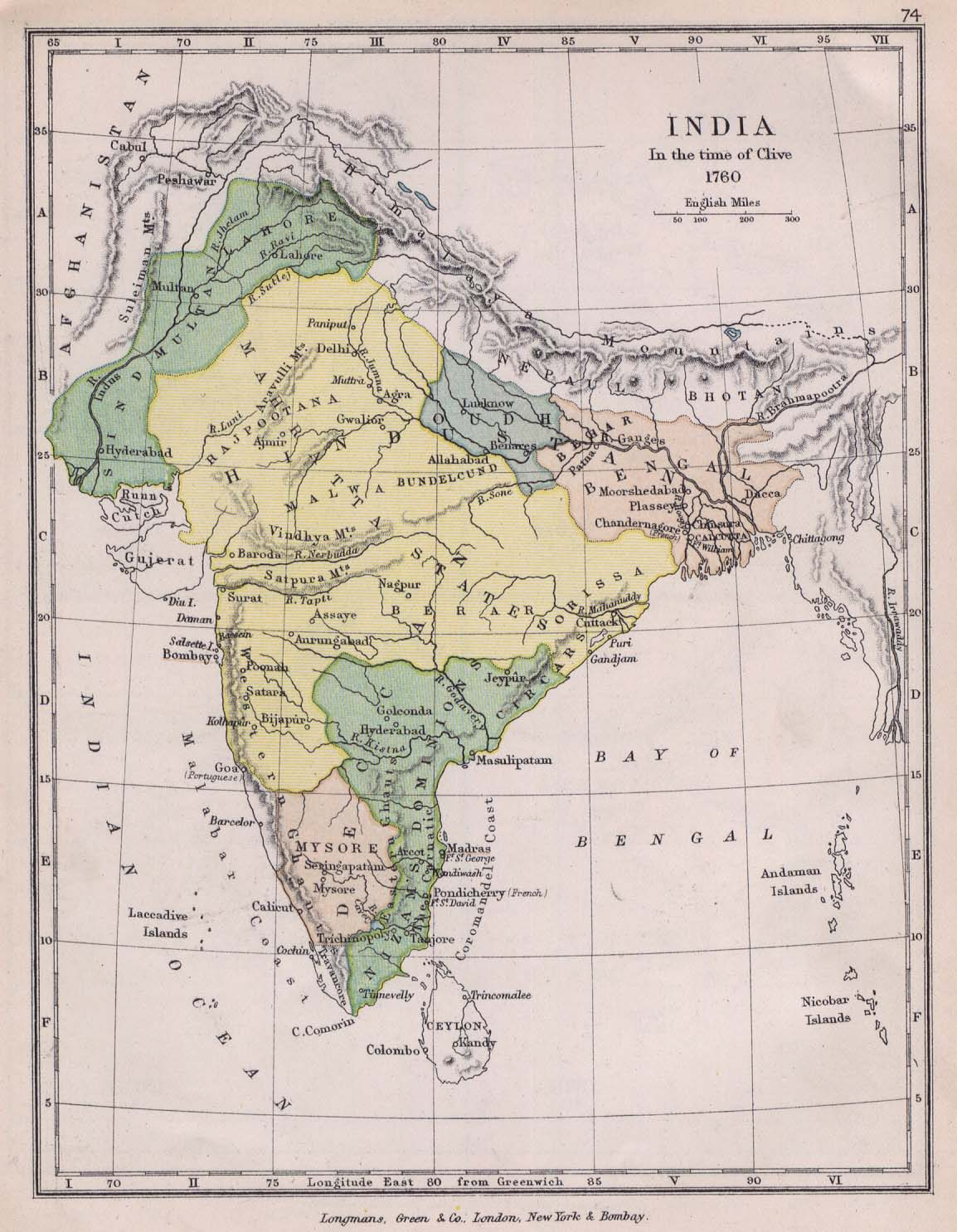
The last Hindu empire of India, the Maratha Empire, in 1760 CE

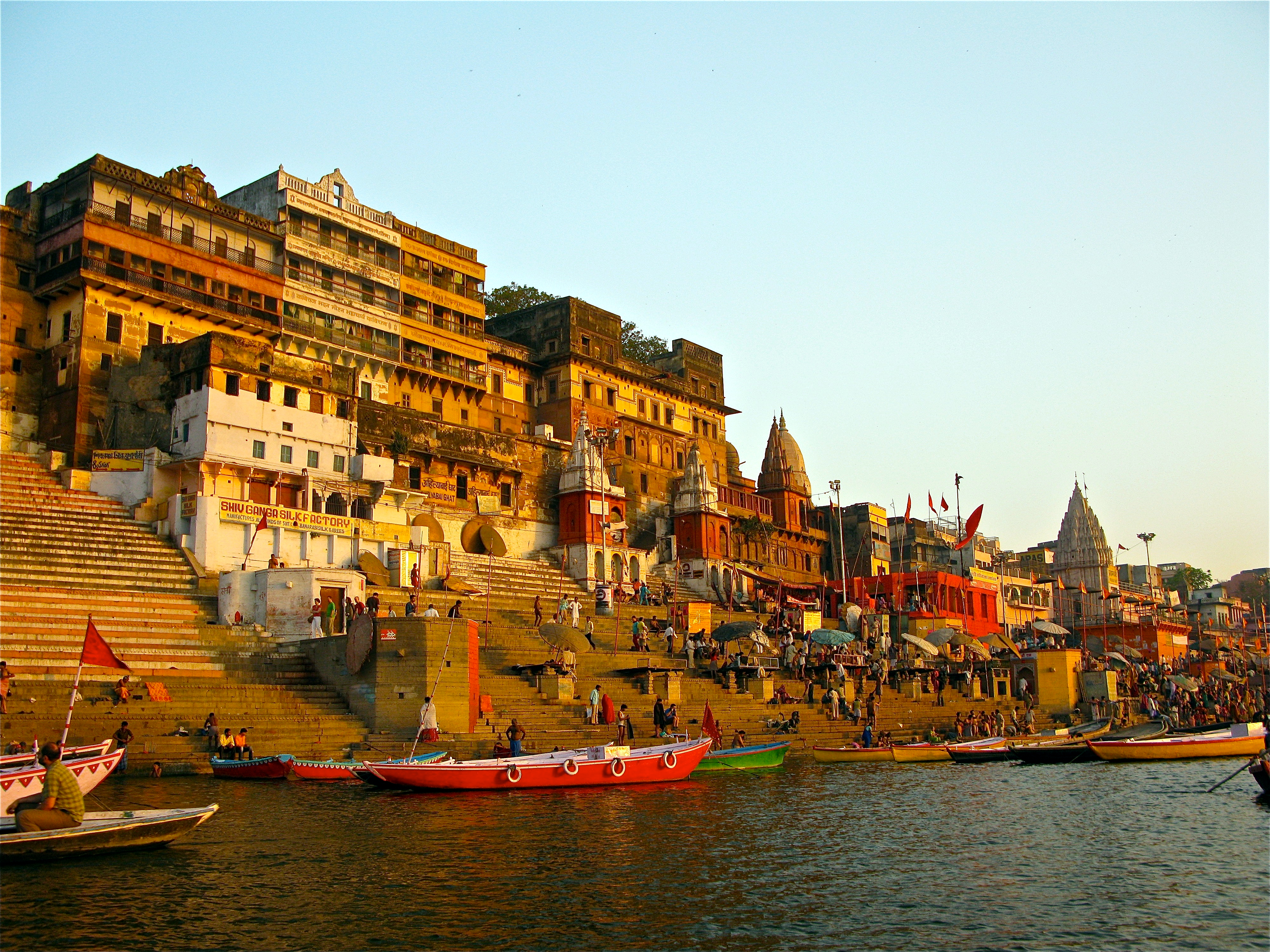
Ahilya Ghat, part of the Ghats in Varanasi, many of which were built by the Marathas

==== Kingdom of Nepal ====
King Prithvi Narayan Shah, the last Gorkhali monarch, self-proclaimed the newly unified Kingdom of Nepal as Asal Hindustan ("Real Land of Hindus") due to North India being ruled by the Islamic Mughal rulers. The proclamation was done to enforce Hindu social code Dharmaśāstra over his reign and refer to his country as being inhabitable for Hindus. He also referred Northern India as Mughlan (Country of Mughals) and called the region infiltrated by Muslim foreigners.

After the Gorkhali conquest of Kathmandu Valley, King Prithvi Narayan Shah expelled the Christian Capuchin missionaries from Patan and revisioned Nepal as Asal Hindustan ("real land of Hindus"). The Hindu Tagadharis, a Nepalese Hindu socio-religious group, were given the privileged status in the Nepalese capital thereafter. Since then Hinduisation became the significant policy of the Kingdom of Nepal. Professor Harka Gurung speculates that the presence of Islamic Mughal rule and Christian British rule in India had compelled the foundation of Brahmin Orthodoxy in Nepal for the purpose building a haven for Hindus in the Kingdom of Nepal.

==== Early colonialism ====
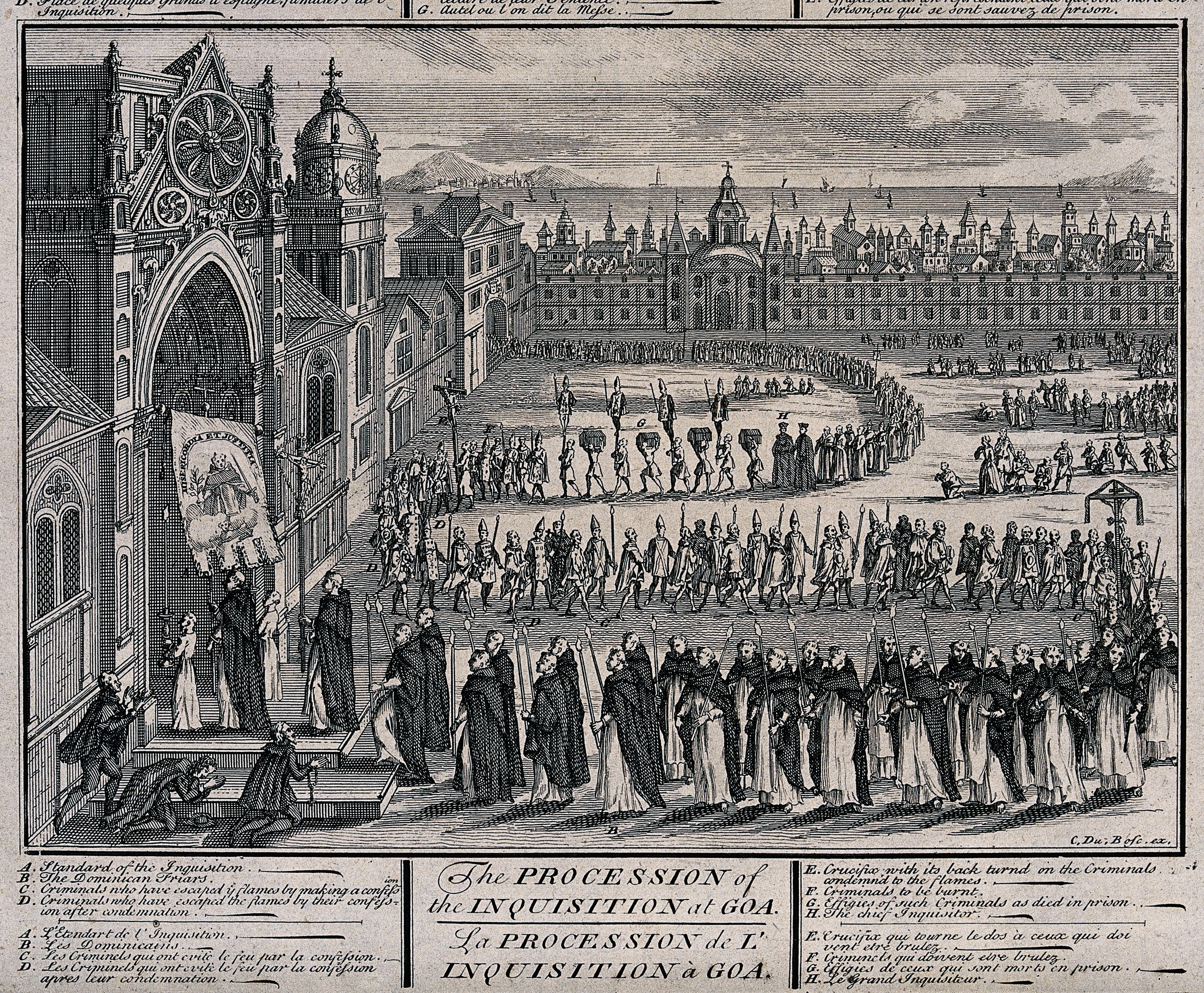
The Auto-da-fé procession of the Inquisition at Goa. An annual event to publicly humiliate and punish the heretics, it shows the Chief Inquisitor, Dominican friars, Portuguese soldiers, as well as religious criminals condemned to be burnt in the procession.

The Goa Inquisition was the office of the Christian Inquisition acting in the Indian city of Goa and the rest of the Portuguese empire in Asia. Francis Xavier, in a 1545 letter to John III, requested for an Inquisition to be installed in Goa. It was installed eight years after the death of Francis Xavier in 1552. Established in 1560 and operating until 1774, this highly controversial institution was aimed primarily at Hindus and wayward new converts.

The Battle of Plassey would see the emergence of the British as a political power; their rule later expanded to cover much of India over the next hundred years, conquering all of the Hindu states on the Indian subcontinent, with the exception of the Kingdom of Nepal. While the Maratha Empire remained the preeminent power in India, making it the last remaining Hindu empire, until their defeat in the Third Anglo-Maratha War which left the East India Company in control of most of India; as noted by acting Governor-General Charles Metcalfe, after surveying and analysing the conditions in India, in 1806 wrote: "India contains no more than two great powers, British and Mahratta." During this period, Northeastern India was divided into many kingdoms, most notable being the Kingdom of Manipur, which ruled from their seat of power at Kangla Palace and developed a sophisticated Hindu Gaudiya Vaishnavism culture, later the kingdom became a princely state of the British. The Kingdom of Mysore was defeated in the Fourth Anglo-Mysore War by the British East India Company, leading to the reinstatement of the Hindu Wadiyar dynasty in Mysore as a princely states. In 1817, the British went to war with the Pindaris, raiders who were based in Maratha territory, which quickly became the Third Anglo-Maratha War, and the British government offered its protection to the mainly Hindu Rajput rulers of Rajputana from the Pindaris and the Marathas. The mainly Hindu Palaiyakkarar states emerged from the fall of the Vijayanagara Empire, and were a bastion of Hindu resistance; and managed to weather invasions and survive till the advent of the British. From 1799 to 1849, the Sikh Empire, ruled by members of the Sikh religion, emerged as the last major indigenous power in the Northwest of the Indian subcontinent under the leadership of Maharaja Ranjit Singh. After the death of Ranjit Singh, the empire weakened, alienating Hindu vassals and Wazirs, and leading to the conflict with the British East India Company, marked the downfall of the Sikh Empire, making it the last area of the Indian subcontinent to be conquered by the British. The entire subcontinent fell under British rule (partly indirectly, via princely states) following the Indian Rebellion of 1857.

== Modern Hinduism (after c. 1850 CE) ==
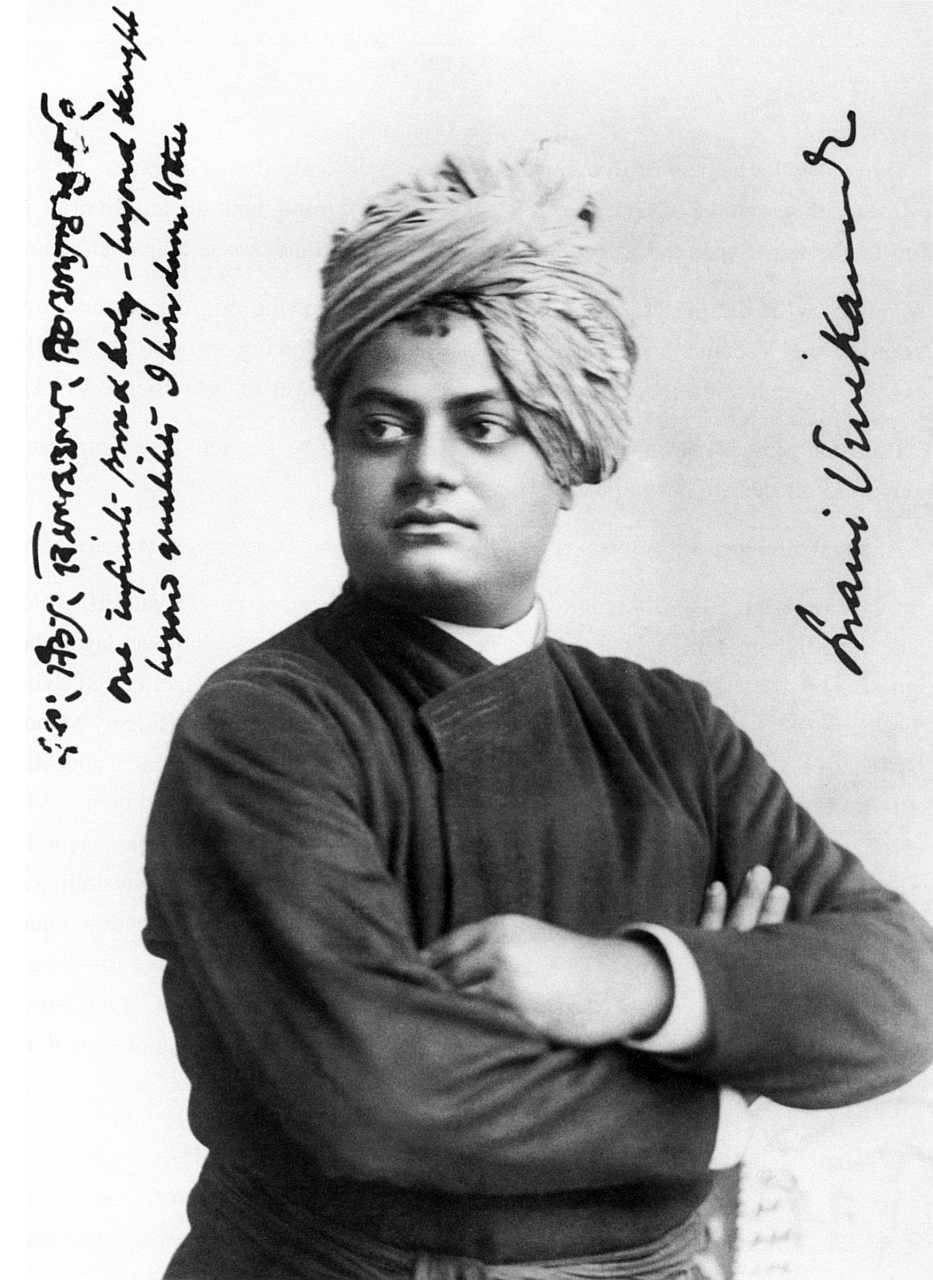
Swami Vivekananda was a key figure in introducing Vedanta and Yoga in the Western world, raising interfaith awareness and making Hinduism a world religion.

With the onset of the British Raj, the colonisation of India by the British, there also started a Hindu Renaissance in the 19th century, which profoundly changed the understanding of Hinduism in both India and the west. Indology as an academic discipline of studying Indian culture from a European perspective was established in the 19th century, led by scholars such as Max Müller and John Woodroffe. They brought Vedic, Puranic and Tantric literature and philosophy to Europe and the United States. Western orientalist searched for the "essence" of the Indian religions, discerning this in the Vedas, and meanwhile creating the notion of "Hinduism" as a unified body of religious praxis and the popular picture of 'mystical India'. This idea of a Vedic essence was taken over by Hindu reform movements as the Brahmo Samaj, which was supported for a while by the Unitarian Church, together with the ideas of Universalism and Perennialism, the idea that all religions share a common mystic ground. This "Hindu modernism", with proponents like Vivekananda, Aurobindo, Rabindranath and Radhakrishnan, became central in the popular understanding of Hinduism.

=== Hindu revivalism ===
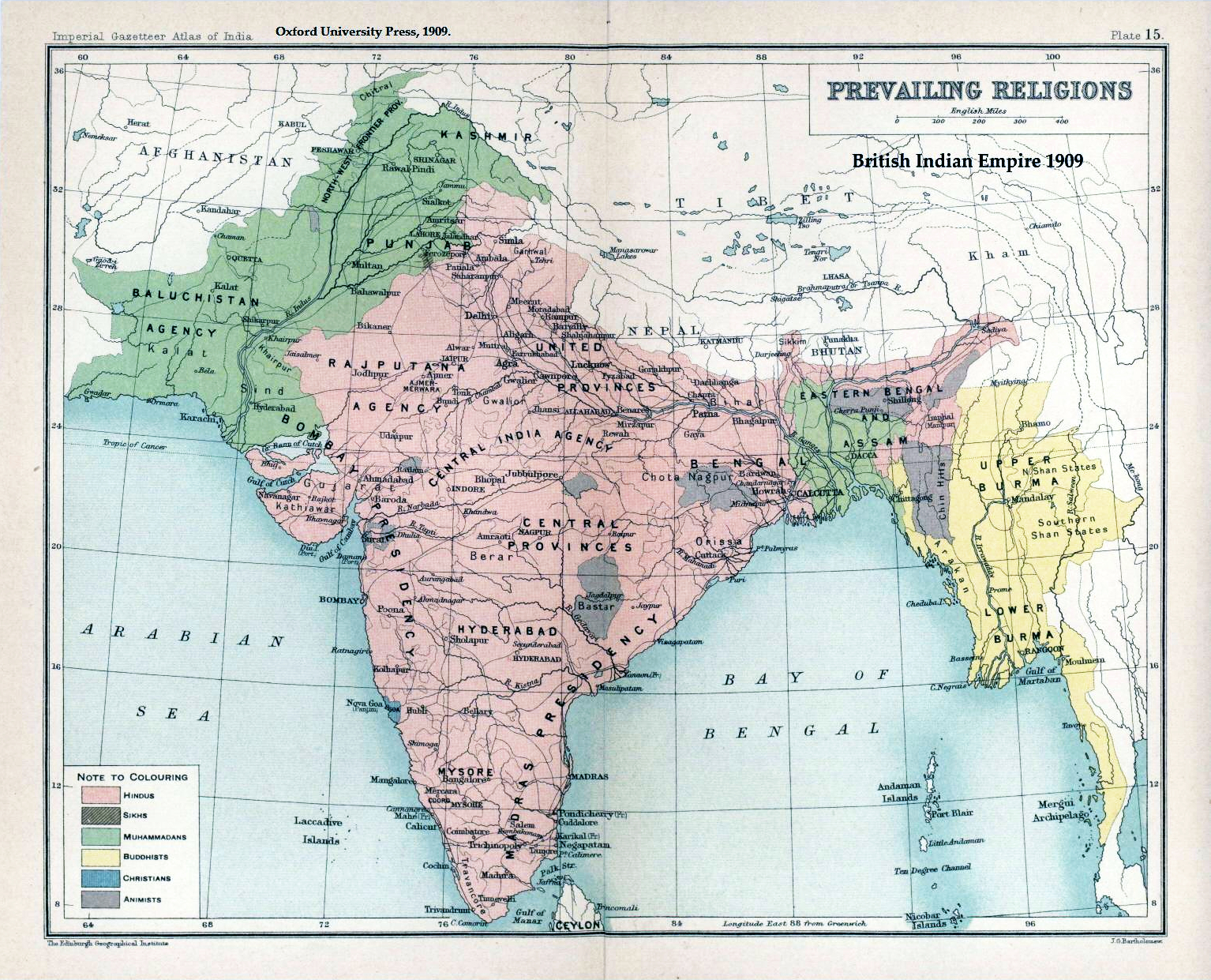
1909 Prevailing Religions, map of British Indian Empire, 1909, showing the prevailing majority religions of the population for different districts

During the 19th century, Hinduism developed a large number of new religious movements, partly inspired by the European Romanticism, nationalism, scientific racism and esotericism (Theosophy) popular at the time (while conversely and contemporaneously, India had a similar effect on European culture with Orientalism, "Hindoo style" architecture, reception of Buddhism in the West and similar). According to Paul Hacker, "the ethical values of Neo-Hinduism stem from Western philosophy and Christianity, although they are expressed in Hindu terms".

These reform movements are summarised under Hindu revivalism and continue into the present.

- Swaminarayan establishes the Swaminarayan Sampradaya sect around 1800.
- Brahmo Samaj is a social and religious movement founded in Kolkata in 1828 by Raja Ram Mohan Roy. He was one of the first Indians to visit Europe and was influenced by western thought. He died in Bristol, England. The Brahmo Samaj movement thereafter resulted in the Brahmo religion in 1850 founded by Debendranath Tagore — better known as the father of Rabindranath Tagore.
- Ramakrishna and his pupil Swami Vivekananda led reform in Hinduism in the late 19th century. Their ideals and sayings have inspired numerous Indians as well as non-Indians, Hindus as well as non-Hindus.
- Arya Samaj ("Society of Nobles") is a Hindu reform movement in India that was founded by Swami Dayananda in 1875. He was a sannyasin (renouncer) who believed in the infallible authority of the Vedas. Dayananda advocated the doctrine of karma and reincarnation, and emphasised the ideals of brahmacharya (chastity) and sanyasa (renunciation). Dayananda claimed to be rejecting all non-Vedic beliefs altogether. Hence the Arya Samaj unequivocally condemned idolatry, animal sacrifices, ancestor worship, pilgrimages, priestcraft, offerings made in temples, the caste system, untouchability and child marriages, on the grounds that all these lacked Vedic sanction. It aimed to be a universal church based on the authority of the Vedas. Dayananda stated that he wanted 'to make the whole world Aryan', i.e. he wanted to develop missionary Hinduism based on the universality of the Vedas. To this end, the Arya Samaj started Shuddhi movement in the early 20th century to bring back to Hinduism people converted to Islam and Christianity, set up schools and missionary organisations, and extended its activities outside India.

=== Reception in the West ===
An important development during the British colonial period was the influence Hindu traditions began to form on Western thought and new religious movements. An early champion of Indian-inspired thought in the West was Arthur Schopenhauer who in the 1850s advocated ethics based on an "Aryan-Vedic theme of spiritual self-conquest", as opposed to the ignorant drive toward earthly utopianism of the superficially this-worldly "Jewish" spirit. Helena Blavatsky moved to India in 1879, and her Theosophical Society, founded in New York in 1875, evolved into a peculiar mixture of Western occultism and Hindu mysticism over the last years of her life.

The sojourn of Swami Vivekananda to the World Parliament of Religions in Chicago in 1893 had a lasting effect. Vivekananda founded the Ramakrishna Mission, a Hindu missionary organisation still active today.

In the early 20th century, Western occultists influenced by Hinduism include Maximiani Portaz – an advocate of "Aryan Paganism" – who styled herself Savitri Devi and Jakob Wilhelm Hauer, founder of the German Faith Movement. It was in this period, and until the 1920s, that the swastika became a ubiquitous symbol of good luck in the West before its association with the Nazi Party became dominant in the 1930s.

Hinduism-inspired elements in Theosophy were also inherited by the spin-off movements of Ariosophy and Anthroposophy and ultimately contributed to the renewed New Age boom of the 1960s to 1980s, the term New Age itself deriving from Blavatsky's 1888 The Secret Doctrine.

Influential 20th-century Hindus were Ramana Maharshi, B. K. S. Iyengar, Paramahansa Yogananda, Prabhupada (founder of ISKCON), Sri Chinmoy, Swami Rama and others who translated, reformulated and presented Hinduism's foundational texts for contemporary audiences in new iterations, raising the profiles of Yoga and Vedanta in the West and attracting followers and attention in India and abroad.

== Contemporary Hinduism ==
Hinduism is followed by around 1.1 billion people in India. Other significant populations are found in Nepal (21.5 million), Bangladesh (13.1 million), and the Indonesian island of Bali (3.9 million). The majority of the Vietnamese Cham people also follow Hinduism, with the largest proportion in Ninh Thuận province.

=== Neo-Hindu movements in the West ===
In modern times Smarta-views have been highly influential in both the Indian and western understanding of Hinduism via Neo-Vedanta. Vivekananda was an advocate of Smarta-views, and Radhakrishnan was himself a Smarta-Brahman. According to iskcon.org,

Many Hindus may not strictly identify themselves as Smartas but, by adhering to Advaita Vedanta as a foundation for non-sectarianism, are indirect followers.

Influential in spreading Hinduism to a western audience were Swami Vivekananda, Paramahansa Yogananda, A. C. Bhaktivedanta Swami Prabhupada (Hare Krishna movement), Sri Aurobindo, Meher Baba, Maharishi Mahesh Yogi (Transcendental Meditation), Jiddu Krishnamurti, Sathya Sai Baba, Mother Meera, among others.

=== Hindutva ===
In the 20th century, Hinduism also gained prominence as a political force and a source for national identity in India. With origins traced back to the establishment of the Hindu Mahasabha in the 1910s, the movement grew with the formulation and development of the Hindutva ideology in the following decades; the establishment of Rashtriya Swayamsevak Sangh (RSS) in 1925; and the entry, and later success, of RSS offshoots Jana Sangha and Bharatiya Janata Party (BJP) in electoral politics in post-independence India. Hindu religiosity plays an important role in the nationalist movement. (Note: This conjunction of nationalism and religion is not unique to India. The complexities of Asian nationalism are to be seen and understood in the context of colonialism, modernisation and nation-building. See, for example, Anagarika Dharmapala, for the role of Theravada Buddhism in Sri Lankese struggle for independence (McMahan 2008), and D. T. Suzuki, who conjuncted Zen to Japanese nationalism and militarism, in defence against both western hegemony and the pressure on Japanese Zen during the Meiji Restoration to conform to Shinbutsu Bunri (Sharf 1993, Sharf 1995).) (Note: Rinehart (2004, p. 198): Neo-Vedanta also contributed to Hindutva ideology, Hindu politics and communalism. Yet, Rinehart emphasises that it is "clear that there isn't a neat line of causation that leads from the philosophies of Rammohan Roy, Vivekananda and Radhakrishnan to the agenda of ... militant Hindus.")

Besides India, the idea of Hindu nationalism and Hindutva can also be seen in the other areas with good population of Hindus, such as in Nepal, Bangladesh, Sri Lanka and Malaysia. In the modern world, the Hindu identity and nationalism is encouraged by many organisations as per their areas and territories. In India, Sangh Parivar is the umbrella organisation for most of the Hindu nationalist organisations, including that of Rashtriya Swayamsevak Sangh, Bharatiya Janata Party, Vishva Hindu Parishad, etc. The other nationalist organisations include Siva Senai (Sri Lanka), Nepal Shivsena, Rastriya Prajatantra Party, Hindu Prajatantrik Party, (Nepal) Bangabhumi (Bangladesh) and HINDRAF (Malaysia).

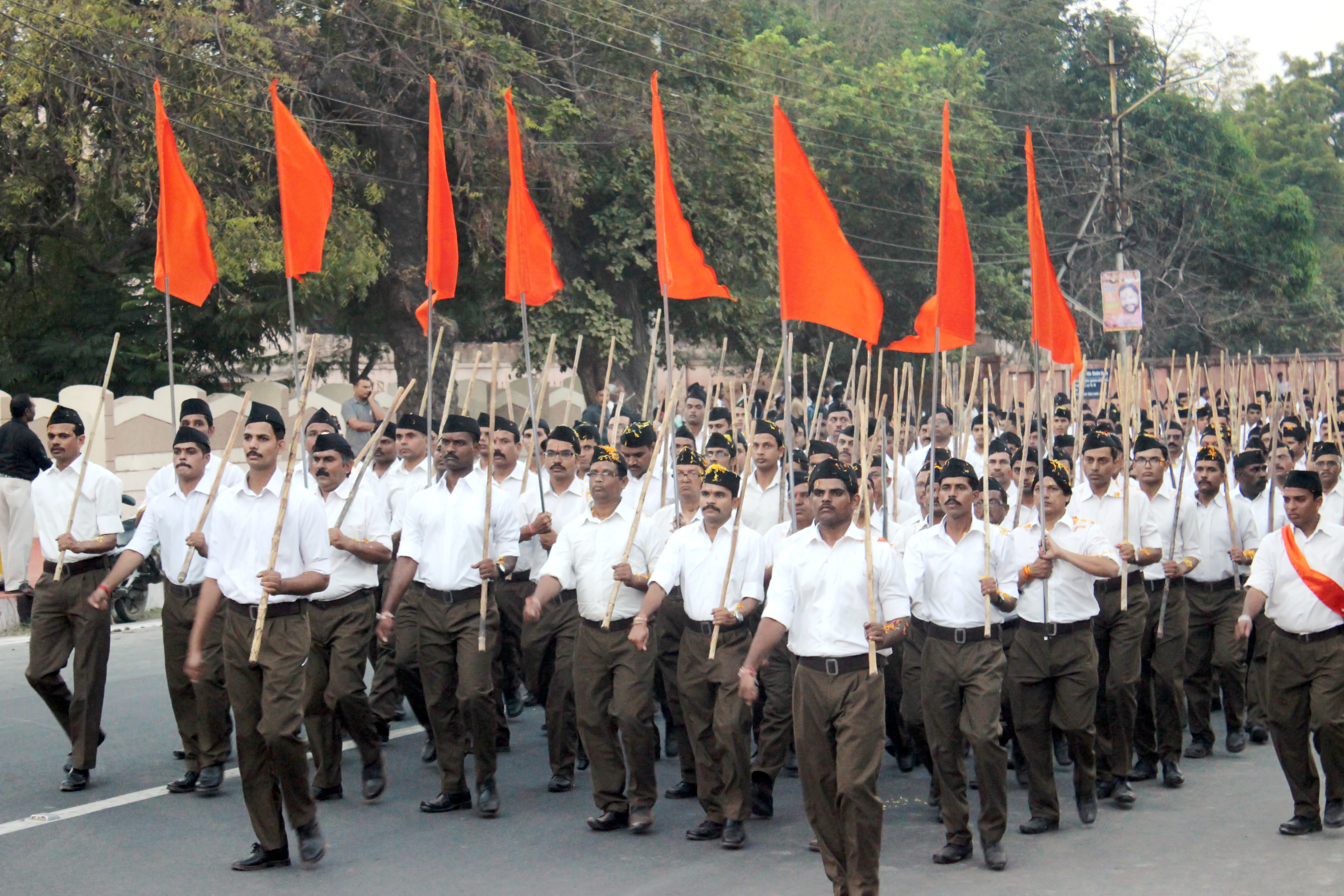
Rashtriya Swayamsevak Sangh in India

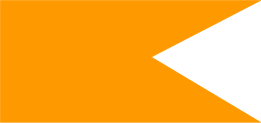
Saffron Flag of Hinduism in India

== See also ==
- Indianisation
  - Greater India
  - Indomania
  - Indosphere
  - Sanskritisation
  - List of Hindu empires and dynasties
  - India as major ancient great power
- Indianization of Southeast Asia
  - Indianized kingdom
  - History of Indian influence on Southeast Asia
    - South-East Asia campaign of Rajendra Chola I
    - Chola invasion of Srivijaya
    - Indian influences in early Philippine polities
- History of India
  - Indian religions
    - Hinduism (Vedic & Puranic)
    - Buddhism (Mahayana & Theravada)
    - Jainism (Digambara & Svetambara)
    - Sikhism (Nanakpanthi, Khalsa & Sahajdhari)
  - Religion in India
  - History of Yoga
  - History of Shaivism
  - History of Shaktism
  - Historical Vishnuism
  - Historicity of the Mahabharata

== Notes ==
Subnotes

== Sources ==
=== Printed sources ===
- Allchin, Frank Raymond; Erdosy, George (1995), The Archaeology of Early Historic South Asia: The Emergence of Cities and States, Cambridge University Press, ISBN 978-0-521-37695-2
- Anthony, David W. (2007), The Horse The Wheel And Language. How Bronze-Age Riders From the Eurasian Steppes Shaped The Modern World, Princeton University Press
- Ayalon, David (1986), Studies in Islamic History and Civilisation, BRILL, ISBN 978-965-264-014-7
- Ayyappapanicker, ed. (1997), Medieval Indian Literature:An Anthology, Sahitya Akademi, ISBN 81-260-0365-0
- Basham, Arthur Llewellyn (1967), The Wonder That was India
- Basham, Arthur Llewellyn (1989), The Origins and Development of Classical Hinduism, Oxford University Press, ISBN 978-0-19-507349-2, archived from the original on 23 December 2023
- Basham, Arthur Llewellyn (1999), A Cultural History of India, Oxford University Press, ISBN 978-0-19-563921-6
- Beckwith, Christopher I. (2009), Empires of the Silk Road, Princeton University Press, ISBN 978-0-691-13589-2
- Belvakar, S. K.; Ranade, R. D. (1974) [1927], History of Indian philosophy
- Bhattacharya, Ramkrishna (2011). Studies on the Carvaka/Lokayata. Anthem Press. ISBN 978-0-85728-433-4.
- Black, Jeremy (2006). A Military History of Britain: from 1775 to the Present. Westport, Conn.: Greenwood Publishing Group. ISBN 978-0-275-99039-8. Archived from the original on 23 December 2023.
- Blake Michael, R. (1992), The Origins of Vīraśaiva Sects, Motilal Banarsidass, ISBN 978-81-208-0776-1
- Brodd, Jeffrey (2003), World Religions, Winona, MN: Saint Mary's Press, ISBN 978-0-88489-725-5
- Bronkhorst, Johannes (2007), Greater Magadha: Studies in the Culture of Early India, BRILL, ISBN 9789004157194
- Bronkhorst, Johannes (2011). Buddhism in the Shadow of Brahmanism. BRILL.
- Bronkhorst, Johannes (2015), "The historiography of Brahmanism", in Otto; Rau; Rupke (eds.), History and Religion:Narrating a Religious Past, Walter deGruyter
- Bronkhorst, Johannes (2016), How the Brahmains Won, BRILL, archived from the original on 29 December 2020
- Bronkhorst, Johannes (2017), "Brahmanism: Its place in ancient Indian society", Contributions to Indian Sociology, 51 (3): 361–369, doi:10.1177/0069966717717587, S2CID 220050987, archived from the original on 23 December 2023
- Bryant, Edwin (2007), Krishna: A Sourcebook, Oxford University Press, ISBN 978-0-19-514892-3
- Burley, Mikel (2007), Classical Samkhya and Yoga: An Indian Metaphysics of Experience, Taylor & Francis
- Chatterjee, Indrani; Eaton, Richard M., eds. (2006), Slavery and South Asian History, Indiana University Press, ISBN 978-0-253-34810-4
- Clarke, Peter Bernard (2006), New Religions in Global Perspective, Routledge, ISBN 978-0-7007-1185-7
- Cœdès, George (1968). The Indianized States of Southeast Asia. Translated by Susan Brown Cowing. Honolulu: University of Hawaii Press. ISBN 978-0-8248-0368-1.
- Comans, Michael (2000), The Method of Early Advaita Vedānta: A Study of Gauḍapāda, Śaṅkara, Sureśvara, and Padmapāda, Delhi: Motilal Banarsidass
- Cousins, L.S. (2010), "Buddhism", The Penguin Handbook of the World's Living Religions, Penguin, ISBN 978-0-14-195504-9, archived from the original on 23 December 2023
- Crangle, Edward Fitzpatrick (1994), The Origin and Development of Early Indian Contemplative Practices, Otto Harrassowitz Verlag
- Deutsch, Eliot; Dalvi, Rohit (2004), The essential Vedanta. A New Source Book of Advaita Vedanta, World Wisdom
- Ragini Devi (1990). Dance Dialects of India. Motilal Banarsidass. ISBN 978-81-208-0674-0.
- Doniger, Wendy (2010), The Hindus: An Alternative History, Oxford University Press, ISBN 978-0-19-959334-7, archived from the original on 23 December 2023
- Duchesne-Guillemin, Jacques (Summer 1963), "Heraclitus and Iran", History of Religions, 3 (1): 34–49, doi:10.1086/462470, S2CID 62860085
- Eaton, Richard M. (2000). "Temple Desecration and Indo-Muslim States". Journal of Islamic Studies. 11 (3): 283–319. doi:10.1093/jis/11.3.283.
- Eaton, Richard M. Introduction. In Chatterjee & Eaton (2006).
- Embree, Ainslie T. (1988), Sources of Indian Tradition. Volume One. From the beginning to 1800 (2nd ed.), Columbia University Press, ISBN 978-0-231-06651-8, archived from the original on 23 December 2023
- Flood, Gavin D. (1996), An Introduction to Hinduism, Cambridge University Press, ISBN 978-0-521-43878-0, archived from the original on 23 December 2023
- Flood, Gavin (2008), The Blackwell Companion to Hinduism, John Wiley & Sons
- Fort, Andrew O. (1998), Jivanmukti in Transformation: Embodied Liberation in Advaita and Neo-Vedanta, SUNY Press
- Fowler, Jeaneane D. (1997), Hinduism: Beliefs and Practices, Sussex Academic Press
- Fritz, John M.; Michell, George, eds. (2001), New Light on Hampi: Recent Research at Vijayanagara, Marg, ISBN 978-81-85026-53-4
- Fuller, C. J. (2004), The Camphor Flame: Popular Hinduism and Society in India, Princeton, NJ: Princeton University Press, ISBN 978-0-691-12048-5
- Gaborieau, Marc (June 1985), "From Al-Beruni to Jinnah: Idiom, Ritual and Ideology of the Hindu-Muslim Confrontation in South Asia", Anthropology Today, 1 (3): 7–14, doi:10.2307/3033123, JSTOR 3033123
- Gellman, Marc; Hartman, Thomas (2011), Religion For Dummies, John Wiley & Sons
- Ghurye, Govind Sadashiv (1980), The Scheduled Tribes of India, Transaction Publishers, ISBN 978-1-4128-3885-6, archived from the original on 23 December 2023
- Gombrich, Richard F. (1996), Theravāda Buddhism. A Social History from Ancient Benares to Modern Colombo, London: Routledge, ISBN 978-0-415-07585-5
- Gombrich, Richard F. (2006), Theravada Buddhism. A Social History from Ancient Benares to Modern Colombo (Second ed.), London and New York: Routledge, ISBN 978-1-134-21718-2
- Gomez, Luis O. (2013), Buddhism in India. In: Joseph Kitagawa, "The Religious Traditions of Asia: Religion, History, and Culture", Routledge, ISBN 978-1-136-87590-8, archived from the original on 3 July 2023
- Hacker, Paul (1995), Philology and Confrontation: Paul Hacker on Traditional and Modern Vedanta, SUNY Press, ISBN 978-0-7914-2582-4
- Halbfass, Wilhelm (1991), Tradition and Reflection, SUNY Press, ISBN 978-0-7914-0361-7, archived from the original on 23 December 2023
- Heesterman, Jan (2005), "Vedism and Brahmanism", in Jones, Lindsay (ed.), The Encyclopedia of Religion, vol. 14 (2nd ed.), Macmillan Reference, pp. 9552–9553, ISBN 0-02-865733-0
- Hiltebeitel, Alf (2002), Hinduism. In: Joseph Kitagawa, "The Religious Traditions of Asia: Religion, History, and Culture", Routledge, ISBN 978-1-136-87597-7, archived from the original on 11 January 2023
- Hiltebeitel, Alf (2007), Hinduism. In: Joseph Kitagawa, "The Religious Traditions of Asia: Religion, History, and Culture". Digital printing 2007, Routledge, ISBN 978-1-136-87590-8, archived from the original on 3 July 2023
- Holdrege, Barbara A. (2004). "Dharma". In Mittal, S.; Thursby, G. (eds.). The Hindu World. New York: Routledge. pp. 213–248. ISBN 0-415-21527-7.
- Hopfe, Lewis M.; Woodward, Mark R. (2008), Religions of the World, Pearson Education, ISBN 978-0-13-606177-9, archived from the original on 23 December 2023
- Inden, Ronald (1998), "Ritual, Authority, And Cycle Time in Hindu Kingship", in J.F. Richards (ed.), Kingship and Authority in South Asia, New Delhi: Oxford University Press
- Iyer, Panchapakesa A.S. (2006). Karnataka Sangeeta Sastra. Chennai: Zion Printers.
- Jamison, Stephanie; Witzel, Michael (1992). "Vedic Hinduism" (PDF). Harvard University.
- Johnson, W.J. (2009), A Dictionary of Hinduism, Oxford University Press, ISBN 978-0-19-861025-0
- Jones, Constance; Ryan, James D. (2006), Encyclopedia of Hinduism, Infobase Publishing, ISBN 978-0-8160-7564-5, archived from the original on 3 July 2023
- Jones, Constance; Ryan, James D. (2008), Encyclopedia of Hinduism, Fact on file, ISBN 978-0-8160-7336-8
- Jones, Victoria (2004). Wonders of the World Dot-to-Dot. New York: Sterling Publishing Co., Inc. ISBN 1-4027-1028-3.
- Jouhki, Jukka (2006), "Orientalism and India" (PDF), J@rgonia, ISBN 951-39-2554-4, ISSN 1459-305X, archived (PDF) from the original on 25 May 2017
- Kamath, Suryanath U. (2001) [1980], A concise history of Karnataka: from pre-historic times to the present, Bangalore: Jupiter books, LCCN 80905179, OCLC 7796041
- Khanna, Meenakshi (2007), Cultural History of Medieval India, Berghahn Books
- King, Richard (1999), "Orientalism and the Modern Myth of "Hinduism"", NUMEN, 46 (2): 146–185, doi:10.1163/1568527991517950, S2CID 45954597
- King, Richard (2001), Orientalism and Religion: Post-Colonial Theory, India and "The Mystic East", Taylor & Francis e-Library
- King, Richard (2002), Orientalism and Religion: Post-Colonial Theory, India and "The Mystic East", Routledge
- Klostermaier, Klaus K. (2007), A Survey of Hinduism: Third Edition, SUNY Press, ISBN 978-0-7914-7082-4, archived from the original on 23 December 2023
- Kramer, Kenneth (1986), World scriptures: an introduction to comparative religions, Paulist Press, ISBN 978-0-8091-2781-8, archived from the original on 23 December 2023 – via Google Books; via Internet Archive
- Kulke, Hermann; Rothermund, Dietmar (1998), High-resolution analysis of Y-chromosomal polymorphisms reveals signatures of population movements from central Asia and West Asia into India, Routledge, ISBN 978-0-415-15482-6, archived from the original on 23 December 2023
- Kulke, Hermann; Rothermund, Dietmar (2004), A History of India, Routledge, ISBN 978-0-415-32920-0, archived from the original on 23 December 2023
- Kuwayama, Shoshin (1976). "The Turki Śāhis and Relevant Brahmanical Sculptures in Afghanistan". East and West. 26 (3/4): 375–407. ISSN 0012-8376. JSTOR 29756318.
- Laderman, Gary (2003), Religion and American Cultures: An Encyclopedia of Traditions, Diversity, and Popular Expressions, ABC-CLIO, ISBN 978-1-57607-238-7
- Larson, Gerald (1995), India's Agony Over Religion, SUNY Press, ISBN 978-0-7914-2411-7, archived from the original on 11 January 2023
- Larson, Gerald James (2009), Hinduism. In: "World Religions in America: An Introduction", pp. 179-198, Westminster John Knox Press, ISBN 978-1-61164-047-2, archived from the original on 23 December 2023
- Lockard, Craig A. (2007), Societies, Networks, and Transitions. Volume I: to 1500, Cengage Learning, ISBN 978-0-618-38612-3, archived from the original on 3 July 2023
- Lorenzen, David N. (2006), Who Invented Hinduism: Essays on Religion in History, Yoda Press, ISBN 9788190227261, archived from the original on 23 December 2023
- Mallory, J.P. (1989), In Search of the Indo-Europeans: Language, Archaeology, and Myth, London: Thames & Hudson, p. 38f
- Marshall, John (1996) [1931], Mohenjo Daro and the Indus Civilisation (reprint ed.), Asian Educational Services, ISBN 9788120611795, archived from the original on 23 December 2023
- Reginald Massey (2004). India's Dances: Their History, Technique, and Repertoire. Abhinav Publications. ISBN 978-81-7017-434-9. Archived from the original on 23 December 2023.
- McMahan, David L. (2008), The Making of Buddhist Modernism, Oxford University Press, ISBN 978-0-19-518327-6
- McRae, John (2003), Seeing Through Zen. Encounter, Transformation, and Genealogy in Chinese Chan Buddhism, The University Press Group Ltd, ISBN 978-0-520-23798-8
- Mehta, Jaswant Lal (2005). Advanced Study in the History of Modern India 1707–1813. Sterling. ISBN 978-1-932705-54-6.
- Melton, Gordon J.; Baumann, Martin (2010), Religions of the World: A Comprehensive Encyclopedia of Beliefs and Practices, (6 volumes) (2nd ed.), ABC-CLIO, ISBN 978-1-59884-204-3, archived from the original on 23 December 2023
- Michaels, Axel (2004), Hinduism. Past and present, Princeton, New Jersey: Princeton University Press
- Michell, George (1977), The Hindu Temple: An Introduction to Its Meaning and Forms, University of Chicago Press, ISBN 978-0-226-53230-1, archived from the original on 23 December 2023
- Michell, George (1995). Architecture and art of southern India: Vijayanagara and Successor states, Volume 1, Issue 6. Cambridge: Cambridge University Press. ISBN 0-521-44110-2.
- Minor, Rober Neil (1987), Radhakrishnan: A Religious Biography, SUNY Press
- Misra, Amalendu (2004), Identity and Religion: Foundations of Anti-Islamism in India, SAGE
- Mittal, Sushil; Thursby, G. R. (2005). The Hindu World. New York: Routelge. ISBN 0-203-67414-6. Archived from the original on 23 December 2023.
- Muesse, Mark William (2003), Great World Religions: Hinduism, archived from the original on 27 December 2013
- Muesse, Mark W. (2011), The Hindu Traditions: A Concise Introduction, Fortress Press
- Mukherjee, Namita; Nebel, Almut; Oppenheim, Ariella; Majumder, Partha P. (December 2001), "High-resolution analysis of Y-chromosomal polymorphisms reveals signatures of population movements from central Asia and West Asia into India", Journal of Genetics, 80 (3): 125–35, doi:10.1007/BF02717908, PMID 11988631, S2CID 13267463
- Nakamura, Hajime (2004) [1950], A History of Early Vedanta Philosophy. Part Two (reprint ed.), Delhi: Motilal Banarsidass Publishers
- Naravane, M.S. (2014), Battles of the Honorourable East India Company, A.P.H. Publishing Corporation, ISBN 9788131300343
- Narayanan, Vasudha (2009), Hinduism, The Rosen Publishing Group, ISBN 978-1-4358-5620-2, archived from the original on 3 July 2023
- Nath, Vijay (2001), "From 'Brahmanism' to 'Hinduism': Negotiating the Myth of the Great Tradition", Social Scientist, 29 (3/4): 19–50, doi:10.2307/3518337, JSTOR 3518337
- Neusner, Jacob (2009), World Religions in America: An Introduction, Westminster John Knox Press, ISBN 978-0-664-23320-4, archived from the original on 23 December 2023
- Nicholson, Andrew J. (2010), Unifying Hinduism: Philosophy and Identity in Indian Intellectual History, Columbia University Press, ISBN 978-0-231-52642-5
- Nilakanta Sastri, K. A. (1955) [reissued 2002]. A history of South India from prehistoric times to the fall of Vijayanagar. New Delhi: Indian Branch, Oxford University Press. ISBN 978-0-19-560686-7.
- Osborne, E (2005), Accessing R.E. Founders & Leaders, Buddhism, Hinduism and Sikhism Teacher's Book Mainstream, Folens Limited
- Pande, Govind Chandra, ed. (2006). India's Interaction with Southeast Asia. History of Science, Philosophy and Culture in Indian Civilization, vol. 1, part 3. Delhi: Centre for Studies in Civilizations. ISBN 9788187586241.
- Panikkar, Raimundo (2001). The Vedic Experience: Mantramañjari. Bangalore: Motilal Banarsidass. ISBN 81-208-1280-8.
- Radhakrishnan, S.; Moore, C. A. (1967), A Sourcebook in Indian Philosophy, Princeton University Press, ISBN 978-0-691-01958-1
- Raju, P. T. (1992), The Philosophical Traditions of India, Delhi: Motilal Banarsidass Publishers
- Renard, Philip (2010), Non-Dualisme. De directe bevrijdingsweg, Cothen: Uitgeverij Juwelenschip
- Rinehart, Robin (2004), Contemporary Hinduism: Ritual, Culture, and Practice, ABC-CLIO
- Roodurmum, Pulasth Soobah (2002), Bhāmatī and Vivaraṇa Schools of Advaita Vedānta: A Critical Approach, Delhi: Motilal Banarsidass Publishers Private Limited
- Rosen, Steven (2006), Essential Hinduism, Greenwood Publishing Group, ISBN 978-0-275-99006-0, archived from the original on 23 December 2023
- Samuel, Geoffrey (2010), The Origins of Yoga and Tantra. Indic Religions to the Thirteenth Century, Cambridge University Press
- Sarma, D. S. (1987) [1953], "The nature and history of Hinduism", in Morgan, Kenneth W. (ed.), The Religion of the Hindus, Ronald Press, pp. 3–47, ISBN 978-8120803879
- Scheepers, Alfred (2000). De Wortels van het Indiase Denken. Olive Press.
- Sharf, Robert H. (August 1993), "The Zen of Japanese Nationalism", History of Religions, 33 (1): 1–43, doi:10.1086/463354, S2CID 161535877, archived from the original on 29 December 2020
- Sharf, Robert H. (1995), Whose Zen? Zen Nationalism Revisited (PDF), archived (PDF) from the original on 2 February 2019
- Sharma, B. N. Krishnamurti (2000), History of the Dvaita School of Vedānta and Its Literature: From the Earliest Beginnings to Our Own Times, Motilal Banarsidass Publishers, ISBN 9788120815759, archived from the original on 23 December 2023
- Sharma, Chandradhar (1962). Indian Philosophy: A Critical Survey. New York: Barnes & Noble.
- Singh, Upinder (2008), A History of Ancient and Early Medieval India: From the Stone Age to the 12th Century, Pearson Education India, ISBN 978-81-317-1120-0
- Sjoberg, Andree F. (1990), "The Dravidian Contribution to the Development of Indian Civilization: A Call for a Reassessment", Comparative Civilizations Review, 23: 40–74, archived from the original on 4 March 2016
- Smart, Ninian (1964), Doctrine and argument in Indian Philosophy, George Allen and Unwin
- Smart, Ninian (1993), "THE FORMATION RATHER THAN THE ORIGIN OF A TRADITION", DISKUS, 1 (1): 1, archived from the original on 2 December 2013
- Smart, Ninian (2003), Godsdiensten van de wereld (The World's religions), Kampen: Uitgeverij Kok
- Srinivasan, Doris Meth (1997), Many Heads, Arms and Eyes: Origin, Meaning and Form in Multiplicity in Indian Art, Brill, ISBN 978-9004107588, archived from the original on 20 January 2023
- Stein, Burton (2010), A History of India, Second Edition (PDF), Wiley-Blackwell, archived from the original (PDF) on 14 January 2014
- Stevens, Anthony (2001), Ariadne's Clue: A Guide to the Symbols of Humankind, Princeton University Press
- Stoker, Valerie (2011). "Madhva (1238-1317)". Internet Encyclopedia of Philosophy. Archived from the original on 12 October 2016.
- Thapar, Romila (1978), Ancient Indian Social History: Some Interpretations (PDF), Orient Blackswan, archived (PDF) from the original on 14 February 2015
- Thapar, Romula (2003), The Penguin History of Early India: From the Origins to AD 1300, Penguin Books India, ISBN 978-0-14-302989-2, archived from the original on 23 December 2023
- Tiwari, Shiv Kumar (2002), Tribal Roots of Hinduism, Sarup & Sons
- Turner, Jeffrey S. (1996b), Encyclopedia of relationships across the lifespan, Greenwood Press
- van Buitenen, J.A.B. (2013). The Bhagavadgita in the Mahabharata. University of Chicago Press. ISBN 978-0-226-21902-8. Archived from the original on 23 December 2023.
- Vater, Tom (2010). Moon Spotlight Angkor Wat. USA: Perseus Books Group. ISBN 978-1-59880-561-1.
- Welbon, Guy (2004). "Hindu Beginnings. Assessing the Period 1000 BCE to 300 CE" (PDF). Education About Asia. 9 (2).
- Werner, Karel (2005), A Popular Dictionary of Hinduism, Routledge, ISBN 978-1-135-79753-9, archived from the original on 23 December 2023
- White, David Gordon (2000), Introduction. In: David Gordon White (ed.), "Tantra in Practice", Princeton University Press
- White, David Gordon (2003). Kiss of the Yogini. Chicago: University of Chicago Press. ISBN 0-226-89483-5.
- White, David Gordon (2006), Kiss of the Yogini: "Tantric Sex" in its South Asian Contexts, University of Chicago Press, ISBN 978-0-226-02783-8, archived from the original on 23 December 2023
- Williams, Drid (2004). "In the Shadow of Hollywood Orientalism: Authentic East Indian Dancing" (PDF). Visual Anthropology. 17 (1): 69–98. doi:10.1080/08949460490274013. S2CID 29065670. Archived from the original (PDF) on 4 March 2016.
- Wink, Andre (1991), Al-Hind: the Making of the Indo-Islamic World, Volume 1, Brill Academic, ISBN 978-9004095090
- Witzel, Michael (1995), "Early Sanskritization: Origin and Development of the Kuru state" (PDF), Electronic Journal of Vedic Studies, 1 (4): 1–26, archived from the original (PDF) on 11 June 2007
- Zimmer, Heinrich (1951), Philosophies of India, Princeton University Press
- Zimmer, Heinrich (1989), Philosophies of India (reprint ed.), Princeton University Press
