= Tarkshya =

Rigvedic character

Tārkṣya(Sanskrit: तार्क्ष्या) is the name of a mythical being in the Rigveda, described as a horse with the epithet áriṣṭa-nemi "with intact wheel-rims" (RV 1.89.6, RV 10.178.1), but alternatively taken to be a bird (RV 5.51) and later identified with Garuda (Mahabharata, Harivamsha) or Garuda's father (Bhagavata Purana 6.6.2, 21), counted among the offspring of Kashyapa in Mahabharata 1.2548, 4830 and 12468.

In the early Vedic texts (such as the Rigveda) tarkshya is described as a celestial horse or a magnificent bird representing the sun, symbolising swiftness, and heavenly power. In the later epic and Puranic literature, he evolved into the eagle-man hybrid deity Garuda. Tarkshya is frequently invoked in ancient Vedic hymns for protection against harm, safety during travel, prosperity, and longevity. As a divine bird, tarkshya is considered the natural enemy of snakes(nagas). He represents the protection against snakebites and toxic forces. In his identification with Garuda, his primary cosmological role is serving as a loyal vehicle carrying Vishnu across the universe.
