= Mitra (Hindu god) =

Vedic deity

- God of friendship, oaths and the morning sun
- Member of Adityas
- Devanagari: मित्र
- Sanskrit transliteration: mitrá
- Affiliation: Varuna, Deva, Adityas
- Abode: Devaloka
- Mantra: Om Mitraya Namah
- Weapon: Sword
- Mount: Horse

Genealogy
- Parents: Kashyapa (father); Aditi (mother)
- Consort: Revati
- Children: Vashishtha and Agastya (from Urvashi); Utsarga, Arishta and Pippala (from Revati)

Mitra (Sanskrit: मित्र IAST: Mitrá) is a Hindu god and generally one of the Adityas (the sons of the goddess Aditi), though his role has changed over time. In the Mitanni inscription, Mitra is invoked as one of the protectors of treaties. In the Rigveda, Mitra appears primarily in the dvandva compound Mitra-Varuna, which has essentially the same attributes as the god Varuna alone, e.g. as the principal guardian of ṛtá "Truth, Order". In the late Vedic texts and the Brahmanas, Mitra is increasingly associated with the light of dawn and the morning sun (while Varuna becomes associated with the evening, and ultimately the night). In the post-Vedic texts – in which Mitra practically disappears – Mitra evolved into the patron divinity of friendship, and because he is "friend", abhors all violence, even when sacred.

== Onomastics ==
The Indo-Iranian common noun *mitra means "(that which) causes [-tra] to bind [mi-]", hence Sanskrit mitram, "covenant, contract, oath", the protection of which is Mitra's role in both the Rigveda and in the Mitanni treaty. In post-Vedic India, the noun mitra came to be understood as "friend", one of the aspects of bonding and alliance. Accordingly, in post-Vedic India, Mitra became the guardian of friendships. In most Indian languages, the word mitr means 'friend'. The feminine form of the word in languages like Marathi or Hindi is maitrin or mitrā.

== In the Vedas ==
In the Rigveda, the oldest of the Vedic texts, Mitra is mostly indistinguishable from Varuna, together with whom Mitra forms a dvandva pair Mitra-Varuna, (Note: In Sanskrit dvandva compounds, the shorter name always appears first, regardless of seniority, hence 'Mitra-Varuna' even though Varuna is the more important of the two.) and in which Mitra-Varuna has essentially the same characteristics as Varuna alone. Varuna is not only the greater of the two, but also – according to RV 2.12 – the second-greatest of the RigVedic gods after Indra. Rigvedic hymns to Mitra-Varuna include RV 1.136, 137, 151–153, RV 5.62-72, RV 6.67, RV 7.60-66, RV 8.25 and RV 10.132. Mitra is addressed independently in one hymn only RV 3.59, where he has hardly any traits that distinguish him from Varuna, and owing to the scantiness of the information supplied in that hymn his separate character appears somewhat indefinite.

Mitra as an independent personage is insignificant. ... One theory holds that the dvandvic union possibly represents an apotropaic application [of "friend"] to the otherwise frightening and dangerous Varuna."

=== Combined descriptions ===
In Vedic tradition, Mitra-Varuna are described as monarchs and guardians of the world, whose palace is described with pillars and doors. They are associated with supporting heaven, earth, and the intervening air. They are identified as lords of rivers and seas, and are associated with sending rain and refreshment.

They wet the pastures with dew of clarified butter (ghee), and rain abounding in heavenly water comes from them. Their domain has streams that flow with honey, and their pastures have cattle that yield refreshment. They afflict those that disregard them with disease. They are asuras, and (like all asuras) wield their power through secret knowledge (māyā́), which empowers them to make the sun traverse the sky, and to obscure it with clouds. Their eye is the sun, and they mount their chariot in the highest heavens, which they drive with the rays of the sun as with arms. They have spies that are astute and undeceivable. They are maintainers of order (ṛtá, “truth”), they are barriers against falsehood, which they punish.

They once both emitted their semen into a pitcher at the sight of nymph Urvashi, from which the sages Vashishtha and Agastya emerged.

=== Asuras and devas ===
Although they are Asuras, Rigvedic Mitra-Varuna are also addressed as devas (e.g., RV 7.60.12). Mitra is also a deva (mitrasya...devasya, RV 3.59.6) in RV 3.59, which is the only Rigvedic hymn dedicated to Mitra independently from Mitra-Varuna. Despite the independent dedication, Mitra still retains much the same characteristics as Varuna in that hymn. Like Varuna, Mitra is lauded as a god following ṛta, order and stability and of observances (3.59.2b, vrata). Again like Varuna, Mitra is the sustainer of mankind (3.59.6a, said also of Indra in 3.37.4c) and of all gods (3.59.8c, devān vishvān). Elsewhere, when Mitra appears not paired with Varuna, it is often for the purpose of comparison, where other gods are lauded as being “like Mitra”, without the hymn being addressed to Mitra himself (Indra 1.129.10, 10.22.1–2 etc.; Agni 1.38.13 etc.; Soma 1.91.3; Vishnu 1.156.1). A characteristic unique to Mitra is his ability to marshal the people (yātayati, yātayáj-jana), an attribute that appears to be peculiarly his.

=== Distinct characteristics ===
In some of their aspects, Varuna is lord of the cosmic rhythm of the sun and other celestial spheres, while Mitra brings forth the light at dawn, which was covered by Varuna the previous evening. Mitra is also independently identified as being force by which the course of the sun is regulated (ṛta); Savitr (RV 1.35) is identified with Mitra because of those regulations, and Vishnu (RV 1.154) takes his three steps by those regulations. Agni is kindled before dawn to produce Mitra, and when kindled is Mitra.

In the Atharvaveda, Mitra is again associated with sunrise, and is contrasted with Varuna's association with the evening. In the Brahmanas, the exegetical commentaries on the Vedas, the associations with morning and evening lead Mitra to be connected with the day, and Varuna with night. Also in Shatapatha Brahmana, Mitra-Varuna is analyzed as "the Counsel and the Power" – Mitra being the priesthood (Purohita), and Varuna the royal power (Rājān).

== In Post-Vedic texts ==
Mitra appears in post-Vedic Hindu scriptures like the Ramayana, the Mahabharata, and the Puranas. However, his role becomes greatly diminished and little is said of him other than that he is a solar deity and an Aditya, (the sons of the goddess Aditi, fathered by the sage Kashyapa). According to Bhagavata Purana, Revati (lit. 'prosperity') is the name of Mitra's wife and the couple has three sons—Utsarga, Arishtha and Pippala.

The pairing of Mitra with Varuna is still present; a yajna dedicated to them by Vaivasvata Manu is mentioned in these scriptures. An instance of rivalry between Varuna and Mitra also occurs:

Both Mitra and Varuna became enamored of the celestial nymph Urvashi, and Varuna was moved to emit his seed into a sacred pitcher. This caused Mitra's seed to fall from her womb into the same sacred pitcher and he cursed her for lack of fidelity. From the mixed seed, the seers Vashishtha and Agastya were born, who are considered to be the sons of both Mitra and Varuna.

Other significant references to Mitra include the legend of Prithvi, where he acted as milkman of the gods to milk the cow-form of the earth goddess; his fight with Praheti in the Devasura war; and his worship by Pandava King Yudhishthira and Akrura.

== In inscriptions ==
Indic Mitra is first attested in a 14th century BCE Mitanni inscription in which an Indo-Aryan king of Mitanni invokes the gods Mitra, Indra, Varuna, and the Nasatyas as guarantors of his sworn obligations.

== In living tradition ==
In the Atharvaveda, Mitra is associated with sunrise, and accordingly, Mitra is worshipped in the sunrise prayers of the Hindus. The morning upasthaana prayer, recited to the risen sun after contemplation on the sacred Gayatri mantra, is a collection of Vedic verses addressing Mitra.

Mitra is co-worshipped in the Mitrotsavam Hindu festival of the Sun god Surya, whose orderly traversal of the sky is ensured by Mitra (e.g. RV 1.35) and Mitra-Varuna (e.g. RV 8.25.8).

Mitra is also worshiped in Bengal in the month of Agrahayan (November- December). Worship begins on Kartik Sankranti, the last day of the Bengali calendar month Kartik; and after worshiping the Mitra Dev (locally called Itu Thakur) for the full month, it is abducted into water on the day of Agrahayan Sankranti.

This puja is celebrated like a Vrata especially by women. On the first day, adherents bring a clay pot full of soil and plant many kind of seeds and plant roots in it. Every Sunday of the month they worship and sprinkle water on it. On the final day they abduct Itu Thakur in water before sunset.

== See also ==
- Hindu deities
- Mithra
- Mitra
- Mitra–Varuna
- Mithraism
- Rigvedic deities
