= Mandala 8 =

Eighth book of the Rigveda

The eighth Mandala of the Rigveda has 103 hymns. Other than the "family books" (Mandalas 2–7, dated as an old part of the RV) and RV 1 and RV 10 (dated as the latest portion of hymns composed shortly before redaction of the Rigveda into shakhas), Mandala 8 cannot straightforwardly be dated as a whole relative to the other books, and its hymns may include both ancient and late specimens. Most hymns in this book are attributed to the kāṇva family. The hymns 8.49 to 8.59 are the apocryphal vālakhilya, the majority of them are devoted to Indra; these are accepted as a recent portion, properly already post-Rigvedic.

The hymns are dedicated to Indra, Agni, the Asvins, the Maruts, the Adityas, Varuna, Mitra-Varuna, the Vishvadevas, and Soma. 8.100 is dedicated to Indra and Vak (Speech). Of the Valakhilya, six hymns are dedicated to Indra, and one each to the Asvins, the Vishvadevas and Indra-Varuna. 8.55 and 8.56 praise "Praskanva's Gift", the reward given to the rishi by Dasyave-vrka "the wolf of the Dasyus", a hero who in alliance with the Kanvas has won a victory over the Dasyus.

According to some scholars, the 8th Mandala has the most striking similarity to the Avesta: it contains allusions to Afghan flora and fauna, e.g. to camels (úṣṭra- = Avestan uštra (cf. Zaraθ-uštra; RV 8.4.7, 8.5.37, 8.46.22, 8.46.31; elsewhere in the RV only in 1.138.2). The river name Suvastu in 8.19.37 refers to the Swat River in Gandhari.

== List of incipits ==
The dedication as given by Griffith is in the square brackets.

8.1 (621) [Indra.] mâ cid anyád ví śaṃsata
8.2 (622) [Indra.] idáṃ vaso sutám ándhaḥ
8.3 (623) [Indra.] píbā sutásya rasíno
8.4 (624) [Indra.] yád indra prâg ápāg údaṅ
8.5 (625) [Asvins.] dūrâd ihéva yát satî
8.6 (626) [Indra.] mahâṁ índro yá ójasā
8.7 (627) [Maruts.] prá yád vas triṣṭúbham íṣam
8.8 (628) [Asvins.] â no víśvābhir ūtíbhir
8.9 (629) [Asvins.] â nūnám aśvinā yuváṃ
8.10 (630) [Asvins.] yát sthó dīrgháprasadmani
8.11 (631) [Agni.] tvám agne vratapâ asi
8.12 (632) [Indra.] yá indra somapâtamo
8.13 (633) [Indra.] índraḥ sutéṣu sómeṣu
8.14 (634) [Indra.] yád indrāháṃ yáthā tuvám
8.15 (635) [Indra.] tám u abhí prá gāyata
8.16 (636) [Indra.] prá samrâjaṃ carṣaṇīnâm
8.17 (637) [Indra.] â yāhi suṣumâ hí ta
8.18 (638) [Adityas.] idáṃ ha nūnám eṣ~āṃ
8.19 (639) [Agni.] táṃ gūrdhayā súvarṇaraṃ
8.20 (640) [Maruts.] â gantā mâ riṣaṇyata
8.21 (641) [Indra.] vayám u tvâm apūrviya
8.22 (642) [Asvins.] ~ó tyám ahva â rátham
8.23 (643) [Agni.] îḷiṣvā hí pratīvíyaṃ
8.24 (644) [Indra.] sákhāya â śiṣāmahi
8.25 (645) [Mitra-Varuna.] tâ vāṃ víśvasya gop~a
8.26 (646) [Asvins.] yuvór u ṣû ráthaṃ huve
8.27 (647) [Visvedevas.] agnír ukthé puróhito
8.28 (648) [Visvedevas.] yé triṃśáti tráyas paró
8.29 (649) [Visvedevas.] babhrúr éko víṣuṇaḥ sūnáro yúvā
8.30 (650) [Visvedevas.] nahí vo ásti arbhakó
8.31 (651) [Various Deities.] yó yájāti yájāta ít
8.32 (652) [Indra.] prá kṛtâni ṛjīṣíṇaḥ
8.33 (653) [Indra.] vayáṃ gha tvā sutâvanta
8.34 (654) [Indra.] â indra yāhi háribhir
8.35 (655) [Asvins.] agnínéndreṇa váruṇena víṣṇunā
8.36 (656) [Indra.] avitâsi sunvató vṛktábarhiṣaḥ
8.37 (657) [Indra.] prédám bráhma vṛtratûryeṣu āvitha
8.38 (658) [Indra-Angi.] yajñásya hí sthá ṛtvíjā
8.39 (659) [Agni.] agním astoṣi ṛgmíyam
8.40 (660) [Indra-Agni.] índrāgnī yuváṃ sú naḥ
8.41 (661) [Varuna.] asmâ ū ṣú prábhūtaye
8.42 (662) [Varuna.] ástabhnād dyâm ásuro viśvávedā
8.43 (663) [Agni.] imé víprasya vedháso
8.44 (664) [Agni.] samídhāgníṃ duvasyata
8.45 (665) [Indra.] â ghā yé agním indhaté
8.46 (666) [Indra.] tuvâvataḥ purūvaso
8.47 (667) [Adityas.] máhi vo mahatâm ávo
8.48 (668) [Soma.] svādór abhakṣi váyasaḥ sumedhâḥ
(vālakhilya)
8.60 (669) [Agni.] ágna â yāhi agníbhir
8.61 (670) [Indra.] ubháyaṃ śṛṇávac ca na
8.62 (671) [Indra.] prá ū asmā úpastutim
8.63 (672) [Indra.] sá pūrviyó mahân~āṃ
8.64 (673) [Indra.] út tvā mandantu stómāḥ
8.65 (674) [Indra.] yád indra prâg ápāg údaṅ
8.66 (675) [Indra.] tárobhir vo vidádvasum
8.67 (676) [Adityas.] tiyân nú kṣatríyāṁ áva
8.68 (677) [Indra.] â tvā ráthaṃ yáthotáye
8.69 (678) [Indra.] prá-pra vas triṣṭúbham íṣam
8.70 (679) [Indra.] yó râjā carṣaṇīn~âṃ
8.71 (680) [Agni.] tuváṃ no agne máhobhiḥ
8.72 (681) [Agni.] havíṣ kṛṇudhvam â gamad
8.73 (682) [Asvins.] úd īrāthām ṛtāyaté
8.74 (683) [Agni.] viśó-viśo vo átithiṃ
8.75 (684) [Agni.] yukṣvâ hí devahûtamāṁ
8.76 (685) [Indra.] imáṃ nú māyínaṃ huva
8.77 (686) [Indra.] jajñānó nú śatákratur
8.78 (687) [Indra.] puroḷâśaṃ no ándhasa
8.79 (688) [Soma.] ayáṃ kṛtnúr ágṛbhīto
8.80 (689) [Indra.] nahí anyám baḷâkaram
8.81 (690) [Indra.] â tû na indra kṣumántaṃ
8.82 (691) [Indra.] â prá drava parāváto
8.83 (692) [Visvedevas.] devânām íd ávo mahát
8.84 (693) [Agni.] práyiṣṭhaṃ vo átithiṃ
8.85 (694) [Asvins.] â me hávaṃ nāsatiyā
8.86 (695) [Asvins.] ubhâ hí dasrâ bhiṣájā mayobhúvā
8.87 (696) [Asvins.] dyumnî vāṃ stómo aśvinā
8.88 (697) [Indra.] táṃ vo dasmám ṛtīṣáhaṃ
8.89 (698) [Indra.] bṛhád índrāya gāyata
8.90 (699) [Indra.] â no víśvāsu háviya
8.91 (700) [Indra.] kaníyā vâr avāyatî
8.92 (701) [Indra.] p~ântam â vo ándhasa
8.93 (702) [Indra.] úd ghéd abhí śrutâmaghaṃ
8.94 (703) [Maruts.] gaúr dhayati marút~āṃ
8.95 (704) [Indra.] â tvā gíro rathîr iva
8.96 (705) [Indra.] asmâ uṣâsa âtiranta yâmam
8.97 (706) [Indra.] yâ indra bhúja âbharaḥ
8.98 (707) [Indra.] índrāya sâma gāyata
8.99 (708) [Indra.] tuvâm idâ hiyó náro
8.100 (709) [Indra. Vak.] ayáṃ ta emi tanúvā purástād
8.101 (710) [Various.] ŕdhag itthâ sá mártiyaḥ
8.102 (711) [Agni.] tuvám agne bṛhád váyo
8.103 (712) [Agni.] ádarśi gātuvíttamo

Vālakhilya:

8.49 (1018) [Indra.] abhí prá vaḥ surâdhasam
8.50 (1019) [Indra.] prá sú śrutáṃ surâdhasam
8.51 (1020) [Indra.] yáthā mánau sâṃvaraṇau
8.52 (1021) [Indra.] yáthā mánau vívasvati
8.53 (1022) [Indra.] upamáṃ tvā maghón~āṃ
8.54 (1023) [Indra.] etát ta indra vīríyaṃ
8.55 (1024) [Praskanva's Gift.] bhûrîd índrasya vīríyaṃ
8.56 (1025) [Praskanva's Gift.] práti te dasyave vṛka
8.57 (1026) [Asvins.] yuváṃ devā krátunā pūrviyéṇa
8.58 (1027) [Visvedevas.] yám ṛtvíjo bahudhâ kalpáyantaḥ
8.59 (1028) [Indra-Varuna.] imâni vām bhāgadhéyāni sisrata
