= Mitrotsavam =

Mitrotsavam (Mitrolsavam, Mitra Ulsavam) is a Hindu festival worshipping the Sun god Surya, whose orderly traversal of the sky is ensured by Mitra-Varuna, the guardians of cosmic order (ṛtá) in Rig Veda 8.25.8 and elsewhere.

On Mitrotsavam, devotees worship the Sun for prosperity, health and courage. Surya is glorified in Vedic mantras as the expeller of darkness and evil. The most sacred Gayatri mantra, composed by Sage Vishvamitra, worships the Sun as Savita. Additionally, the Sun is honored by recitation of the Aditya Hridayam— according to a legend in the Ramayana, Lord Rama was initiated into the worship of Surya with that hymn, which then gave him strength and the power to vanquish evil. Devotees also perform the Surya Namaskara, recite 108 names of Surya, and pray for help to ward off evil, infirmity and disease. At the same time, devotees extoll Mitra (Vedic Mitra-Varuna) as the Pratyaksha devata, the māyā́-minded, far-sighted, thousand-eyed light and fire of the Sun, worship of whom is considered especially beneficial for ailments of the eye and mind.

In 2008 Mitrotsavam fell on Thursday, December 25.
