= RV8 =

RV8 may refer to:

- Mandala 8, the eighth mandala of the Rigveda
- MG RV8, a sports car produced by MG Cars
- Van's Aircraft RV-8, a kit aircraft
- Sonata No. 7 in C minor, RV 8, from Antonio Vivaldi's Twelve Trio Sonatas, Op. 2
