= RV5 =

RV5 may refer to:

- Mandala 5, the fifth mandala of the Rigveda
- Toyota RV-5, a concept vehicle
- Boss RV-5, a digital reverb pedal manufactured by Boss Corporation
- Norwegian National Road 5
