= Ashva =

Horses in Hinduism

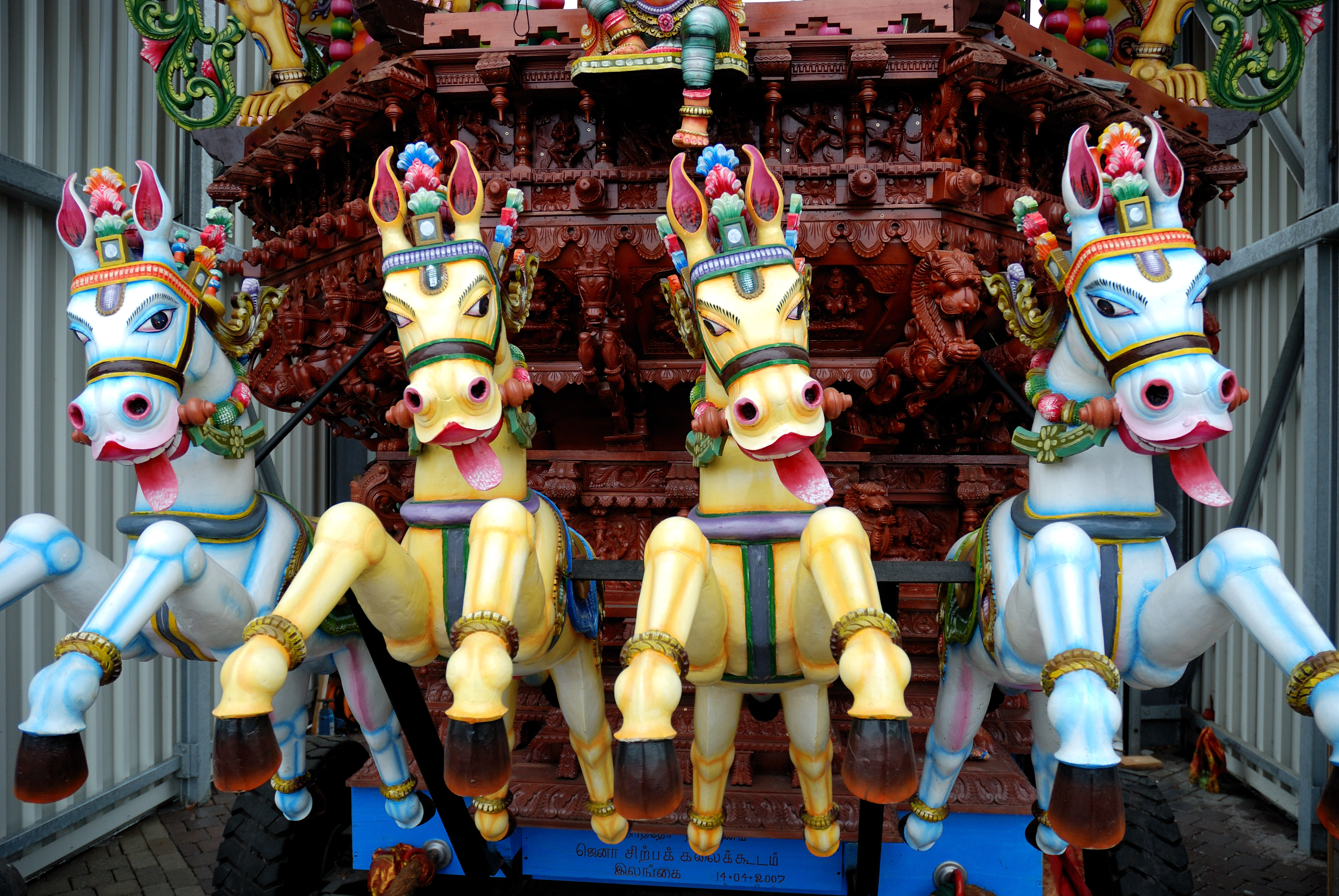
Ashva and chariot

Ashva (Sanskrit: अश्व, IAST: Aśva) is the Sanskrit word for a horse, one of the significant animals finding references in the Vedas as well as later Hindu scriptures. The word is cognate to Avestan 𐬀𐬯𐬞𐬀 (aspa), Latin equus, Ancient Greek ἵππος (hippos), Proto-Germanic *ehwaz, obsolete Prussian Lithuanian ašvà (from Proto-Balto-Slavic *éśwāˀ), all from Proto-Indo-European *h₁éḱwos.

== Usage in Vedas and Hindu mythology ==
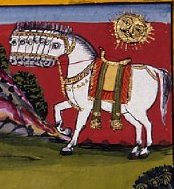
Uchchaihshravas

=== Vedas ===
There are repeated references to the horse the Vedas (c. 1500 - 500 BC). In particular, the Rigveda has many equestrian scenes, often associated with chariots.

The Ashvins are divine twins named for their horsemanship. Although the usual assumption has been that the Indo-Aryan migration relied heavily on riders, who may have introduced the domesticated horse to the subcontinent, there are few clear references to actual horse riding in their earliest text, the Rigveda, most clearly in RV 5.61.2-3, describing the Maruts as riders:

Where are your horses, where the reins? How came ye? how had ye the power? Rein was on nose and seat on back.
The whip is laid upon the flank. The heroes stretch their thighs apart, like women when the babe is born. (trans. Griffith)

According to RV 7.18.19, Dasyu tribes (the Ajas, Shigrus and Yakshus) also had horses. McDonnell and Keith point out that the Rigveda does not describe people riding horses in battle. This is in accord with the usual dating of the Rigveda to the late Bronze Age, when horses played a role as means of transport primarily as draught animals (while the introduction of cavalry dates to the early Iron Age, possibly an Iranian (specifically Parthian) innovation of around the 9th century BC).

RV 1.163.2 mythologically alludes to the introduction of the horse and horseriding:

This Steed which Yama gave hath Trita harnessed, and him, the first of all, hath Indra mounted.
His bridle the Gandharva grasped. O Vasus, from out the Sun ye fashioned forth the Courser. (trans. Griffith)

In RV 1.162.18, the sacrificial horse is described as having 34 (2x17) ribs:

The four-and-thirty ribs of the Swift Charger, kin to the Gods, the slayer's hatchet pierces.
Cut ye with skill, so that the parts be flawless, and piece by piece declaring them dissect them. (trans. Griffith)

The Ashvamedha or horse sacrifice is a notable ritual of the Yajurveda.

=== Hindu mythology ===
One of the famous avatars of Vishnu, Hayagriva, is depicted with a horse head. Hayagriva is worshipped as the God for Knowledge.

The legend of Uchchaihshravas states that the first horse emerged from the depth of the ocean during the churning of the oceans. It was a horse with white color and had two wings. It was known by the name of Uchchaihshravas. The legend continues that Indra, one of the gods of the Hindus, took away the mythical horse to his celestial abode, the svarga (heaven). Subsequently, Indra severed the wings of the horse and presented the same to the mankind. The wings were severed to ensure the horse remains on the earth (prithvi) and does not fly back to Indra's suvarga.

=== Modern interpretations ===
According to Aurobindo (Secret of the Veda, pp. 44), Asva may not always denote the horse. Aurobindo argued the words asva and asvavati symbolize energy. Asva or Ratha was also interpreted to be sometimes the "psycho-physical complex on which the Atman stands or in which it is seated". In another symbolic interpretation based on RV 1.164.2 and Nirukta 4.4.27, asva may also sometimes symbolize the sun.

== See also ==
- Ashvamedha – Horse sacrifice ritual followed by the Śrauta tradition of Vedic religion
- Ashvins – Hindu twin gods of medicine
- Ratha – Indo-Iranian term for a spoked-wheel chariot
