= Friedrich August Rosen =

German orientalist (1805–1837)

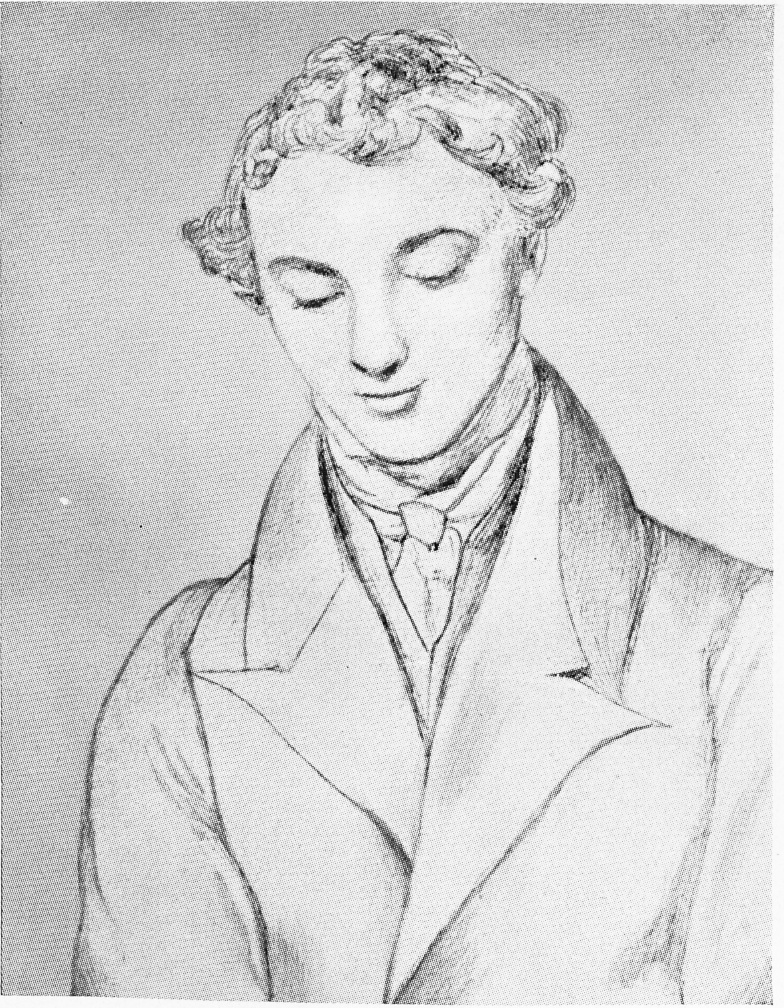
Friedrich August Rosen

Friedrich August Rosen (2 September 1805 in Hannover – 12 September 1837 in London) was a German Orientalist, brother of Georg Rosen and a close friend of Felix Mendelssohn Bartholdy. He studied in Leipzig, and from 1824 in Berlin under Franz Bopp. He was briefly professor of oriental literature at the University of London and became secretary of the Royal Asiatic Society in 1831.

He translated an Arabic text on Algebra by Al-Khwarizmi.

His Rigvedae specimen, excerpts from the Rigveda based on manuscripts brought back from India by Colebrooke, were enthusiastically received by European academia as the first authentic evidence of the archaic Vedic Sanskrit language. His most important work was an edition of the entire Rigveda, left incomplete at his premature death shortly after his 32nd birthday. His translation of the first book of the Rigveda appeared posthumously in 1838. The remaining books remained unedited for another five decades, until the editio princeps of Max Müller in 1890-92.

Rosen also produced the first English translation of the Kitab al-Jabr wa-l-Muqabala of al-Khwārizmī, in 1831.

== Works ==
- "Radices linguae sanscritae" (Berlin 1827).
- Rigvedae specimen (London, 1830)
- the Algebra of Mohammed ben Musa (London 1831)
- Rigveda-Sanhita, "liber primus, sanscrite et latine" (London 1838)

== Sources ==
- Meyers Konversationslexikon
- Rosen, Friedrich in Allgemeine Deutsche Biographie
