= Mandala 3 =

Third book of the Rigveda

The third Mandala of the Rigveda has 62 hymns, mainly to Agni and Indra. It is one of the "family books" (mandalas 2-7), the oldest core of the Rigveda, which were composed in early Vedic period (1500 – 1000 BCE). Most hymns in this book are attributed to Viśvāmitra Gāthinaḥ.

The verse 3.62.10 gained great importance in Hinduism as the Gayatri Mantra.

== List of incipits ==
The dedication as given by Griffith is in square brackets:

3.1 (235) [ Agni.] sómasya mā tavásaṃ vákṣi agne
3.2 (236) [Agni.] vaiśvānarâya dhiṣáṇām ṛtāvŕdhe
3.3 (237) [Agni.] vaiśvānarâya pṛthupâjase vípo
3.4 (238) [ Apris.] samít-samit sumánā bodhi asmé
3.5 (239) [Agni.] práti agnír uṣásaś cékitāno
3.6 (240) [Agni.] prá kāravo mananâ vacyámānā
3.7 (241) [Agni.] prá yá ārúḥ śitipṛṣṭhásya dhāsér
3.8 (242) [Sacrificial Post.] añjánti tvâm adhvaré devayánto
3.9 (243) [Agni.] sákhāyas tvā vavṛmahe
3.10 (244) [Agni.] tuvâm agne manīṣíṇaḥ
3.11 (245) [Agni.] agnír hótā puróhito
3.12 (246) [ Indra-Agni.] índrāgnī â gataṃ sutáṃ
3.13 (247) [Agni.] prá vo devâya agnáye
3.14 (248) [Agni.] â hótā mandró vidáthāni asthāt
3.15 (249) [Agni.] ví pâjasā pṛthúnā śóśucāno
3.16 (250) [Agni.] ayám agníḥ suvîryasya
3.17 (251) [Agni.] samidhyámānaḥ prathamânu dhármā
3.18 (252) [Agni.] bhávā no agne sumánā úpetau
3.19 (253) [Agni.] agníṃ hótāram prá vṛṇe miyédhe
3.20 (254) [Agni.] agním uṣásam aśvínā dadhikrâṃ
3.21 (255) [Agni.] imáṃ no yajñám amŕteṣu dhehi
3.22 (256) [Agni.] ayáṃ só agnír yásmin sómam índraḥ
3.23 (257) [Agni.] nírmathitaḥ súdhita â sadhásthe
3.24 (258) [Agni.] ágne sáhasva pŕtanā
3.25 (259) [Agni.] ágne diváḥ sūnúr asi prácetās
3.26 (260) [Agni.] vaiśvānarám mánasāgníṃ nicâyiyā
3.27 (261) [Agni.] prá vo vâjā abhídyavo
3.28 (262) [Agni.] ágne juṣásva no havíḥ
3.29 (263) [Agni.] ástīdám adhimánthanam
3.30 (264) [Indra.] ichánti tvā somiyâsaḥ sákhāyaḥ
3.31 (265) [Indra.] śâsad váhnir duhitúr naptíyaṃ gād
3.32 (266) [Indra.] índra sómaṃ somapate píbemám
3.33 (267) [Indra.] prá párvatānām uśatî upásthād
3.34 (268) [Indra.] índraḥ pūrbhíd âtirad dâsam arkaír
3.35 (269) [Indra.] tíṣṭhā hárī rátha â yujyámānā
3.36 (270) [Indra.] imâm ū ṣú prábhṛtiṃ sātáye dhāḥ
3.37 (271) [Indra.] vârtrahatyāya śávase
3.38 (272) [Indra.] abhí táṣṭeva dīdhayā manīṣâm
3.39 (273) [Indra.] índram matír hṛdá â vacyámānā
3.40 (274) [Indra.] índra tvā vṛṣabháṃ vayáṃ
3.41 (275) [Indra.] â tû na indra madríag
3.42 (276) [Indra.] úpa naḥ sutám â gahi
3.43 (277) [Indra.] â yāhi arvâṅ úpa vandhureṣṭhâs
3.44 (278) [Indra.] ayáṃ te astu haryatáḥ
3.45 (279) [Indra.] â mandraír indra háribhir
3.46 (280) [Indra.] yudhmásya te vṛṣabhásya svarâja
3.47 (281) [Indra.] marútvāṁ indra vṛṣabhó ráṇāya
3.48 (282) [Indra.] sadyó ha jātó vṛṣabháḥ kanînaḥ
3.49 (283) [Indra.] śáṃsā mahâm índaraṃ yásmi * víśvā
3.50 (284) [Indra.] índraḥ svâhā pibatu yásya sóma
3.51 (285) [Indra.] carṣaṇīdhŕtam maghávānam ukthíyam
3.52 (286) [Indra.] dhānâvantaṃ karambhíṇam
3.53 (287) [Indra, Parvata, Etc.] índrāparvatā bṛhatâ ráthena
3.54 (288) [ Visvedevas.] imám mahé vidathíyāya śūṣáṃ
3.55 (289) [Visvedevas.] uṣásaḥ pûrvā ádha yád viūṣúr
3.56 (290) [Visvedevas.] ná tâ minanti māyíno ná dhîrā
3.57 (291) [Visvedevas.] prá me vivikvâṁ avidan manīṣâṃ
3.58 (292) [ Asvins.] dhenúḥ pratnásya kâmiyaṃ dúhānā
3.59 (293) [ Mitra.] mitró jánān yātayati bruvāṇó
3.60 (294) [ Rbhus.] ihéha vo mánasā bandhútā nara
3.61 (295) [ Uṣas.] úṣo vâjena vājini prácetā
3.62 (296) [Indra and Others.] imâ u vām bhṛmáyo mányamānā
