= Rigveda =

First sacred canonical text of Hinduism

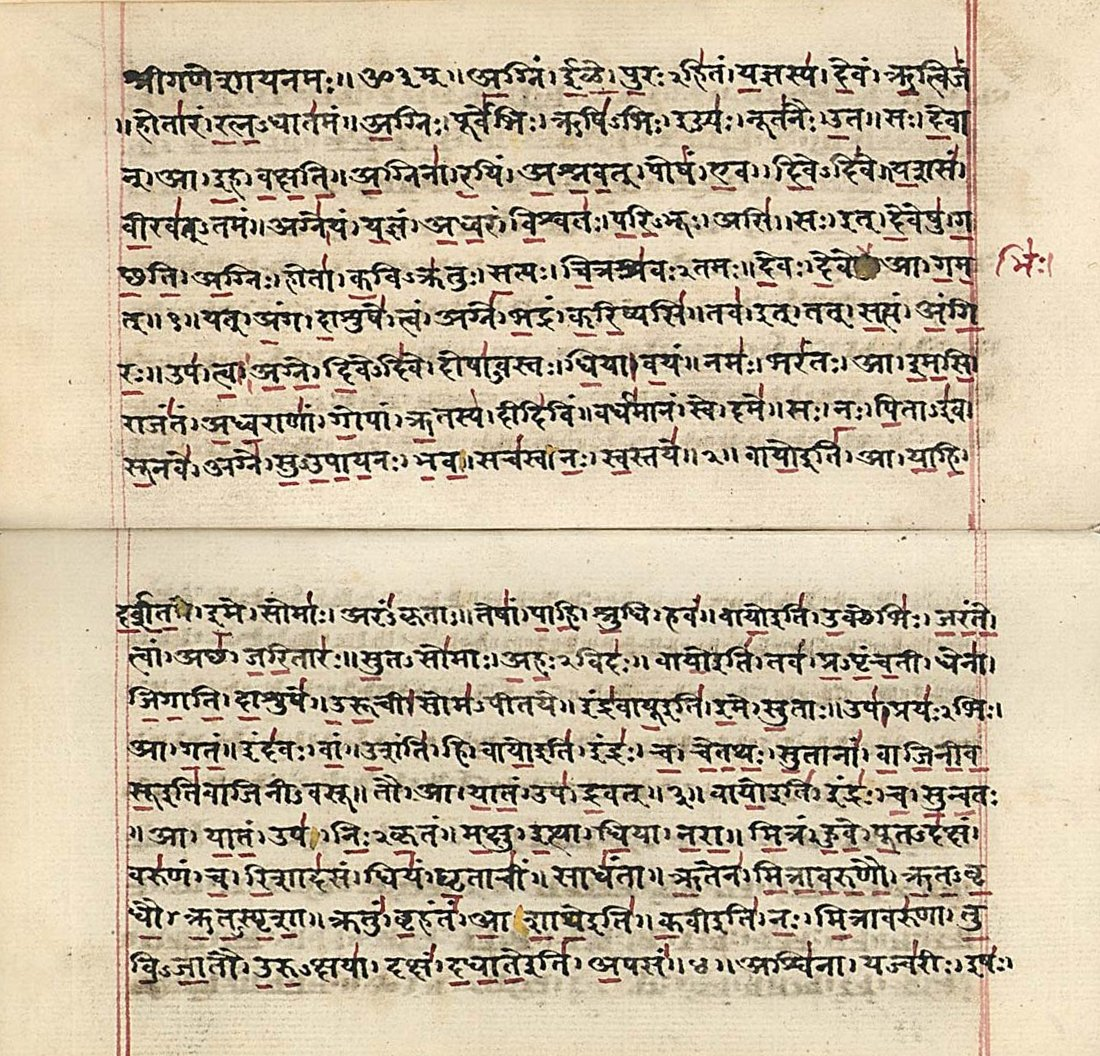
- Rigveda (padapāṭha) manuscript in Devanāgarī, early 19th century. After a scribal benediction (śrīgaṇéśāyanamaḥ oṁ), the first line has the first pada, RV 1.1.1a (agniṃ iḷe puraḥ-hitaṃ yajñasya devaṃ ṛtvijaṃ – "I praise Agni, the chosen Priest, God, minister of sacrifice"). The pitch-accent is marked by underscores and vertical overscores in red.

Information
- Religion: Historical Vedic religion Hinduism
- Language: Vedic Sanskrit
- Period: c. 1500–1000 BCE (Note: It is certain that the hymns of the Rig Veda post-date Indo-Iranian separation of c. 2000 BCE and probably that of the relevant Mitanni documents of c. 1400 BCE. Philological estimates tend to date the bulk of the text to the second half of the second millennium: Max Müller: "the hymns of the Rig-Veda are said to date from 1500 B.C."; The EIEC (s.v. Indo-Iranian languages, p. 306) gives 1500–1000 BCE.; Flood and Witzel both mention c. 1500–1200 BCE.; Anthony mentions c. 1500–1300 BCE.; Thomas Oberlies (Die Religion des Rgveda, 1998, p. 158) based on 'cumulative evidence' sets a wide range of 1700–1100 BCE. Oberlies 1998, p. 155 gives an estimate of 1100 BCE for the youngest hymns in book 10.; Witzel 1995, p. 4 mentions c. 1500–1200 BCE. According to Witzel 1997, p. 263, the whole Rig Vedic period may have lasted from c. 1900 BCE to c. 1200 BCE: "the bulk of the RV represents only 5 or 6 generations of kings (and of the contemporary poets) of the Pūru and Bharata tribes. It contains little else before and after this 'snapshot' view of contemporary Rgvedic history, as reported by these contemporary 'tape recordings.' On the other hand, the whole Rgvedic period may have lasted even up to 700 years, from the infiltration of the Indo-Aryans into the subcontinent, c. 1900 B.C. (at the utmost, the time of collapse of the Indus civilization), up to c. 1200 B.C., the time of the introduction of iron which is first mentioned in the clearly post-Rgvedic hymns of the Atharvaveda.") (Vedic period)
- Chapters: 10 mandalas
- Verses: 10,552 mantras

The Rigveda or Rig Veda (Sanskrit: ऋग्वेद, IAST: ṛgvedá, from ऋच्, "praise" and वेद, "knowledge") is an ancient Indian collection of Vedic Sanskrit hymns (sūktas). It is one of the four sacred canonical Hindu texts (śruti) known as the Vedas. Only one Shakha of the many survive today, namely the Śakalya Shakha. Much of the contents contained in the remaining Shakhas are now lost or are not available in the public forum.

The Rigveda is the oldest known Vedic Sanskrit text. Its early layers are among the oldest extant texts in any Indo-European language. (Note: According to Edgar Polomé, the Hittite language Anitta text from the 17th century BCE is older. This text is about the conquest of Kanesh city of Anatolia. Other Hittite texts mention gods which Polomé identifies as being analogous to those mentioned in the Rigveda, such as Tarḫunna being similar to the Vedic Indra.) Most scholars believe that the sounds and texts of the Rigveda have been orally transmitted with precision since the 2nd millennium BCE, through methods of memorisation of exceptional complexity, rigour and fidelity, though the dates are not confirmed and remain contentious until concrete evidence surfaces. Philological and linguistic evidence indicates that the bulk of the Rigveda Samhita was composed in the northwestern region of the Indian subcontinent (see Rigvedic rivers), most likely between c. 1500 and 1000 BCE, although a wider approximation of c. 1900–1200 BCE has also been given.

The text is layered, consisting of the Samhita, Brahmanas, Aranyakas and Upanishads. (Note: The associated material has been preserved from two śākhās or "schools", known as Śākalya and Bāṣkala. The school-specific commentaries are known as Brahmanas (Aitareya-brahmana and Kaushitaki-brahmana) Aranyakas (Aitareya-aranyaka and Kaushitaki-aranyaka), and Upanishads (partly excerpted from the Aranyakas: Bahvrca-brahmana-upanishad, Aitareya-upanishad, Samhita-upanishad, Kaushitaki-upanishad).) The Rigveda Samhita is the core text and is a collection of 10 books (maṇḍalas) with 1,028 hymns (sūktas) in about 10,600 verses (called ṛc, eponymous of the name Rigveda). In the eight books – Books 2 through 9 – that were composed the earliest, the hymns predominantly discuss cosmology, rites required to earn the favour of the gods, as well as praise them. The more recent books (Books 1 and 10) in part also deal with philosophical or speculative questions, virtues such as dāna (charity) in society, questions about the origin of the universe and the nature of the divine, and other metaphysical issues in their hymns.

The hymns of the Rigveda are notably similar to the most archaic poems of the Iranian and Greek language families, the Gathas of old Avestan and Iliad of Homer. The Rigveda's preserved archaic syntax and morphology are of vital importance in the reconstruction of the common ancestor language Proto-Indo-European. Some of its verses continue to be recited during Hindu prayer and celebration of rites of passage (such as weddings), making it probably the world's oldest religious text in continued use.

== Dating and historical context ==
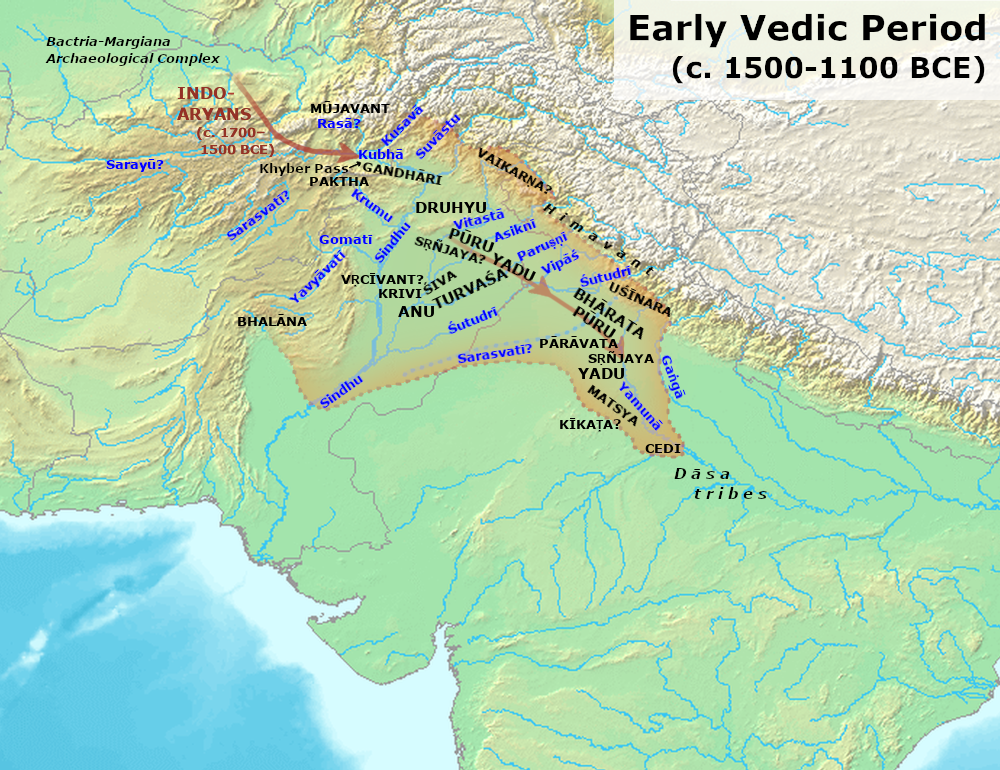
A map of tribes and rivers mentioned in the Rigveda.

=== Dating ===
According to Jamison and Brereton, in their 2014 translation of the Rigveda, the dating of this text "has been and is likely to remain a matter of contention and reconsideration". The dating proposals so far are all inferred from the style and the content within the hymns themselves. Philological estimates tend to date the bulk of the text to the second half of the second millennium BCE. Being composed in an early Indo-Aryan language, the hymns must post-date the Indo-Iranian separation, dated to roughly 2000 BCE. A reasonable date close to that of the composition of the core of the Rigveda is that of the Mitanni documents of northern Syria and Iraq (c. 1450–1350 BCE), which also mention the Vedic gods such as Varuna, Mitra and Indra. Some scholars have suggested that the Rig Veda was composed on the banks of a river in Haraxvaiti province in southern Afghanistan (Persian: Harahvati; Sanskrit: Sarasvati; possibly the Helmand or Arghandab). Other evidence also points to a composition date close to 1400 BCE. The earliest texts were composed in the northwestern regions of the Indian subcontinent, and the more philosophical later texts were most likely composed in or around the region that is the modern era state of Haryana.

The Rigveda's core is accepted to date to the late Bronze Age, making it one of the few examples with an unbroken tradition. Its composition is usually dated to roughly between c. 1500 and 1000 BCE. According to Michael Witzel, the codification of the Rigveda took place at the end of the Rigvedic period between c. 1200 and 1000 BCE, in the early Kuru kingdom. Asko Parpola argues that the Rigveda was systematized around 1000 BCE, at the time of the Kuru kingdom.

No written records from such an early period survive, if any ever existed, but scholars are generally confident that the oral transmission of the texts is reliable: they are ceremonial literature, where the exact phonetic expression and its preservation were a part of the historic tradition.

=== Historical and societal context ===
The Rigveda is far more archaic than any other Indo-Aryan text. For this reason, it was in the centre of attention of Western scholarship from the times of Max Müller and Rudolf Roth onwards. The Rigveda records an early stage of Vedic religion. There are strong linguistic and cultural similarities with the early Iranian Avesta, deriving from the Proto-Indo-Iranian times, often associated with the early Andronovo culture of c. 2000 BCE.

The Rigveda offers no direct evidence of social or political systems in the Vedic era, whether ordinary or elite. Only hints such as cattle raising and horse racing are discernible, and the text offers very general ideas about the ancient Indian society. There is no evidence, state Jamison and Brereton, of any elaborate, pervasive or structured caste system. Social stratification seems embryonic, then and later a social ideal rather than a social reality. The society was semi-nomadic and pastoral with evidence of agriculture since hymns mention plow and celebrate agricultural divinities. There was division of labor and a complementary relationship between kings and poet-priests but no discussion of a relative status of social classes. Women in the Rigveda appear disproportionately as speakers in dialogue hymns, both as mythical or divine Indrani, Apsaras Urvasi, or Yami, as well as Apāla Ātreyī (RV 8.91), Godhā (RV 10.134.6), Ghoṣā Kākṣīvatī (RV 10.39.40), Romaśā (RV 1.126.7), Lopāmudrā (RV 1.179.1–2), Viśvavārā Ātreyī (RV 5.28), Śacī Paulomī (RV 10.159), Śaśvatī Āṅgirasī (RV 8.1.34). The women of the Rigveda are quite outspoken and appear more sexually confident than men, in the text. Elaborate and aesthetic hymns on wedding suggest rites of passage had developed during the Rigvedic period. There is little evidence of dowry and no evidence of sati in it or related Vedic texts.

The Rigvedic hymns mention rice and porridge, in hymns such as 8.83, 8.70, 8.77 and 1.61 in some versions of the text; however, there is no discussion of rice cultivation. The term áyas (metal) occurs in the Rigveda, but it is unclear which metal it was. Iron is not mentioned in Rigveda, something scholars have used to help date Rigveda to have been composed before 1000 BCE. Hymn 5.63 mentions "metal cloaked in gold", suggesting that metalworking had progressed in the Vedic culture.

Some of the names of gods and goddesses found in the Rigveda are found amongst other belief systems based on Proto-Indo-European religion, while most of the words used share common roots with words from other Indo-European languages. However, about 300 words in the Rigveda are neither Indo-Aryan nor Indo-European, states the Sanskrit and Vedic literature scholar Frits Staal. Of these 300, many – such as kapardin, kumara, kumari, kikata – come from Munda or proto-Munda languages found in the eastern and northeastern (Assamese) region of India, with roots in Austroasiatic languages. The others in the list of 300 – such as mleccha and nir – have Dravidian roots found in the southern region of India, or are of Tibeto-Burman origins. A few non-Indo-European words in the Rigveda – such as for camel, mustard and donkey – belong to a possibly lost Central Asian language. (Note: The horse (ashva), cattle, sheep and goat play an important role in the Rigveda. There are also references to the elephant (Hastin, Varana), camel (Ustra, especially in Mandala 8), ass (khara, rasabha), buffalo (Mahisa), wolf, hyena, lion (Simha), mountain goat (sarabha) and to the gaur in the Rigveda. The peafowl (mayura), the goose (hamsa) and the chakravaka (Tadorna ferruginea) are some birds mentioned in the Rigveda.) The linguistic sharing provides clear indications, states Michael Witzel, that the people who spoke Rigvedic Sanskrit already knew and interacted with Munda and Dravidian speakers.

== Text ==
=== Composition ===
The "family books" (2–7) are associated with various clans and chieftains, containing hymns by members of the same clan in each book; but other clans are also represented in the Rigveda. The family books are associated with specific regions, and mention prominent Bharata and Pūru kings.

Tradition associates a rishi (the composer) with each ṛc (verse) of the Rigveda. Most sūktas are attributed to single composers; (Note: Semi-mythical divinely inspired maharishis are believed to have composed the Rigvedic hymns. The main contributors were Angiras, Kanva, Vasishtha, and Vishvamitra. Among the other celebrated authors are Atri, Bhrigu, Kashyapa, Gritsamada, Agastya, Bharadvaja, as well as female sages Lopamudra and Ghosha. In a few cases, more than one rishi is given, signifying lack of certainty.) for each of them the Rigveda includes a lineage-specific āprī hymn (a special sūkta of rigidly formulaic structure, used for rituals). In all, 10 families of rishis account for more than 95 per cent of the ṛcs.

Book	Clan	Region
Mandala 2	Gṛtsamāda	NW, Punjab
Mandala 3	Viśvāmitra	Punjab, Sarasvatī
Mandala 4	Vāmadeva	NW, Punjab
Mandala 5	Atri	NW → Punjab → Yamunā
Mandala 6	Bharadvāja	NW, Punjab, Sarasvati; → Gaṅgā
Mandala 7	Vasiṣṭha	Punjab, Sarasvati; → Yamunā
Mandala 8	Kaṇva and Āṅgirasa	NW, Punjab

=== Collection and organisation ===
The codification of the Rigveda took place late in the Rigvedic or rather in the early post-Rigvedic period at c. 1200 BCE, by members of the early Kuru tribe, when the centre of Vedic culture moved east from the Punjab into what is now Uttar Pradesh. The Rigveda was codified by compiling the hymns, including the arrangement of the individual hymns in ten books, coeval with the composition of the younger Veda Samhitas. According to Witzel, the initial collection took place after the Bharata victory in the Battle of the Ten Kings, under king Sudās, over other Puru kings. This collection was an effort to reconcile various factions in the clans which were united in the Kuru kingdom under a Bharata king. (Note: Witzel: "The original collection must have been the result of a strong political effort aiming at the re-alignment of the various factions in the tribes and poets' clans under a post-Sudås Bharata hegemony which included (at least sections of) their former Pūru enemies and some other tribes.) This collection was re-arranged and expanded in the Kuru kingdom, reflecting the establishment of a new Bharata-Puru lineage and new srauta rituals. (Note: Witzel: "To sum up: as has been discussed in detail elsewhere [Early Sanskritization], the new Kuru dynasty of Parik it, living in the Holy Land of Kuruk etra, unified most of the Rigvedic tribes, brought the poets and priests together in the common enterprise of collecting their texts and of "reforming" the ritual.")

The fixing of the Vedic chant (by enforcing regular application of sandhi) and of the padapatha (by dissolving Sandhi out of the earlier metrical text), occurred during the later Brahmana period, in roughly the 6th century BCE.

The surviving form of the Rigveda is based on an early Iron Age collection that established the core 'family books' (mandalas 2–7, ordered by author, deity and metre) and a later redaction, coeval with the redaction of the other Vedas, dating several centuries after the hymns were composed. This redaction also included some additions (contradicting the strict ordering scheme) and orthoepic changes to the Vedic Sanskrit such as the regularization of sandhi (termed orthoepische Diaskeuase by Oldenberg, 1888).

=== Organisation ===
==== Mandalas ====
The text is organized in ten "books", or maṇḍalas ("circles"), of varying age and length. The "family books", mandalas 2–7, are the oldest part of the Rigveda and the shortest books; they are arranged by length (decreasing length of hymns per book) and account for 38% of the text.

The hymns are arranged in collections each dealing with a particular deity: Agni comes first, Indra comes second, and so on. They are attributed and dedicated to a rishi (sage) and his family of students. Within each collection, the hymns are arranged in descending order of the number of stanzas per hymn. If two hymns in the same collection have equal numbers of stanzas then they are arranged so that the number of syllables in the metre are in descending order. The second to seventh mandalas have a uniform format.

The eighth and ninth mandalas, comprising hymns of mixed age, account for 15% and 9%, respectively. The ninth mandala is entirely dedicated to Soma and the Soma ritual. The hymns in the ninth mandala are arranged by both their prosody structure (chanda) and by their length.

The first and the tenth mandalas are the youngest; they are also the longest books, of 191 suktas each, accounting for 37% of the text. Nevertheless, some of the hymns in mandalas 8, 1 and 10 may still belong to an earlier period and may be as old as the material in the family books. The first mandala has a unique arrangement not found in the other nine mandalas. The first 84 hymns of the tenth mandala have a structure different from the remaining hymns in it.

==== Hymns and prosody ====
Each mandala consists of hymns or sūktas (su- + ukta, literally, "well recited, eulogy") intended for various rituals. The sūktas in turn consist of individual stanzas called ṛc ("praise", pl. ṛcas), which are further analysed into units of verse called pada ("foot" or step).

The hymns of the Rigveda are in different poetic metres in Vedic Sanskrit. The metres most used in the ṛcas are the gayatri (3 verses of 8 syllables), anushtubh (4×8), trishtubh (4×11) and jagati (4×12). The trishtubh metre (40%) and gayatri metre (25%) dominate in the Rigveda.

Metre (Note: The total number of verses and metre counts show minor variations with the manuscript.)	Rigvedic verses
Gayatri	2451
Ushnih	341
Anushtubh	855
Brihati	181
Pankti	312
Trishtubh	4253
Jagati	1348
Atigagati	17
Sakvari	19
Atisakvari	9
Ashti	6
Atyashti	84
Dhriti	2
Atidhriti	1
Ekapada	6
Dvipada	17
Pragatha Barhata	388
Pragatha Kakubha	110
Mahabarhata	2
Total	10402

=== Transmission ===
As with the other Vedas, the redacted text has been handed down in several versions, including the Padapatha, in which each word is isolated in pausal form and is used for just one way of memorization; and the Samhitapatha, which combines words according to the rules of sandhi (the process being described in the Pratisakhya) and is the memorized text used for recitation.

The Padapatha and the Pratisakhya anchor the text's true meaning, and the fixed text was preserved with unparalleled fidelity for more than a millennium by oral tradition alone. In order to achieve this the oral tradition prescribed very structured enunciation, involving breaking down the Sanskrit compounds into stems and inflections, as well as certain permutations. This interplay with sounds gave rise to a scholarly tradition of morphology and phonetics.

It is unclear as to when the Rigveda was first written down. The oldest surviving manuscripts have been discovered in Nepal and date to c. 1040 CE. According to Witzel, the Paippalada Samhita tradition points to written manuscripts c. 800–1000 CE. The Upanishads were likely in the written form earlier, about mid-1st millennium CE (Gupta Empire period). Attempts to write the Vedas may have been made "towards the end of the 1st millennium BCE". The early attempts may have been unsuccessful given the Smriti rules that forbade the writing down the Vedas, states Witzel. The oral tradition continued as a means of transmission until modern times.

=== Recensions ===
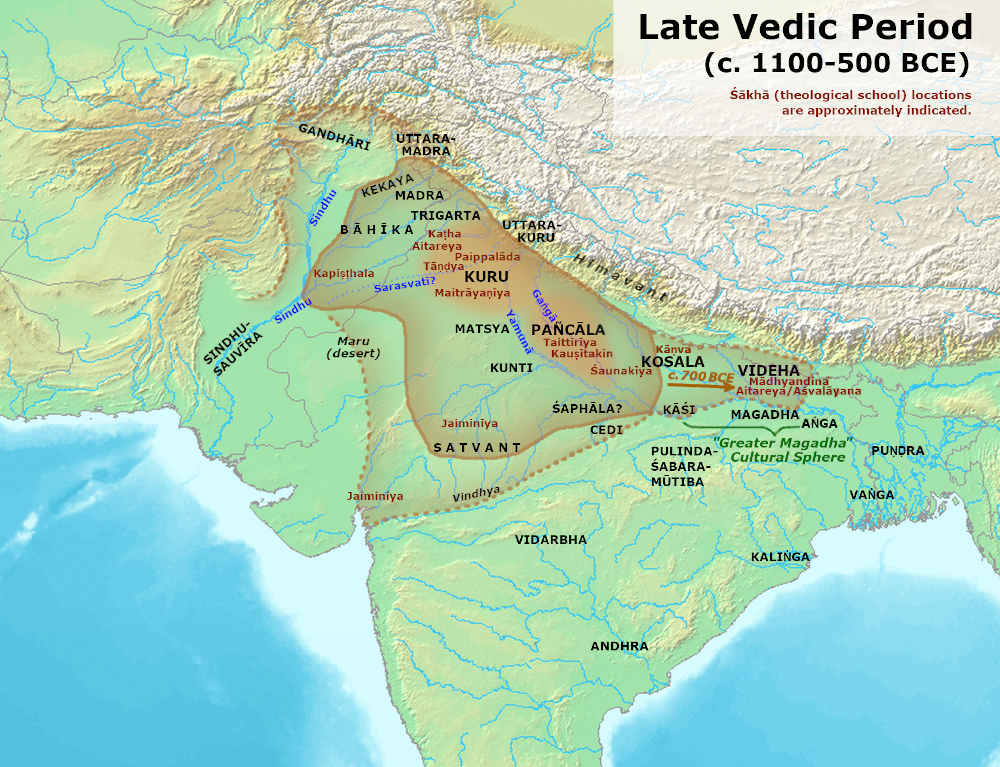
Geographical distribution of the Late Vedic Period. Each major region had its own recension of Rig Veda (Śākhās), and the versions varied.

Several shakhas (from skt. śākhā f. "branch", i. e. "recension") of the Rig Veda are known to have existed in the past. Of these, Śākala Śākhā (named after the scholar Śākalya) is the only one to have survived in its entirety. Another śākhā that may have survived is the Bāṣkala, although this is uncertain.

The surviving padapāṭha version of the Rigveda text is ascribed to Śākalya. The Śākala recension has 1,017 regular hymns, and an appendix of 11 vālakhilya hymns which are now customarily included in the 8th mandala (as 8.49–8.59), for a total of 1028 hymns. The Bāṣkala recension includes eight of these vālakhilya hymns among its regular hymns, making a total of 1025 regular hymns for this śākhā. In addition, the Bāṣkala recension has its own appendix of 98 hymns, the Khilani.

In the 1877 edition of Aufrecht, the 1028 hymns of the Rigveda contain a total of 10,552 ṛcs, or 39,831 padas. The Shatapatha Brahmana gives the number of syllables to be 432,000, while the metrical text of van Nooten and Holland (1994) has a total of 395,563 syllables (or an average of 9.93 syllables per pada); counting the number of syllables is not straightforward because of issues with sandhi and the post-Rigvedic pronunciation of syllables like súvar as svàr.

Three other shakhas are mentioned in Caraṇavyuha, a pariśiṣṭa (supplement) of Yajurveda: Māṇḍukāyana, Aśvalāyana and Śaṅkhāyana. The Atharvaveda lists two more shakhas. The differences between all these shakhas are very minor, limited to varying order of content and inclusion (or non-inclusion) of a few verses. The following information is known about the shakhas other than Śākala and Bāṣkala:

- Māṇḍukāyana: Perhaps the oldest of the Rigvedic shakhas.
- Aśvalāyana: Includes 212 verses, all of which are newer than the other Rigvedic hymns.
- Śaṅkhāyana: Very similar to Aśvalāyana
- Saisiriya: Mentioned in the Rigveda Pratisakhya. Very similar to Śākala, with a few additional verses; might have derived from or merged with it.

Shakha	Samhita	Brahmana	Aranyaka	Upanishad
Shaakala	Shaakala Samhita	Aitareya Brahmana	Aitareya Aranyaka	Aitareya Upanishad
Baashkala	Kaushitaki Samhita	Kaushitaki Brahmana	Manuscript exists	Kaushitaki Upanishad
Shankhayana	Sankhayana Samhita	Shankhayana Brahmana	Shankhyana Aranyaka	edited as a part of the Aranyaka

=== Manuscripts ===
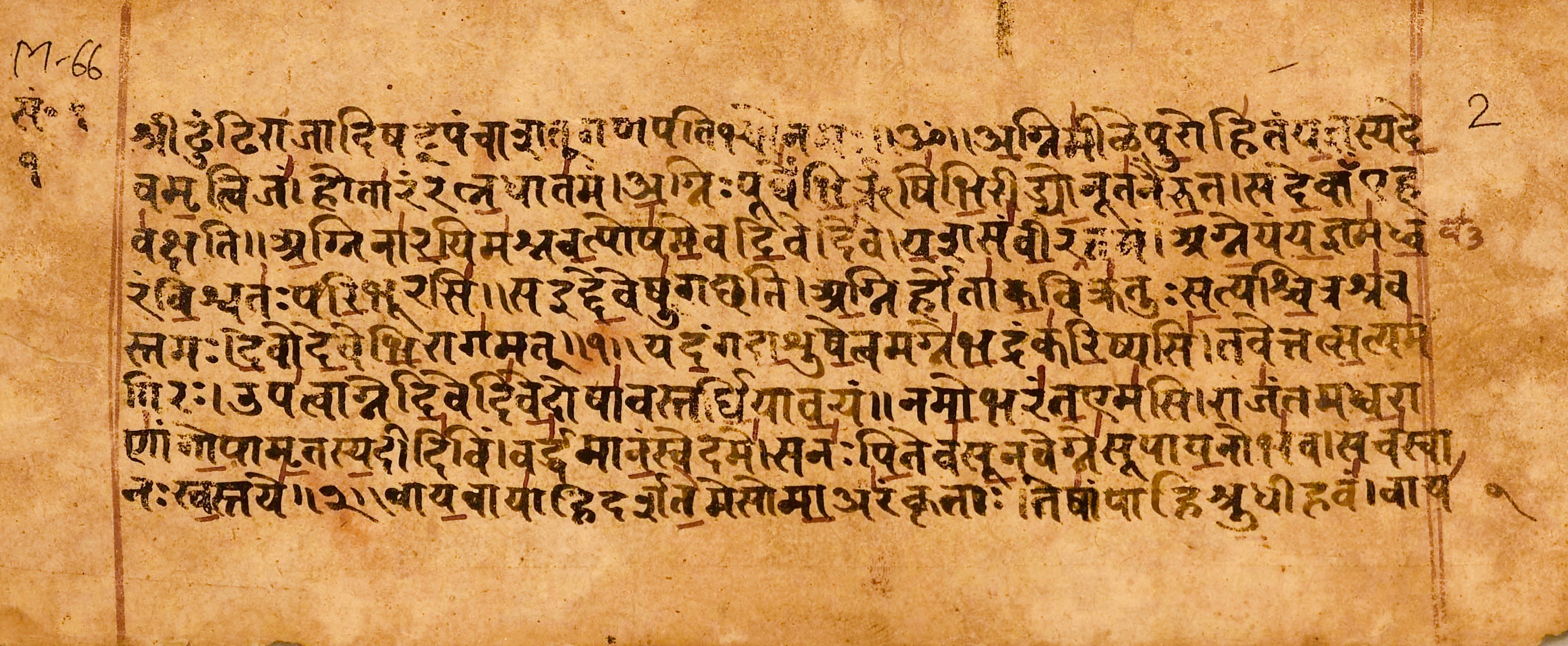
Rigveda manuscript page, Mandala 1, Hymn 1 (Sukta 1), lines 1.1.1 to 1.1.9 (Sanskrit, Devanagari script)

The Rigveda hymns were composed and preserved by oral tradition. They were memorized and verbally transmitted with "unparalleled fidelity" across generations for many centuries. According to Barbara West, it was probably first written down about the 3rd-century BCE. The manuscripts were made from birch bark or palm leaves, which decompose and therefore were routinely copied over the generations to help preserve the text.

==== Versions ====
There are, for example, thirty manuscripts of Rigveda at the Bhandarkar Oriental Research Institute, collected in the 19th century by Georg Bühler, Franz Kielhorn and others, originating from different parts of India, including Kashmir, Gujarat, the then Rajaputana, and Central Provinces. They were transferred to Deccan College, Pune, in the late 19th century. They are in the Sharada and Devanagari scripts, written on birch bark and paper. The oldest of the Pune collection is dated to 1464 CE. These thirty manuscripts were added to UNESCO's Memory of the World International Register in 2007.

Of these thirty manuscripts, nine contain the samhita text, five have the padapatha in addition. Thirteen contain Sayana's commentary. At least five manuscripts (MS. no. 1/A1879-80, 1/A1881-82, 331/1883-84 and 5/Viś I) have preserved the complete text of the Rigveda. MS no. 5/1875-76, written on birch bark in bold Sharada, was only in part used by Max Müller for his edition of the Rigveda with Sayana's commentary.

Müller used 24 manuscripts then available to him in Europe, while the Pune Edition used over five dozen manuscripts, but the editors of Pune Edition could not procure many manuscripts used by Müller and by the Bombay Edition, as well as from some other sources; hence the total number of extant manuscripts known then must surpass perhaps eighty at least.

==== Scripts ====
Rigveda manuscripts in paper, palm leaves and birch bark form, either in full or in portions, have been discovered in the following Indic scripts:

- Devanagari (Rajasthan, Maharashtra, Uttar Pradesh, Nepal)
- Grantha (Tamil Nadu)
- Malayalam (Kerala)
- Nandinagari (South India)
- Sharada (Punjab, Kashmir)

==== Comparison ====
The various Rigveda manuscripts discovered so far show some differences. Broadly, the most studied Śākala recension has 1017 hymns, includes an appendix of eleven valakhīlya hymns which are often counted with the eighth mandala, for a total of 1028 metrical hymns. The Bāṣakala version of Rigveda includes eight of these vālakhilya hymns among its regular hymns, making a total of 1025 hymns in the main text for this śākhā. The Bāṣakala text also has an appendix of 98 hymns, called the Khilani, bringing the total to 1,123 hymns. The manuscripts of Śākala recension of the Rigveda have about 10,600 verses, organized into ten Books (Mandalas). Books 2 through 7 are internally homogeneous in style, while Books 1, 8 and 10 are compilation of verses of internally different styles suggesting that these books are likely a collection of compositions by many authors.

The first mandala is the largest, with 191 hymns and 2006 verses, and it was added to the text after Books 2 through 9. The last, or the 10th Book, also has 191 hymns but 1754 verses, making it the second largest. The language analytics suggest the 10th Book, chronologically, was composed and added last. The content of the 10th Book also suggest that the authors knew and relied on the contents of the first nine books.

The Rigveda is the largest of the four Vedas, and many of its verses appear in the other Vedas. Almost all of the 1875 verses found in Samaveda are taken from different parts of the Rigveda, either once or as repetition, and rewritten in a chant song form. Books 8 and 9 of the Rigveda are by far the largest source of verses for Sama Veda. Book 10 contributes the largest number of the 1350 verses of Rigveda found in Atharvaveda, or about one fifth of the 5987 verses in the Atharvaveda text. A bulk of 1875 ritual-focussed verses of Yajurveda, in its numerous versions, also borrow and build upon the foundation of verses in Rigveda.

== Contents ==
Altogether the Rigveda consists of:

- the Samhita (hymns to the deities, the oldest part of the Rigveda)
- the Brahmanas, commentaries on the hymns
- the Aranyakas or "forest books"
- the Upanishads

In western usage, "Rigveda" usually refers to the Rigveda Samhita, while the Brahmanas are referred to as the "Rigveda Brahmanas" (etc.). Technically speaking, however, "the Rigveda" refers to the entire body of texts transmitted along with the Samhita portion. Different bodies of commentary were transmitted in the different shakhas or "schools". Only a small portion of these texts has been preserved: The texts of only two out of five shakhas mentioned by the Rigveda Pratishakhya have survived. The late (15th or 16th century) Shri Guru Charitra even claims the existence of twelve Rigvedic shakhas. The two surviving Rigvedic corpora are those of the Śākala and the Bāṣkala shakhas.

=== Hymns ===
The Rigvedic hymns are dedicated to various deities, chief of whom are Indra, a heroic god praised for having slain his enemy Vrtra; Agni, the sacrificial fire; and Soma, the sacred potion or the plant it is made from. Equally prominent gods are the Adityas or Asura gods Mitra–Varuna and Ushas (the dawn). Also invoked are Savitr, Vishnu, Rudra, Pushan, Brihaspati or Brahmanaspati, as well as deified natural phenomena such as Dyaus Pita (the shining sky, Father Heaven), Prithivi (the earth, Mother Earth), Surya (the sun god), Vayu or Vata (the wind), Apas (the waters), Parjanya (the thunder and rain), Vac (the word), many rivers (notably the Sapta Sindhu, and the Sarasvati River). The Adityas, Vasus, Rudras, Sadhyas, Ashvins, Maruts, Rbhus, and the Vishvadevas ("all-gods") as well as the "thirty-three gods" are the groups of deities mentioned.

- Mandala 1 comprises 191 hymns. Hymn 1.1 is addressed to Agni, and his name is the first word of the Rigveda. The remaining hymns are mainly addressed to Agni and Indra, as well as Varuna, Mitra, the Ashvins, the Maruts, Usas, Surya, Rbhus, Rudra, Vayu, Brhaspati, Visnu, Heaven and Earth, and all the Gods. This Mandala is dated to have been added to the Rigveda after Mandala 2 through 9, and includes the philosophical Riddle Hymn 1.164, which inspires chapters in later Upanishads such as the Mundaka.
- Mandala 2 comprises 43 hymns, mainly to Agni and Indra. It is chiefly attributed to the Rishi gṛtsamada śaunahotra.
- Mandala 3 comprises 62 hymns, mainly to Agni and Indra and the Vishvedevas. The verse 3.62.10 has great importance in Hinduism as the Gayatri Mantra. Most hymns in this book are attributed to viśvāmitra gāthinaḥ.
- Mandala 4 comprises 58 hymns, mainly to Agni and Indra as well as the Rbhus, Ashvins, Brhaspati, Vayu, Usas, etc. Most hymns in this book are attributed to vāmadeva gautama.
- Mandala 5 comprises 87 hymns, mainly to Agni and Indra, the Visvedevas ("the all gods"), the Maruts, the twin-deity Mitra-Varuna and the Asvins. Two hymns each are dedicated to Ushas (the dawn) and to Savitr. Most hymns in this book are attributed to the atri clan.
- Mandala 6 comprises 75 hymns, mainly to Agni and Indra, all the gods, Pusan, Ashvin, Usas, etc. Most hymns in this book are attributed to the bārhaspatya family of Bharadwāja.
- Mandala 7 comprises 104 hymns, to Agni, Indra, the Visvadevas, the Maruts, Mitra-Varuna, the Asvins, Ushas, Indra-Varuna, Varuna, Vayu (the wind), two each to Sarasvati (ancient river/goddess of learning) and Vishnu, and to others. Most hymns in this book are attributed to vasiṣṭha maitravaruṇi.
- Mandala 8 comprises 103 hymns to various gods. Hymns 8.49 to 8.59 are the apocryphal vālakhilya. Hymns 1–48 and 60–66 are attributed to the clan of the sade Kaṇva, the rest to other (mainly Āngirasa clan) poets.
- Mandala 9 comprises 114 hymns, entirely devoted to Soma Pavamāna, the cleansing of the sacred potion of the Vedic religion.
- Mandala 10 comprises additional 191 hymns, frequently in later language, addressed to Agni, Indra and various other deities. It contains the Nadistuti sukta which is in praise of rivers and is important for the reconstruction of the geography of the Vedic civilization and the Purusha sukta which has been important in studies of Vedic sociology. It also contains the Nasadiya sukta (Hymn of Creation) (10.129) which deals with multiple speculations about the creation of universe, and whether anyone can know the right answer. The marriage hymns (10.85) and the death hymns (10.10–18) still are of great importance in the performance of the corresponding Grhya rituals.

=== Rigveda Brahmanas ===
Of the Brahmanas that were handed down in the schools of the Bahvṛcas (i.e. "possessed of many verses"), as the followers of the Rigveda are called, two have come down to us, namely those of the Aitareyins and the Kaushitakins. The Aitareya-brahmana and the Kaushitaki- (or Sankhayana-) brahmana evidently have for their groundwork the same stock of traditional exegetic matter. They differ, however, considerably as regards both the arrangement of this matter and their stylistic handling of it, with the exception of the numerous legends common to both, in which the discrepancy is comparatively slight. There is also a certain amount of material peculiar to each of them.

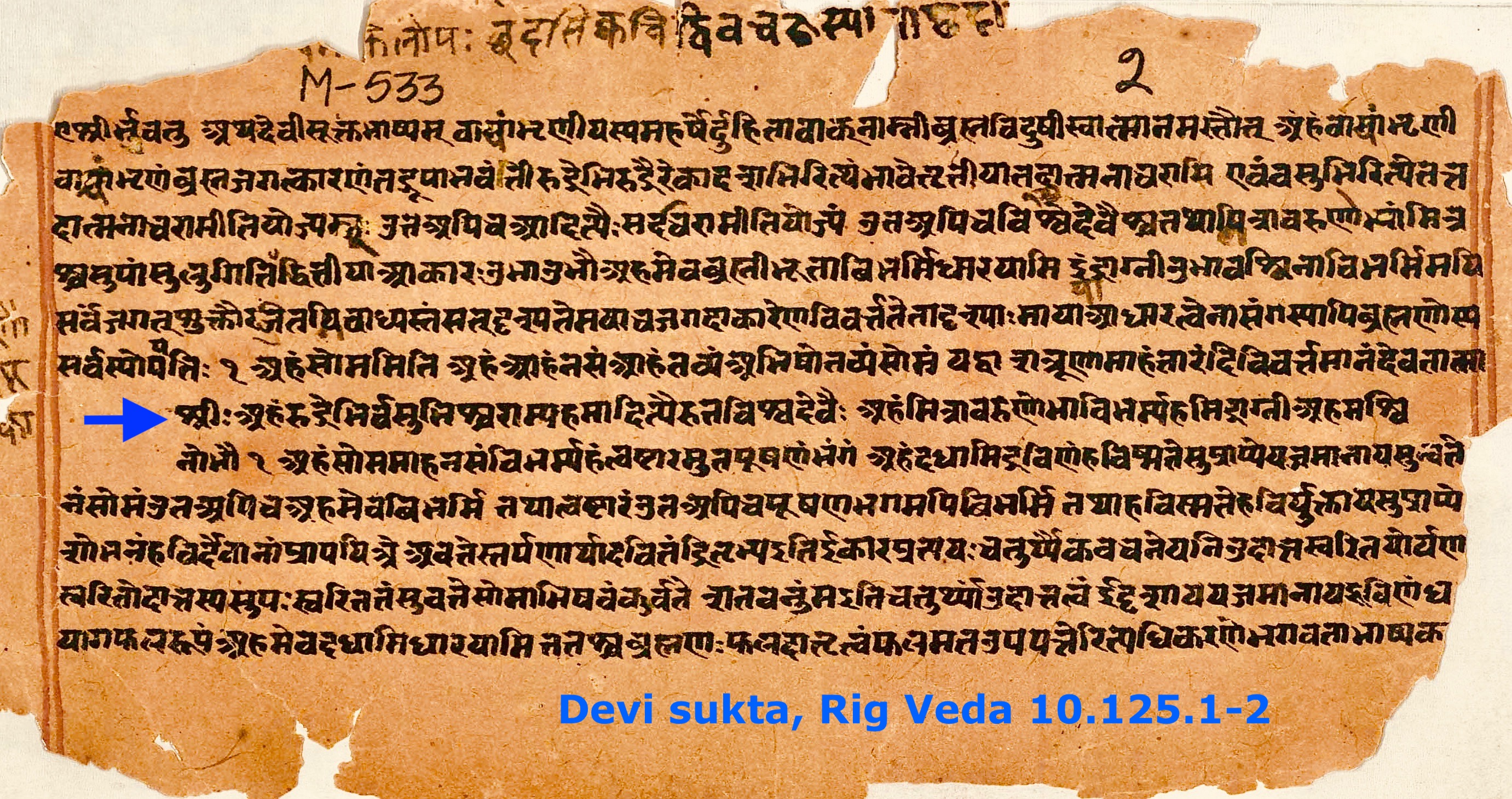
Devi sukta, which highlights the goddess tradition of Hinduism is found in Rigveda hymns 10.125. It is cited in Devi Mahatmya and is recited every year during the Durga Puja festival.

The Kaushitaka is, upon the whole, far more concise in its style and more systematic in its arrangement features which would lead one to infer that it is probably the more modern work of the two. It consists of 30 chapters (adhyaya); while the Aitareya has 40, divided into eight books (or pentads, pancaka), of five chapters each. The last 10 adhyayas of the latter work are, however, clearly a later addition though they must have already formed part of it at the time of Pāṇini (c. 5th century BCE), if, as seems probable, one of his grammatical sutras, regulating the formation of the names of Brahmanas, consisting of 30 and 40 adhyayas, refers to these two works. In this last portion occurs the well-known legend (also found in the Shankhayana-sutra, but not in the Kaushitaki-brahmana) of Shunahshepa, whom his father Ajigarta sells and offers to slay, the recital of which formed part of the inauguration of kings.

While the Aitareya deals almost exclusively with the Soma sacrifice, the Kaushitaka, in its first six chapters, treats of the several kinds of haviryajna, or offerings of rice, milk, ghee, etc., whereupon follows the Soma sacrifice in this way, that chapters 7–10 contain the practical ceremonial and 11–30 the recitations (shastra) of the hotar. Sayana, in the introduction to his commentary on the work, ascribes the Aitareya to the sage Mahidasa Aitareya (i.e. son of Itara), also mentioned elsewhere as a philosopher; and it seems likely enough that this person arranged the Brahmana and founded the school of the Aitareyins. Regarding the authorship of the sister work we have no information, except that the opinion of the sage Kaushitaki is frequently referred to in it as authoritative, and generally in opposition to the Paingya—the Brahmana, it would seem, of a rival school, the Paingins. Probably, therefore, it is just what one of the manuscripts calls it—the Brahmana of Sankhayana (composed) in accordance with the views of Kaushitaki.

=== Rigveda Aranyakas and Upanishads ===
Each of these two Brahmanas is supplemented by a "forest book", or Aranyaka. The Aitareyaranyaka is not a uniform production. It consists of five books (aranyaka), three of which, the first and the last two, are of a liturgical nature, treating of the ceremony called mahavrata, or great vow. The last of these books, composed in sutra form, is, however, doubtless of later origin, and is, indeed, ascribed by Hindu authorities either to Shaunaka or to Ashvalayana. The second and third books, on the other hand, are purely speculative, and are also styled the Bahvrca-brahmana-upanishad. Again, the last four chapters of the second book are usually singled out as the Aitareya Upanishad, ascribed, like its Brahmana (and the first book), to Mahidasa Aitareya; and the third book is also referred to as the Samhita-upanishad. As regards the Kaushitaki-aranyaka, this work consists of 15 adhyayas, the first two (treating of the mahavrata ceremony) and the 7th and 8th of which correspond to the first, fifth, and third books of the Aitareyaranyaka, respectively, whilst the four adhyayas usually inserted between them constitute the highly interesting Kaushitaki (Brahmana-) Upanishad, of which we possess two different recensions. The remaining portions (9–15) of the Aranyaka treat of the vital airs, the internal Agnihotra, etc., ending with the vamsha, or succession of teachers.

==== Significance ====
The text is a highly stylized poetical Vedic Sanskrit with praise addressed to the Vedic gods and chieftains. Most hymns, according to Witzel, were intended to be recited at the annual New Year Soma ritual. The text also includes some nonritual poetry, fragments of mythology, archaic formulas, and a number of hymns with early philosophical speculations. Composed by the poets of different clans, including famed Vedic rishis (sages) such as Vishvamitra and Vasishtha, these signify the power of prestige therewith to vac (speech, sound), a tradition set in place. The text introduced the prized concepts such as Rta (active realization of truth, cosmic harmony) which inspired the later Hindu concept of Dharma. The Rigvedic verses formulate this Rta as effected by Brahman, a significant and non-self-evident truth. The text also contains hymns of "highly poetical value" – some in dialogue form, along with love stories that likely inspired later Epic and classical poets of Hinduism, states Witzel.

According to Nadkarni, several hymns of the Rigveda embed cherished virtues and ethical statements. For example, verses 5.82.7, 6.44.8, 9.113.4, 10.133.6 and 10.190.1 mention truthful speech, truthful action, self-discipline and righteousness. Hymn 10.117 presents the significance of charity and of generosity between human beings, how helping someone in need is ultimately in the self-interest of the helper, its importance to an individual and the society. According to Jamison and Brereton, hymns 9.112 and 9.113 poetically state, "what everyone [humans and all living beings] really want is gain or an easy life", even a water drop has a goal – namely, "simply to seek Indra". These hymns present the imagery of being in heaven as "freedom, joy and satisfaction", a theme that appears in the Hindu Upanishads to characterize their teachings of self-realization.

==== Monism debate ====
While the older hymns of the Rigveda reflect sacrificial ritual typical of polytheism, its younger parts, specifically mandalas 1 and 10, have been noted as containing monistic or henotheistic speculations.

Nasadiya Sukta (10.129):

There was neither non-existence nor existence then;
Neither the realm of space, nor the sky which is beyond;
What stirred? Where? In whose protection?

There was neither death nor immortality then;
No distinguishing sign of night nor of day;
That One breathed, windless, by its own impulse;
Other than that there was nothing beyond.

Darkness there was at first, by darkness hidden;
Without distinctive marks, this all was water;
That which, becoming, by the void was covered;
That One by force of heat came into being;

Who really knows? Who will here proclaim it?
Whence was it produced? Whence is this creation?
Gods came afterwards, with the creation of this universe.
Who then knows whence it has arisen?

Whether God's will created it, or whether He was mute;
Perhaps it formed itself, or perhaps it did not;
Only He who is its overseer in highest heaven knows,
Only He knows, or perhaps He does not know.

— Rigveda 10.129 (Abridged, Tr: Kramer / Christian) This hymn is one of the roots of Hindu philosophy.

A widely cited example of such speculations is hymn 1.164.46:

They call him Indra, Mitra, Varuna, Agni, and he is heavenly nobly-winged Garutman.
To what is One, sages give many a title they call it Agni, Yama, Matarisvan.

— Rigveda 1.164.46, Translated by Ralph Griffith

Max Müller notably introduced the term "henotheism" for the philosophy expressed here, avoiding the connotations of "monotheism" in Judeo-Christian tradition. Other widely cited examples of monistic tendencies include hymns 1.164, 8.36 and 10.31, Other scholars state that the Rigveda includes an emerging diversity of thought, including monotheism, polytheism, henotheism and pantheism, the choice left to the preference of the worshipper. and the Nasadiya Sukta (10.129), one of the most widely cited Rigvedic hymns in popular western presentations.

Ruse (2015) commented on the old discussion of "monotheism" vs. "henotheism" vs. "monism" by noting an "atheistic streak" in hymns such as 10.130.

Examples from Mandala 1 adduced to illustrate the "metaphysical" nature of the contents of the younger hymns include: 1.164.34: "What is the ultimate limit of the earth?", "What is the center of the universe?", "What is the semen of the cosmic horse?", "What is the ultimate source of human speech?"; 1.164.34: "Who gave blood, soul, spirit to the earth?", "How could the unstructured universe give origin to this structured world?"; 1.164.5: "Where does the sun hide in the night?", "Where do gods live?"; 1.164.6: "What, where is the unborn support for the born universe?"; 1.164.20 (a hymn that is widely cited in the Upanishads as the parable of the Body and the Soul): "Two birds with fair wings, inseparable companions; Have found refuge in the same sheltering tree. One incessantly eats from the fig tree; the other, not eating, just looks on.".

== Reception in Hinduism ==
=== Shruti ===
The Vedas as a whole are classed as "shruti" in Hindu tradition. This has been compared to the concept of divine revelation in Western religious tradition, but Staal argues that "it is nowhere stated that the Veda was revealed", and that shruti simply means "that what is heard, in the sense that it is transmitted from father to son or from teacher to pupil". The Rigveda, or other Vedas, do not anywhere assert that they are apauruṣeyā, and this reverential term appears only centuries after the end of the Vedic period in the texts of the Mimamsa school of Hindu philosophy. The text of the Rigveda suggests it was "composed by poets, human individuals whose names were household words" in the Vedic age, states Staal.

The authors of the Brāhmana literature discussed and interpreted the Vedic ritual.

=== Sanskrit grammarians ===
Yaska (4th c. BCE), a lexicographer, was an early commentator of the Rigveda by discussing the meanings of difficult words. In his book titled Nirukta Yaska asserts that the Rigveda in the ancient tradition can be interpreted in three ways – from the perspective of religious rites (adhiyajna), from the perspective of the deities (adhidevata), and from the perspective of the soul (adhyatman). The fourth way to interpret the Rigveda also emerged in the ancient times, wherein the gods mentioned were viewed as symbolism for legendary individuals or narratives. It was generally accepted that creative poets often embed and express double meanings, ellipses and novel ideas to inspire the reader.

=== Medieval Hindu scholarship ===
By the period of Puranic Hinduism, in the medieval period, the language of the hymns had become "almost entirely unintelligible", and their interpretation mostly hinged on mystical ideas and sound symbolism.

According to the Puranic tradition, Ved Vyasa compiled all the four Vedas, along with the Mahabharata and the Puranas. Vyasa then taught the Rigveda samhita to Paila, who started the oral tradition. An alternate version states that Shakala compiled the Rigveda from the teachings of Vedic rishis, and one of the manuscript recensions mentions Shakala.

Madhvacharya, a Hindu philosopher of the 13th century, provided a commentary of the first 40 hymns of the Rigveda in his book Rig Bhashyam. (Note: See Rig Bhashyam.) In the 14th century, Sāyana wrote an exhaustive commentary on the complete text of the Rigveda in his book Rigveda Samhita. (Note: See Rigveda Samhita.) This book was translated from Sanskrit to English by Max Müller in the year 1856. H.H. Wilson also translated this book into English as Rigveda Sanhita in the year 1856. Sayanacharya studied at the Sringeri monastery.

A number of other commentaries (bhāṣyas) were written during the medieval period, including the commentaries by Skandasvamin (pre-Sayana, roughly of the Gupta period), Udgitha (pre-Sayana), Venkata-Madhava (pre-Sayana, c. 10th to 12th centuries) and Mudgala (after Sayana, an abbreviated version of Sayana's commentary).

Some notable commentaries from Medieval period include:

Title	Commentary	Year	Language	Notes
Rig Bhashyam	Madhvacharya	1285	Sanskrit	Commentary on the first 40 hymns of the Rigveda. The original book has been translated into English by Prof.K.T. Pandurangi accessible here
Rigveda Samhita	Sāyaṇācārya	1360	Sanskrit	Sāyaṇācārya, a Sanskrit scholar, wrote a treatise on the Vedas in the book Vedartha Prakasha (meaning "of Vedas made as a manifest"). The Rigveda Samhita is available here. This book was translated from Sanskrit to English by Max Müller in the year 1856. H. H. Wilson also translated this book into English as Rigveda Sanhita in the year 1856.

=== Arya Samaj and Aurobindo movements ===
In the 19th and early 20th centuries, reformers like Swami Dayananda Saraswati (founder of the Arya Samaj) and Sri Aurobindo (founder of Sri Aurobindo Ashram) discussed the philosophies of the Vedas. According to Robson, Dayananda believed "there were no errors in the Vedas (including the Rigveda), and if anyone showed him an error, he would maintain that it was a corruption added later".

According to Dayananda and Aurobindo the Vedic scholars had a monotheistic conception. Sri Aurobindo gave commentaries, general interpretation guidelines, and a partial translation in The secret of Veda (1946). (Note: See) Sri Aurobindo finds Sayana's interpretation to be ritualistic in nature, and too often having inconsistent interpretations of Vedic terms, trying to fit the meaning to a narrow mold. According to Aurobindo, if Sayana's interpretation were to be accepted, it would seem as if the Rig Veda belongs to an unquestioning tradition of faith, starting from an original error. Aurobindo attempted to interpret hymns to Agni in the Rigveda as mystical. Aurobindo states that the Vedic hymns were a quest after a higher truth, define the Rta (basis of Dharma), conceive life in terms of a struggle between the forces of light and darkness, and sought the ultimate reality.

=== Contemporary Hinduism ===
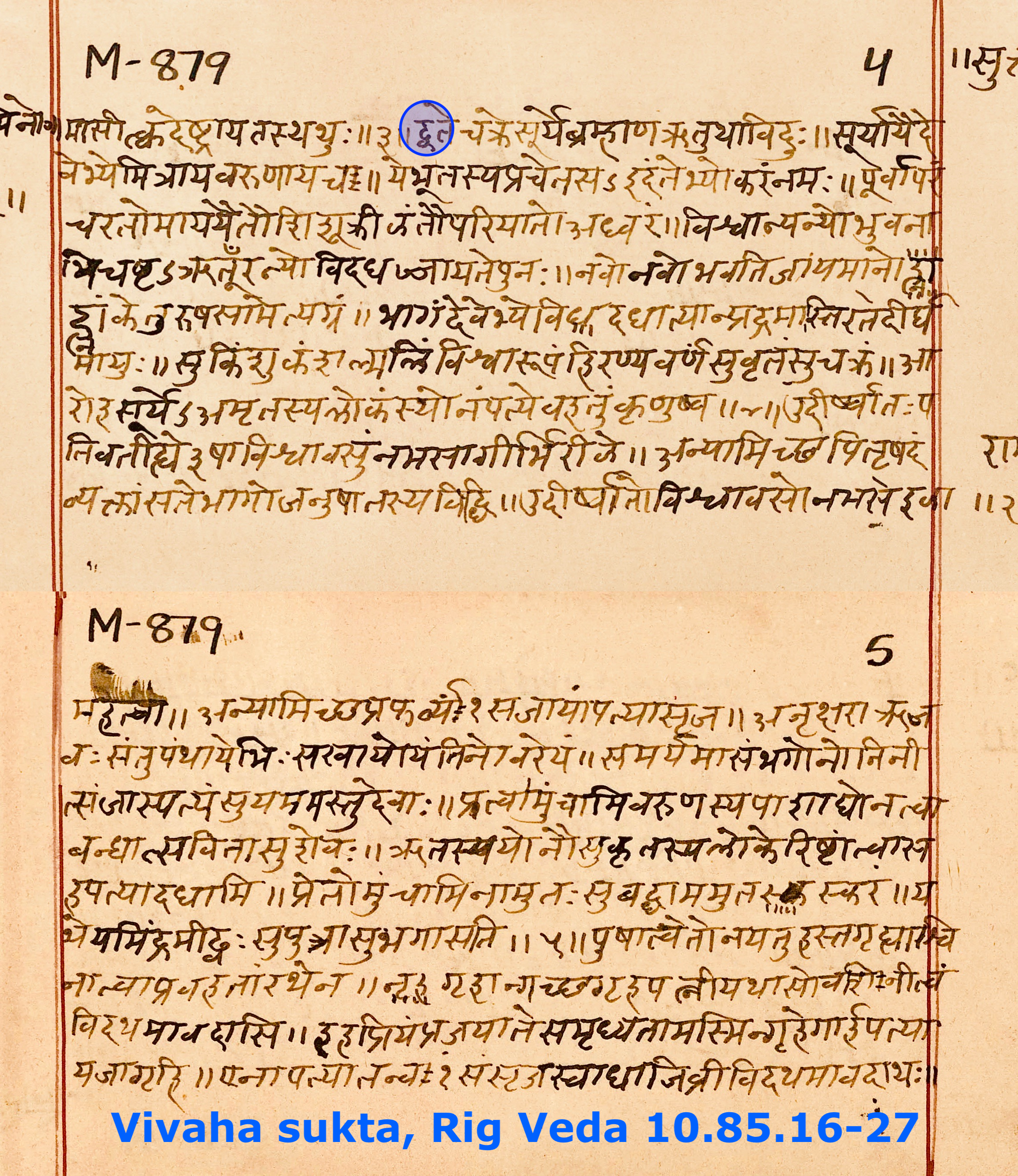
The hymn 10.85 of the Rigveda includes the Vivaha-sukta (above). Its recitation continues to be a part of Hindu wedding rituals.

The Rigveda, in contemporary Hinduism, has been a reminder of the ancient cultural heritage and point of pride for Hindus, with some hymns still in use in major rites of passage ceremonies, but the literal acceptance of most of the textual essence is long gone. Musicians and dance groups celebrate the text as a mark of Hindu heritage, through incorporating Rigvedic hymns in their compositions, such as in Hamsadhvani and Subhapantuvarali of Carnatic music, and these have remained popular among the Hindus for decades.

According to Axel Michaels, "most Indians today pay lip service to the Veda and have no regard for the contents of the text." According to Louis Renou, the Vedic texts are a distant object, and "even in the most orthodox domains, the reverence to the Vedas has come to be a simple raising of the hat". According to Andrea Pinkney, "the social history and context of the Vedic texts are extremely distant from contemporary Hindu religious beliefs and practice", and the reverence for the Vedas in contemporary Hinduism illustrates the respect among the Hindus for their heritage.

==== Hindu nationalism ====
The Rig Veda plays a role in the modern construction of a Hindu identity, portraying Hindus as the original inhabitants of India. The Rigveda has been referred to in the "Indigenous Aryans" and Out of India theory. Dating the Rig Veda as contemporaneous with (or even preceding) the Indus Valley civilisation, an argument is made that the IVC was Aryan, and the bearer of the Rig Veda. Indian nationalist Bal Gangadhar Tilak, in his Orion: Or Researches Into The Antiquity Of The Vedas (1893) has concluded that the date of composition of the Rigveda dates at least as far back as 6000–4000 BCE based on his astronomical research into the position of the constellation Orion. These theories are controversial, and not accepted or propagated in mainstream scholarship.

== Translations ==
The Rigveda is considered particularly difficult to translate, owing to its length, poetic nature, the language itself, and the absence of any close contemporary texts for comparison. Staal describes it as the most "obscure, distant and difficult for moderns to understand". As a result, he says, it "is often misinterpreted" – with many early translations containing straightforward errors – "or worse: used as a peg on which to hang an idea or a theory." Another issue is technical terms such as mandala, conventionally translated "book", but more literally rendered "cycle". Karen Thomson, author of a series of revisionary word studies and editor of the Metrically Restored Text Online at the University of Texas at Austin, argues, as linguists in the nineteenth century had done (Friedrich Max Müller, Rudolf von Roth, William Dwight Whitney, Theodor Benfey, John Muir, Edward Vernon Arnold), that the apparent obscurity derives from the failure to discard a mass of assumptions about ritual meaning inherited from Vedic tradition.

The first published translation of any portion of the Rigveda in any European language was into Latin, by Friedrich August Rosen, working from manuscripts brought back from India by Colebrooke. In 1849, Max Müller published his six-volume translation into German, the first printed edition and most studied. (Note: The birch bark text from which Müller produced his translation is held at the Bhandarkar Oriental Research Institute in Pune, India.) H. H. Wilson was the first to make a translation of the Rig Veda into English, published from 1850–88. Wilson's version was based on a commentary of the complete text by Sāyaṇa, a 14th-century Sanskrit scholar, which he also translated. (Note: See Rigveda Samhita.)

Translations have since been made in several languages, including French and Russian. Karl Friedrich Geldner completed the first scholarly translation into German in the 1920s, which was published after his death. Translations of shorter cherrypicked anthologies have also been published, such as those by Wendy Doniger in 1981 and Walter Maurer in 1986, although Jamison and Brereton say they "tend to create a distorted view" of the text. In 1994, Barend A. van Nooten and Gary B. Holland published the first attempt to restore the entirety of the Rigveda to its poetic form, systematically identifying and correcting sound changes and sandhi combinations which had distorted the original metre and meaning.

Translations of the Rigveda include:

Title	Commentary/Translation	Year	Language	Notes
Rigvedae specimen	Friedrich August Rosen	1830	Latin	Partial translation with 121 hymns (London, 1830). Also known as Rigveda Sanhita, Liber Primus, Sanskrite Et Latine (ISBN 978-1-275-45323-4). Based on manuscripts brought back from India by Henry Thomas Colebrooke.
Rig-Veda, oder die heiligen Lieder der Brahmanen	Max Müller	1849	German	Partial translation published by W. H. Allen and Co., London, and later F. A. Brockhaus, Leipzig. In 1873, Müller published an editio princeps titled The Hymns of the Rig-Veda in the Samhita Text. He also translated a few hymns in English (Nasadiya Sukta).
Ṛig-Veda-Sanhitā: A Collection of Ancient Hindu Hymns	H. H. Wilson	1850–88	English	Published as 6 volumes, by N. Trübner & Co., London.
Rig-véda, ou livre des hymnes	A. Langlois	1870	French	Partial translation. Re-printed in Paris, 1948–51 (ISBN 2-7200-1029-4).
Der Rigveda	Alfred Ludwig	1876	German	Published by Verlag von F. Tempsky, Prague.
Rig-Veda	Hermann Grassmann	1876	German	Published by F. A. Brockhaus, Leipzig
Rigved Bhashyam	Dayananda Saraswati	1877–9	Hindi	Incomplete translation. Later translated into English by Dharma Deva Vidya Martanda (1974).
The Hymns of the Rig Veda	Ralph T.H. Griffith	1889–92	English	Revised as The Rig Veda in 1896. Revised by J. L. Shastri in 1973. Griffith's philology was outdated even in the 19th century and questioned by scholars.
Der Rigveda in Auswahl	Karl Friedrich Geldner	1907	German	Published by Kohlhammer Verlag, Stuttgart. Geldner's 1907 work was a partial translation; he completed a full translation in the 1920s, which was published after his death, in 1951. This translation was titled Der Rig-Veda: aus dem Sanskrit ins Deutsche Übersetzt. Harvard Oriental Studies, vols. 33–37 (Cambridge, Massachusetts: 1951–7). Reprinted by Harvard University Press (2003) ISBN 0-674-01226-7.
Hymns from the Rigveda	A. A. Macdonell	1917	English	Partial translation (30 hymns). Published by Clarendon Press, Oxford.
Series of articles in Journal of the University of Bombay	Hari Damodar Velankar	1940s–1960s	English	Partial translation (Mandala 2, 5, 7 and 8). Later published as independent volumes.
Rig Veda – Hymns to the Mystic Fire	Sri Aurobindo	1946	English	Partial translation published by N. K. Gupta, Pondicherry. Later republished several times (ISBN 978-0-914955-22-1)
RigVeda Samhita	Pandit H.P. Venkat Rao, LaxmanAcharya and a couple of other Pandits	1947	Kannada	Sources from Saayana Bhashya, SkandaSvami Bhashya, Taittareya Samhita, Maitrayini Samhita and other Samhitas. The Kannada translation work was commissioned by Maharaja of Mysore Jayachama Rajendra Wodeyar. The translations were compiled into 11 volumes.
Rig Veda	Ramgovind Trivedi	1954	Hindi	
Études védiques et pāṇinéennes	Louis Renou	1955–69	French	Appears in a series of publications, organized by the deities. Covers most of the Rigveda, but leaves out significant hymns, including the ones dedicated to Indra and the Asvins.
ऋग्वेद संहिता	Shriram Sharma	1950s	Hindi	
Hymns from the Rig-Veda	Naoshiro Tsuji	1970	Japanese	Partial translation
Rigveda: Izbrannye Gimny	Tatyana Elizarenkova	1972	Russian	Partial translation, extended to a full translation published during 1989–1999.
Rigveda Parichaya	Nag Sharan Singh	1977	English / Hindi	Extension of Wilson's translation. Republished by Nag, Delhi in 1990 (ISBN 978-81-7081-217-3).
Rig Veda	M. R. Jambunathan	1978–80	Tamil	Two volumes, both released posthumously.
Rigvéda – Teremtéshimnuszok (Creation Hymns of the Rig-Veda)	Laszlo Forizs (hu)	1995	Hungarian	Partial translation published in Budapest (ISBN 963-85349-1-5)
The Rig Veda	Wendy Doniger O'Flaherty	1981	English	Partial translation (108 hymns), along with critical apparatus. Published by Penguin (ISBN 0-14-044989-2). A bibliography of translations of the Rig Veda appears as an Appendix.
Rigved Subodh Bhasya	Pandit Shripad Damodar Satwalekar	1985	Hindi, Marathi	Given meaning of each word/words, then gave the bhava-arth. Published by Swadhyay Mandal.
Pinnacles of India's Past: Selections from the Rgveda	Walter H. Maurer	1986	English	Partial translation published by John Benjamins.
The Rig Veda	Bibek Debroy, Dipavali Debroy	1992	English	Partial translation published by B. R. Publishing (ISBN 978-0-8364-2778-3). The work is in verse form, without reference to the original hymns or mandalas. Part of Great Epics of India: Veda series, also published as The Holy Vedas.
The Holy Vedas: A Golden Treasury	Pandit Satyakam Vidyalankar	1983	English	
Ṛgveda Saṃhitā	H. H. Wilson, Ravi Prakash Arya and K. L. Joshi	2001	English	4-volume set published by Parimal (ISBN 978-81-7110-138-2). Revised edition of Wilson's translation. Replaces obsolete English forms with more modern equivalents (e.g. "thou" with "you"). Includes the original Sanskrit text in Devanagari script, along with a critical apparatus.
Ṛgveda for the Layman	Shyam Ghosh	2002	English	Partial translation (100 hymns). Munshiram Manoharlal, New Delhi.
Rig-Veda	Michael Witzel, Toshifumi Goto	2007	German	Partial translation (Mandala 1 and 2). The authors are working on a second volume. Published by Verlag der Weltreligionen (ISBN 978-3-458-70001-2).
ऋग्वेद	Govind Chandra Pande	2008	Hindi	Partial translation (Mandala 3 and 5). Published by Lokbharti, Allahabad
The Hymns of Rig Veda	Tulsi Ram	2013	English	Published by Vijaykumar Govindram Hasanand, Delhi
The Rigveda	Stephanie W. Jamison and Joel P. Brereton	2014	English	3-volume set published by Oxford University Press (ISBN 978-0-19-937018-4). Funded by the United States' National Endowment for the Humanities in 2004.
Rigveda Samhita	Prasanna Chandra Gautam	2014, 2016	English, Hindi	Sanskrit Text with Word To Word Meaning and English Translation and Hindi Translation (with Mahesh Chandra Gautam). Also contains Essence of a verse.

== See also ==
- Atri's Eclipse
- Keśin – Ascetic wanderer with mystical powers described in the Vedic Sanskrit hymns
- Mayabheda – Sanskrit word meaning the breaching or removal of Avidya (ignorance)

== Bibliography ==
Editions

- The Rigveda: The Earliest Religious Poetry of India. Vol. 1–3. Translated by Stephanie W. Jamison; Joel P. Brereton. New York: Oxford University Press. 2014. ISBN 978-0-19-937018-4.
  - Stephanie W. Jamison (tr.); Joel P. Brereton (tr.) (2014). The Rigveda: The Earliest Religious Poetry of India. 3-volume set. Oxford University Press. ISBN 978-0-19-937018-4. Archived from the original on 7 September 2023.
  - Stephanie W. Jamison (tr.); Joel P. Brereton (tr.) (2014a). The Rigveda: The Earliest Religious Poetry of India. Vol. 1. Oxford University Press. ISBN 978-0-19-972078-1.
- editio princeps: Friedrich Max Müller, The Hymns of the Rigveda, with Sayana's commentary, London, 1849–75, 6 vols., 2nd ed. 4 vols., Oxford, 1890–92.
- Theodor Aufrecht, 2nd ed., Bonn, 1877.
- Sontakke, N. S. (1933). Rgveda-Samhitā: Śrimat-Sāyanāchārya virachita-bhāṣya-sametā. Sāyanachārya (commentary) (First ed.). Vaidika Samśodhana Maṇḍala.. The editorial board for the First Edition included N. S. Sontakke (Managing Editor), V. K. Rājvade, M. M. Vāsudevaśāstri, and T. S. Varadarājaśarmā.
- B. van Nooten und G. Holland, Rig Veda, a metrically restored text, Department of Sanskrit and Indian Studies, Harvard University, Harvard University Press, Cambridge, Massachusetts and London, England, 1994.
- Rgveda-Samhita, Text in Devanagari, English translation Notes and indices by H. H. Wilson, Ed. W. F. Webster, originally in 1888, Published Nag Publishers 1990, 11A/U.A. Jawaharnagar, Delhi-7.

Commentary

- Sayana (14th century)
  - ed. Müller 1849–75 (German translation);
  - ed. Müller (original commentary of Sāyana in Sanskrit based on 24 manuscripts).
  - ed. Sontakke et al., published by Vaidika Samsodhana Mandala, Pune (2nd ed. 1972) in 5 volumes.
- Rgveda-Samhitā Srimat-sāyanāchārya virachita-bhāṣya-sametā, ed. by Sontakke et al., published by Vaidika Samśodhana Mandala, Pune-9, 1972, in 5 volumes (It is original commentary of Sāyana in Sanskrit based on over 60 manuscripts).
- Sri Aurobindo (1998), The Secret of veda (PDF), Sri Aurobindo Ashram press, archived (PDF) from the original on 22 September 2020
- Sri Aurobindo, Hymns to the Mystic Fire (Commentary on the Rig Veda), Lotus Press, Twin Lakes, Wisconsin ISBN 0-914955-22-5 Rig Veda – Hymns to the Mystic Fire – Sri Aurobindo – INDEX Archived 6 April 2016 at the Wayback Machine
- Raimundo Pannikar (1972), The Vedic Experience, University of California Press

Philology

- Harold G. Coward (1990). The Philosophy of the Grammarians, in Encyclopedia of Indian Philosophies Volume 5 (Editor: Karl Potter). Princeton University Press. ISBN 978-81-208-0426-5.
- Vashishtha Narayan Jha, A Linguistic Analysis of the Rgveda-Padapatha Sri Satguru Publications, Delhi (1992).
- Bjorn Merker, Rig Veda Riddles In Nomad Perspective, Mongolian Studies, Journal of the Mongolian Society XI, 1988.
- Oberlies, Thomas (1998). Die Religion des Rgveda. Wien: Institut für Indologie der Universität Wien.
- Oldenberg, Hermann (1894). Hymnen des Rigveda. 1. Teil: Metrische und textgeschichtliche Prolegomena. Berlin 1888. (please add), Wiesbaden 1982.
- —Die Religion des Veda. Berlin 1894; Stuttgart 1917; Stuttgart 1927; Darmstadt 1977
- —Vedic Hymns, The Sacred Books of the East Vol l. 46 ed. Friedrich Max Müller, Oxford 1897
- Adolf Kaegi, The Rigveda: The Oldest Literature of the Indians (trans. R. Arrowsmith), Boston, Ginn and Co. (1886), 2004 reprint: ISBN 978-1-4179-8205-9.
- Mallory, J.P.; et al. (1997). Indo-Iranian Languages in Encyclopedia of Indo-European Culture. Fitzroy Dearborn.

Historical

- Anthony, David W. (2007), The Horse The Wheel And Language. How Bronze-Age Riders From the Eurasian Steppes Shaped The Modern World, Princeton University Press
- Avari, Burjor (2007), India: The Ancient Past, London: Routledge, ISBN 978-0-415-35616-9
- Bryant, Edwin (2001). The Quest for the Origins of Vedic Culture: The Indo-Aryan Migration Debate. Oxford: Oxford University Press. ISBN 978-0-19-513777-4.
- Dwyer, Rachel (2013), What Do Hindus Believe?, Granta Books, ISBN 978-1-84708-940-3
- Flood, Gavin D. (1996), An Introduction to Hinduism, Cambridge University Press
- George Erdosy (1995). The Indo-Aryans of Ancient South Asia: Language, Material Culture and Ethnicity. Walter de Gruyter. ISBN 978-3-11-014447-5.
- Hexam, Irving (2011), Understanding World Religions: An Interdisciplinary Approach, Wilfrid Laurier University Press, ISBN 978-0-310-31448-6
- Gregory Possehl; Michael Witzel (2002). "Vedic". In Peter N. Peregrine; Melvin Ember (eds.). Encyclopedia of Prehistory. Springer. ISBN 978-1-4684-7135-9.
- Lal, B.B. 2005. The Homeland of the Aryans. Evidence of Rigvedic Flora and Fauna & Archaeology, New Delhi, Aryan Books International.
- Talageri, Shrikant: The Rigveda: A Historical Analysis, 2000. ISBN 81-7742-010-0
- Witzel, Michael (1995), "Early Sanskritization: Origin and Development of the Kuru state" (PDF), EJVS, vol. 1, no. 4, archived from the original (PDF) on 20 February 2012
- Witzel, Michael (1997), "The Development of the Vedic Canon and its Schools: The Social and Political Milieu" (PDF), in Michael Witzel (ed.), Inside the Texts, Beyond the Texts: New Approaches to the Study of the Vedas, Harvard Oriental Series, Opera Minora, vol. 2, Cambridge: Harvard University Press, pp. 257–348, archived (PDF) from the original on 4 August 2020
- Witzel, Michael (2003). "Vedas and Upanisads". In Flood, Gavin (ed.). The Blackwell Companion to Hinduism. Blackwell Publishing. ISBN 978-0-631-21535-6.
- Witzel, Michael (2019). "Beyond the Flight of the Falcon". In Thapar, Romila (ed.). Which of Us are Aryans?: Rethinking the Concept of Our Origins. Aleph. ISBN 978-93-88292-38-2.
- Wood, Michael (2007), The Story of India Hardcover, BBC Worldwide, ISBN 978-0-563-53915-5
