= Vāc =

Vedic goddess of speech

Vac (Sanskrit: वाच्, vāc) is a Vedic goddess who is a personified form of divine speech. She enters into the inspired poets and visionaries, gives expression and energy to those she loves; she is called the "mother of the Vedas" and consort of Prajapati, the Vedic embodiment of mind. She is also associated with Indra in Aitareya Aranyaka. Elsewhere, such as in the Padma Purana, she is stated to be the wife of Vision (Kashyapa), the mother of Emotions, and the friend of Musicians (Gandharva).

She is identified with goddess Saraswati in later Vedic literature and post-Vedic texts of Hindu traditions. Saraswati has remained a significant and revered deity in Hinduism.

Throughout the Rigvedic era mention of vak is more related to speech, control over the pronunciation of Vedic texts and Hymns, Vedic hymns.

In Rigveda vac is mentioned nearly 130 times in which she has been specifically mentioned in 4 verses and 100 combined invocation with other deities.the invocations of goddess Vac and the area of her divine purview treatment in 'Appendix E: Philosophy and Grammar' to his magnum opus The Shape of Ancient Thought.

== See also ==
- Hindu deities
- Rigvedic deities
- Śabda
- Indra
