= Maruts =

Ancient Hindu storm deities

- Gods of Thunderstorms
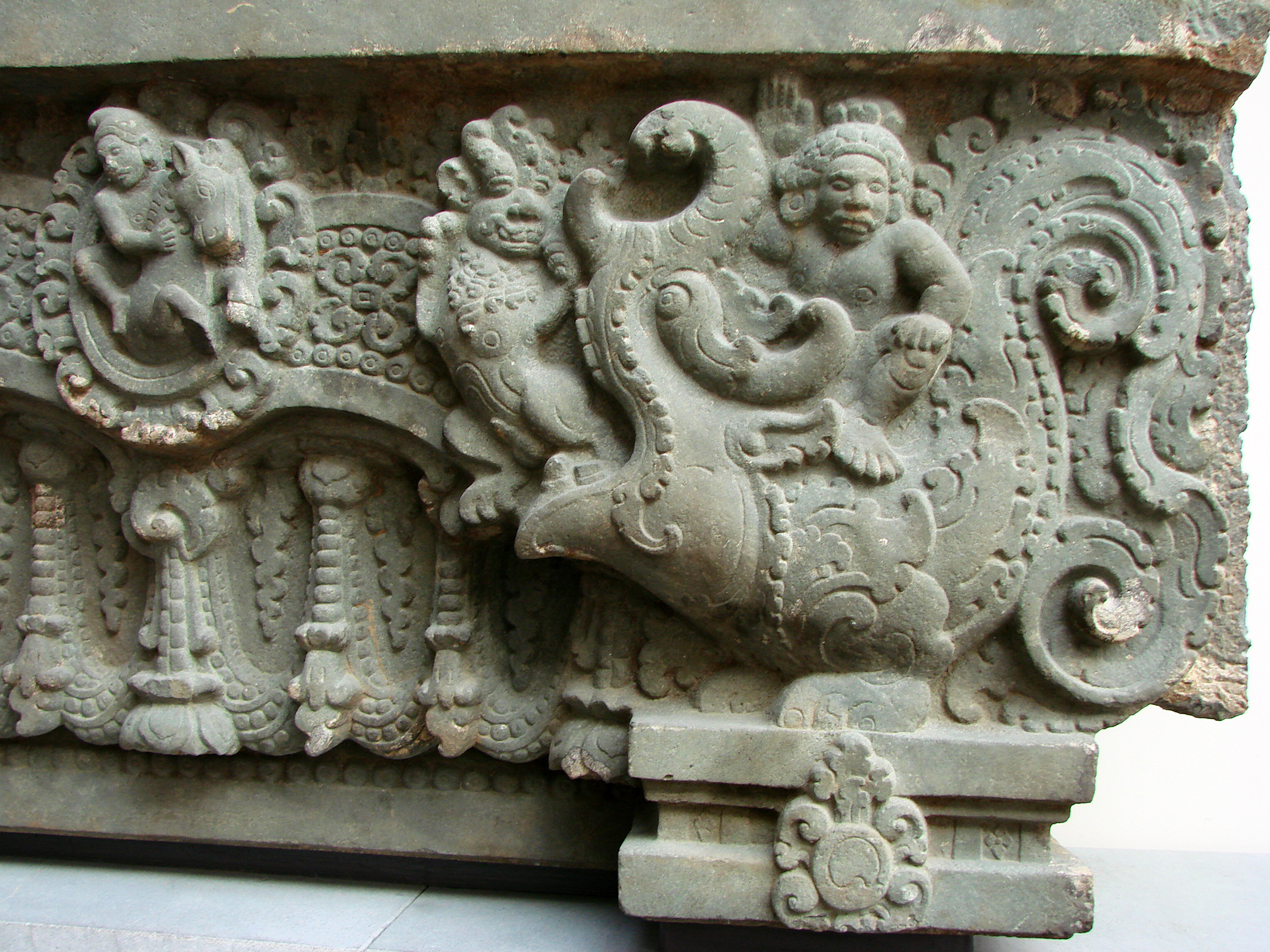
- A seventh century Marut detail on a lintel excavated at Sambor Prei Kuk, Kampong Thom Province, Cambodia
- Abode: Midspace
- Weapon: Lightning & Many others
- Parents: Vedic: Rudra and Pṛśni; Puranic: Kashyapa and Diti
- Consort: Rodasī

In Hinduism, the Maruts (/məˈrʊts/; Sanskrit: मरुत् , IPA: [mɐrut̪], more common in the plural Sanskrit: मरुतः, marutaḥ, Sanskrit pronunciation: [mɐrut̪ɐh]), also known as the Marutagana and sometimes identified with Rudras, are storm deities and sons of Rudra and Prisni. The number of Maruts varies from 27 to sixty (three times sixty in RV 8.96.8). They are very violent and aggressive, described as armed with golden weapons i.e. lightning and thunderbolts, as having iron teeth and roaring like lions, as residing in the northwest, as riding in golden chariots drawn by ruddy horses.

In the Vedic mythology, the Maruts act as Indra's companions as a troop of young warriors. According to French comparative mythologist Georges Dumézil, they are cognate to the Einherjar and the Wild hunt.

== In Scriptures ==
Hymn 66 of Mandala VI of the Rig Veda, the ancient collection of sacred hymns, is an eloquent account of how a natural phenomenon of a rain-storm metamorphoses into storm deities.

According to the Rig Veda they wore golden helmets and breastplates, and used their axes to split the clouds so that rain may fall. They were capable of causing the mountains to tremble. Though they were the offspring of Rudra, they were previously considered by Indra, The main chieftain of heaven, who was entitled as Marutvant ("Accompanied by the Maruts"). They are also accompanied by a female deity, Rodasi, who rides with them through the heavens. She is variously described as their mother and wife of Rudra, standing on the clouds that are the Maruts' chariot, or their collective wife and beloved, who symbolizes lightning.

The Maruts assist The King of heaven Indra, to defeat Vritra, lending him their power. The myth continues with Indra disputing them their role on the battle, accusing them of having abandoned him after giving him encouragement before the fight, and they quarrel for the sacrifice given by the sage Agastya. However, their place to his side in mythology is accepted, appearing elsewhere with him.

According to later tradition, such as Puranas, the Maruts were born from the broken womb of the goddess Diti, after Indra hurled a thunderbolt at her to prevent her from giving birth to a powerful son. The goddess had intended to remain pregnant for a century before giving birth to a son who would threaten Indra.

== See also ==
- Ashvins
