= Mandala 1 =

First book of the Rigveda

The first Mandala ("book") of the Rigveda has 191 hymns. Together with Mandala 10, it forms the latest part of the Rigveda. Its composition likely dates to the late Vedic period (1000-500 BCE) or the Early Iron Age (around 1000 BCE).

== Contents ==
Hymn 1.1 is addressed to Agni, arranged so that the name of this god is the first word of the Rigveda. The remaining hymns are mainly addressed to Agni and Indra. Hymns 1.154 to 1.156 are addressed to Vishnu. Hymn 1.3 is dedicated to the Ashvins. Hymn 1.164.46, part of a hymn to the Vishvadevas, is often quoted as an example of emerging monism or monotheism. It forms the basis for the well-known statement "Truth is one, sages call it by various names":

índram mitráṃ váruṇam agním āhur / átho divyáḥ sá suparṇó garútmān
ékaṃ sád víprā bahudhâ vadanty / agníṃ yamám mātaríśvānam āhuḥ
"They call him Indra, Mitra, Varuna, Agni / and he is heavenly nobly-winged Garutman."
"To what is One, sages give many a title / they call it Agni, Yama, Matarisvan." (trans. Griffith)
– Rigveda 1.164.46

== Interpretation ==
Max Muller described the character of the Vedic hymns as a form of henotheism, in which "numerous deities are successively praised as if they were one ultimate God." According to Graham, in the Vedic society it was believed that humans could contact the gods through the spoken utterances of the Vedic seers, and "the One Real" (ekam sat) in 1.164.46 refers to Vāc, both "speech" and goddess of speech, the "one ultimate, supreme God", and "one supreme Goddess." In later Vedic literature, "Speech or utterance is also identified with the supreme power or transcendent reality," and "equated with Brahman in this sense." Frauwallner states that "many gods are traced back to the one Godhead. The one (ekam) is not meant adjectively as a quality but as a substantive, as the upholding centre of reality."

The Vedic henotheism may have grown out of a growing recognition of a "unitary essence beyond all the deities," in which the deities were conceptualized as pluralistic manifestations of the same divine essence beyond this plurality. The Vedic era conceptualization of the divine or the One, states Jeaneane Fowler, is more abstract than a monotheistic God, it is the Reality behind the phenomenal universe, which it treats as "limitless, indescribable, absolute principle", thus the Vedic divine is something of a panentheism. In late Vedic era, with the start of Upanishadic age (~800-600 BCE), from the henotheistic, panentheistic concepts emerge the concepts which scholars variously call nondualism or monism, as well as forms of non-theism.

== Selected hymns ==
Sukta	Name	Deity	Rishi	Metre	Incipit
1.1	Agni-Sukta	Agni	Madhushchandhas Vaishvamitra	gayatri	agním īḷe puróhitaṃ
1.22	Vishnu-Sukta	Vishnu	Medhatithi Kanva	gayatri	prātaryújā ví bodhaya
1.32	Indra-Sukta	Indra	Hiranyastupa Angiras	trishtubh	índrasya nú vīríyāṇi prá vocaṃ
1.89	Shanti-Sukta	Vishvedevas	Gotama Rahugana	jagati (trishtubh)	â no bhadrâḥ krátavo yantu viśváto
1.90	Madhu-Sukta	Vishvedevas	Gotama Rahugana	gayatri (anushtubh)	ṛjunītî no váruṇo
1.99	Agni-Durga-Sukta	Agni	Kashyapa Marica	trishtubh	jātávedase sunavāma sómam
1.162	Ashvamedha-Sukta	The Horse	Dīrghatamas Aucathya	(trishtubh)	mâ no mitró váruṇo aryamâyúr

== Publications ==
The editio princeps of the book is due to Friedrich August Rosen, published posthumously in 1838. It was the earliest edition of a Rigvedic Mandala, predating Max Müller's edition of the entire Rigveda by more than 50 years.

== Sources ==
- Frauwallner, Erich (1973), History of Indian Philosophy: The philosophy of the Veda and of the epic. The Buddha and the Jina. The Sāmkhya and the classical Yoga-system, Motilall Banarsidas
- Graham, William A. (1993), Beyond the Written Word: Oral Aspects of Scripture in the History of Religion, Cambridge University Press, ISBN 978-0-521-44820-8
- Taliaferro, Charles; Harrison, Victoria S.; Goetz, Stewart (2012), The Routledge Companion to Theism, Routledge, ISBN 978-1-136-33823-6
