= Mitra–Varuna =

Two Gods of Hinduism

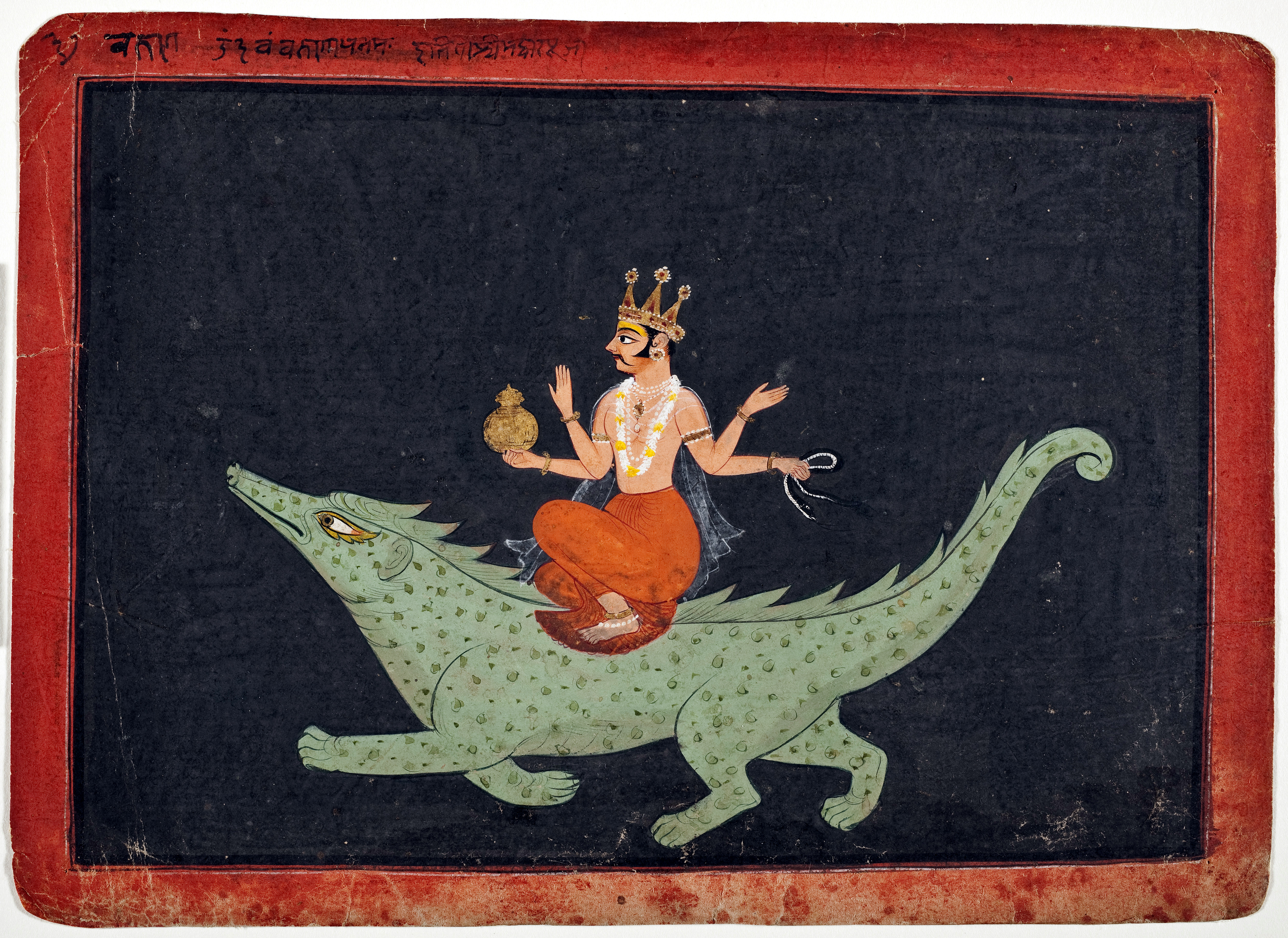
Varuna Deva

Mitra and Varuna (Sanskrit: mitrā́váruṇā) are two deities frequently referred to in the ancient Indian scripture of the Rigveda. They are both considered Ādityas, meaning sons of Aditi; and they are protectors of the righteous order of Ṛta. Their connection is so close that they are frequently linked in the dvandva compound Mitra–Varuna.

Mitra-Varuna is also the title of a 1940 book in Proto-Indo-European mythology by Georges Dumézil.

== See also ==
- Mitra (Hindu god)
- Varuna
