= Vedic chant =

Oral tradition of the Vedas

The oral tradition of the Vedas (Śruti) consists of several pathas, "recitations" or ways of chanting the Vedic mantras. Such traditions of Vedic chant are often considered the oldest unbroken oral tradition in existence, the fixation of the Vedic texts (samhitas) as preserved dating to roughly the time of Homer (early Iron Age or 800 BC).

UNESCO proclaimed the tradition of Vedic chant a Masterpiece of the Oral and Intangible Heritage of Humanity on November 7, 2008.^{[a]}

== Tones ==
Vedic chantings use 4 tones – udātta उदात्त (middle tone), anudātta अनुदात्त (lower tone), svarita स्वरित (higher tone) and dīrgha svarita दीर्घस्वरित (high tone extended). These are usually marked with intuitive svara marks – an underline for anudātta (अ॒), a small vertical line above the letter for svarita (अ॑) and two vertical lines for dīrgha svarita (आ᳚).

== Pathas ==
The various pathas or recitation styles are designed to allow the complete and perfect memorization of the text and its pronunciation, including the Vedic pitch accent. Eleven such ways of reciting the Vedas were designed – Samhita, Pada, Krama, Jata, Maalaa, Sikha, Rekha, Dhwaja, Danda, Rathaa, Ghana, of which Ghana is usually considered the most difficult.

The students are first taught to memorize the Vedas using simpler methods like continuous recitation (samhitapatha), word by word recitation (pada patha) in which compounds (sandhi) are dissolved and krama patha (words are arranged in the pattern of ab bc cd ...); before teaching them the eight complex recitation styles.

A pathin is a scholar who has mastered the pathas. Thus, a ghanapaathin has learnt the chanting of the scripture up to the advanced stage of ghana. The Ghanapatha or the "Bell" mode of chanting is so called because the words are repeated back and forth in a bell shape. The sonority natural to Vedic chanting is enhanced in Ghana. In Jatapatha, the words are braided together, so to speak, and recited back and forth.

The samhita, pada and krama pathas can be described as the natural recitation styles or prakrutipathas. The remaining eight modes of chanting are classified as complex recitation styles or Vikrutipathas as they involve reversing of the word order. The backward chanting of words does not alter the meanings in the Vedic (Sanskrit) language.

== Oral transmission ==
Prodigious energy was expended by ancient Indian culture in ensuring that these texts were transmitted from generation to generation with inordinate fidelity. Many forms of recitation or pathas were designed to aid accuracy in recitation and the transmission of the Vedas and other knowledge texts from one generation to the next. All hymns in each Veda were recited in this way; for example, all 1,028 hymns with 10,600 verses of the Rigveda was preserved in this way. Each text was recited in a number of ways, to ensure that the different methods of recitation acted as a cross check on the other. Pierre-Sylvain Filliozat summarizes this as follows:

- Samhita-patha: continuous recitation of Sanskrit words bound by the phonetic rules of euphonic combination;
- Pada-patha: a recitation marked by a conscious pause after every word, and after any special grammatical codes embedded inside the text; this method suppresses euphonic combination and restores each word in its original intended form;
- Krama-patha: a step-by-step recitation where euphonically-combined words are paired successively and sequentially and then recited; for example, a hymn "word1 word2 word3 word4 ...", would be recited as "word1word2 word2word3 word3word4 ..."; this method to verify accuracy is credited to Vedic sages Gargya and Sakalya in the Hindu tradition and mentioned by the ancient Sanskrit grammarian Pāṇini (dated to pre-Buddhism period);
- Krama-patha modified: the same step-by-step recitation as above, but without euphonic-combinations (or free form of each word); this method to verify accuracy is credited to Vedic sages Babhravya and Galava in the Hindu tradition, and is also mentioned by the ancient Sanskrit grammarian Panini;
- Jata-pāṭha, dhvaja-pāṭha and ghana-pāṭha are methods of recitation of a text and its oral transmission that developed after 5th century BCE, that is after the start of Buddhism and Jainism; these methods use more complicated rules of combination and were less used.

These extraordinary retention techniques guaranteed the most perfect canon not just in terms of unaltered word order but also in terms of sound. That these methods have been effective, is testified to by the preservation of the most ancient Indian religious text, the Ṛgveda (c. 1500 BCE).

Example of a text with nine words in different pāṭhas is set out below:

Name	Example	Remarks
jaṭā जटा జట ಜಟ ജഠാ	1 2 2 1 1 2 ~ 2 3 3 2 2 3 ~ 3 4 4 3 3 4 ~ 4 5 5 4 4 5 ~ 5 6 6 5 5 6 ~ 6 7 7 6 6 7 ~ 7 8 8 7 7 8 ~ 8 9 9 8 8 9 ~ 9 _ _ 9 9 _ ~	I+1 I+2 I+2 I+1 I+1 I+2
mālā माला మాల ಮಾಲಾ മാലാ	1 2 ~ 2 1 ~ 1 2 ~ 2 3 ~ 3 2 ~ 2 3 ~ 3 4 ~ 4 3 ~ 3 4 ~ 4 5 ~ 5 4 ~ 4 5 ~ 5 6 ~ 6 5 ~ 5 6 ~ 6 7 ~ 7 6 ~ 6 7 ~ 7 8 ~ 8 7 ~ 7 8 ~ 8 9 ~ 9 8 ~ 8 9 ~ 9 _ ~ _ 9 ~ 9 _ ~	I+1 I+2 ~ I+2 I+1 ~ I+1 I+2
śikhā शिखा శిఖ ಶಿಖಾ ശിഖാ	1 2 ~ 2 1 ~ 1 2 3 ~ 2 3 ~ 3 2 ~ 2 3 4 ~ 3 4 ~ 4 3 ~ 3 4 5 ~ 4 5 ~ 5 4 ~ 4 5 6 ~ 5 6 ~ 6 5 ~ 5 6 7 ~ 6 7 ~ 7 6 ~ 6 7 8 ~ 7 8 ~ 8 7 ~ 7 8 9 ~ 8 9 ~ 9 8 ~ 8 9 _ ~ 9 _ ~ _ 9 ~ 9 _ _ ~	I+1 I+2 ~ I+2 I+1 ~ I+1 I+2 I+3
rekhā रेखा రేఖ ರೇಖಾ രേഖാ	1 2 ~ 2 1 ~ 1 2 ~ 2 3 4 ~ 4 3 2 ~ 2 3 ~ 3 4 5 6 ~ 6 5 4 3 ~ 3 4 ~ 4 5 6 7 8 ~ 8 7 6 5 4 ~ 4 5 ~ 5 6 7 8 9 ~ 9 8 7 6 5 ~ 5 6 ~ 6 7 8 9 ~ 9 8 7 6 ~ 6 7 ~ 7 8 9 ~ 9 8 7 ~ 7 8 ~ 8 9 ~ 9 8 ~ 8 9 ~ 9 ~ 9 ~ 9 _ ~	I...I+I ~ I+I...I ~ I I+1
dhvaja ध्वज ధ్వజ ಧ್ವಜ ധ്വജ	1 2 ~ 8 9 ~ 2 3 ~ 7 8 ~ 3 4 ~ 6 7 ~ 4 5 ~ 5 6 ~ 5 6 ~ 4 5 ~ 6 7 ~ 3 4 ~ 7 8 ~ 2 3 ~ 8 9 ~ 1 2 ~ 9 _ ~ _ 1 ~	I I+1 ~ N-I-1 N-I
daṇḍa दण्ड దండ ದಂಡ ദണ്ഡ	1 2 ~ 2 1 ~ 1 2 ~ 2 3 ~ 3 2 1 ~ 1 2 ~ 2 3 ~ 3 4 ~ 4 3 2 1 ~ 1 2 ~ 2 3 ~ 3 2 ~ 2 3 ~ 3 4 ~ 4 3 2 ~ 2 3 ~ 3 4 ~ 4 5 ~ 5 4 3 2 ~ 2 3 ~ 3 4 ~ 4 3 ~ 3 4 ~ 4 5 ~ 5 4 3 ~ 3 4 ~ 4 5 ~ 5 6 ~ 6 5 4 3 ~ 3 4 ~ 4 5 ~ 5 4 ~ 4 5 ~ 5 6 ~ 6 5 4 ~ 4 5 ~ 5 6 ~ 6 7 ~ 7 6 5 4 ~ 4 5 ~ 5 6 ~ 6 5 ~ 5 6 ~ 6 7 ~ 7 6 5 ~ 5 6 ~ 6 7 ~ 7 8 ~ 8 7 6 5 ~ 5 6 ~ 6 7 ~ 7 6 ~ 6 7 ~ 7 8 ~ 8 7 6 ~ 6 7 ~ 7 8 ~ 8 9 ~ 9 8 7 6 ~ 6 7 ~ 7 8 ~ 8 7 ~ 7 8 ~ 8 9 ~ 9 8 7 ~ 7 8 ~ 8 9 ~ 9 _ ~ _ 9 8 7 ~ 7 8 ~ 8 9 ~ 9 8 ~ 8 9 ~ 9 _ ~ _ 9 8 ~ 8 9 ~ 9 _ ~ _ _ ~ _ _ 9 8 ~ 8 9 ~ 9 _ ~ _ 9 ~ 9 _ ~ _ _ ~ _ _ 9 ~ 9 _ ~ _ _ ~ _ _ ~ _ _ _ 9 ~ 9 _ ~	I+1 I+2 ~ I+2 I+1 ~ I+1 I+2 ~ I+2 I+3 ~ I+3 I+2 I+1 ~ I+1 I+2 ~ I+2 I+3 ~ I+3 I+4 ~ I+4 I+3 I+2 I+1 ~ I+1 I+2
ratha रथ రధ ರಥ രഥ	1 2 ~ 5 6 ~ 2 1 ~ 6 5 ~ 1 2 ~ 5 6 ~ 2 3 ~ 6 7 ~ 3 2 1 ~ 7 6 5 ~ 1 2 ~ 5 6 ~ 2 3 ~ 6 7 ~ 3 4 ~ 7 8 ~ 4 3 2 1 ~ 8 7 6 5 ~ 1 2 ~ 5 6 ~ 2 3 ~ 6 7 ~ 3 4 ~ 7 8 ~ 4 5 ~ 8 9 ~ 5 4 3 2 1 ~ 9 8 7 6 5 ~ 1 2 ~ 5 6 ~ 2 3 ~ 6 7 ~ 3 4 ~ 7 8 ~ 4 5 ~ 8 9 ~ 5 6 ~ 9 _ ~ 6 5 4 3 2 1 ~ 9 8 7 6 5 ~ 1 2 ~ 5 6 ~ 2 3 ~ 6 7 ~ 3 4 ~ 7 8 ~ 4 5 ~ 8 9 ~ 5 6 ~ 9 _ ~ 6 7 ~ _ _ ~ 7 6 5 4 3 2 1 ~ 9 8 7 6 5 ~ 1 2 ~ 5 6 ~ 2 3 ~ 6 7 ~ 3 4 ~ 7 8 ~ 4 5 ~ 8 9 ~ 5 6 ~ 9 _ ~ 6 7 ~ _ _ ~ 7 8 ~ _ _ ~ 8 7 6 5 4 3 2 1 ~ 9 8 7 6 5 ~ 1 2 ~ 5 6 ~ 2 3 ~ 6 7 ~ 3 4 ~ 7 8 ~ 4 5 ~ 8 9 ~ 5 6 ~ 9 _ ~ 6 7 ~ _ _ ~ 7 8 ~ _ _ ~ 8 9 ~ _ _ ~ 9 8 7 6 5 4 3 2 1 ~ 9 8 7 6 5 ~ 1 2 ~ 5 6 ~ 2 3 ~ 6 7 ~ 3 4 ~ 7 8 ~ 4 5 ~ 8 9 ~ 5 6 ~ 9 _ ~ 6 7 ~ _ _ ~ 7 8 ~ _ _ ~ 8 9 ~ _ _ ~ 9 _ ~ _ _ ~ 9 8 7 6 5 4 3 2 1 ~ 9 8 7 6 5 ~ 1 2 ~ 5 6 ~ 2 3 ~ 6 7 ~ 3 4 ~ 7 8 ~ 4 5 ~ 8 9 ~ 5 6 ~ 9 _ ~ 6 7 ~ _ _ ~ 7 8 ~ _ _ ~ 8 9 ~ _ _ ~ 9 _ ~ _ _ ~	I I+1 / I+4 I+5 / I+1 ...1 / I+5...(-I items ) : One Index FOR J 1...I J J+1 / J+4 J+5 : One Index LOOP
Ghana घन ఘన ಘನ ഘന	1 2 2 1 1 2 3 3 2 1 1 2 3 ~ 2 3 3 2 2 3 4 4 3 2 2 3 4 ~ 3 4 4 3 3 4 5 5 4 3 3 4 5 ~ 4 5 5 4 4 5 6 6 5 4 4 5 6 ~ 5 6 6 5 5 6 7 7 6 5 5 6 7 ~ 6 7 7 6 6 7 8 8 7 6 6 7 8 ~ 7 8 8 7 7 8 9 9 8 7 7 8 9 ~ 8 9 9 8 8 9 _ _ 9 8 8 9 _ ~ 9 _ _ 9 9 _ _ _ _ 9 9 _ _ ~	I+1 I+2 I+2 I+1 I+1 I+2 I+3 I+3 I+2 I+1 I+1 I+2 I+3

== Divine sound ==
The insistence on preserving pronunciation and accent as accurately as possible is related to the belief that the potency of the mantras lies in their sound when pronounced. The shakhas thus have the purpose of preserving knowledge of uttering divine sound originally cognized by the rishis.

Portions of the Vedantic literature elucidate the use of sound as a spiritual tool. They assert that the entire cosmic creation began with sound: "By His utterance came the universe." (Brihadaranyaka Upanishad 1.2.4). The Vedanta-sutras add that ultimate liberation comes from sound as well (anavrittih shabdat).

Katyayana likens speech to the supreme Brahman. He uses the Rigvedic verse – "Four are its horns, three its feet, two its heads, and seven its hands, roars loudly the threefold-bound bull, the great god enters mortals" (Rig-Veda, iv. 58, 3), to assert this claim. Katyayana explains that in the verse, the "four horns" are the four kinds of words i.e. nouns, verbs, prepositions, and particles; its "three feet" mean the three tenses, past, present and future; the "two heads" imply the eternal and temporary words, distinguished as the "manifested" and the "manifester"; its "seven hands" are the seven case affixes; "threefold bound" is enclosed in the three organs the chest, the throat, and the head; the metaphor "bull" (vrishabha) is used to imply that it gives fruit when used with knowledge; "loudly roars" signifies uttering sound, speech or language; and in "the great god enters mortals" entails that the "great god" speech, enters the mortals. Thus, primal sound is often referred to as Shabda Brahman or "word as The Absolute". Maitri Upanishad states:

He who is well versed in the Word-Brahman, attains to the Supreme Brahman. (VI.22)

Mantras, or sacred sounds, are used to pierce through sensual, mental and intellectual levels of existence (all lower strata of consciousness) for the purpose of purification and spiritual enlightenment. "By sound vibration one becomes liberated" (Vedanta-sutra 4.22).

== See also ==
- Brahma Samhita
- Interpretations of Vedic Mantras
- Shrauta
- Svādhyāya

== Notes ==
a. Wayne Howard noted in the preface of his book, Veda Recitation in Varanasi, "The four Vedas (Rig, Yajur, Sama and Atharva) are not 'books' in the usual sense, though within the past hundred years each veda has appeared in several printed editions. They comprise rather tonally accented verses and hypnotic, abstruse melodies whose proper realizations demand oral instead of visual transmission. They are robbed of their essence when transferred to paper, for without the human element the innumerable nuances and fine intonations – inseparable and necessary components of all four compilations – are lost completely. The ultimate authority in Vedic matters is never the printed page but rather the few members – who are today keeping the centuries-old traditions alive."
