= Mandala 5 =

Fifth book of the Rigveda

The fifth Mandala of the Rigveda has 87 hymns. Most hymns in this book are attributed to the Atri family. The mandala is one of the "family books" (mandalas 2-7), the oldest core of the Rigveda, which were composed in early vedic period(1500-1000 BCE).

The hymns are dedicated mainly to Agni and Indra, the Visvadevas, the Maruts, the twin-deity Mitra-Varuna and the Asvins. Two hymns each are dedicated to Ushas (the dawn) and to Savitar, one each to the Apris, Parjanya (rain), Prthivi (the Earth) and Varuna. 5.40 addresses Surya and Atri besides Indra.

== List of incipits ==
The dedication as given by Griffith is in square brackets

5.1 (355) [Agni.] ábodhi agníḥ samídhā jánānām
5.2 (356) [Agni.] kumārám mātâ yuvatíḥ sámubdhaṃ
5.3 (357) [Agni.] tuvám agne váruṇo jâyase yát
5.4 (358) [Agni.] tuvâm agne vásupatiṃ vásūnām
5.5 (359) [Apris.] súsamiddhāya śocíṣe
5.6 (360) [Agni.] agníṃ tám manye yó vásur
5.7 (361) [Agni.] sákhāyaḥ sáṃ vaḥ samyáñcam
5.8 (362) [Agni.] tuvâm agna ṛtāyávaḥ sám īdhire
5.9 (363) [Agni.] tuvâm agne havíṣmanto
5.10 (364) [Agni.] ágna ójiṣṭham â bhara
5.11 (365) [Agni.] jánasya gopâ ajaniṣṭa jâgṛvir
5.12 (366) [Agni.] prá agnáye bṛhaté yajñíyāya
5.13 (367) [Agni.] árcantas tvā havāmahe
5.14 (368) [Agni.] agníṃ stómena bodhaya
5.15 (369) [Agni.] prá vedháse kaváye védiyāya
5.16 (370) [Agni.] bṛhád váyo hí bhānáve
5.17 (371) [Agni.] â yajñaír deva mártiya
5.18 (372) [Agni.] prātár agníḥ purupriyó
5.19 (373) [Agni.] abhy àvasthâḥ prá jāyante
5.20 (374) [Agni.] yám agne vājasātama
5.21 (375) [Agni.] manuṣvát tvā ní dhīmahi
5.22 (376) [Agni.] prá viśvasāman atrivád
5.23 (377) [Agni.] ágne sáhantam â bhara
5.24 (378) [Agni.] ágne tuváṃ no ántama
5.25 (379) [Agni.] áchā vo agním ávase
5.26 (380) [Agni.] ágne pavāka rocíṣā
5.27 (381) [Agni.] ánasvantā sátpatir māmahe me
5.28 (382) [Agni.] sámiddho agnír diví śocír aśret
5.29 (383) [Agni.] trí aryamâ mánuṣo devátātā
5.30 (384) [Indra.] kúva syá vīráḥ kó apaśyad índraṃ
5.31 (385) [Indra.] índro ráthāya pravátaṃ kṛṇoti
5.32 (386) [Indra.] ádardar útsam ásṛjo ví khâni
5.33 (387) [Indra.] máhi mahé taváse dīdhiye nřn
5.34 (388) [Indra.] ájātaśatrum ajárā súvarvatī
5.35 (389) [Indra.] yás te sâdhiṣṭho ávasa
5.36 (390) [Indra.] sá â gamad índaro yó vásūnāṃ
5.37 (391) [Indra.] sám bhānúnā yatate sûriyasya
5.38 (392) [Indra.] uróṣ ṭa indra râdhaso
5.39 (393) [Indra.] yád indra citra mehánā
5.40 (394) [Indra. Surya. Atri.] â yāhi ádribhiḥ sutáṃ
5.41 (395) [Visvedevas.] kó nú vām mitrāvaruṇāv ṛtāyán
5.42 (396) [Visvedevas.] prá śáṃtamā váruṇaṃ dîdhitī gîr
5.43 (397) [Visvedevas.] â dhenávaḥ páyasā tûrṇiarthā
5.44 (398) [Visvedevas.] tám pratnáthā pūrváthā viśváthemáthā
5.45 (399) [Visvedevas.] vidâ divó viṣiyánn ádrim ukthaír
5.46 (400) [Visvedevas.] háyo ná vidvâṁ ayuji svayáṃ dhurí
5.47 (401) [Visvedevas.] prayuñjatî divá eti bruvāṇâ
5.48 (402) [Visvedevas.] kád u priyâya dhâmane manāmahe
5.49 (403) [Visvedevas.] deváṃ vo adyá savitâram éṣe
5.50 (404) [Visvedevas.] víśvo devásya nayitúr
5.51 (405) [Visvedevas.] ágne sutásya pītáye
5.52 (406) [Maruts.] prá śyāvāśva dhṛṣṇuyâ
5.53 (407) [Maruts.] kó veda jânam eṣ~āṃ
5.54 (408) [Maruts.] prá śárdhāya mârutāya svábhānava
5.55 (409) [Maruts.] práyajyavo marúto bhrâjadṛṣṭayo
5.56 (410) [Maruts.] ágne śárdhantam â gaṇám
5.57 (411) [Maruts.] â rudrāsa índravantaḥ sajóṣaso
5.58 (412) [Maruts.] tám u nūnáṃ táviṣīmantam eṣāṃ
5.59 (413) [Maruts.] prá va spáḷ akran suvitâya dāváne
5.60 (414) [Maruts.] îḷe agníṃ suávasaṃ námobhir
5.61 (415) [Maruts.] ké ṣṭhā naraḥ śréṣṭhatamā
5.62 (416) [Mitra-Varuna.] ṛténa rtám ápihitaṃ dhruváṃ vāṃ
5.63 (417) [Mitra-Varuna.] ŕtasya gopāv ádhi tiṣṭhatho ráthaṃ
5.64 (418) [Mitra-Varuna.] váruṇaṃ vo riśâdasam
5.65 (419) [Mitra-Varuna.] yáś cikéta sá sukrátur
5.66 (420) [Mitra-Varuna.] â cikitāna sukrátū
5.67 (421) [Mitra-Varuna.] báḷ itthâ deva niṣkṛtám
5.68 (422) [Mitra-Varuna.] prá vo mitrâya gāyata
5.69 (423) [Mitra-Varuna.] trî rocanâ varuṇa trîṁr utá dyûn
5.70 (424) [Mitra-Varuna.] purūrúṇā cid dhí ásti
5.71 (425) [Mitra-Varuna.] â no gantaṃ riśādasā
5.72 (426) [Mitra-Varuna.] â mitré váruṇe vayáṃ
5.73 (427) [Asvins.] yád adyá stháḥ parāváti
5.74 (428) [Asvins.] k~úṣṭho devāv aśvinā
5.75 (429) [Asvins.] práti priyátamaṃ ráthaṃ
5.76 (430) [Asvins.] â bhāti agnír uṣásām ánīkam
5.77 (431) [Asvins.] prātaryâvāṇā prathamâ yajadhvam
5.78 (432) [Asvins.] áśvināv éhá gachataṃ
5.79 (433) [Dawn.] mahé no adyá bodhaya
5.80 (434) [Dawn.] dyutádyāmānam bṛhatîm ṛténa
5.81 (435) [Savitar.] yuñjáte mána utá yuñjate dhíyo
5.82 (436) [Savitar.] tát savitúr vṛṇīmahe
5.83 (437) [Parjanya.] áchā vada tavásaṃ gīrbhír ābhíḥ
5.84 (438) [Prthivi.] báḷ itthâ párvatān~āṃ
5.85 (439) [Varuna.] prá samrâje bṛhád arcā gabhīrám
5.86 (440) [Indra-Agni.] índrāgnī yám ávatha
5.87 (441) [Maruts.] prá vo mahé matáyo yantu víṣṇave
