= Rigvedic deities =

Deities mentioned in the Rigveda

Rigvedic deities are deities mentioned in the sacred texts of Rigveda, the principal text of the historical Vedic religion of the Vedic period (1500–500 BCE).

There are 1,028 hymns (sūkta) in the Rigveda. Most of these hymns are dedicated to specific deities.

The most prominent deity is Indra, the supreme Deity who is king of the gods and ruler of heaven; Surya, the Sun; Agni, the sacrificial fire and messenger of the gods; and Soma, the ritual drink dedicated to Indra also related to the Moon, are additional principal deities.

== Deities by prominence ==
List of Rigvedic deities by a number of dedicated hymns, after Griffith. Some dedications are to paired deities, such as Indra-Agni, Mitra-Varuna, Soma-Rudra, here counted double. Visvedevas (all gods and goddesses together) have been invoked 70 times.

- Indra 250
- Agni 200
- Soma 123
- Ashvinas 56
- Varuna 46
- Maruts 38
- Mitra 28
- Ushas 21
- Vayu 12
- Savitr 11
- Ribhus 11
- Pushan 10
- Apris 9
- Brihaspati 8
- Surya 8
- Dyaus and Prithivi 6, plus 5.84 dedicated to Prithvi alone
- Apas 6
- Adityas 6
- Vishnu 6; 4 plus 2 paired hymns 1.155 dedicated to Vishnu-Indra & hymn 6.69 dedicated to Indra-Vishnu. A total of 6 hymns
- Brihaspati 6
- Rudra 4, 3 plus a paired hymn 6.74 dedicated to both Soma-Rudra. A total of 4 hymns
- Dadhikra 4
- Yama 4
- Sarasvati, goddess of Sarasvati River 3
- Parjanya 3
- Vac 2 (mentioned 130 times, venered in 10.125)
- Vastospati 2
- Vishvakarman 2
- Manyu 2

Minor deities (one single or no dedicated hymn)

- Chitragupta, a son of Brahma and Sarasvati mentioned Rig Veda Book 8, Hymn 21, Stanza 18
- Manas, a god in 10.58
- Dakshina, a god in 10.107
- Purusha in the Purusha sukta, 10.90
- Aranyani
- Ratri
- Aditi
- Shachi
- Bhaga
- Vasukra
- Atri
- Apam Napat
- Kshetrapati
- Ghrta
- Nirrti
- Asamati
- Urvasi
- Pururavas
- Vena
- Mayabheda
- Tarksya
- Tvastar
- Sanjna

== See also ==
- Historical Vedic religion
- List of Proto-Indo-European deities

== Sources ==
- Sri Aurobindo (1998), The Secret of Veda (PDF), The Complete Works of Sri Aurobindo, vol. 15, Pondicherry: Sri Aurobindo Ashram Press
- Flood, Gavin D. (1996), An Introduction to Hinduism, Cambridge University Press, ISBN 978-0-521-43878-0
- Griffith, Ralph T.H. (1888). Hymns of the Rigveda.
