= Shiva Puja =

Hindu way to worship Shiva

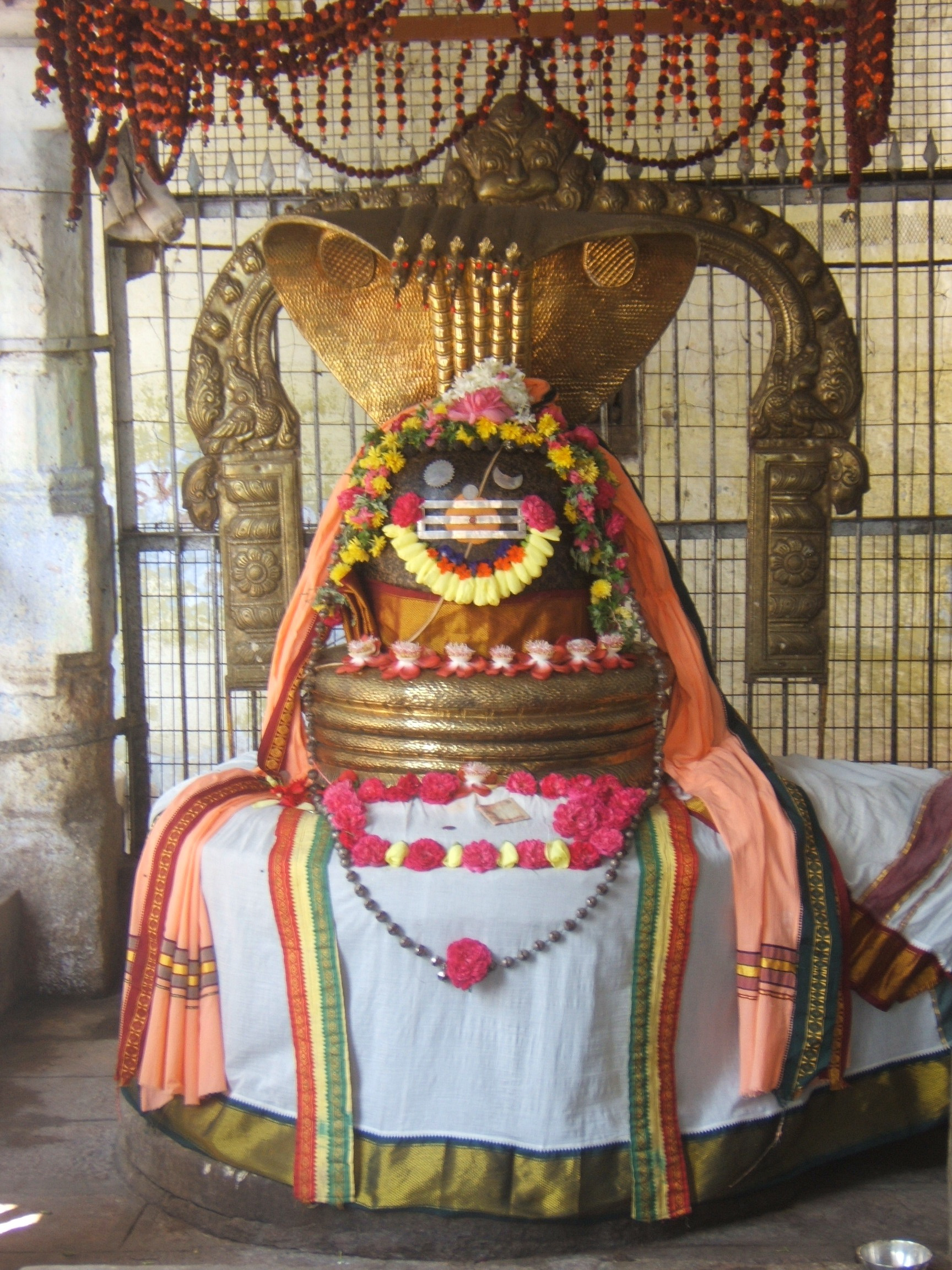
A Shiva Lingam worshipped at Jambukesvara temple in Thiruvanaikaval (Thiruaanaikaa)

Shiva Puja in Hinduism is the way by which one worships Shiva through traditional and ancient rites with the use of mantra, tantra, yantra, kriyas, mudras, and abhishekam.

== Introduction ==
In popular Hinduism, Shiva is often represented as a destructive aspect of Brahman and entitled 'The Destroyer.' This is merely one attribute, as there are many different groups and sects who hold Shiva, or any of his different forms and associated Deities, as the Supreme Being and attribute different titles to him. Popular Puja may take an eclectic or North Indian style, whereas more specific sects or castes may have their own specific forms. General worship of Shiva is quite diverse and can range from worshipping an anthropomorphic murti (Such as the famous Tamil Nataraja statues from the ancient Chola Kingdom), a Lingam (one of Shiva's main symbols), a deified landmark (such as the Ganges or Mount Kailash) or not worshipping a symbol at all (as in the case of the Lingayats).

== Puja in the Puranas ==
The Puranas are a collection of texts describing the feats of various Gods and Figures from Hindu Cosmology. The texts are organized by their focus on one of the major Devas and explore the feats and legends of those Gods. Among the most important attributed to Shiva is the Shiva Purana, which describes in various stories the mythological origins of puja implements and taboos. An example might be not offering Magnolia champaca and Pandanus odorifer flowers to Shiva, each given a justification grounded in an episode from mythology.

== Abhishekam ==
Shiva Abhishekam is usually performed to a Lingam, representing his manifestation as a creator of good (by destroying evil). In many temples, there is a vessel hung over the Lingam called Dhaara paatra that continuously drips water or other offerings onto the Lingam in deference to Shiva's desire for Abhisheka. Some of the common items used for Shiva Abhisheka are:

- Curd
- Milk/water
- Honey
- Vibhuti (holy ash)
- Panchamruta (Curd based delicacy consisting of five items: milk, sugar, ghee (clarified butter), honey, and curd)
- Sandalwood Paste
- Fragrant oils
- Bael leaves

== Shiva Slokas ==
The most important prayers to invoke and please God Shiva are done on Pradosha, the thirteenth day of every fortnight in the Hindu calendar, and on Maha Shivaratri, according to Shaivism. Herein the most powerful and popular Shiva Slokas are as below:

The Mahamrityunjaya Mantra reads (IAST transliteration):

   tryambakaṃ yajāmahe sugandhiṃ puṣṭi-vardhanam
   urvāruk miva bandhanān mṛtyor mukṣīya māmṛtāt

In the translation of Arthur Berriedale Keith (1914):

"OM. We worship and adore you, O three-eyed one, O Shiva. You are sweet gladness, the fragrance of life, who nourishes us, restores our health, and causes us to thrive. As, in due time, the stem of the cucumber weakens, and the gourd is freed from the vine, so free us from attachment and death, and do not withhold immortality."

The Panchakshara Stotra with Om:

"Om Namah Shivaya"

English translation of this mantra: "I bless the One Mind with praise and worship to Lord Shiva." "I honor the divinity within myself." "May the elements of this creation abide in me in perfection?" "May the greatest that can be in this world be created in me, in others and in this world." "I bow to Shiva."

== Lingashtakam ==
The Lingashtakam is a popular 8-canto hymn chanted during the worship of Shiva. The lyrics are as below,

Brahma Muraari Suraarchita Lingam

Nirmala Bhashita Shobhita Lingam

Janmaja Dukha Vinaashaka Lingam

Tat Pranamaami Sadaa Shiva Lingam

Meaning: I bow before that Sada Shiva Linga, which is adored by Brahma, Vishnu and other Gods, which is praised by pure and holy speeches and which destroys the cycle of births and deaths.

Devamuni Pravaraarchita Lingam

Kaamadaham Karunaakara Lingam

Raavana Darpa Vinaashaka Lingam

Tat Pranamaami Sada Shiva Lingam

Meaning: I bow before that Sada Shiva Linga, which is the destroyer of desires, which the Devas and the sages worship, which is infinitely compassionate and which subdued the pride of Raavana.

Sarva Sugandha Sulepitha Lingam

Buddhi Vivardhana Kaarana Lingam

Siddha Suraasura Vanditha Lingam

Tat Pranamaami Sadaa Shiva Lingam

Meaning: I bow before that Sada Shiva Linga, which is lavishly smeared with variegated perfumes and scents, which elevates the power of thought and enkindles the light of discrimination, and before which the Siddhas and Suras and Asuras prostrate.

Kanaka Mahaamani Bhushitha Lingam

Phanipathi Veshtitha Shobhitha Lingam

Daksha Su yagy Vinaashaka Lingam

Tat Pranamaami Sadaa Shiva Lingam

Meaning: I bow before that Sada Shiva Linga, the destroyer of Dakshas sacrifice, which is decorated with various ornaments, studded with different gems and rubies and which glows with the garland of the serpent Lord coiled around it.

Kumkuma Chandana Lepitha Lingam

Pankaja Haara Sushobhitha Lingam

Sanchitha Paapa Vinaashaka Lingam

Tat Pranamaami Sadaa Shiva Lingam

Meaning: I bow before that Sada Shiva Linga, which is smeared with saffron and sandal paste, which is decorated with lotus garlands and which wipes out all accumulated sins.

Devaganaarchitha Sevitha Lingam

Bhaavair Bhakti Bhirevacha Lingam

Dinakara Koti Prabhakara Lingam

Tat Pranamaami Sadaa Shiva Lingam

Meaning: I bow before that Sada Shiva Linga, which is worshipped by the multitude of Gods with genuine thoughts full of faith and devotion and whose splendor is like that of a million suns.

Ashta Dalopari Veshtitha Lingam

Sarva Samudbhava Kaarana Lingam

Ashta Daridra Vinaashaka Lingam

Tat Pranamaami Sadaa Shiva Lingam

Meaning: I bow before that Sada Shiva Linga, destroyer of all poverty and misery in its eight aspects, which is the cause of all creation and which stands on the eight-petalled Lotus.

Suraguru Suravara Pujitha Lingam

Suravana Pushpa Sadaarchitha Lingam

Paraatparam Paramatmaka Lingam

Tat Pranamaami Sadaa Shiva Lingam

Meaning: I bow before that Sada Shiva Linga, which is the Transcendent Being and the Supreme Self, worshipped by all Suras and their preceptor (Brhaspathi), with innumerable flowers from the celestial gardens.

== See also ==
- Puja in Buddhism, Jainism, and Hinduism.
- Aum Namah Sivaya, Shiva Mantra
- Shri Rudram, a Vedic chant on the early manifestation of Shiva as Rudra
- Kapalika, a sect of Saivites who worship Shiva in His Bhairava form
- History of Evolution of Saivism
- Saivism
- Aghori
- Hindu views on God and gender
