= Pati (title) =

Indian honorific

Pati (Sanskrit: पति, 𐬯𐬙) is a title meaning "master" or "lord". The word is in common usage in the Indian subcontinent today. Etymologically, the word derives from the Indo-European language family and finds references in various classical Indo-Iranian languages, including Sanskrit, Old Persian language and Avestan. In modern-day Hindustani and other Indo-Aryan languages, pati and patni have taken on the meanings of husband and wife respectively when used as standalone words. The feminine equivalent in Indo-Aryan languages is patni (literally, "mistress" or "lady"). The term pati is frequently used as a suffix, e.g. lakhpati (meaning, master of a lakh rupees).

== Modern usage ==
- As a standalone term indicating husband, pati
- In official titles, e.g. Rashtra-pati (राष्ट्रपति, راشٹرپتی, President, literally means 'Lord of the Nation'), Sena-pati (सेनापति, سیناپتی, General, literally means 'Lord of the Army') and Sabha-pati (सभापति, Chairperson, literally means 'Lord of the Council')
- In feudal and corporate titles, e.g. Bhumi-pati (भूमिपति, Landlord), Udyog-pati (उद्योगपति, Industrialist, literally means 'Lord of the Industry').
- In adjectives, e.g. crore-pati (करोड़पति, کروڑپتی, rich, master of a crore rupees), lakh-pati (लखपति, لکھپتی, rich person, master of a lakh rupees).
- As a descriptive term, e.g. dampati (married couple, master and mistress of the house)
- In names and surnames. It has been in usage in names in the Indian subcontinent since ancient times. Eg. Ganapati or Ganapathy (गणपति, Gana+Pati. Lord of the people/group/multitudes/categorical system).

== Etymology and cognates ==
The term pati is believed to originate from the Proto-Indo-European language. Older Persian languages, such as Avestan, use the term pati or paiti as a title extensively, e.g. dmana-paiti (master of the house, similar to Sanskrit dam-pati).

In Sanskrit, it is 'pat-' when uncompounded and meaning"husband" instrumental case p/atyā-; dative case p/atye-; genitive case ablative p/atyur-; locative case p/atyau-; But when meaning"lord, master", and in fine compositi or 'at the end of a compound' regularly inflected with exceptions; ) a master, owner, possessor, lord, ruler, sovereign etc. For example, in the Vedas, we come across words such as Brhas –pati, Praja – pati, Vachas –pati, Pasu – pati, Apam –pati, Bhu pati, Tridasa – pati and Nr - pati. Here the 'pati’' is suffix translated as “Lord of …………..”

In several Indo-European languages, cognate terms exist in varying forms (often as a suffix), for instance in the English word "despot" from the Greek δεσ-πότης, meaning "master, despot, lord, owner." In Latin, the term changed meaning from master to able, and is "an example of a substantive coming to be used as an adjective," resulting in English words such as potent, potential and potentate. In Lithuanian, pats as a standalone word came to mean husband, himself (patis in Old Lithuanian), as did pati in Hindi/Hindustani.

== Common usage ==
- Pithipati
- Rashtrapati
- Pashupati
- Ganapati
- Vāstoṣpati
- Vacaspati
- Brhaspati
- Ksetrapati
- Chhatrapati
- Sethupathi
- Crorepati
