= Vamadeva =

Sage in Hinduism

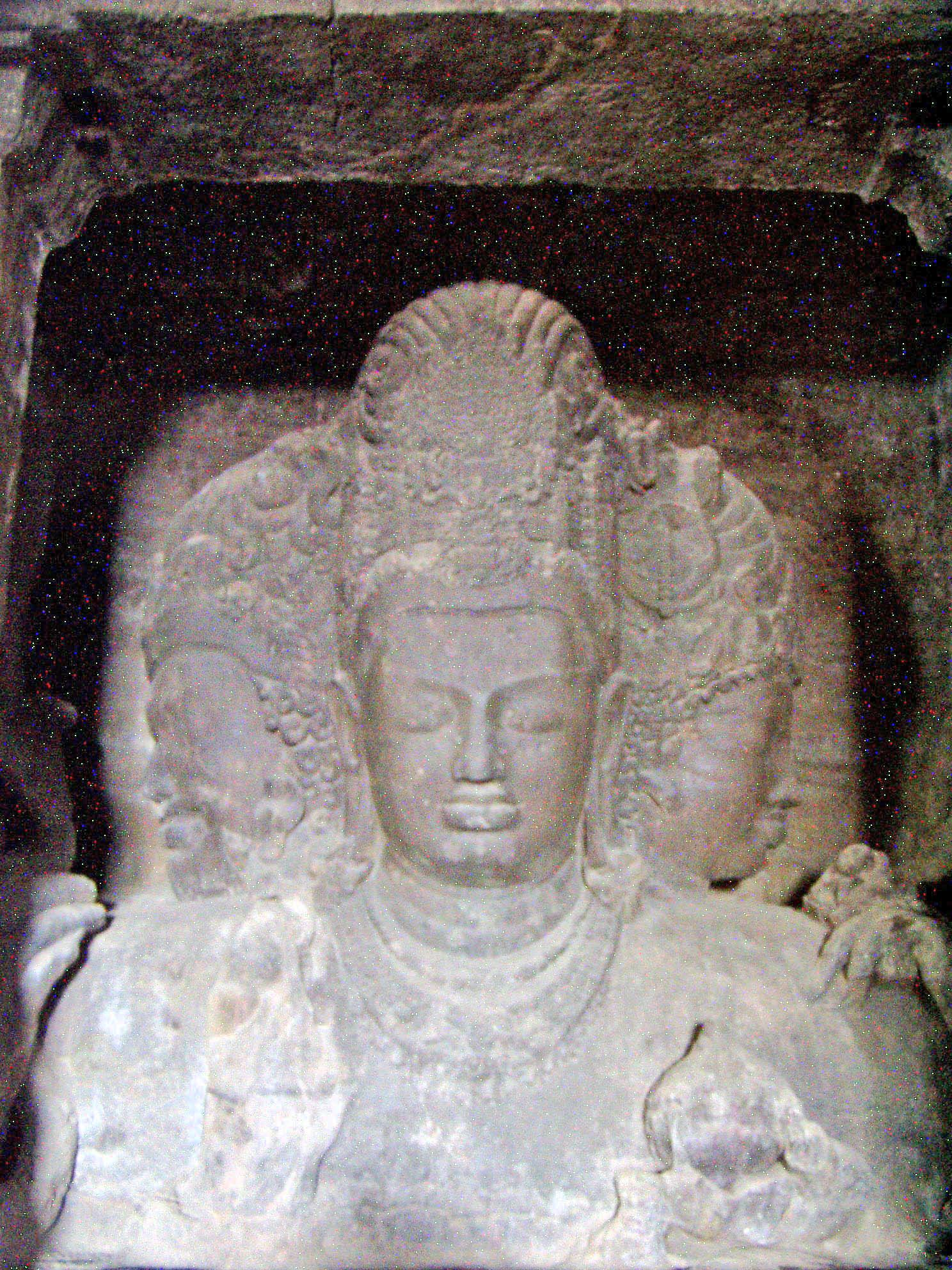
- Carving in the Elphanta caves of the fully manifest form of Siva: Bhairava (left), Vamadeva (right)

Personal life
- Parent: Gotama (father)

Religious life
- Religion: Historical Vedic religion
- Composed Mandala 4 of the Rigveda

Vamadeva (Sanskrit: वामदेव, romanized: Vāmadeva) is a rishi (sage) in Hindu literature. He is credited as the author of Mandala 4 of the Rigveda. He is mentioned prominently in the Upanishads as well, particularly the Brihadaranyaka and the Aitareya. He is described to be the son of a sage named Gotama and the brother of Nodhasa, who is also associated with hymns in the Rigveda. Vamadeva is the father of Brihaduktha, and belongs to the lineage of Sage Angiras.

== Etymology ==
Vamadeva is a bahuvrihi (Sanskrit compound) which means "he whose God (deva, देव) is beautiful (vāma, वाम)".

== Hinduism ==
In the Valmiki Ramayana Balakanda sarga 7, stanza 3, Vamadeva is a friend to Vasishta and a priest to Dasaratha.

In the Mahabharata, Vamadeva has a few roles. In Shanti Parva, chapter 92, he offers advice to King Vasumanas about the importance of righteousness. He is also a prominent member in Indra's assembly in Sabha Parva, chapter 7, stanza 17. Vana Parva, chapter 192, details an exchange between Vamadeva and King Shala of the Solar dynasty. While hunting, King Shala visits Vamadeva's hermitage, asking the sage for a few of his exceptionally swift horses, known as vamya, in order to catch a deer. Vamadeva agrees to lend the king the horses on the condition that they be returned immediately after the hunt. After the hunt, Shala breaks his promise and keeps the horses in his palace, reasoning that the horses were unfit for the possession of a Brahmin. A month later, Vamadeva sends his disciple to ask the king to return the horses, but the king refused. Angered, the sage personally travels to the king's court to demand their return. When refused once more, the sage warns the king not to create a conflict between their respective classes. The king offers the sage bulls, donkeys, and other horses instead, calling Vamadeva unworthy to own the vamyas. Furious, Vamadeva curses the king to be slain by rakshasas, and Shala is killed. Shala's brother, Dala, succeeds him to the throne. Dala also refuses to give up the horses, and he plots to have Vamadeva killed with a poisoned arrow. Vamadeva foils this scheme. When the new king repents, Vamadeva tells him that he may be absolved of the sin of trying to murder a Brahmin by touching his queen with the arrow. The queen praises the sage and promises to serve Brahmins well thereafter. Pleased, Vamadeva offers her a boon, and she asks that he forgive her husband and wish him well. The boon granted, Dala returns the horses to the sage.

According to the Manusmriti and his own self-confession in the Rigveda, Vamadeva had once ate a dog's intestines. This incident is variously interpreted by scholars.

In the Ganesha Purana, Vamadeva curses a gandharva who accidentally trampled him to become a mouse. When the gandharva begged for mercy, the sage added that as a mouse, he would assume the honourable role of the vahana (mount) of Ganesha.

== See also ==
- Angiras
- Dirghatamas
- Gritsamada
