= Visvanatha Shiva Temple, Bhubaneswar =

Visvanatha Shiva Temple

Religion
- Affiliation: Hinduism
- District: Khordha
- Deity: Shiva

Location
- Location: Bhubaneswar
- State: Orissa
- Country: India
- Interactive map of Visvanatha Shiva Temple
- Coordinates: 20°14′35″N 85°50′04″E

Architecture
- Completed: 19th century C.E.
- Elevation: 26 m (85 ft)

Visvanatha Siva Temple is a Hindu temple dedicated to Visvanatha and is one of the temples of Bhubaneswar, a revered pilgrimage center and the capital of the state of Orissa, India. It is a living temple, facing west, situated on the road from Lingaraja Temple to Mausima Temple. The presiding deity is a Siva lingam with a circular yoni installed inside the sanctum that was brought from Kasi. The temple was built in the 19th century and is of modern construction.

== Name ==
Its present name is the Visvanatha Siva Temple-II.

== Ownership ==
The temple is now under the Lingaraja temple administration but renovation works were carried out by Ghanasyama Garabadu. The temple was repaired and maintained by Ghanasyama Garabadu of Badu Sahi, Old Town and Bhubaneswar.

== Age ==
According to local information it dates from the 19th Century A.D.

== Property Type ==
Vimana is a rekha deul and jagamohana is a pidha deul.

== Property use ==
It is presently in use as a living temple. Various religious sacraments like Sankranti, Chatturdasi and Jalabhisekha are performed. Rituals like Rudrabhisekha, Rudrasthami and Mahamritunjaya are also performed.

== Physical description ==
The temple is surrounded by the Lingaraja temple compound wall in the north at a distance of 6.75 metres, Dolagovinda temple in south, Rosasala (kitchen house) in west and the leading road to the northern entrance of Lingaraja temple in west. There is a compound wall made of laterite and with the entrance in the western side, the northern compound wall of the Lingaraja served the southern compound wall of the temple. The temple is oriented facing towards west.

On plan, the temple has a Vimana and Jagamohana of modern construction measuring 6.65 metres in length and 2.90 metres in width. The sanctum measures 2.80 square metres and jagamohana 2.90 square metres. With threefold division of the bada the temple has a trianga bada measuring 1.90 metres. At the base pabhaga has a set of five mouldings of khura, kumbha, pata, kani and basanta that measures 0.64 metres. Jangha is plain measuring 0.84 metres in height, baranda measures 0.42 metres. Gandi measures 2.45 metres and is devoid of decoration. mastaka conforms to the typical Kalingan style that measures 1.30 metres in height.

The raha niches on the three sides uniformly measures 0.40 metres in height x 0.25 metres in width and 0.17 metres in depth. All are empty.

The monument is covered with modern cement plaster. It was constructed using dry masonry.

It was constructed in the Kalingan style.

== Grade (A/B/C) ==
- Architecture: C
- Historic: C
- Associational: C
- Social/Cultural: B

== See also ==
- List of Hindu Temples in Orissa
