= Gajapati =

Gajapati, 'Ruler of the elephants' in Sanskrit, may refer to:

- Gajapati (title), a lord with an army of elephants; title for a powerful sovereign lord.
- Gajapati Empire, a medieval Hindu dynasty in India ruled by the Suryavamsa dynasty
- Gajapati district, a district in Odisha, India
