= Khidkaleshwar Mandir =

Religion
- Affiliation: Hinduism
- District: Thane
- Deity: Shiva

Location
- Location: Dombivli
- State: Maharashtra
- Country: India
- Interactive map of Khidkaleshwar Mandir

The Khidkali temple or the Khidkaleshwar Mandir is a Hindu temple located in Dombivli, Maharashtra, India.

The present temple structure was probably rebuilt in the 17th century. Inside the main temple there are other ancient idols of Lord Ganeśa, Hanumān. The temple is situated on the banks of the Khiḍkali Lake. There are several small temples near-by: Dattātreya, Hanumān and other Gurūs. There is a small park inside the temple campus for children's recreation.

According to the legend, once when Pānḍavās visited this place during Araṇyavasām, Yudhiṣhṭhira wanted to perform Śiva pūja. So the Pānḍavās built this temple for Yudhiṣhṭhir‘s pūja.
