= RV4 =

RV4 may refer to:

- Mandala 4, the fourth mandala of the Rigveda
- Norwegian National Road 4 (Norwegian: Riksvei 4)
- Van's Aircraft RV-4, a kit aircraft
