= RV7 =

RV7 may refer to:

- Mandala 7, the seventh mandala of the Rigveda
- Van's Aircraft RV-7, a kit aircraft
