= Om Namah Shivaya =

Hindu mantra

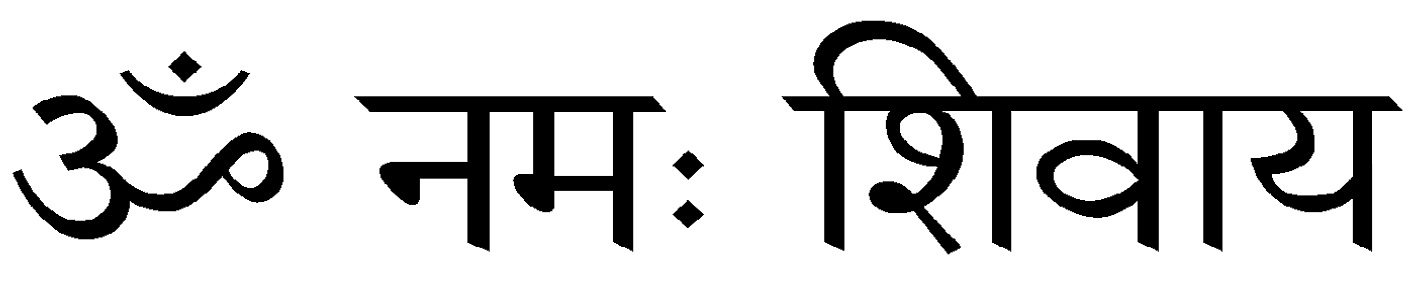
The mantra Om Namah Shivaya in Devanagari script

Om Namah Shivaya (Devanagari: ॐ नमः शिवाय; IAST: Oṃ Namaḥ Śivāya) is one of the most popular Hindu mantras and the most important mantra in Shaivism. Namah Shivaya means "O salutations to the auspicious one!", or "adoration to Lord Shiva". It is called Siva Panchakshara, or Shiva Panchakshara or simply Panchakshara meaning the "five-syllable" mantra (viz., excluding the Om) and is dedicated to Shiva. This Mantra appears as 'Na' 'Ma' 'Śi' 'Vā' and 'Ya' in the Shri Rudram Chamakam which is a part of the Krishna Yajurveda and also in the Rudrashtadhyayi which is a part of the Shukla Yajurveda.

== Origin of the mantra ==
The mantra without the initial Om was originally a verse in the eighth hymn of the Namakam section of the Shri Rudram, (TS 4.5.8.1) itself taken from the Taittirīya Samhita, a recension of the Black Yajurveda. It appears as, Namaḥ śivāya ca śivatarāya ca (Sanskrit: नमः शिवाय च शिवतराय च). The English translation of the mantra is, "Salutation to the auspicious one and to the more auspicious".

This mantra also appears in the Rudrashtadhyayi, a part of the Shukla Yajurveda. In the Rudrashtadhyayi, it appears in the 5th chapter (also known as Namakam) verse 41.

== Translations among different traditions ==
In Siddha Shaivism and Shaiva Siddhanta Shaivism traditions, Namah Shivaya is considered as Pancha Bodha Tatva of Lord Shiva and his universal oneness of five elements:

- Na sound represents earth
- Ma sound represents water
- Śi sound represents fire
- Vā sound represents Pranic air
- Ya sound represents sky or ether

Its total meaning is that "universal consciousness is one".

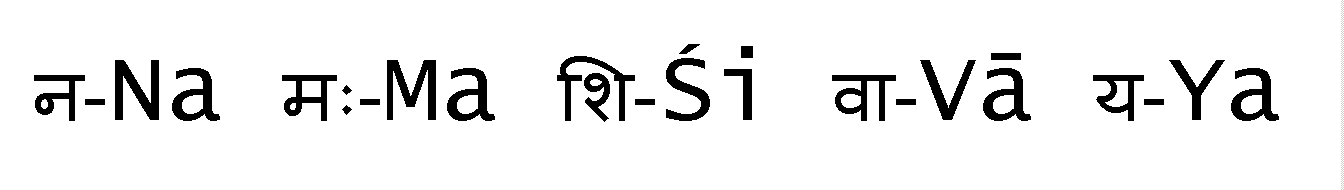
The five-syllable (Panch Akshara) form, omitting the Om

In Shaiva Siddhanta, the five letters also represent:

- Na is the Lord's concealing grace
- Ma is the world
- Śi stands for Shiva
- Vā is His revealing grace
- Ya is the Ātman or soul

The Tirumantiram (a scripture in Shaiva Siddhanta) announces that "His feet are the letter Na. His navel is the letter Ma. His shoulders are the letter Śi. His mouth, the letter Vā. His radiant cranial center aloft is Ya. Thus is the five-lettered form of Shiva.": Tirumantiram 941. TM

== In different scriptures ==
1. The Mantra appears as 'Na' 'Ma' 'Śi' 'Vā' and 'Ya' in the Shri Rudram Chamakam which is a part of the Krishna Yajurveda. Thus predates the use of Shiva as a proper name, in the original context being an address to Lord Rudra (later Shiva), where Shiva retains its original meaning as an adjective, meaning "auspicious, benign, friendly", a euphemistic epithet of Rudra.
2. The mantra appears in the Rudrashtadhyayi which is a part of the Shukla Yajurveda.
3. Whole Panchakshara Stotra is dedicated to this mantra.
4. Tirumantiram, a scripture written in Tamil language, speaks of the meaning of the mantra.

== See also ==
- Hara Hara Mahadeva
- Mahamrityunjaya Mantra
- Om Namo Narayanaya
- Prayer beads
- Rudrakshajabala Upanishad
