= Hari Om =

Hindu mantra

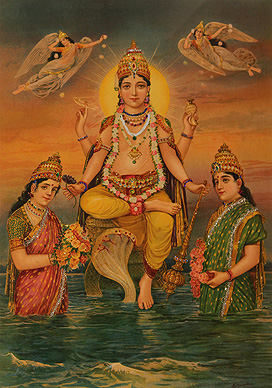
Vishnu with his consorts Shridevi and Bhudevi, M.V. Dhurandhar; Hari Om is an important mantra in Vaishnavism.

Hari Om (Sanskrit: हरिः ॐ, romanised: Hariḥ Oṃ) is a Hindu mantra. Hari Om may be chanted at the beginning of auspicious activities, before prayer or Vedic chanting, or during meditation. It is also employed as a greeting.

== Description ==
Hari has multiple meanings in Sanskrit. The name is commonly used especially in the Vaishnav tradition, as an epithet of the Hindu deity Vishnu. As such, Vishnu is therefore a common addressee of the mantra Hari Om.

According to the Agni Purana, remembering the name of Hari causes the expiation of a person who has committed a sin. The repetition of Om is stated to offer the same result.

The mantra is also sometimes regarded as allowing the chanter to achieve moksha.

== See also ==
- Hare Krishna
- Hara Hara Mahadeva
- Om Namo Narayanaya
