= Mandala 4 =

Fourth book of the Rigveda

The fourth Mandala of the Rigveda has 58 hymns, mainly to Agni and Indra. It is one of the "family books" (mandalas 2–7), the oldest core of the Rigveda, which were composed in early vedic period(1500-1000 BCE).

The Rigveda Anukramani attributes all hymns in this book to Vāmadeva Gautama (son of Maharishi Gautama), except for hymns 43 and 44, attributed to Purumīḍha Sauhotra and Ajamīḍha Sauhotra.

== List of incipits ==
The dedication as given by Griffith is in square brackets

4.1 (297) [Agni.] tuvâṃ hí agne sádam ít samanyávo
4.2 (298) [Agni.] yó mártiyeṣu amŕta ṛtâvā
4.3 (299) [Agni.] â vo râjānam adhvarásya rudráṃ
4.4 (300) [Agni.] kṛṇuṣvá pâjaḥ prásitiṃ ná pṛthvîṃ
4.5 (301) [Agni.] vaiśvānarâya mīḷhúṣe sajóṣāḥ
4.6 (302) [Agni.] ūrdhvá ū ṣú ṇo adhvarasya hotar
4.7 (303) [Agni.] ayám ihá prathamó dhāyi dhātŕbhir
4.8 (304) [Agni.] dūtáṃ vo viśvávedasaṃ
4.9 (305) [Agni.] ágne mṛḷá mahâṁ asi
4.10 (306) [Agni.] ágne tám adyá
4.11 (307) [Agni.] bhadráṃ te agne sahasinn ánīkam
4.12 (308) [Agni.] yás tvâm agna inádhate yatásruk
4.13 (309) [Agni.] práti agnír uṣásām ágram akhyad
4.14 (310) [Agni.] práti agnír uṣáso jātávedā
4.15 (311) [Agni.] agnír hótā no adhvaré
4.16 (312) [Indra.] â satyó yātu maghávāṁ ṛjīṣî
4.17 (313) [Indra.] tuvám mahâṁ indara túbhya * ha kṣâ
4.18 (314) [Indra and Others.] ayám pánthā ánuvittaḥ purāṇó
4.19 (315) [Indra.] evâ tuvâm indara vajrin átra
4.20 (316) [Indra.] â na índro dūr~âd â na āsâd
4.21 (317) [Indra.] â yātu índro ávasa úpa na
4.22 (318) [Indra.] yán na índro jujuṣé yác ca váṣṭi
4.23 (319) [Indra.] kathâ mahâm avṛdhat kásya hótur
4.24 (320) [Indra.] kâ suṣṭutíḥ śávasaḥ sūnúm índram
4.25 (321) [Indra.] kó adyá ? náriyo devákāma
4.26 (322) [Indra.] ahám mánur abhavaṃ sûriyaś ca
4.27 (323) [The Falcon.] gárbhe nú sánn ánu eṣām avedam
4.28 (324) [Indra-Soma.] tuvâ yujâ táva tát soma sakhyá
4.29 (325) [Indra.] â na stutá úpa vâjebhir ūtî
4.30 (326) [Indra.] nákir indra tvád úttaro
4.31 (327) [Indra.] káyā naś citrá â bhuvad
4.32 (328) [Indra.] â tû na indra vṛtrahann
4.33 (329) [ Rbhus.] prá rbhúbhyo dūtám iva vâcam iṣya
4.34 (330) [Rbhus.] ṛbhúr víbhvā vâja índro no ácha
4.35 (331) [Rbhus.] ihópa yāta śavaso napātaḥ
4.36 (332) [Rbhus.] anaśvó jātó anabhīśúr ukthíyo
4.37 (333) [Rbhus.] úpa no vājā adhvarám ṛbhukṣā
4.38 (334) [ Dadhikras.] utó hí vāṃ dātarâ sánti pûrvā
4.39 (335) [Dadhikras.] āśúṃ dadhikrâṃ tám u nú ṣṭavāma
4.40 (336) [ Dadhikravan.] dadhikrâvṇa íd u nú carkirāma
4.41 (337) [Indra-Varuna.] índrā kó vāṃ varuṇā sumnám āpa
4.42 (338) [Indra-Varuna.] máma dvitâ rāṣṭaráṃ kṣatríyasya
4.43 (339) [ Asvins.] ká u śravat katamó yajñíyānāṃ
4.44 (340) [Asvins.] táṃ vāṃ ráthaṃ vayám adyâ huvema
4.45 (341) [Asvins.] eṣá syá bhānúr úd iyarti yujyáte
4.46 (342) [ Vayu. Indra-Vayu.] ágram pibā mádhūn~āṃ
4.47 (343) [Vayu. Indra-Vayu.] vâyo śukró ayāmi te
4.48 (344) [Vayu.] vihí hótrā ávītā
4.49 (345) [Indra-Brhaspati.] idáṃ vām āsíye havíḥ
4.50 (346) [Brhaspati.] yás tastámbha sáhasā ví jmó ántān
4.51 (347) [ Dawn.] idám u tyát purutámam purástāj
4.52 (448) [Dawn.] práti ṣyâ sūnárī jánī
4.53 (349) [ Savitar.] tád devásya savitúr vâriyam mahád
4.54 (350) [Savitar.] ábhūd deváḥ savitâ vándiyo nú na
4.55 (351) [ Visvedevas.] kó vas trātâ vasavaḥ kó varūtâ
4.56 (352) [ Heaven and Earth.] mahî dyâvāpṛthivî ihá jyéṣṭhe
4.57 (353) [ Ksetrapati, Etc.] kṣétrasya pátinā vayáṃ
4.58 (354) [ Ghrta.] samudrâd ūrmír mádhumāṁ úd ārad
