= Rudra =

Vedic storm and wind deity; epithet of Shiva

- God of Storm, Wind, Medicine, Hunt, Animals, Life and Yagna
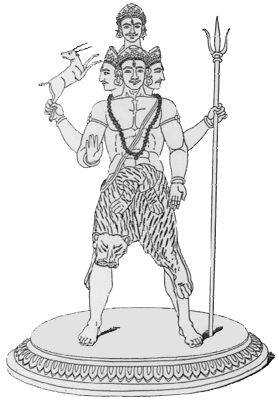
- Depiction of Vedic Rudra
- Affiliation: Ashtamurti, Indra, Maruts, Ashvins, Pashupati
- Mantra: Mahamrityunjaya Mantra; Om Namo Bhagavate Rudrāya
- Weapons: Bow and Arrow, Vajra, Ankusha
- Texts: Shri Rudram, Rig Veda

Rudra (Sanskrit: रुद्र, IPA: [rud̪rɐ]) is a Rigvedic deity associated with Shiva, the wind or storms, Vayu, medicine, and wildlife. One translation of the name is 'the roarer'. In the Rigveda, Rudra is praised as the "mightiest of the mighty". Rudra means "who eradicates problems from their roots". Depending upon the period, the name Rudra can be interpreted as 'the most severe roarer/howler' or 'the most frightening one'. This name appears in the Shiva Sahasranama, and R. K. Sharma notes that it is often used as a name of Shiva in later languages. The "Shri Rudram" hymn from the Yajurveda is dedicated to Rudra and is important in the Shaivite sect. In the Prathama Anuvaka of Namakam (Taittiriya Samhita 4.5), Rudra is revered as Sadasiva (meaning 'mighty Shiva') and Mahadeva. Sadashiva is the Supreme Being, Paramashiva, in the Siddhanta sect of Shaivism.

== Etymology ==
The etymology of the theonym Rudra is uncertain. It is usually derived from the Proto-Indo-European (PIE) root rud- (related to English rude), which means 'to cry, howl'. The name Rudra may thus be translated as 'the roarer'. An alternative etymology interprets Rudra as the 'red one', the 'brilliant one', possibly derived from a lost root rud-, 'red' or 'ruddy', or alternatively, according to Grassman, 'shining'.

Stella Kramrisch notes a different etymology connected with the adjectival form raudra, which means 'wild', i.e., of rude (untamed) nature, and translates the name Rudra as 'the wild one' or 'the fierce god'. R. K. Śarmā follows this alternative etymology and translates the name as 'the terrible' in his glossary for the Shiva Sahasranama. Mallory and Adams also mention a comparison with the Old Russian deity Rŭglŭ to reconstruct a Proto-Indo-European wild-god named *Rudlos, though they remind that the issue of the etymology remains problematic: from PIE *reud- ('rend, tear apart'; cf. Latin rullus, 'rustic'), or *reu- ('howl').

The commentator Sāyaṇa suggests six possible derivations for rudra. However, another reference states that Sayana suggested ten derivations. The adjective śiva (shiva) in the sense of 'propitious' or 'kind' is first applied to the Rudra in RV 10.92.9.

Rudra is called 'the archer' (Sanskrit: Śarva) and the arrow is an essential attribute of Rudra. This name appears in the Shiva Sahasranama, and R. K. Śarmā notes that it is used as a name of Shiva often in later languages. The word is derived from the Sanskrit root śarv- which means 'to injure' or 'to kill', and Śarmā uses that general sense in his interpretive translation of the name Śarva as 'One who can kill the forces of darkness'. The names Dhanvin ('bowman') and Bāṇahasta ('archer', literally 'Armed with a hand-full of arrows') also refer to archery.

In other contexts the word rudra can simply mean 'the number eleven'. The word rudraksha (Sanskrit: rudrākṣa = rudra and akṣa 'eye' or tear), or 'eye or tears of Rudra', is used as a name for both the berry of the rudraksha tree and a name for a string of the prayer beads made from those seeds.

Rudra is one of the names of Vishnu in Vishnu Sahasranama. Adi Shankara in his commentary to Vishnu Sahasranama defined the name Rudra as 'One who makes all beings cry at the time of cosmic dissolution'. Author D. A. Desai in his glossary for the Vishnu Sahasranama says Vishnu in the form of Rudra is the one who does the total destruction at the time of great dissolution.

== Rigvedic hymns ==
The earliest known mentions of the Vedic deity Rudra, occur in the Rigveda, where three entire hymns are devoted to him (RV 1.114, 2.33, and 7.46). Two further hymns are devoted to Rudra jointly with Soma (RV 1.43 and 6.74). There are about seventy-five references to Rudra in the Rigveda overall.

=== Form of Rudra ===
In the Rigveda (RV) are verses which speak about the form of Rudra. Some of them are:

Sanskrit	Transliteration	Translation	Source
त्र्यम्बकं यजामहे	tryambakaṃ yajāmahe	We worship the three-eyed one	RV 7.59.12
कपर्दिने	kapardine	Who has matted hair	RV 1.114.1
हिरण्यम् इव रोचते	hiraṇyam iva rocate	Who shines like gold	RV 1.43.5
शुक्र इव सूर्यो	śukra iva sūryo	Who shines like [the] Sun	RV 1.43.5
स्थीरेभिरंगै	sthīrebhiraṃgai	Who is with firm limbs	RV 2.33.9
पुरुरुप	pururupa	Who has multiforms	RV 2.33.9
यजतं विश्वरुपम्	yajataṃ viśvarupam	Who is of the form of the universe	RV 2.33.10
येभिः शिवः	yebhiḥ śivaḥ	Who is auspicious	RV 10.92.9

=== Epithets of fierceness and fright ===
In the Rigveda, Rudra's role as a frightening god is apparent in references to him as ghora ('extremely terrifying'), or simply as asau devam ('that god'). He is 'fierce like a terrific wild beast' (RV 2.33.11). Chakravarti sums up the perception of Rudra by saying: 'Rudra is thus regarded with a kind of cringing fear, as a deity whose wrath is to be deprecated and whose favor curried'.

RV 1.114 is an appeal to Rudra for mercy, where he is referred to as 'mighty Rudra, the god with braided hair'.

In RV 7.46, Rudra is described as armed with a bow and fast-flying arrows, although many other weapons are known to exist. As quoted by R. G. Bhandarkar, the hymn declare that Rudra discharges 'brilliant shafts which run about the heaven and the earth' (RV 7.46.3), which may be a reference to lightning.

Rudra was believed to cure diseases, and when people recovered from them or were free of them, that too was attributed to the agency of Rudra. He is asked not to afflict children with disease (RV 7.46.2) and to keep villages free of illness (RV 1.114.1). He is said to have healing remedies (RV 1.43.4), as the best physician of physicians (RV 2.33.4), and as possessed of a thousand medicines (RV 7.46.3). So he is described with an alternative name, Vaidyanatha (Lord of Remedies).

=== Epithets of supreme rule ===
A verse from the Rig Veda (RV 2.33.9) calls Rudra 'The Lord or Sovereign of the Universe' (īśānādasya bhuvanasya):

Devanagari

स्थि॒रेभि॒रङ्गै॑: पुरु॒रूप॑ उ॒ग्रो ब॒भ्रुः शु॒क्रेभि॑: पिपिशे॒ हिर॑ण्यैः ।
ईशा॑नाद॒स्य भुव॑नस्य॒ भूरे॒र्न वा उ॑ योषद् रु॒द्राद॑सु॒र्य॑म् ॥

IAST

sthi̱rebhi̱raṅgai̍: puru̱rūpa̍ u̱gro ba̱bhruḥ śu̱krebhi̍: pipiśe̱ hira̍ṇyaiḥ .
īśā̍nāda̱sya bhuva̍nasya̱ bhūre̱rna vā u̍ yoṣad ru̱drāda̍su̱rya̍m.

English

With firm limbs, multiform, the strong, the tawny adorns himself with bright gold decorations:
The strength of Godhead never departs from Rudra, him who is Sovereign of this world, the mighty.

A verse of Śrī Rudram (= Yajurveda 16.18) speaks of Rudra as Lord of the Universe:

जगताम् पतये नमः ।

jagatam pataye namaḥ ।

Homage to the Lord of the Universe.

Another verse (Yajurveda 16.46) locates Rudra in the heart of the gods, showing that he is the inner Self of all, even the gods:

देवानां हृदयभ्यो नमो ।

devānāṃ hṛdayabhyo namo

Salutations to him who is in heart of the gods.

In a verse popularly known as the Mahamrityunjaya Mantra, both Rig Veda (7.59.12) and Yajur Veda (3.60) recommend worshipping Rudra to attain moksha (liberation):

Devanagari

त्र्य॑म्बकं यजामहे सु॒गन्धिं॑ पुष्टि॒वर्ध॑नम् ।
उ॒र्वा॒रु॒कमि॑व॒ बन्ध॑नान्मृ॒त्योर्मु॑क्षीय॒ मामृता॑त् ॥

IAST

tryàmbakaṃ yajāmahe sugándhiṃ puṣṭivárdhanam.
urvārukámiva bándhanānmṛtyórmukṣīya mā́mṛ́tāt.

Translation by Stephanie W. Jamison and Joel P. Brereton:

We sacrifice to Tryambaka the fragrant, increaser of prosperity.
Like a cucumber from its stem, might I be freed from death, not from deathlessness.

In the Taittiriya Aranyaka of Yajur Veda (10.24.1), Rudra is identified as the universal existent ('all this') and thus as the Purusha (Supreme Person or inner Self) of the Vedas:

sarvo vai rudrastasmai rudrāya namo astu
puruṣo vai rudraḥ sanmaho namo namaḥ
viśvaṃ bhūtaṃ bhuvanaṃ citraṃ bahudhā jātaṃ jāyamānaṃ ca yat
sarvo hyeṣa rudrastasmai rudrāya namo astu ॥ 1॥

All this verily is Rudra. To Rudra who is such we offer our salutation. We salute again and again that Being, Rudra, who alone is the Purusha and the Soul of creatures. The material universe, the created beings, and whatever there is manifoldly and profusely created, in the past and in the present, in the form of the world—all that is indeed this Rudra. Salutations be to Rudra who is such.

The Taittiriya Aranyaka of Yajur Veda 1.10.1 identifies Rudra and Brihaspati as Sons and companions of Bhumi (Earth) and Heaven:

Sanskrit Romanized (IAST)	Roman (Harvard-Kyoto) translation	English translation
sahasravṛdiyaṃ bhūmiḥ	yam bhUmi: sahasravrt	This world is desired as a place of abode by thousands of Jeevaraasis
paraṃ vyŏmaḥ sahasravṛt	param vyOma: sahasravrt	The upper world is similarly desired by the thousands of Devas.
aśvinā bhujyū nāsatyā	bhujyU na asatyA viSvasya jagata: patI aSvinA	The earth and the heaven (Svarga lOkam) are like the twin gods, Asvini Devas, who banish diseases and bless us with bhOgams; Asvini Devas are the protectors of the universe and their sankalpam (volition) never fails.
viśvasya jagataspatī	bhujyU na asatyA viSvasya jagata: patI aSvinA	The earth and the heaven (Svarga lOkam) are like the twin gods, Asvini Devas, who banish diseases and bless us with bhOgams; Asvini Devas are the protectors of the universe and their sankalpam (volition) never fails.
jāyā bhūmiḥ patirvyoma	bhUmi: jAyA vyOma pati: taa mithunam aturyathu:	BhU lOkam is the wife and the Heaven is the husband; they are united like a couple.
mithunantā aturyathuḥ	bhUmi: jAyA vyOma pati: taa mithunam aturyathu:	BhU lOkam is the wife and the Heaven is the husband; they are united like a couple.
putro bṛhaspatī rudraḥ	putra: brhaspatI rudra:	We have to consider Brhaspati and Rudran (aging here) as their sons
saramā iti strīpumam	saramA iti	The raised platform for the Yaagam, Yaaga meDai (Yajn~a Vedi) should be considered as a lady.
saramā iti strīpumam	iti strI pumam	Thus we are instructed about the male-female aspects of the Earth and the Heaven.
[Now comes the prayer to the abhimAna devatais for BhUmi and the upper world.]
śukraṃ vāmanyadyajataṃ vāmanyat	vAm anyat Sukram vAm anyat yajatam	Among your forms, one is the day with white hue, the other is the night with dark hue.
viṣurūpe ahanī dyauriva sthaḥ	vishurUpe ahanI dyau iva stha:	Both of You stay steady as the Sooryan in the sky with equal, unique and alternating forms.

=== Relation to other deities ===
Rudra is used both as a name of Shiva and collectively ('the Rudras') as the name for the Maruts. Maruts are 'storm gods' associated with the atmosphere. They are a group of gods whose number varies from two to sixty, sometimes also rendered as eleven, thirty-three or a hundred and eighty in number (i. e., three times sixty. See RV 8.96.8.).

The Rudras are sometimes referred to as 'the sons of Rudra' while Rudra is referred to as 'Father of the Maruts' (RV 2.33.1).

Rudra is mentioned along with a litany of other deities in RV 7.40.5. Here is the reference to Rudra, whose name appears as one of many gods who are called upon:

This Varuṇa, the leader of the rite, and the royal Mitra and Aryaman, uphold my acts, and the divine unopposed Aditi, earnestly invoked: may they convey us safe beyond evil. I propitiate with oblations the ramifications (vayāḥ) of that divine attainable Viṣṇu, the showerer of benefits. Rudra, bestow upon us the magnificence of his nature. The Aśvins have come down to our dwelling abounding with (sacrificial) food.

== Non-Rigvedic hymns ==
In the various recensions of the Yajurveda is included a litany of stanzas praising Rudra: Maitrāyaṇī-Saṃhitā 2.9.2, Kāṭhaka-Saṃhitā 17.11, Taittirīya-Saṃhitā 4.5.1 and Vājasaneyi-Saṃhitā 16.1–14. This litany is subsequently referred to variously as the Śatarudriyam and the Namakam (because many of the verses commence with the word namaḥ, meaning 'homage'), or simply the Rudram. This litany was recited during the Agnicayana ritual ('the piling of Agni'), and it later became a standard element in Rudra liturgy.

A selection of similar stanzas is included in the Paippalāda-Saṃhitā of the Atharvaveda (PS 14.3–4). This selection, with further PS additions at the end, circulated more widely as the Nīlarudra (or Nīlarudra Upaniṣad). Lubin suggests that in the Nīlarudra, lightning is envisioned both as Rudra's arrows and as the deity himself:

1. I saw you descending from the sky, down to earth; I saw Rudra shooting [his arrows], blue-necked, crested.

2. From the sky the mighty one has descended; he has taken his stand upon the earth. O people, look at him: the blue-necked, the red one. ...

10. They have seen you descending, blue-necked, red: both the herdsmen have seen you, and the women fetching water [have seen] you, and all beings [have seen] you: Homage to you who are seen! ..."

The Hindu god Shiva shares several features with Rudra. The theonym Śiva ('kind') originated as a euphemistic epithet for Rudra, who is similarly invoked as Aghora ('not frightful') and Abhayaṅkara ('providing safety'). Although Rudra remains the primary designation of the god, e.g., in the Pāśupata ascetic tradition, lay devotees preferred to address him as Śiva, Maheśvara ('Great Lord'), or Mahādeva ('Great God'), as in the Śivadharma literature, the Sanskrit epics, and the Purāṇas. Those epithets come to be the primary names of the deity.

=== Shri Rudram ===
The president of the Ramakrishna Mission, at Chennai, in commentating on the foreword to Swami Amritananda's translation of Sri Rudram and Purushasuktam, states, 'Rudra to whom these prayers are addressed is not a sectarian deity, but the Supreme Being who is omnipresent and manifests Himself in myriad forms for the sake of the diverse spiritual aspirants'. Shri Rudram occurs in the fourth Kanda of the Taittiriya Samhita in the Yajurveda. It is a preeminent Vedic hymn to Shiva as the God of dissolution and it is chanted daily in Shiva temples throughout India.

The prayer depicts the diverse aspects of the Almighty. The Shri Rudram hymn is unique in that it shows the presence of divinity throughout the entire universe, and that the qualities of the divine cannot be confined to only those that are deemed favourable. The Lord is both garden and graveyard, the slayer and the most benevolent one. The Almighty is impartial and ubiquitous.

In the hymn, Rudra is described as the most dreaded terroriser (frightening). Shri Rudram describes Rudra the Vedic deity as the personification of 'terror'. The name Rudra comes from ru, meaning 'Roar or howl' (the words dreaded or fearsome could only be used as adjectives to Rudra and not as Rudra because Rudra is the personification of terror) and dra, which is a superlative meaning 'the most'. So Rudra, depending on the poetic situation, can mean 'the most severe roarer/howler' or a hurricane or tempest or 'the most frightening one'.

== Rudra and Shiva ==
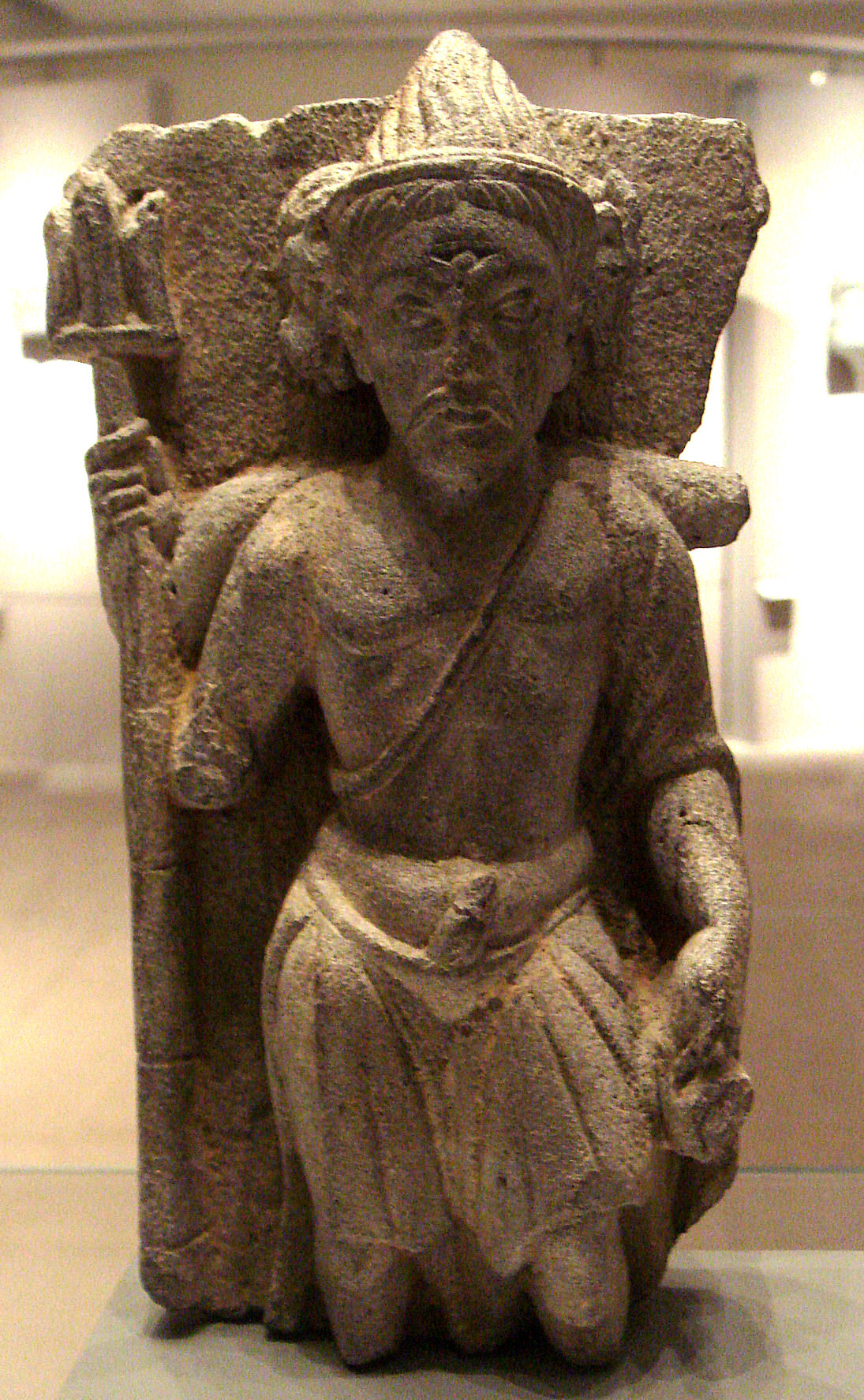
Three-headed Shiva, Gandhara, 2nd century AD

Shiva as known today shares many features with Rudra, and Shiva and Rudra are viewed as the same personality in Hindu scriptures. The two names are used synonymously. Rudra, the god of the roaring storm, is usually portrayed in accordance with the element he represents as a fierce, destructive deity.

The oldest surviving text of Hinduism is the Rig Veda, which is dated to between 1700 and 1100 BC based on linguistic and philological evidence. A god named Rudra is mentioned in the Rig Veda. The name Rudra is still used as a name for Shiva. In RV 2.33, he is described as the 'Father of the Rudras', a group of storm gods.

Hymn 10.92 of the Rigveda states that the deity Rudra has two natures, one wild and cruel (rudra), and another that is kind and tranquil (shiva). The Vedic texts mention a horse as the vehicle (vahana) of Rudra, the "Hero on horseback" that "should be indulgent" to the singer (RV. 2.33.1). Whereas post-Vedic texts such as the Mahabharata and the Puranas mention Nandi the bull and the zebu as the vehicles of Rudra and of Shiva, thereby unmistakably linking them as the same.

== In Buddhism ==
In Tibetan Buddhism, according to the Padma Thang Yig, Rudra are devas (beings who live in heaven) at Maheśvara heaven. Or formerly a human monk of noble origin named Koukuntri and then Tharpa Nakpo, who misunderstands dharma and engages in a life of vice and is condemned to Naraka. After 20,000 impure lives, he is eventually reborn as a demon in Sri Lanka by a prostitute who sleeps with three kinds of supernatural creatures, giving him three heads. His birth brings about plague and famine, so he is banished to a charnel ground, but he survives by devouring his mother's corpse and returns in order to conquer the world. Becoming the lover of the rakshasa queen Krodhishvari, he battles the gods, who are terrified of his extraordinary power and call the Buddhas and boddhisattvas for help.

The Buddha Vajrasattva, who in a previous life was Tharpa Nakpo's master Thupka Zhonu, receives the mission to destroy Rudra, for which he is accompanied by Vajrapani, himself a reborn Pramadeva or Denphak, Nakpo's servant and fellow disciple. They both assume the wrathful forms Hayagriva and Vajravarahi, who challenge Rudra with nine dances and battle him. Hayagriva turns diminutive and enters Rudra's anus, after which he becomes gigantic and destroys his body from inside out, submitting the demon and converting him to true dharma.

In another version, Hayagriva impersonates Rudra and impregnates Krodishvari. As a result, he is reborn as the resultant child, Vajrarakshasa. He takes over Rudra's realm and defeats him by plunging a three-pointed khaṭvāṅga into his chest. He then devours Rudra, purifies him in his stomach and excretes him as a protector of dharma, who hands over his army of demons to Vajrarakshasha as attendants. Other versions replace Hayagriva with Ucchusma, an emanation that Vajrapani draws from his own anus.

== In Sikhism ==
The 10th Sikh Guru, Guru Gobind Singh, describes the incarnation of Rudra in a composition titled 'Rudra Avtar' in his book the Dasam Granth.

== See also ==
- Rigvedic deities
- Rudra (spider), a genus of spiders named after the deity
- Rudra Sampradaya
- Vayu, Hindu wind god
- Fūjin, Shinto Kami of winds
- Aeolus (Odyssey)
- Rudrabhisheka
- Shiva
