= Shri Rudram =

Vedic chant in praise of Shiva

Shri Rudram (Sanskrit: श्रीरुद्रम् IAST: śrī-rudram), is a Vedic mantra or chant in homage to Rudra (an epithet of Shiva) taken from the Krishna Yajurveda's Taittiriya Samhita (TS 4.5, 4.7). In Shukla Yajurveda, it is found in Chapters 16 and 18. It is composed of two parts: the Namakam and Chamakam. Chamakam (Sanskrit: चमकम्) is added by scriptural tradition to the Shri Rudram. The text is important in Shaivism, where Shiva is viewed as the Parabrahman. The hymn is an early example of enumerating the names of a deity.

Shri Rudram is also famous for its mention of the Shaivite holy mantra Namah Shivaya, which appears in the text of the Śatarudrīya in the eighth anuvāka of Taittiriya Samhita (TS 4.5.8.1). In Shukla Yajurveda it is found in chapter 16, verse 41. It also contains the mantra Aum namo bhagavate rudraya and the Mahamrityunjaya Mantra.

The Sri Rudram is commonly chanted during the Pradosha time, which is considered to be a time auspicious for the worship of Shiva. There are some popular expiatory rites such as rudraikādaśinī, mahārudra and atirudra which employ the Shree Rudra mantra exclusively for pūjā japa and homa.

There are three major commentaries in Sanskrit for the Shree Rudra mantra (śatarudrīya) -those of Sāyaṇa Bhaṭṭabhāskara and Abhinavaśaṅkara.

== Contents ==
Shri Rudram consists of two chapters (praśna) from the fourth kāṇda (book) of Taittiriya Samhita which is a part of Krishna Yajurveda. The names of the chapters are Namakam (chapter five) and Chamakam (chapter seven) respectively. The Namakam (chapter five) in Shri Rudram describes the names or epithets of Rudra, who is a fear-inducing/destructive aspect of Shiva. The devotee asks for the benevolent and graceful aspect of Shiva to be invoked rather than the terrible and fierce aspect of Rudra and requests for the forgiveness of sins. The Chamakam (chapter seven) asks for the fulfillment of wishes. Each chapter consist of eleven anuvākas or hymns.

- Namakam: The Namakam in particular enumerates the various epithets and names of Rudra. It recognises the violent aspects of Rudra and requests him to be benevolent and peaceful, rather than violent and destructive. It also acknowledges the presence of the deity in those from all walks of life, be they carpenters (TS 4.5.1.2) or thieves (TS 4.5.3.2).
- Chamakam: The Chamakam enumerates the various things one would want in life and requests Rudra to grant them to the devotee. It acknowledges both material and spiritual desires and requests the deity for both. Some verses invoke other deities such as Agni and Vishnu and request them to join in the devotee's prayers to Rudra.

The anuvākas or hymns of Namakam correspond to the eleven hymns of TS 4.5, with the final hymn extended by an additional eight verses, including the Mahamrityunjaya Mantra. The mantra Om Namah Shivaya is derived from the Shri Rudram, in which it appears in the verses of TS 4.5.8 though without the syllable Om. The Chamakam consists of 11 anuvākas or hymns. The 11th anuvāka prayer (of the chamakam), brings out the long list of benedictions asked for in the odd divine number and even human numbering. The anuvākas or hymns of Chamakam correspond to TS 4.7 and they ask God for fulfillment of wishes.

The earliest homage hymns to Rudra is the Śatarudrīya found in the Shukla Yajurveda (Vajasaneyi Samhita 16.1-66). C. Fuller maintains that Shri Rudram is based on Śatarudrīya.

== See also ==
- Mahamrityunjaya Mantra
- Hara Hara Mahadeva
