= Mandala 2 =

Second book of the Rigveda

The second Mandala of the Rigveda has 43 hymns, mainly to Agni and Indra chiefly attributed to the Rishi gṛtsamada śaunohotra. It is one of the "family books" (mandalas 2–7), the oldest core of the Rigveda, which were composed in early vedic period (1500-1000 BCE).

Witzel (1995) on the basis of internal evidence suggested that the second Mandala contains the oldest hymns of the Rigveda.

== List of incipits ==
The dedication as given by Griffith is in square brackets

2.1 (192) [ Agni.] tvám agne dyúbhis tuvám āśuśukṣáṇis.
2.2 (193) [Agni.] yajñéna ? vardhata jātávedasam
2.3 (194) [ Apris.] sámiddho agnír níhitaḥ pṛthivyâm
2.4 (195) [Agni.] huvé vaḥ sudiyótmānaṃ suvṛktíṃ
2.5 (196) [Agni.] hótājaniṣṭa cétanaḥ
2.6 (197) [Agni.] imâm me agne samídham
2.7 (198) [Agni.] śréṣṭhaṃ yaviṣṭha bhārata
2.8 (199) [Agni.] vājayánn iva nû ráthān
2.9 (200) [Agni.] ní hótā hotṛṣádane vídānas
2.10 (201) [Agni.] johûtro agníḥ prathamáḥ pitéva
2.11 (202) [ Indra.] śrudhî hávam indra mâ riṣaṇyaḥ
2.12 (203) [Indra.] yó jātá evá prathamó mánasvān
2.13 (204) [Indra.] ṛtúr jánitrī tásyā apás pári
2.14 (205) [Indra.] ádhvaryavo bháraténdrāya sómam
2.15 (206) [Indra.] prá ghā nú asya maható mahâni
2.16 (207) [Indra.] prá vaḥ satâṃ jyéṣṭhatamāya suṣṭutím
2.17 (208) [Indra.] tád asmai návyam aṅgirasvád arcata
2.18 (209) [Indra.] prātâ rátho ? návo yoji sásniś
2.19 (210) [Indra.] ápāyi asya ándhaso mádāya
2.20 (211) [ Asvins.] vayáṃ te váya indra viddhí ṣú ṇaḥ
2.21 (212) viśvajíte dhanajíte suvarjíte
2.22 (213) [Indra.] tríkadrukeṣu mahiṣó yávāśiraṃ
2.23 (214) [ Brahmanaspati.] gaṇânāṃ tvā gaṇápatiṃ havāmahe
2.24 (215) [Brahmanaspati.] sémâm aviḍḍhi prábhṛtiṃ yá îśiṣe
2.25 (216) [Brahmanaspati.] índhāno agníṃ vanavad vanuṣyatáḥ
2.26 (217) [Brahmanaspati.] ṛjúr íc cháṃso vanavad vanuṣyató
2.27 (218) [ Adityas.] imâ gíra ādityébhyo ghṛtásnūḥ
2.28 (219) [ Varuna.] idáṃ kavér ādityásya svarâjo
2.29 (220) [ Visvedevas.] dhŕtavratā âditiyā íṣirā
2.30 (221) [Indra and Others.] ṛtáṃ devâya kṛṇvaté savitrá
2.31 (222) [Visvedevas.] asmâkam mitrāvaruṇāvataṃ rátham
2.32 (223) [Various Deities.] asyá me dyāvāpṛthivī ṛtāyató
2.33 (224) [ Rudra.] â te pitar marutāṃ sumnám etu
2.34 (225) [ Maruts.] dhārāvarâ marúto dhṛṣṇúojaso
2.35 (226) [ Son of Waters.] úpem asṛkṣi vājayúr vacasyâṃ
2.36 (227) [Various Gods.] túbhyaṃ hinvānó vasiṣṭa gâ apó
2.37 (228) [Various Gods.] mándasva hotrâd ánu jóṣam ándhaso
2.38 (229) [ Savitar.] úd u ṣyá deváḥ savitâ savâya
2.39 (230) grâvāṇeva tád íd árthaṃ jarethe
2.40 (231) [ Soma and Pusan.] sómāpūṣaṇā jánanā rayīṇâṃ
2.41 (232) [Various Deities.] vâyo yé te sahasríṇo
2.42 (233) [ Kapinjala.] kánikradaj janúṣam prabruvāṇá
2.43 (234) [Kapinjala.] pradakṣiníd abhí gṛṇanti kārávo
