= Gritsamada =

Sage in the Rigveda

Religious life
- Religion: Historical Vedic religion
- Composed most hymns of Mandala 2 of the Rigveda

Gritsamada (Sanskrit: गृत्समद/गृत्समाद, IAST: Gṛtsamada/Gṛtsamāda), was a Rigvedic sage. Most of Mandala 2 of the Rigveda is attributed to him. He was the son of Śunahotra Āṅgirasa and the adopted son of Śunaka Bhārgava. According to Witzel, Somāhuti Bhārgava is a descendant of Gritsamada, because Somāhuti states that he is one among the Gritsamadas. However according to Jamison and Brereton he belongs to the Bhṛgu lineage of Gṛtsamada's adopted father Śunaka. The signature line of the Gritsamadas in the Rigveda was बृहद्वदेम विदथे सुवीराः lit. 'May we speak loftily at the ritual distribution, in possession of good heroes.' Gritsamada was known for connecting the deeds of Indra to the actions of the ritual.

== Legend ==
In the Bṛhaddevatā, Gritsamada is stated to have become as large and strong as Indra through penances, which led to the daityas Dhuni and Cumiri to mistake him for such. When Gritsamada realized their hostile intentions, he praised Indra with hymns so that Indra could defeat them. According to the late medieval commentator Sayana, Gritsamada was captured by asuras and was released on Indra's command and by his was made the son of Śunaka Bhārgava. In the Mahābhārata, not Vasishtha but Varishtha, curses Gritsamada to be a wild animal as a result of Gritsamada faltering in the recitation of formulae in a sacrifice. He cursed that he would be an animal divested of intelligence, subject to grief, ever filled with fear and that he would be an animal for ten thousand years with ten and eight hundred years in addition. However, Śiva restores him to his normal form and grants him immortality. Gritsamada later shared this story to Yudhishthira.
