= Rashtrapati =

Rashtrapati may refer to:

- President of India (Hindi: राष्ट्रपति, romanized: Rāṣṭrapati)
- Rashtrapati Award
- Rashtrapati Nilayam, the official winter retreat of the President of India

== See also ==
- Rashtrapati Bhavan (disambiguation)
