= Kshetrapati =

kṣétrapati (or kṣétrasya páti) "lord of the field" is the name of a tutelary deity in the Rigveda (RV 4.57, RV 7.35, RV 10.66) and Atharvaveda (AVŚ 2.8.5). Also feminine, kṣétrasya pátnī "mistress of the soil", and kṣétrāṇām páti, AVŚ 2.12.l, VS 16.18.
