= Shiva Sahasranama =

Hindu religious hymn

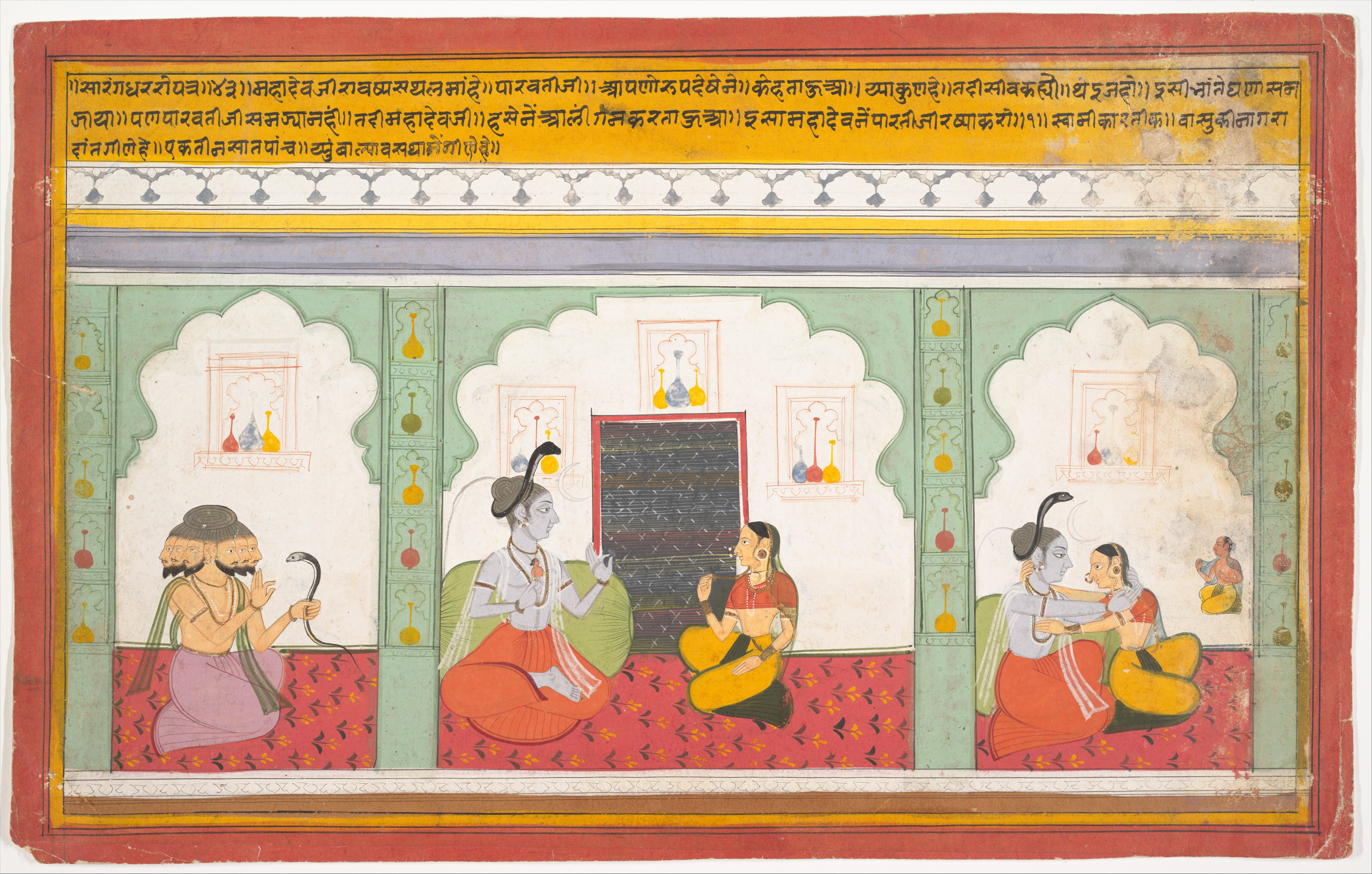
Page from a Dispersed Shiva Mahatmya (Great Tales of Shiva)

The Shiva Sahasranama (Sanskrit: शिवसहस्रनाम, romanized: śivasahasranāma) is a Sanskrit hymn that contains a list of the 1,000 names of Shiva, one of the principal deities of Hinduism and the supreme being in Shaivism. In Hindu tradition, a sahasranama is a type of devotional hymn (Sanskrit: stotram) listing the thousand names of a deity. The names provide an exhaustive catalog of the attributes, functions, and major mythology associated with the figure being praised. The Shiva Sahasranama is found in the Shiva Mahapurana, and many other scriptures, such as Linga Purana.

== Variations ==
There are at least eight different variations of the Shiva Sahasranama while the one appearing in the Book 13 (Anushasana Parva) of the Mahabharata is considered to be the main version. One version is contained in the Linga Purana, while another version occurs in the Mahabharata.
