= Vasukra =

Vásukra is a rishi with patronymic Aindra, author of RV 10.27, 29, and part of 28, and the name of another rishi, son of Vasishtha, author of two verses or more RV 9.97.28-30.

Vásukrapatnī "wife of Vaskura" is the name of the author of the verse RV 10.28.1.
