= Hara Hara Mahadeva =

Hindu invocation to Shiva

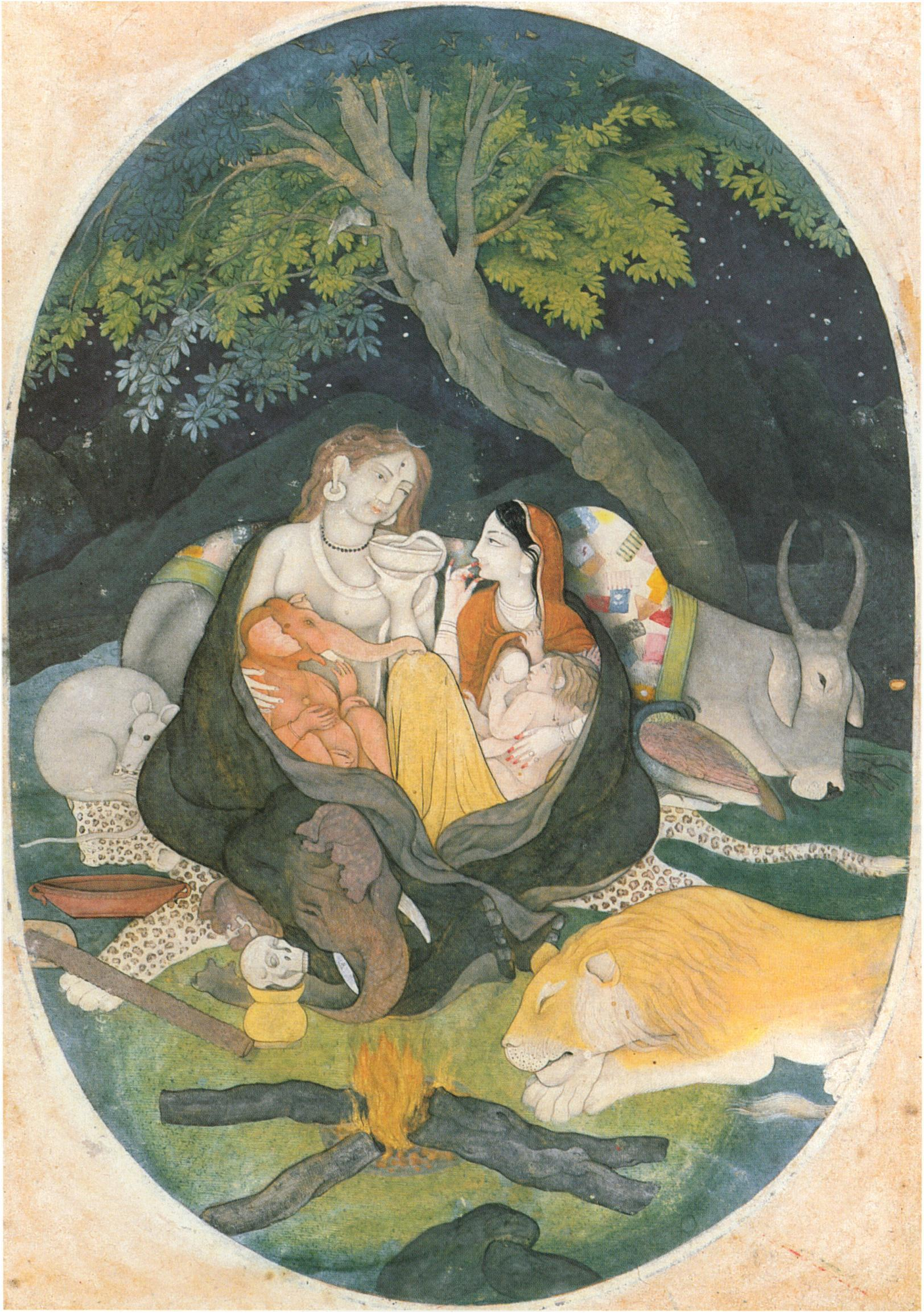
Painting of Shiva and his family, Government Museum and Art Gallery, Chandigarh.

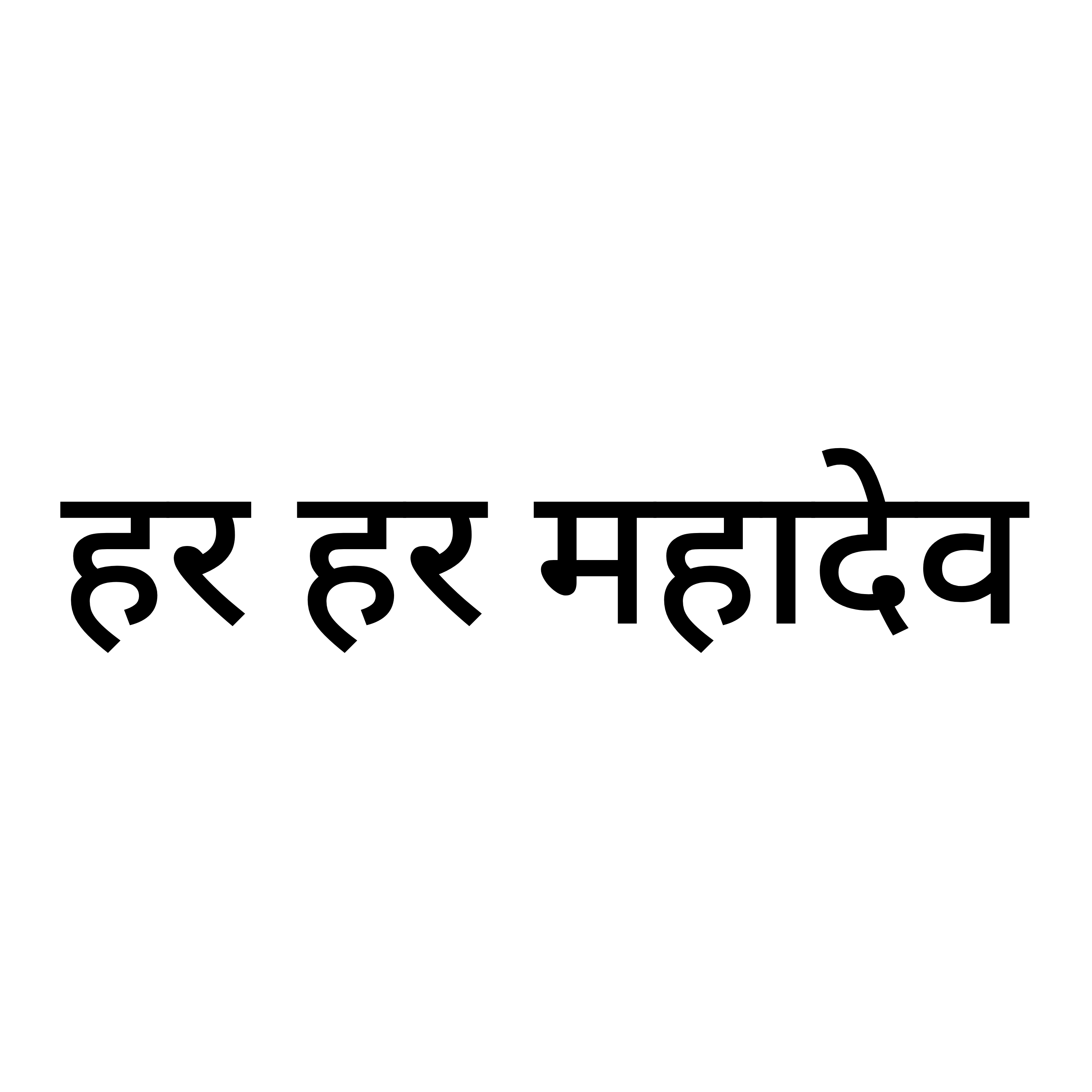
Hara Hara Mahadeva written in Devanagari

Hara Hara Mahadeva (Sanskrit: हर हर महादेव, romanized: hara hara mahādēva) is a Sanskrit invocation in praise of the Hindu deity Shiva. The invocation consists of two epithets of Shiva, hara and mahadeva. It is generally chanted by adherents during auspicious occasions, such as prayer and entering a Shiva temple.

The invocation was chanted by the legendary queen Padmini and tens of thousands of women when they performed the practice of jauhar to save their honour from Alauddin Khalji. It was also used as a war cry of the soldiers and kings of the Maratha empire.

== See also ==
- Hare Krishna
- Hari Om
- Jai Shri Ram
- Jai Shri Krishna
- Om Namah Shivaya
