= Shiva Panchakshara Stotra =

Hindu hymn

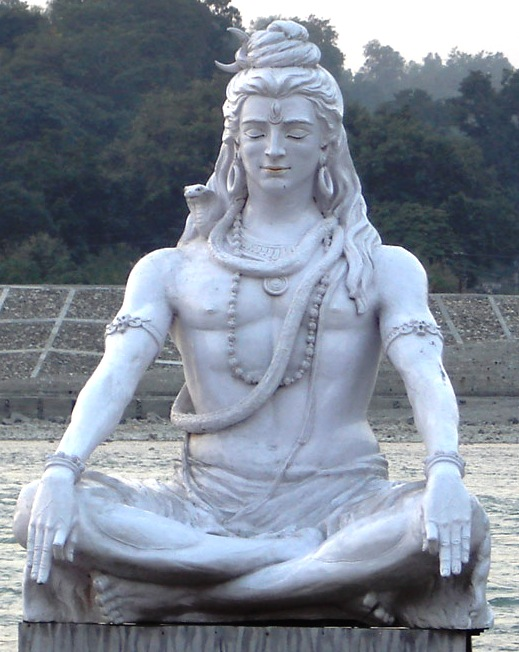
Statue of Shiva, the addressee of the Shiva Panchakshara Stotram

The Shiva Panchakshara Stotra (Sanskrit: शिवपञ्चाक्षरस्तोत्र, romanized: śiva-pañcākṣara-stotra, lit. 'Hymn to the five syllables of Shiva') is a Hindu religious hymn (stotra) dedicated to god Shiva. Comprising five stanzas (ślokas), it is regarded to have been composed by the philosopher Adi Shankara.

== Description ==
The panchakshara (Sanskrit: पञ्चाक्षर) literally means "five syllables" in Sanskrit. The Shiva Panchakshara Stotra refers to the five syllables 'Na', 'Ma', 'Shi', 'Vā', and 'Ya' that form the mantra Om Namah Shivaya, and explains their significance and their connection to the deity.

According to some texts, these five syllables are regarded to represent the five great elements in the human body, and it is believed that chanting them energizes these elements. 'Na' is related to Prithvi (earth), 'Ma' to Jala (water), 'Shi' to Agni (fire), 'Vā' to Vāyu (air), and 'Ya' to Ākāsha (space).

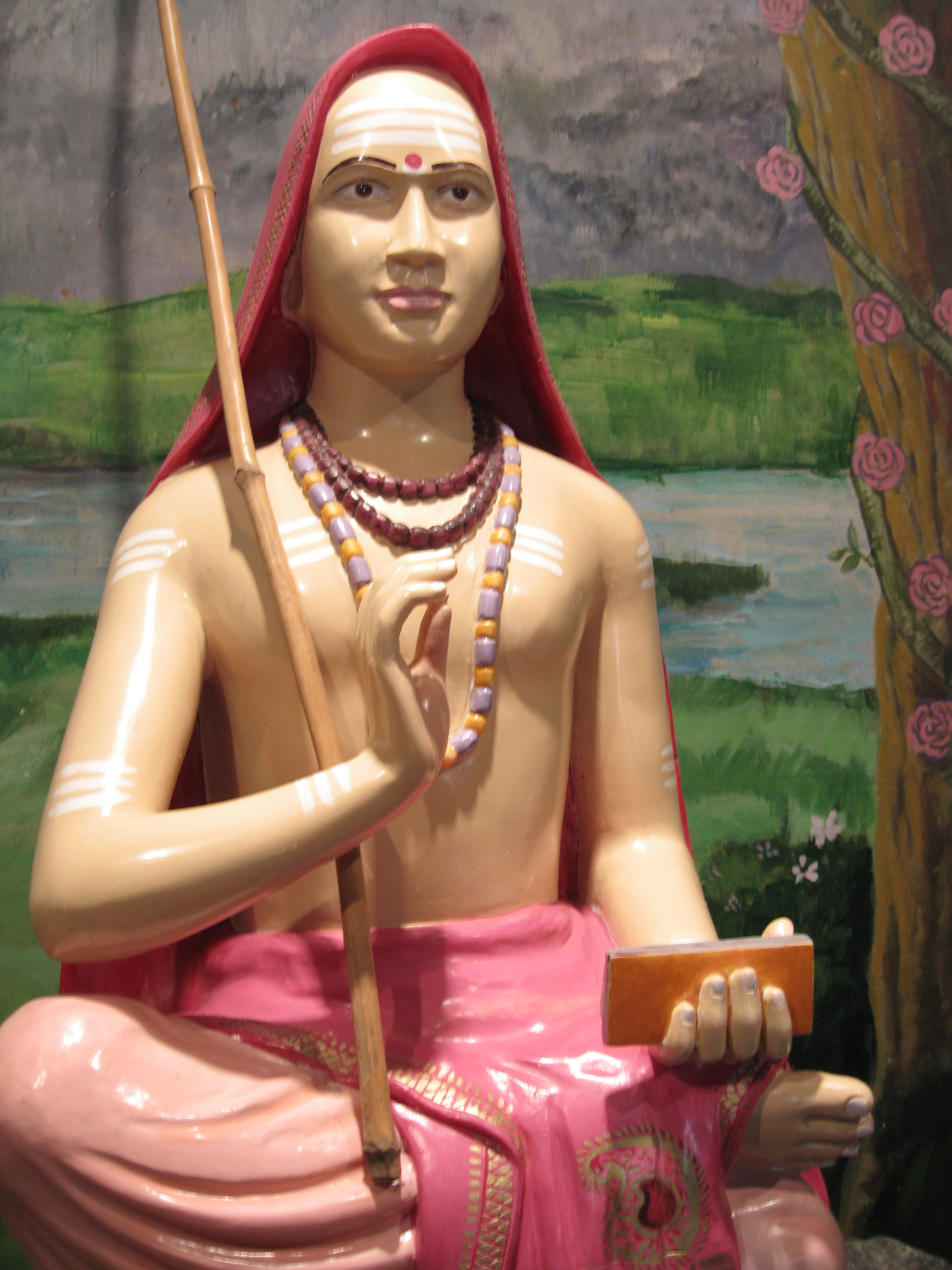
Adi Shankara, regarded to be the author of this work

== Hymn ==
The Shiva Panchakshara Stotram is composed of five ślokas (stanzas), each of which is dedicated to one of the syllables of the Panchakshara mantra: "Na-Ma-Shi-Vā-Ya".

=== First stanza (Na) ===
Original Sanskrit

नागेन्द्रहाराय त्रिलोचनाय
भस्माङ्गरागाय महेश्वराय।
नित्याय शुद्धाय दिगम्बराय
तस्मै नकाराय नमः शिवाय॥

IAST transcription

nāgēndrahārāya trilōcanāya
bhasmāṅgarāgāya mahēśvarāya
nityāya śuddhāya digambarāya
tasmai nakārāya namaḥ śivāya

English translation

To the one wearing a garland of the chief of serpents, to the three-eyed one
To the one with the beauty of ashes on his body, to the great lord
To the eternal, to the immaculate, to the one clothed in space
To him, to the one with the letter "na", salutations to Shiva!

=== Second Stanza (Ma) ===
Original Sanskrit

मन्दाकिनीसलिलचन्दनचर्चिताय
नन्दीश्वरप्रमथनाथमहेश्वराय।
मन्दारपुष्पबहुपुष्पसुपूजिताय
तस्मै मकाराय नमः शिवाय॥

IAST transcription

mandākinīsalilacandanacarcitāya
nandīśvarapramathanāthamaheśvarāya
mandārapuṣpabahupuṣpasupūjitāya
tasmai makārāya namaḥ śivāya

English translation

To the one anointed with the waters of the Mandakini river and sandal paste,
To the lord of Nandi and the Pramathas, the great god,
To the one worshipped with mandara flowers and many other flowers,
To him, to the one with the letter "ma", salutations to Shiva!

=== Third stanza (Shi) ===
Original Sanskrit

शिवाय गौरीवदनाब्जवृन्द
सूर्य्योत्तमं पङ्कजहस्त्वलये।
सर्ववेदसारसहितं महादेवं
तस्मै शिकाराय नमः शिवाय॥

IAST transcription

śivāya gaurīvadanābjavr̥nda
sūryyottamam paṅkajahastvalaye
sarvavedasārasahitaṃ mahādevaṃ
tasmai śikārāya namaḥ śivāya

English translation

To Shiva, whose lotus feet are worshipped by Gauri's face-lotuses,
To the one with the sun and moon as eyes, and the lotus in hand in the orbit,
To the great god who embodies the essence of all Vedas,
To him, to the one with the letter "shi", salutations to Shiva!

=== Fourth stanza (Va) ===
Original Sanskrit

वसिष्ठकुम्भोद्भवगौतम आर्य
मुनीन्द्र देवार्चित शेखराय।
चर्माम्बर धाररिणे शशिवक्त्राय
तस्मै विकाराय नमः शिवाय॥

IAST transcription

vasiṣṭhakumbhodbhavagautamārya
munīndradevārcitaśekharāya
carmāmbardhāriṇe śaśivaktrāya
tasmai vikārāya namaḥ śivāya

English translation

To the one worshipped by the sages Vasistha, Agastya, Gautama, and other great ones,
To the crown worshipped by gods and the best of sages,
To the one wearing elephant hide, with the moon on his forehead,
To him, to the one with the letter "va", salutations to Shiva!

=== Fifth stanza (Ya) ===
Original Sanskrit

यज्ञस्वरूपाय जटाधराय
नित्याय शुद्धाय पिनाकिने।
पशूनां पतये नमः शिवाय
तस्मै यकाराय नमः शिवाय॥

IAST transcription

yajñasvarūpāya jaṭādharāya
nityāya śuddhāya pinākine
paśūnāṃ pataye namaḥ śivāya
tasmai yakārāya namaḥ śivāya

English translation

To the one who is the embodiment of sacrifice, with matted hair,
To the eternal, pure one, bearer of the Pinaka bow,
To the lord of all beings, salutations to Shiva,
To him, to the one with the letter "ya", salutations to Shiva!

== See also ==
- Shiva Tandava Stotra
- Ashtalakshmi Stotra
- Dvadasha Stotra
