= Mandala 7 =

Seventh book of the Rigveda

The seventh Mandala of the Rigveda ("book 7", "RV 7") has 104 hymns. In the Rigveda Anukramani, all hymns in this book are attributed to Vashista. Hymn 32 is additionally credited to Sakti Vashista, and hymns 101-102 (to Parjanya) are additionally credited to Kumara Agneya. It is one of the "family books" (mandalas 2-7), the oldest core of the Rigveda, which were composed in early vedic period (1500-1000 BCE).

The hymns are dedicated to Agni, Indra, the Visvadevas, the Maruts, Mitra-Varuna, the Asvins, Ushas (Dawn), Indra-Varuna, Varuna, Vayu (Wind), two each to Sarasvati, Rudra, the Waters, the Adityas, Vishnu, Vastospati, Brhaspati, one each to the Apris, to Vashista, Savitar, Bhaga, the Dadhikras, the Rbhus, Dyaus and Prthivi (Heaven and Earth), Parjanya (Rain) and Indra-Soma. 7.103 is dedicated to the frogs.

The rivers mentioned in the 7th Mandala are the Sarasvati, Asikni, Parusni and possibly the Yamuna (in 7.18.19 the name of a helper of Indra, maybe also the name of a woman or goddess). Hymns 95 and 96 are entirely dedicated to Sarasvati.

The verse 7.59.12, probably a late addition, gained importance as Mahāmrityunjaya Mantra or Tryambakam mantra.

== The battle of ten kings ==
The Battle of the Ten Kings (dāśarājñá) is a battle alluded to in the Rigveda (Book 7, hymns 18, 33 and 83.4-8), the ancient Indian sacred collection of Sanskrit hymns. The battle took place during the middle or main Vedic period, near the Ravi River in Punjab. It was a battle between the Puru kingdom, allied with other tribes of the northwestern India, guided by the royal sage Vishvamitra, and the Bharata king Sudas, who defeated the Purus.
