= Ribhus =

Hindu deities of the solar sphere

Ribhus (Sanskrit: ऋभु, ṛbhu, also Arbhu, Rbhus, Ribhukshan) are deities of ancient India whose referent has evolved over time. In early layers of the Vedic literature, it referred to a sun deity. It evolved to being a wind deity, thereafter referred to three male artisans whose abilities and austerities make them into divinities in later Vedic texts. Their individual names were Ribhu, Vaja and Vibhvan (also called Vibhu), but they were collectively called Ribhus (ṛbhúḥ, pl. ṛbhávaḥ), also called Ribhukshan) (ṛbhukṣā). Their name's meaning might be "clever, skillful, inventive, prudent", cognate to Gothic arbaiþs "labour, toil"; or alternatively to English elf, originally meaning "shining, white."

Ribhus are depicted in some legends of the Vedic literature as three sons of the goddess of morning light named Saranyu and Hindu god Indra. In other legends, such as in the Atharvaveda, they are sons of Sudhanvan, which means good archer. In either legends, they are famous for their creative abilities, innovation and they design chariots, the magic cow of plenty, channels for rivers, and tools for Indra and other gods, which makes many envious. In later Hindu mythology, the Ribhus are born in human form who then bring their innovation to earth, remain humble and kind. This makes some gods angry and the Ribhus are refused entry back to heaven. Other gods intervene and make the inventive Ribhus immortal. They are revered in ancient Hindu texts as sages, as stars, or rays of the sun.

== Origin and meaning ==
The Ribhus were first mentioned in the oldest Hindu scriptures of the Rigveda, wherein eleven hymns are dedicated to them (RV 1.20, 110, 111, 161, RV 3.60, RV 4.33-37, RV 7.48), and the Atharvaveda. They are said to be the sons of Sudhanvan, a descendant of Angiras. In later Hindu mythology (Vishnu Purana Book 2, Chapters 15 - 16 and the Song of Ribhu) Ribhu, supposed to be the leader of them, is said to be a son of Brahma. Unlike that identification the "Puranic Encyclopedia" states that this Ribhu is not identical with the leader of the Ribhus whose name therein is Rbhuksan. They are supposed to dwell in the solar sphere; Aitareya Brahmana III, 30 describes them as "sun's neighbours or pupils".

== Works ==
The Ribhus are artists who formed the horses of Indra, the carriage of the Ashvins, and the miraculous cow of Brihaspati, made their parents young, and performed other wonderful works which according to RV 4.51.6 were "done by the dawn". According to Yaska they also founded the sacrifices. They are supposed to take their ease and remain every year for twelve days idle in the house of Agohya (an appellation of Aditya which means "one who cannot be concealed", therefore the Sun). When the Devas (gods) heard of their skill, they sent Agni to them, bidding them, to construct four cups from the one cup of Tvashtar, the artificer of the devas. When the Ribhus successfully had executed this task, the devas received them among themselves, gave them immortality and allowed them to partake of their sacrifices.

== Interpretations ==
=== Three Seasons ===
According to Yaska and Sayana the Ribhus represent the rays of the sun. David Frawley states about that notion, that "Vedic gods, like the Adityas, Maruts, Vasus and Rhibhus, often appear as rays of the sun, as stars or constellations" Bal Gangadhar Tilak, stating that the interpretation of Yaska and Sayana could not explain their number, interpreted them 1893 referring to "several European scholars" as representing the three seasons of the year of the early Vedic period. The Satapata Brahmana XIV.I.1.28 mentions "three divisions of the year" and in RV 1.164.48 the "three spokes" are supposed to mean this three seasons. But Tilak didn't show a relation of their name and works to this interpretation. So Arthur Berriedale Keith 1925 mentioned that "the assertion that the Rbhus are really the Rthus" (the seasons) "is not 'in the slightest degree plausible'".

=== Twelve intercalary Days ===
==== Description ====
According to Bal Gangadhar Tilak referring to RV 1.161.13 the twelve days, when the Ribhus rested at the house of Agohya, took place "at the end of the year". He describes them as the holiest days of the year of which the ancestors of today's Indians believed, that the devas then would leave heaven to visit the homes of the humans. As David Frawley mentioned in context of the seasons, according to RV 7.103.7 - 8 also as the long Atiratra rite of Soma was celebrated at this time.

Bal Gangadhar Tilak further interpreted the hound or dog, which according to RV 1.161.13 woke the Ribhus, as the "dogstar" Sirius, which appears at the vernal equinox "at the end of the Pitriyana". The "Pitriyana" (meaning "the path of the fathers", called Pitrs), are the six southern signs of the Zodiak, by Tilak also called "the eternal waters of Yamaloka". Illustrative Maitrayani Upanishad VI, 1 describes the year as divided into two halfes, one of which belongs to Agni (Fire) and the other to Varuna (Water). Thus according to Bal Gangadhar Tilak in 1893 the year started at the time of the Rigveda at the vernal equinox and the Ribhus recommenced working after their awakening in the beginning of the new year. William Dwight Whitney 1895 rejected this interpretation by Tilak. In this context Tilak also pointed to the fact that because of RV 1.161.13 not the solar year but the anticlockwise movement of the precession of the equinoxes must be meant which he calls an "equinoctial year", but he didn't refer to this in his further interpretation.

==== Interpretation ====
Bal Gangadhar Tilak then interpreted also in 1893 the Period of twelve days as the twelve intercalary days, to fix the difference between the lunar year of 354 days and the solar year of 366 days. While he interpreted the beginning of the year at the vernal equinox, Arthur Anthony Macdonell 1917 stated that the twelve intercalary days "in all probability" were inserted at the winter solstice. A.B. Keith 1925 also criticized Tilak's interpretation by pointing to "... the fact that a year of 360 days and 12 months is ... the only year clearly known to the whole of Vedic literature prior to the late Sutras". Because he also "admits that ancient Indians had knowledge of intercalation" his statements on that point are considered "confused". But already 1895 a similar view in terms of the length of the year was stated by George Thibaut and W.D. Whitney in Indian Antiquity. In 1960 Narendra Nath Law wrote in Indian Antiquity Quarterly that: "W<hitney> would be correct if the 7th season or the 13th month (presumably for intercalation) had not been mentionend." He was referring to RV 1.164.15 which was interpreted by H.H. Wilson as describing seven seasons. But according to the translation of Ralph Thomas Hotchkin Griffith RV 1.164.15 means the seven Rishis, which according to David Frawley were actually eight seers, representing the Big Dipper. The eighth star of the big dipper is according to his later reference to RV 3.56.2 in connexion with RV 1.164.15 not the unseen fourth star of the handle forming a double star system but the Pole Star around which the big dipper rotates. Already Moritz Winternitz 1907 pointed "to the fact that there are certain passages in the Vedic texts which admid of various interpretations." So A.B. Keith's and A.A. Macdonell's 1912 statement is still applicable, the 12 days were "merely the 'reflexion of the year' (samvatsarasya pratima) in the same way that they represent the twelve months and have no relation to chronology at all."
