= God and gender in Hinduism =

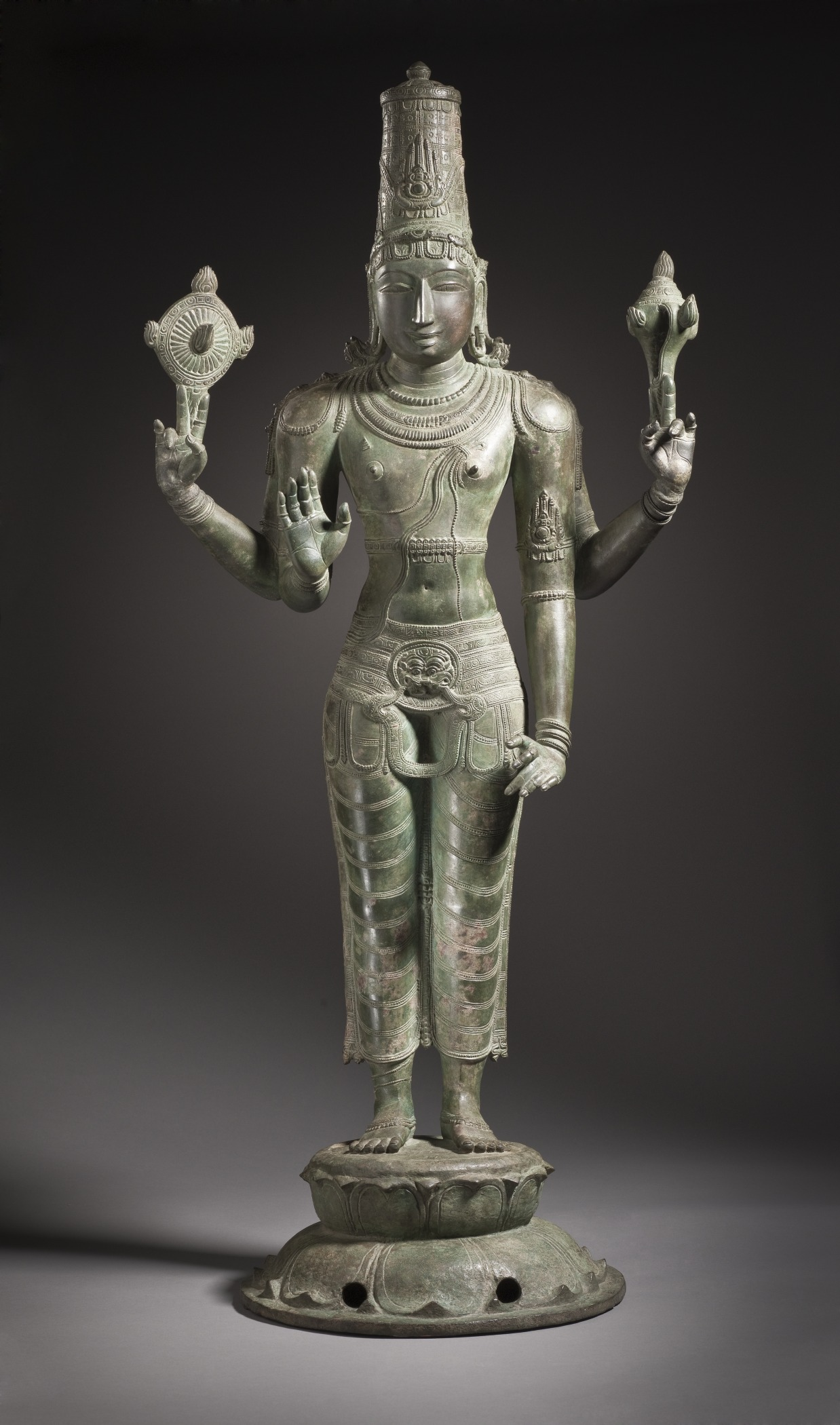
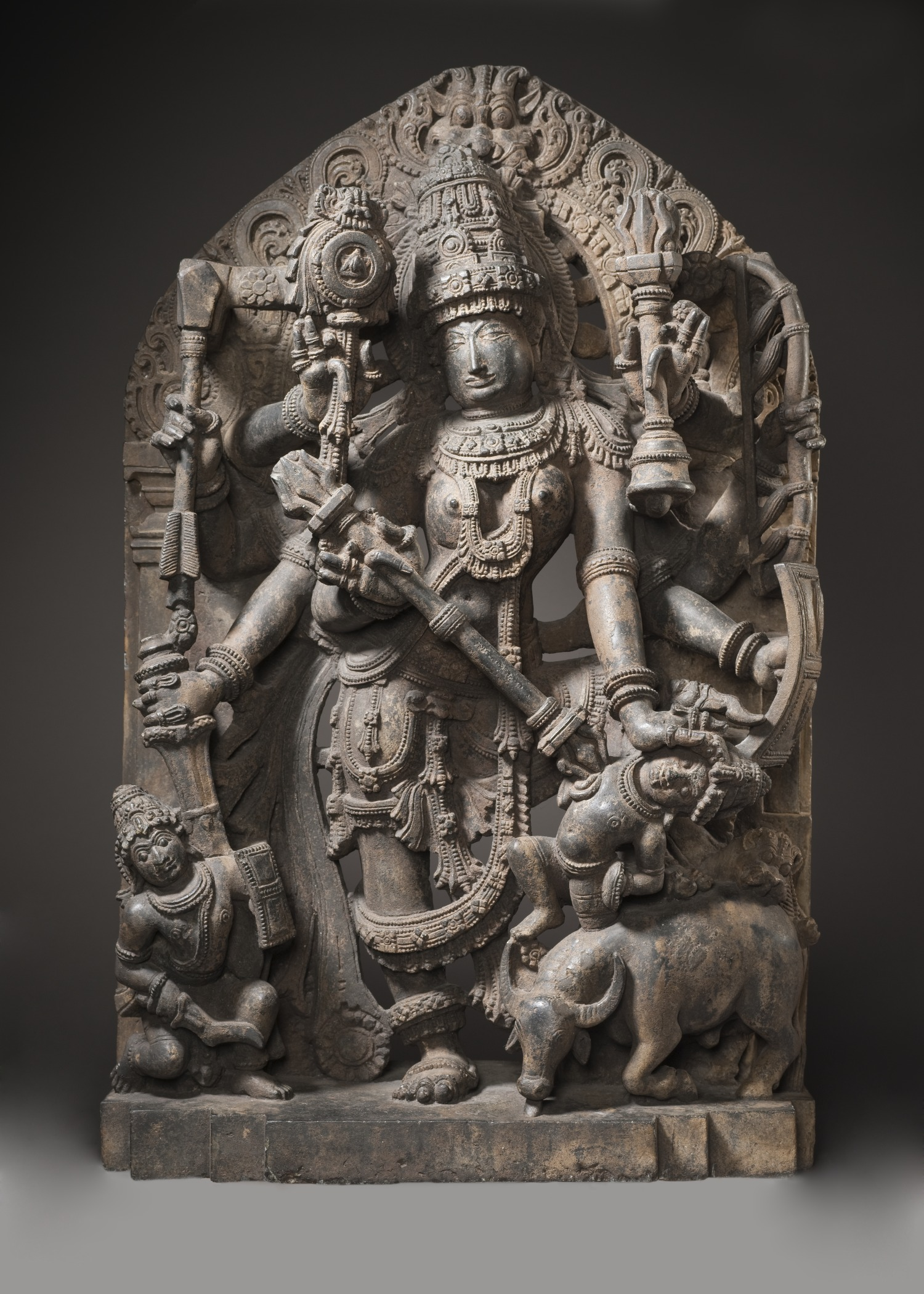
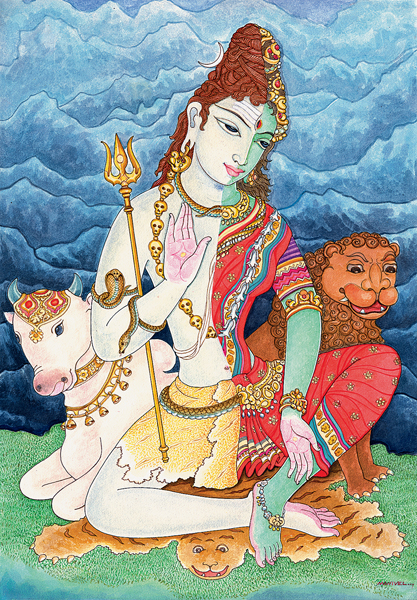
In Hinduism, god is sometimes visualized as a male god such as Shiva (left), or goddess such as Durga (center), bigender such as Ardhanarishvara (a composite of Shiva - male - and Parvati - female) (right), or as formless and genderless Brahman (Universal Absolute, Supreme Self as Oneness in everyone).

In Hinduism, there are diverse approaches to conceptualizing God and gender. Many Hindus focus upon the impersonal Absolute (Brahman) which is genderless. Other Hindu traditions conceive God as bigender (both female and male), alternatively as either male or female, while cherishing gender henotheism, that is without denying the existence of other gods in either gender.

The Shakta tradition conceives of God as a female and the Divine Absolute Mother. Other Bhakti traditions of Hinduism have both male and female gods. In ancient and medieval Indian mythology, each masculine deva of the Hindu pantheon is partnered with a feminine who is often a devi.

== Literature ==
Male and female deities are extensively mentioned in the Vedas. The earliest mandalas ("Books"; the authorship of each mandala is traditionally ascribed to a particular rishi or that rishi's family) of the Rigveda, estimated to have been composed sometime in the 2nd millennium BCE, invoke and praise both gods and goddesses. Ushas ("Goddess of Dawns") is praised in twenty Hymns of Chapters VI.64, VI.65, VII.78 and X.172, with Hymn VI.64.5 declaring goddess Ushas as the one who must be worshipped first.

Hymn to Ushas (Abridged):
The shining tints of the Dawn have spread like the waves of the waters,
Beautifying the world, she renders all good roads easy to traverse,
She who is replete with delight, excellence and health,
Divine Ushas, though art seen auspicious, thou shinest afar,
thy bright rays spread over the sky, lovely and radiant with great splendour;
Do thou Ushas bring me opulence, daughter of heaven;
thou who art divine, who art lovely, who art to be worshipped at the first daily rite;
At thy dawning, divine Ushas, birds fly from their resting places, men arise to work;
Thou, divine Ushas, bring ample wealth to the mortal, the offerer of these prayers.

— Rigveda, VI.64

Goddesses, other than Ushas, mentioned in early Vedic literature include Prthivi (earth), Aditi (mother of gods, abundance), Sarasvati (river, nourishment), Vac (sound and speech), and Nirrti (death, destruction). Similarly male gods feature prominently in the Vedas, with Indra (rain, lightning), Agni (fire), Varuna (rta, law), Dyaus (sky, virility), Savitr (Surya, sun), and Soma (drink) some of the most mentioned. The two deities most mentioned in Rigveda are Indra and Agni, both male. Surya is the third most revered god, again a male. Each is mentioned, anywhere rain and fire is evoked. They are profusely praised, with ceremonies and prayers to all gods and goddesses symbolically organized around fire (Agni yajna). The hymns seek strengthening of fire, and it is god Indra who increases the energy of the fire, while god Surya increases his brightness. Max Muller states that, while there are difference in frequency of mentions, gods and goddesses in Rig veda are "neither superior nor inferior; almost every one is represented as supreme and absolute".

Gross states that ancient and medieval Hindu literature is richly endowed with gods, goddesses and androgynous representations of God. This, states Gross, is in contrast with several monotheistic religions, where God is often synonymous with "He" and theism is replete with male anthropomorphisms. In Hinduism, goddess-imagery does not mean loss of male-god, rather the ancient literature presents the two genders as balancing each other and complementary. The Goddesses in Hinduism, states Gross, are strong, beautiful and confident, symbolizing their vitality in cycle of life. While masculine Gods are symbolically represented as those who act, the feminine Goddesses are symbolically portrayed as those who inspire action. Goddesses in Hinduism are envisioned as the patrons of arts, culture, nurture, learning, arts, joys, spirituality and liberation.

God is not either male or female concept in ancient Indian literature. Androgynous concepts of god are common place as well.

=== Brahman ===
Most major schools of Hindu philosophy focus their philosophical discourse on the Universal Absolute, called Brahman, which is a grammatically genderless noun. This Universal Absolute, states Zimmer, is "beyond the differentiating qualifications of sex, beyond any and all limitations, individualizing characteristics whatsoever". The Brahman is the Great Cosmic Spirit, the Ultimate True Reality, the Supreme Self. It is a transcendental concept that includes all virtues, forms, genders, characteristics, capacities, knowledge and being-ness. The history of the genderless concept of Brahman, as the omnipresent Absolute Spirit and Supreme Self, can be traced back to Vedas, and extensively in the earliest Upanishads, such as hymns 1.4.10 and 4.4.5 of Brihadaranyaka Upanishad, and hymn 6.2.1 of Chandogya Upanishad 6.2.1.

Zimmer clarifies the notion of gender in Sanskrit language and its relation to the concepts of Brahman and God in Hinduism, as follows:

It must be understood that in Sanskrit, grammatical gender is not always a sign of physical sex. Gender infers function, sex infers form; so that an individual may be masculine from one point of view and feminine from another. (...) Brahman can be regarded as the "womb" of life, and as in Christianity "this man" and "this woman" are equally "feminine to God" [in Hinduism]. Absolutely, Brahman, although grammatically neuter, is the principle of all such differentiation. Essence and nature are respectively masculine and feminine, logically distinct, but "one in God," who is neither this nor that [in Hinduism], and therefore "It" rather than "He" or "She" specifically.

— Heinrich Zimmer, Myths and Symbols in Indian Art and Civilization

== Mythology ==
Hindu mythology incorporates numerous devas (gods) and devis (goddesses). These are symbolic stories that synthesize God and gender, with ideas and values. The Vishnu Purana, for example, recites one such myth describes gods and goddesses with names that are loaded with symbolism. An excerpt of the story is as follows,

The progeny of Dharma by the daughters of Daksha were as follows: by Sraddhá (devotion) he had Kama (desire); by Lakshmí (wealth, prosperity), was born Darpa (pride); by Dhriti (courage), the progeny was Niyama (precept); by Tusht́i (inner comfort), Santosha (contentment); by Pusht́i (opulence), the progeny was Lobha (cupidity, greed); by Medhá (wisdom, experience), Sruta (sacred tradition); by Kriyá (hard work, labour), the progeny were Dańd́a, Naya, and Vinaya (justice, politics, and education); by Buddhi (intellect), Bodha (understanding); by Lajjá (shame, humility), Vinaya (good behaviour); by Vapu (body, strength), Vyavasaya (perseverance). Shanti (peace) gave birth to Kshama (forgiveness); Siddhi (excellence) to Sukha (enjoyment); and Kírtti (glorious speech) gave birth to Yasha (reputation). These were the sons of Dharma; one of whom, Kama (love, emotional fulfillment) had baby Hersha (joy) by his wife Nandi (delight).

The wife of Adharma (vice, wrong, evil) was Hinsá (violence), on whom he begot a son Anrita (falsehood), and a daughter Nikriti (immorality): they intermarried, and had two sons, Bhaya (fear) and Naraka (hell); and twins to them, two daughters, Máyá (deceit) and Vedaná (torture), who became their wives. The son of Bhaya (fear) and Máyá (deceit) was the destroyer of living creatures, or Mrityu (death); and Dukha (pain) was the offspring of Naraka (hell) and Vedaná (torture). The children of Mrityu were Vyádhi (disease), Jará (decay), Soka (sorrow), Trishńa (greediness), and Krodha (wrath). These are all called the inflictors of misery, and are characterised as the progeny of Vice (Adharma). They are all without wives, without posterity, without the faculty to procreate; they perpetually operate as causes of the destruction of this world. On the contrary, Daksha and the other Rishis, the elders of mankind, tend perpetually to influence its renovation: whilst the Manus and their sons, the heroes endowed with mighty power, and treading in the path of truth, as constantly contribute to its preservation.

— Vishnu Purana, Chapter 7, Translated by Horace Hayman Wilson

== Examples ==
=== Smarta and Advaita ===
The Smarta tradition, which by and large, follows Advaita philosophy believes all forms, male and female, to be different forms of the impersonal Absolute, Brahman which is of neuter gender and can never be defined. Brahman is viewed as without personal attributes (Nirguna Brahman) or with attributes (Saguna Brahman, equated with Ishvara) as God. In Advaita Vedanta, Ishvara is Brahman. Thus according to Smarta views, the divine can be with attributes, Saguna Brahman, and also be viewed with whatever attributes, (e.g., a goddess) a devotee conceives.

=== Shiva and Vishnu ===
In Vaishnavism and Shaivism, God, Vishnu or Shiva respectively, is personified as male. God, however, transcends gender in these sub-schools, and the male form is used as an icon to help focus the Puja (worship). The use of icons is not restricted to male forms. It takes various forms and shapes. The Shaivites and Vaishnavites worship God in non-anthropomorphic, symbolic male-female images as well, such as the lingam-yoni and shaligram respectively. In their literature, the principle of God's true nature as sexless is emphasized as in the Vishnu sahasranama.

Thus, the first few names, of Vishnu sahasranama, in particular, do not describe features of Vishnu in detail and hence are not anthropomorphic.

=== Shakti ===
Shaktism, on the other hand, is a denomination of Hinduism that worships Adi Shakti, or Mahadevi—the Hindu name for the Great Divine Mother—in all of her forms whilst not rejecting the importance of masculine and neuter divinity (which are however deemed to be inactive in the absence of the Shakti). In pure Shaktism, the Great Goddess, or Devi, is worshiped. N. N. Bhattacharyya explained that "[those] who worship the Supreme Deity exclusively as a Female Principle are called Shakta.

Alternative interpretations of Shaktism, however—primarily those of Shaivite scholars, such as Satguru Sivaya Subramuniyaswami—argue that the feminine manifest is ultimately only the vehicle through which the masculine Un-manifest Parasiva is ultimately reached.

=== Divine couples ===
The common separation of shakti (energy) and shaktimana (energetic) principle in god arrives at the conclusion that shakti and shaktimana are the same. Every masculine form of god has their partner, female counterpart (shakti) and without this divine energy he is sometimes viewed as the one without the essential power. In some Bhakti schools, devotees of Hinduism worship both the genders together as the divine couple rather than a specific gender.

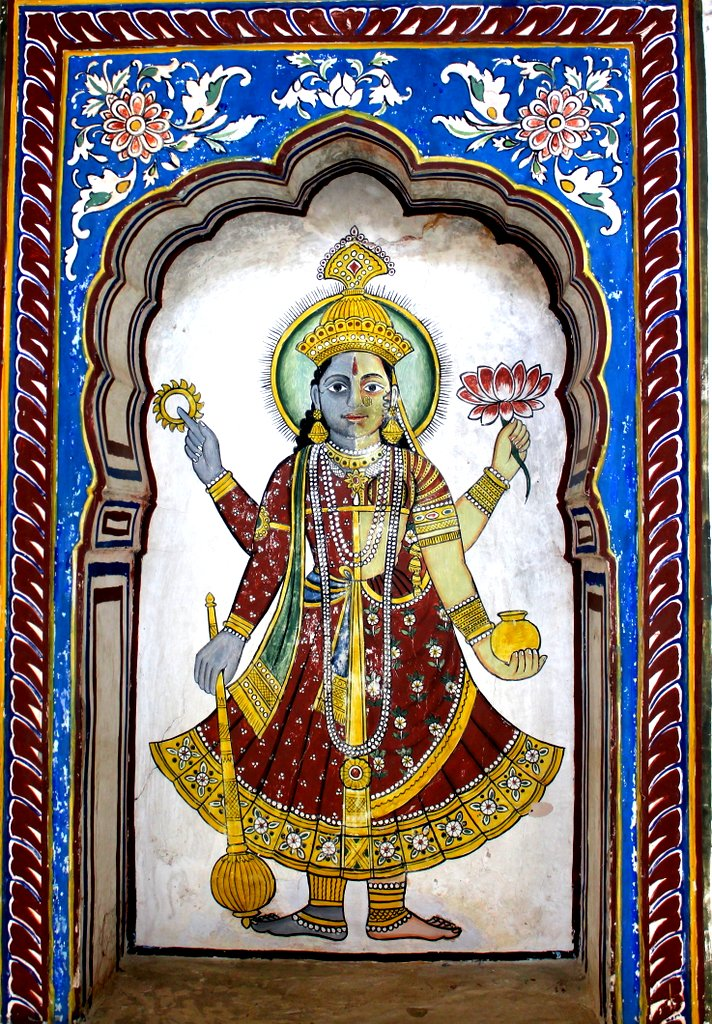
Vaikuntha Kamalaja, a composite form of Lakshmi and Narayana

In the Vaishnava tradition, the divine feminine energy (shakti) implies a divine source of energy of the masculine aspect of God, "Sita relates to Rama; Lakshmi belongs to Narayana; Radha has Her Krishna." The female, in these divine pairs, is viewed as the source of energy and essence of the male form. In the Sri Vaishnava tradition, Lakshmi is described to be the mediatrix of Vishnu's grace, regarded by devotees to intercede on their behalf. Her forgiveness of sins is believed to allow devotees to be in the presence of her consort, highlighting her importance.

In the Shaiva tradition, the supreme goddess Mahadevi is regarded to assume the form of Sati and later Parvati to become the divine energy of Shiva.

One of the prominent features of Vaishnavism in Manipur is the worship of the two genders together. Devotees do not worship Krishna or Radha alone, but they worship Radha-Krishna together. Rasa and other dances are a feature of the regional folk and religious tradition and often the dancer portrays both Krishna and his consort Radha in the same piece.

== See also ==
- God and gender
- Radha Krishna
- Ardhanarishvara
- Sky father
