= Vāstoṣpati =

Hindu god

Vāstoṣpati (Sanskrit: वास्तोष्पतिः "house-lord", an inflected compound of vāstos, the genitive of vāstu "house", and pati "lord") is a Hindu god that presides over the foundation of a house or homestead, mentioned in Mandala 7.55 of the Rigveda. In the Rigveda, Vāstoṣpati is also referred to as pṛdāku-sānu, or 'he whose back is speckled'. As a topic, Vastuvidya, also known as Vāstuśāstra, contains regulations about residential building construction and which sites are chosen for this purpose. The 52nd chapter of the Bṛhat Saṃhitā is entirely devoted to the topic of Vastuvidya, including the house layout, proportions, orientations of different areas of the house, and how construction varies for queens, kings, officials, people, etc.

Vāstu means the site for building and also the house. Hence vāstu pūjā means the worship of the site chosen for building a temple or a house. It is treated as a must for safe and sound construction.
