= Mahamrityunjaya Mantra =

Verse and mantra of the Ṛgveda

The Mahamrityunjaya Mantra (Sanskrit: महामृत्युञ्जयमन्त्र, romanized: mahāmṛtyuñjayamantra, lit. 'great death-conquering mantra'), also known as the Rudra Mantra or Tryambakam Mantra, is a ṛc (verse) of the Ṛgveda (RV 7.59.12) addressed to Tryambaka, 'the three-eyed one', an epithet of Rudra, who is identified with Śiva in Shaivism. It also recurs in the Yajurveda (Taittirīya Saṃhitā 1.8.6.i; Vājasaneyi Mādhyandina 3.60).

== The mantra ==
Recitation of the Mahamrityunjaya Mantra

The mantra, as it appears in the Ṛgveda, reads:

Devanagari

त्र्य॑म्बकं यजामहे सु॒गन्धिं॑ पुष्टि॒वर्ध॑नम् । उ॒र्वा॒रु॒कमि॑व॒ बन्ध॑नान्मृ॒त्योर्मु॑क्षीय॒ मामृता॑त् ॥

IAST

tryàmbakaṃ yajāmahe sugándhiṃ puṣṭivárdhanam.
urvārukámiva bándhanānmṛtyórmukṣīya mā́mṛ́tāt.

Translation by Stephanie W. Jamison and Joel P. Brereton as:

We sacrifice to Tryambaka the fragrant, increaser of prosperity.
Like a cucumber from its stem, might I be freed from death, not from deathlessness.

== Origin ==
In the Ṛgveda, the verse is found in sūkta (hymn) LIX of maṇḍala (book) VII, a composite hymn attributed to Vasiṣṭha Maitrāvaruṇi. The final four verses of the hymn, which include the Mahamrityunjaya Mantra, are late additions to the text. These verses relate to the sākamedha, the final ritual of the cāturmāsya (four-monthly) sacrifices. The sākamedha concludes with an oblation to Rudra Tryambaka, providing the liturgical context for the verse.

== Significance ==
Mahamrityunjaya Mantra is widely revered for its philosophical and spiritual significance. Within Hindu traditions, the mantra is recited for longevity, inner strength, spiritual upliftment, protection from negative energies, and mental, emotional, and physical health. The mantra is said to guide practitioners beyond worldly attachments towards moksha, through the understanding that while the human body is transient, the soul is eternal and that death is a transitory state between the mortal realm and the eternal one. Regular chanting of the mantra is said to bestow enlightenment, mindfulness, mental clarity, and healing.

Mahamrityunjaya Mantra is classified as a mokṣamantra (mantra for liberation), and is chanted during the application of vibhūti (sacred ash), during japa (meditative repetition), or within homa (votive rituals).

== See also ==
- Shri Rudram Chamakam
- Om Namah Shivaya
- Shanti Mantras
- Shiva
- Om
- Vibhuti
- Rudrabhisheka
