= Dadhikra =

Dadhikrā or Dadhikrāvan was likely the racehorse or warhorse selected for the Aśvamedha of King Trasadasyu, who ruled the Rigvedic Pūru tribe. Trasadasyu had led the Pūru eastward across the Indus river and there defeated the Anu-Druhyu and Yadu-Turvaśa tribal unions. The ritual would thus have been meant to strengthen Trasadasyu's royal legitimacy and signal the Pūru's newly preeminent position among the neighboring Aryan tribes.

Dadhikrā has achieved some level of divinity in the Rigveda, and represents the sovereignty of the Pūru and the power of the Aśvamedha as a whole. In the fourth book of the Rigveda he is invoked in three hymns, mostly on his own. Due to his impressive swiftness, Dadhikrā is frequently called a falcon or a hawk. He is extolled as fearsome and physically powerful, and compared to a skillful warrior seeking fame. In two later hymns, Dadhikrā is praised alongside Agni, Ushas and the Asvins, whose solar imagery he shares. Jamison and Brereton remark that "Though it is not entirely clear why Dadhikrā is so strongly associated with the dawn, it may be significant that the priestly gifts are distributed at the dawn ritual and horses are among the most prized of these gifts."

The etymological origin of Dadhikrā's name is not certain but it has been suggested that it is derived from dadhi meaning thickened milk and kri meaning to scatter. This scattering could be attributed to the effect of the morning sun on dew or hoar frost.
