= Thirty-three gods =

Group of deities of Hinduism

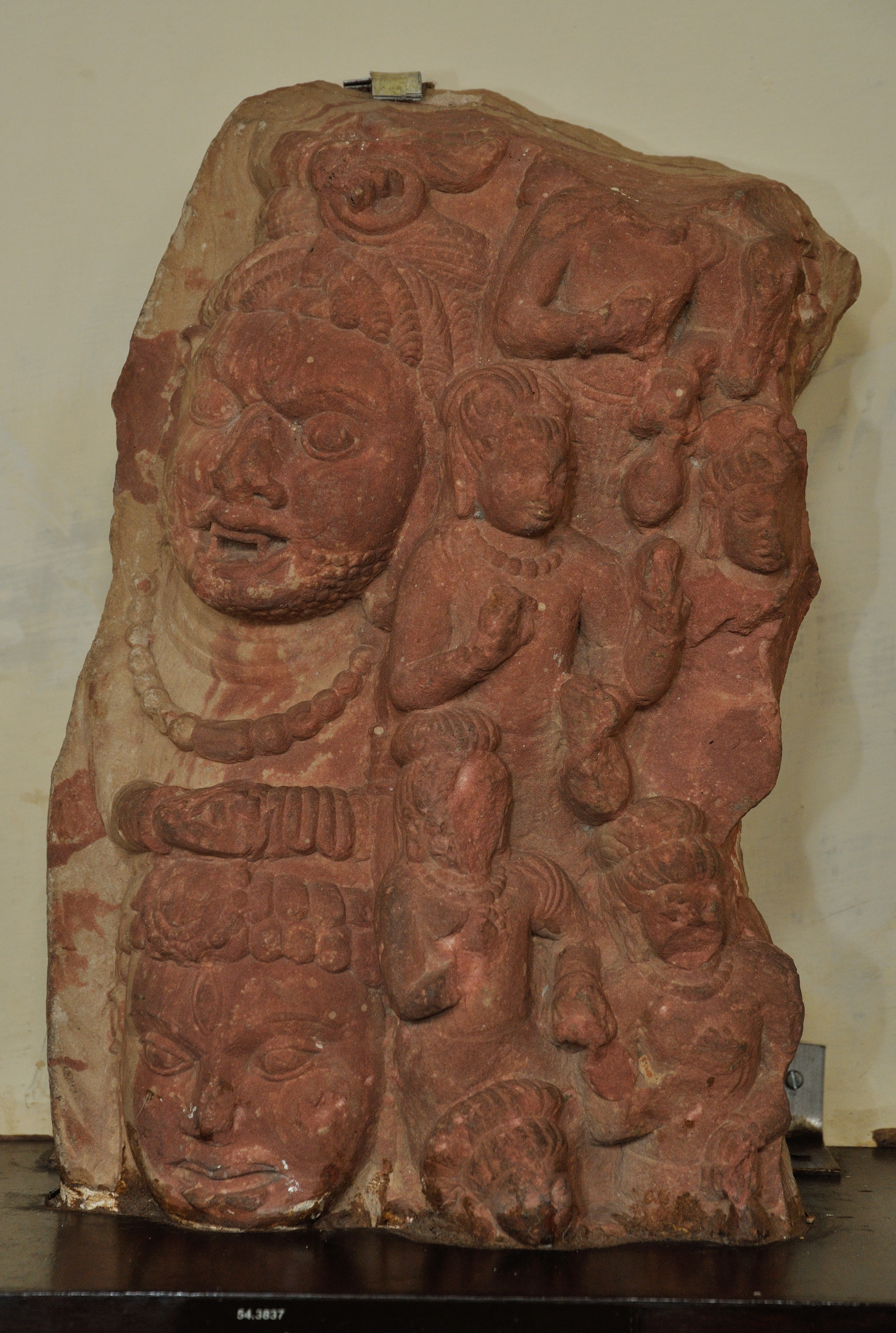
Part of the Vyomamandala showing the Rudras - circa 5th century CE, Katra Keshav Dev; currently at Mathura Museum.

The Thirty-three gods, or Trayastrimshaddevas (Sanskrit: त्रयस्त्रिंशद्देवाः, romanized: Trayastriṃśaddēvāḥ, lit. 'Thirty three deities'), is a pantheon of Rigvedic deities of the current manvantara. The Samhitas, which are the oldest layer of text in the Vedas, enumerate 33 deities classified as Devas, 11 each for the three worlds. They are grouped as 12 Adityas, 11 Rudras, eight Vasus and two Ashvins in the Brahmanas.

== List ==
=== Vedic ===
- Divya (celestial): Vishnu, Aditi, Indra, Garutman, Daksha, Mitra, Varuna, Aryaman, Bhaga, Amsha, and Martanda.
- Pārthiva (terrestrial): Agni, Bhava, Sharva, Pashupati, Ugra, Rudra, Mahadeva, Ishana, Maruts, Ashvins.
- Apya (aquatic): Ganga, Yamuna, Sarasvati, Sindhu (Indus), Soma, Apam Napat, Parjanya, Aja Ekapad, Ahi budhnya, Trita, Ghrita.

=== Brahmana-Itihasa-Puranic ===
- Eight Vasus (deities of material elements) – Dyaus (sky), Prithvi (earth), Nakshatra (stars), Varuna (water), Surya (sun), Chandra (moon)
- Twelve Adityas (personified deities) – Indra (Shakra), Aryaman, Tvashtr, Varuna, Bhaga, Savitr, Vivasvat, Amsha, Mitra, Pushan, Daksha, Vishnu (this list sometimes varies in particulars)
- Eleven Rudras, consisting of Aja, Ekapada, Ahirbudhanya, Tvasta, Rudra, Hara, Sambhu, Trayambaka, Aparajita, Ishana, and Tribhuvana
- Two Ashvins (or Nasatyas), twin solar deities

=== Variations ===
The list of deities varies across the manuscripts found in different parts of South Asia, particularly in terms of the Ashvins and the personified devas. One list based on Book 2 of the Aitereya Brahmana is:

- Devas personified: Indra (Shakra), Varuna, Mitra, Aryaman, Bhaga, Amsha, Vidhata, Tvashtr, Pushan, Vivasvat (Surya), Savitr (Dhatr), Vishnu
- Devas as abstractions or inner principles: Ananda (bliss, inner contentment), Vijnana (knowledge), Manas (mind, thought), Prana (life-force), Vac (speech), Atma (Self), and five manifestations of Rudra – Ishana, Tatpurusha, Aghora, Vamadeva, Sadyojata
- Devas as forces or principles of nature – Prithvi (earth), Agni (fire), Antariksha (atmosphere, space), Jala (water), Vayu (wind), Dyaus (sky), Surya (sun), Nakshatra (stars), Soma (moon)
- Devas as guides or creative energy – Vasatkara, Prajapati

The reported identity of the two Ashvins sometimes varies:

There are eight Vasus, eleven Rudras, twelve Âdityas; and these two, Heaven and Earth, are the (thirty-second and) thirty-third. And there are thirty-three gods, and Pragâpati is the thirty-fourth;--thus he makes him (the sacrificer, or Yagña) to be Pragâpati 2: now that 3 is, for that is immortal, and what is immortal that is. But what is mortal that also is Pragâpati; for Pragâpati is everything: thus he makes him to be Pragâpati, and hence there are these thirty-four utterances, called expiations. (Note: aṣṭau vasavaḥ : ekādaśa rudrā dvādaśādityā ime eva dyāvāpṛthivī trayastriṃśyau trayastriṃśadvai devāḥ prajāpatiścatustriṃśastadenam prajāpatiṃ karotyetadvā astyetaddhyamṛtaṃ yaddhyamṛtaṃ taddhyastyetadu tadyanmartyaṃ sa eṣa prajāpatiḥ sarvaṃ vai prajāpatistadenam prajāpatiṃ karoti tasmādetāścatustriṃśadvyāhṛtayo bhavanti prāyaścittayo nāma.)

— Satapatha Brahmana 4:5:7:2

The Brihadaranyaka Upanishad describes the existence of these deities with a different lineup: It was described by Yajnavalkya at the Bahudakshina Yajna organised by the King Janaka of Mithila at his court.

Yājñavalkya said, 'These are but the manifestations of them, but there are only thirty-three gods.' 'Which are those thirty-three?' 'The eight Vasus, the eleven Rudras and the twelve Ādityas—these are thirty-one, and Indra and Prajāpati make up the thirty-three.'

— Brihadaranyaka Upanishad, Section 9, Verse 3.9.2

== See also ==
- Trāyastriṃśa, the Buddhist equivalent
