= Deva (Hinduism) =

Male celestial being in Hinduism

Translations of Deva
- English: GOD, Heavenly, divine, shiny, exalted, anything of excellence, donor of knowledge or resources.
- Sanskrit: देव (IAST: deva)
- Assamese: দেৱতা (dewatā)
- Balinese: ᬤᬾᬯ (déwa)
- Bengali: দেবতা (debota)
- Hindi: देवता (devatā)
- Javanese: ꦢꦺꦮ (déwa)
- Kannada: ದೇವ (dēva)
- Kashmiri: دیو (dev)
- Malayalam: ദേവൻ (devan)
- Marathi: देव (dev)
- Nepali: देवता (devatā)
- Odia: ଦେବତା (debôta)
- Punjabi: ਦੇਵ (Dēva)
- Tamil: தேவர்கள் (tevarkal̤)
- Telugu: దేవుడు (dēvuḍu)

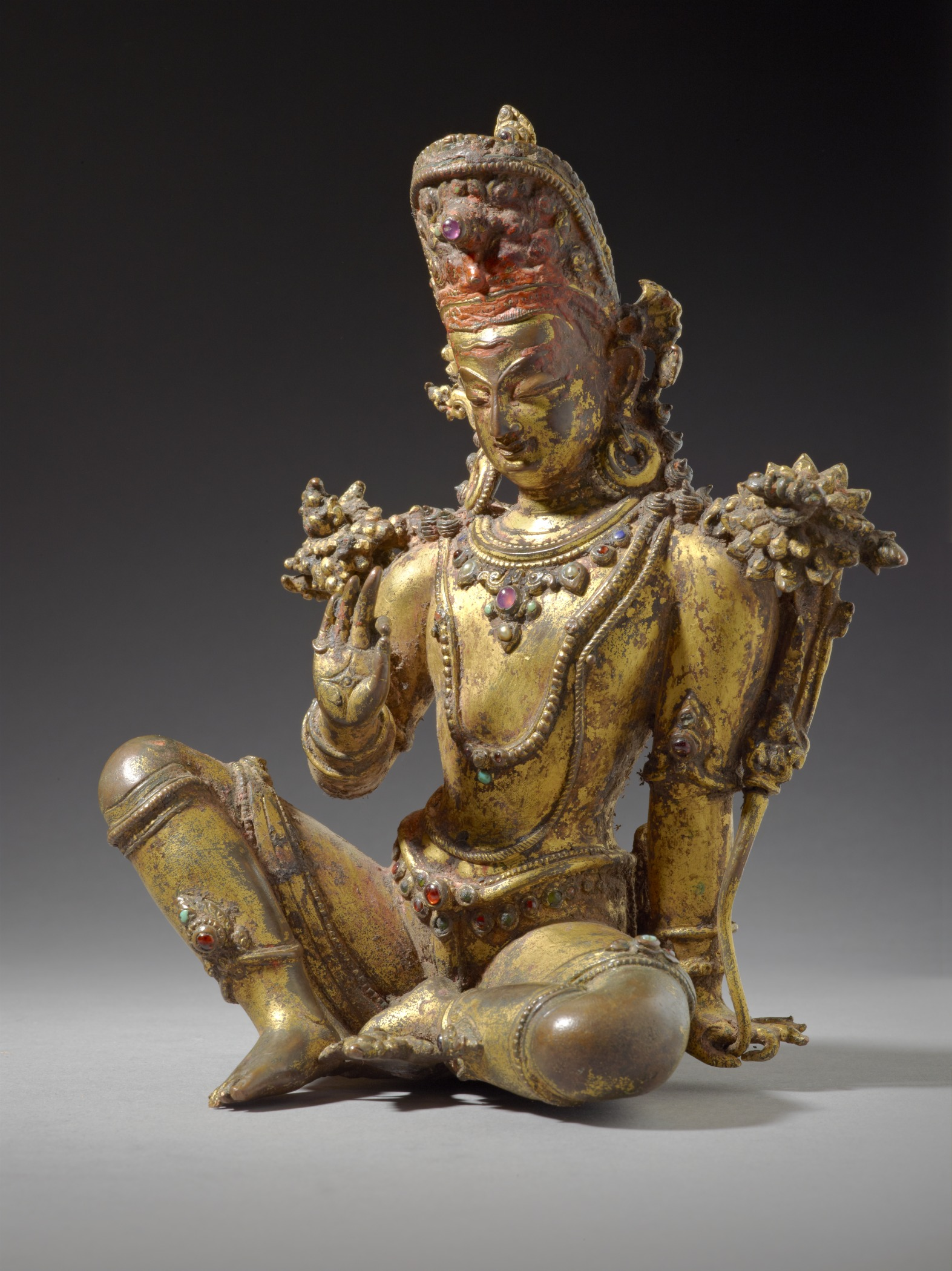
In the earliest Vedic literature, Devas are benevolent supernatural beings; above, a gilt-copper statue of Indra, "Chief of the Gods", from 16th-century Nepal.

Deva (Sanskrit: देव, Sanskrit pronunciation: [de:ʋɐ]) means 'god', 'shiny', 'exalted', 'heavenly being', 'divine being', 'anything of excellence', and is also one of the Sanskrit terms used to indicate a deity in Hinduism. Deva is a masculine term; the feminine equivalent is Devi. The word is a cognate with Latin deus ('god') and Greek Zeus.

In the earliest Vedic literature, all supernatural beings are called Devas and Asuras. The concepts and legends evolved in ancient Indian literature, and by the late Vedic period, benevolent supernatural beings are referred to as Deva-Asuras. In post-Vedic Hindu texts, such as the Puranas and the Itihasas of Hinduism, the Devas represent the good, and the Asuras the bad. In some medieval works of Indian literature, Devas are also referred to as Suras and contrasted with their equally powerful but malevolent half-brothers, referred to as the Asuras.

Devas, along with Asuras, Yakshas (nature spirits), and Rakshasas (ghoulish ogres/demons), are part of Indian mythology, and Devas feature in many cosmological theories in Hinduism.

== Etymology ==
Deva is a Sanskrit word found in Vedic literature of the 2nd millennium BCE. Sir Monier Monier-Williams translates it as "GOD,heavenly, divine, terrestrial things of high excellence, exalted, shining ones". The concept also is used to refer to deity.

The Sanskrit deva- is hypothesized to be derived from Indo-Iranian *daiv- which in turn theoretically descends from the Proto-Indo-European word, *deiwo-, which supposedly was an adjective meaning "celestial" or "shining", which is a (not synchronic Sanskrit) vrddhi derivative from *diw, zero-grade of the root *dyew- meaning "to shine", especially as the day-lit sky. The feminine form of *deiwos is *deiwih_{2}, which descends into Indic languages as devi, in that context meaning "female deity". Also hypothetically deriving from *deiwos, and thus cognates of deva, are "Zeys/Ζεύς" - "Dias/Δίας", the Greek father of the gods, Lithuanian Dievas (Latvian Dievs, Old-Prussian Deiwas), Germanic Tiwaz (seen in English "Tuesday") and the related Old Norse Tivar (gods), and Latin Deus "god" and divus "divine", from which the English words "divine" and "deity" are derived. It is related to *Dyeus which while from the same root, may originally have referred to the "heavenly shining father", and hence to "Father Sky", the chief God of the Indo-European pantheon, continued in Sanskrit Dyaus. The abode of the Devas is Dyuloka.

According to Douglas Harper, the etymological roots of Deva mean "a shining one," from *div- "to shine," and it is cognate with Greek dios "divine" and Zeus, and Latin deus "god" (Old Latin deivos). The word "Deva" shares similarities with Persian Daeva.

Deva is masculine; the related feminine equivalent is devi. Etymologically, Devi is cognate with Latin dea. When capitalized, Devi or Mata refers to a divine mother goddess in Hinduism. Deva is also referred to as Devatā, and Devi as Devika.

The word Deva is also a proper name or part of a name in Indian culture, where it refers to "one who wishes to excel, overcome" or the "seeker of, master of or a best among".

Another interpretation of the word is derived from the word "dibbati", which means to play or to sport. This denotes their playful nature and that they enjoy themselves with the five sensual pleasures.

== Vedic literature ==
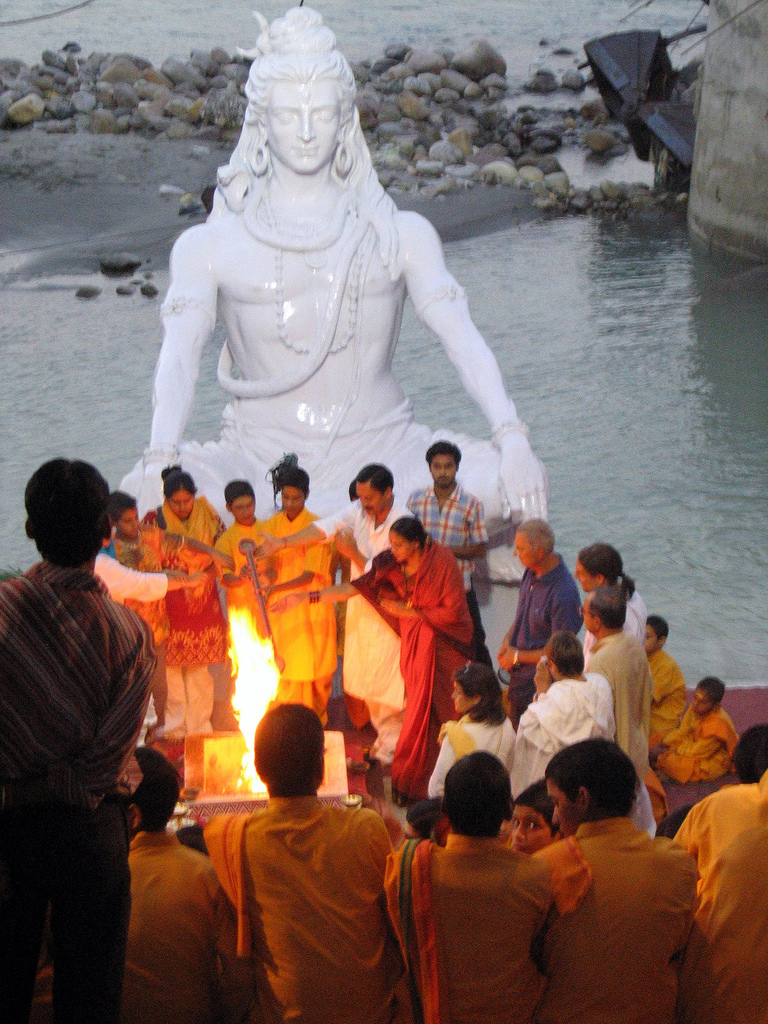
Shiva/Rudra has been a major Deva in Hinduism since the Vedic times. Above is a meditating statue of him in the Himalayas with Hindus offering prayers.

=== Samhitas and Brahmanas ===
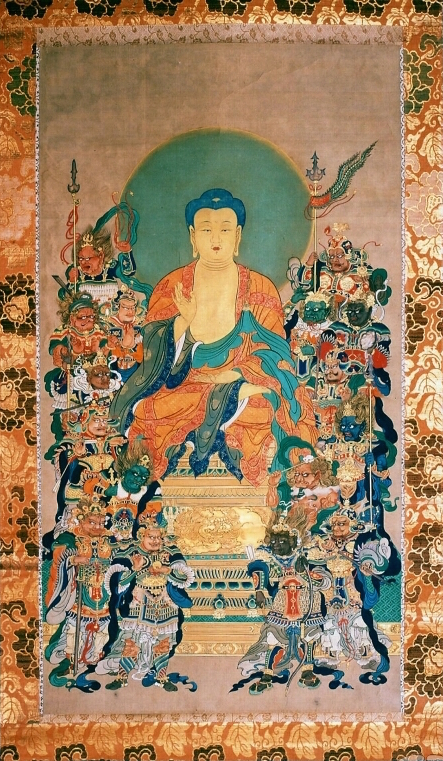
The 12 Devas protecting Buddha, by Tani Bunchō. The Hindu Devas were adopted by Japanese Buddhists in the first millennium as Jūni-ten

The Samhitas, which are the oldest layer of text in Vedas, enumerate 33 devas, (Note: The list of Vedic Devas somewhat varies across the manuscripts found in different parts of South Asia, particularly in terms of guides (Aswins) and personified Devas. One list based on Book 2 of Aitereya Brahmana is: Devas personified: Indra (Śakra), Varuṇa, Mitra, Aryaman, Bhaga, Aṃśa, Vidhatr (Brahma), Tvāṣṭṛ, Pūṣan, Vivasvat, Savitṛ (Dhatr), Vishnu.; Devas as abstractions or inner principles: Ānanda (bliss, inner contentment), Vijñāna (knowledge), Manas (mind, thought), Prāṇa (life-force), Vāc (speech), Ātmā (soul, self within each person), and five manifestations of Rudra/Shiva – Īśāna, Tatpuruṣa, Aghora, Vāmadeva, Sadyojāta; Devas as forces or principles of nature – Pṛthivī (earth), Agni (fire), Antarikṣa (atmosphere, space), Jal (water), Vāyu (wind), Dyauṣ (aether or sky), Sūrya (sun), Nakṣatra (stars), Soma (moon); Devas as guide or creative energy – Vasatkara, Prajāpati) either 11 each for the three worlds, or as 12 Adityas, 11 Rudras, 8 Vasus and 2 Asvins in the Brahmanas layer of Vedic texts. The Rigveda states in hymn 1.139.11,

ये देवासो दिव्येकादश स्थ पृथिव्यामध्येकादश स्थ ।
अप्सुक्षितो महिनैकादश स्थ ते देवासो यज्ञमिमं जुषध्वम् ॥११॥

O ye eleven deities whose home is heaven, O ye eleven who make earth your dwelling,
Ye who with might, eleven, live in waters, accept this sacrifice, O deities, with pleasure.
– Translated by Ralph T. H. Griffith

Deities who are eleven in heaven; who are eleven on earth;
and who are eleven dwelling with glory in mid-air; may ye be pleased with this our sacrifice.
– Translated by HH Wilson

— Rigveda 1.139.11

Some devas represent the forces of nature and some represent moral values (such as the Adityas, Varuna, and Mitra), each symbolizing the epitome of a specialized knowledge, creative energy, exalted and magical powers (Siddhis). The most referred to Devas in the Rig Veda are Indra, Agni (fire) and Soma, with "fire deity" called the friend of all humanity, it and Soma being the two celebrated in a yajna fire ritual that marks major Hindu ceremonies. Savitr, Vishnu, Rudra, and Prajapati (later Brahma) are gods and hence Devas. Parvati (power and love) and Durga (victory) are some Devis or goddesses. Many of the deities taken together are invoked as the Vishvedevas.

=== Important Devas ===
- Brahma the deity of creation
- Vishnu the deity of preservation
- Shiva the deity of destruction and time; associated with fertility and regeneration
- Ganesha the deity of new beginnings, wisdom, and luck
- Hanuman the deity associated to courage, reverence and strength/avatar of Shiva
- Kartikeya the deity of victory and war
- Dhanvantari the deity of doctors and Ayurveda/avatar of Vishnu
- Vishwakarma the deity of architecture
- Dyaus the deity of the aether (or sky)
- Vayu the deity of air, wind and breath
- Varuna the deity of water and rain
- Agni the deity of fire
- Yama the deity of death and justice
- Samudra the deity of the seas/form of Varuna
- Kubera the deity of opulence and wealth
- Kamadeva the deity of love
- Indra the deity of weather, storms and sky
- Ashwini Kumara the deity of health and medicine
- Surya the deity of the sun, light and day
- Chandra the deity of the moon and night
- Mangala the deity of Mars and Aggression
- Budha the deity of Mercury and Nature
- Brihaspati the deity of Jupiter and teacher of the Devas
- Shukra the deity of Venus and worship (bhakti) and teacher of the Asuras
- Shani the deity of Saturn and deeds (karma)

=== Henotheism ===
In Vedic literature, Deva is not a monotheistic God; rather a "supernatural, divine" concept manifesting in various ideas and knowledge, in a form that combines excellence in some aspects, wrestling with weakness and questions in other aspects, heroic in their outlook and actions, yet tied up with emotions and desires.

Max Muller states that the Vedic hymns are remarkable in calling every one of the different devas as "the only one, the supreme, the greatest". Muller concluded that the Vedic ideas about devas are best understood neither as polytheism nor as monotheism, but as henotheism where gods are equivalent, different perspectives, different aspects of reverence and spirituality, unified by principles of Ṛta and Dharma.

=== Characteristics of Devas in the Vedic literature ===
Ananda Coomaraswamy states that Devas and Asuras in the Vedic lore are similar to the Olympian gods and Titans of Greek mythology. Both are powerful but have different orientations and inclinations, with the Devas representing the powers of Light and the Asuras representing the powers of Darkness in Hindu texts According to Coomaraswamy's interpretation of Devas and Asuras, both these natures exist in each human being, both the tyrant and the angel. The best and the worst within each person struggles before choices and one's own nature, and the Hindu formulation of Devas and Asuras is an eternal dance between these within each person.

The Devas and Asuras, Angels and Titans, powers of Light and powers of Darkness in Rigveda, although distinct and opposite in operation, are in essence consubstantial, their distinction being a matter not of essence but of orientation, revolution or transformation. In this case, the Titan is potentially an Angel, the Angel still by nature a Titan; the Darkness in actu is Light, the Light in potentia Darkness; whence the designations Asura and Deva may be applied to one and the same Person according to the mode of operation, as in Rigveda 1.163.3, "Trita art thou (Agni) by interior operation".

— Ananda Coomaraswamy, Journal of the American Oriental Society

All-powerful beings, good or evil, are called Devas and Asuras in the oldest layer of Vedic texts. A much-studied hymn of the Rigveda states Devav asura (Asuras who have become Devas), and contrasts it with Asura adevah (Asuras who are not Devas). They are born from the same father, Prajapati, the primordial progenitor; his sons are envisioned as the Asuras and Devas. They all share the same residence (Loka), eat together the same food and drinks (Soma), and have innate potential, knowledge and special powers in Hindu mythology; the only thing that distinguishes "Asuras who become Devas" from "Asuras who remain Asuras" is intent, action and choices they make in their mythic lives.

== Upanishads ==
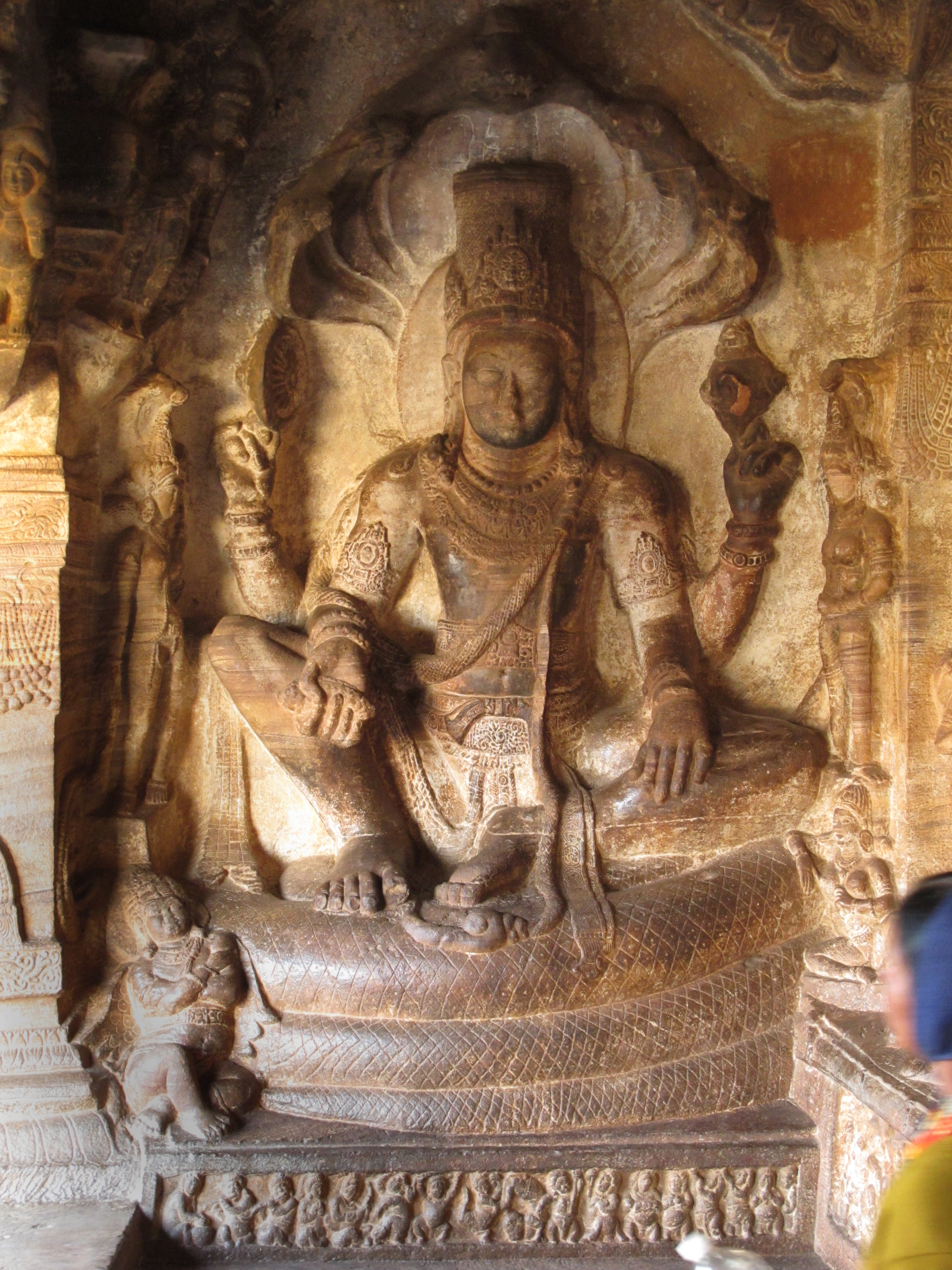
Vishnu (above) is one of the Vedic Devas. The third Valli of the Katha Upanishad discusses ethical duties of man through the parable of the chariot as a means to realize the state of Vishnu, one with Self-knowledge.

The oldest Upanishads mention Devas, and their struggle with the Asuras. The Kaushitaki Upanishad, for example, in Book 4 states that "Indra was weaker than the Asuras when he did not know his own Atman (soul, self). Once Indra had self-knowledge, he became independent, sovereign and victorious over the Asuras"; similarly, states Kaushitaki Upanishad, "the man who knows his inner self gains independence, sovereignty and is unaffected by all evil".

Chandogya Upanishad, in chapter 1.2, describes the battle between Devas and Asuras on various sensory powers. This battle between good and evil fails to produce a victor and simply manifests itself in the perceived universe, as good or evil sights witnessed by beings, as good or evil words shared between people, as good or evil smells of nature, as good or evil feelings experienced, as good or evil thoughts within each person. Finally, the Deva-Asura battle targets the soul, where Asuras fail and Devas succeed, because soul-force is serene and inherently good, asserts Chandogya Upanishad.

Mantra 5.2.1 of the Brihadaranyaka Upanishad describes Devas, Men, and Asuras as sons of Prajapati, the primordial father. Each asks for a lesson on ethics. Prajapati tells the Devas to observe the virtue of temperance (self-restraint, Dama), the Men to observe the virtue of charity (Dana), and Asuras to observe the virtue of compassion (Daya). At the end of the Brāhmanam, the Upanishad declares that these are three cardinal virtues that should always be observed by all Devas, Men and Asuras.

Medieval era Indian scholars, in their Bhasya (review and commentaries) on the Upanishads, stated that the discussion of Devas and Asuras in the Upanishads is symbolic, and it represents the good and evil that resides and struggles within each human being. Adi Shankara, for example, in his commentary on Brihadaranyaka Upanishad asserted that Devas represent the human seeking for the sacred and spiritual, while the Asuras represent the human seeking for the worldly excesses. Edelmann and other modern era scholars also state that the Devas versus Asuras discussion in Upanishads is a form of symbolism.

In the later primary Upanishadic texts, Devas and Asuras discuss and act to seek knowledge, for different purposes. In one case, for example, they go to Prajāpati, their father, to understand what is Self (Atman, soul) and how to realize it. The first answer that Prajāpati gives is simplistic, which the Asuras accept and leave with, but the Devas led by Indra do not accept and question because Indra finds that he hasn't grasped its full significance and the given answer has inconsistencies. Edelmann states that this symbolism embedded in the Upanishads is a reminder that one must struggle with presented ideas, learning is a process, and Deva nature emerges with effort.

== Puranas and Itihasas ==
In the Puranas and the Itihasas with the embedded Bhagavad Gita, the Devas represent the good, and the Asuras the bad. According to the Bhagavad Gita (16.6-16.7), all beings in the universe have both the divine qualities (daivi sampad) and the demonic qualities (asuri sampad) within each. The sixteenth chapter of the Bhagavad Gita states that pure god-like saints are rare and pure demon-like evil are rare among human beings, and the bulk of humanity is multi-charactered with a few or many faults. According to Jeaneane Fowler, the Gita states that desires, aversions, greed, needs, emotions in various forms "are facets of ordinary lives", and it is only when they turn to lust, hate, cravings, arrogance, conceit, anger, harshness, hypocrisy, violence, cruelty and such negativity- and destruction-inclined that natural human inclinations metamorphose into something demonic (Asura).

Everyone starts as an Asura in Hindu mythology, born of the same father. "Asuras who remain Asura" share the character of powerful beings obsessed with their craving for more power, more wealth, ego, anger, unprincipled nature, force and violence. The "Asuras who become Devas" in contrast are driven by an inner voice, seek understanding and meaning, prefer moderation, principled behavior, morals, knowledge, and harmony. The hostility between the two is the source of extensive legends and tales in the Puranic and the Epic literature of Hinduism; however, many texts discuss their hostility in neutral terms and without explicit condemnation. Some of these tales are the basis for myths behind major Hindu festivals, such as the story of Asura Ravana and Deva Rama in the Ramayana and the legend of Asura Hiranyakashipu and Deva Vishnu as Narasimha, the latter celebrated with the Hindu spring festival of Holika and Holi.

=== Bhagavata Purana ===
In Bhagavata Purana, Brahma had ten sons: Marichi, Atri, Angira, Pulastya, Pulaha, Kratu, Vasistha, Daksa, Narada. Marichi had a son called Kasyapa. Kasyapa had thirteen wives: Aditi, Diti, Danu, Kadru etc. The sons of Aditi are called Adityas, the sons of Diti are called Daityas, and the sons of Danu are called Danavas. Bṛhaspati (Jupiter, son of Angiras) is a guru of devas (vedic gods). Shukracharya (Venus, son of Bhrigu) is a guru of asuras (vedic demons) or/and Danavas.

=== Symbolism ===
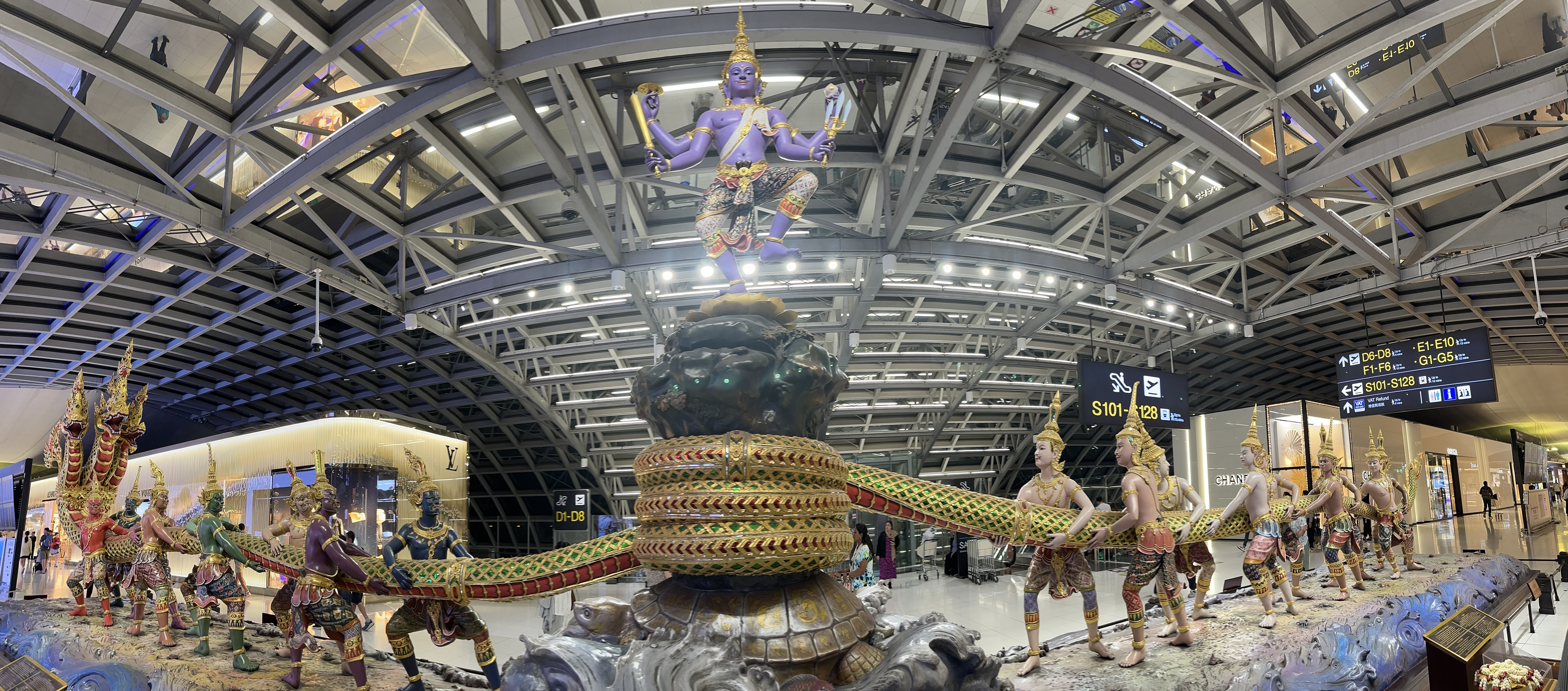
The Devas (god) and Asuras (anti-god) churning the ocean of milk, Samudra Manthan sculpture at the Suvarnabhumi Airport in Bangkok, Thailand.

Edelmann states that the dichotomies present in the Puranas literature of Hinduism are symbolism for spiritual concepts. For example, god Indra (a Deva) and the antigod Virocana (an Asura) question a sage for insights into the knowledge of the self. Virocana leaves with the first given answer, believing now he can use the knowledge as a weapon. In contrast, Indra keeps pressing the sage, churning the ideas, and learning about means to inner happiness and power. Edelmann suggests that the Deva-Asura dichotomies in Hindu mythology may be seen as "narrative depictions of tendencies within our selves".

The god (Deva) and antigod (Asura), states Edelmann, are also symbolically the contradictory forces that motivate each individual and people, and thus Deva-Asura dichotomy is a spiritual concept rather than mere genealogical category or species of being. In the Bhāgavata Purana, saints and gods are born in families of Asuras, such as Mahabali and Prahlada, conveying the symbolism that motivations, beliefs, and actions rather than one's birth and family circumstances define whether one is Deva-like or Asura-like.

== Classical Hinduism ==
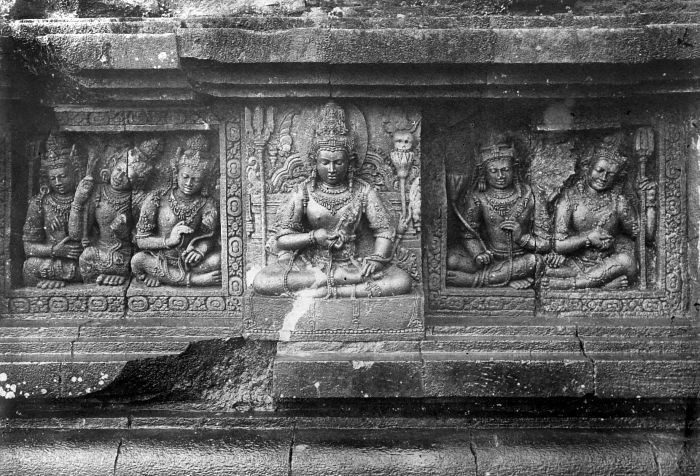
The male Lokapala devas, the guardians of the directions, on the wall of Shiva temple, Prambanan (Java, Indonesia).

In Hinduism, Devas are celestial beings associated with various aspects of the cosmos. The principal Devas are said to control the forces of nature, such as Indra, the King of the devas and Lord of thunder, Vayu, the Lord of the wind, Varuna the Lord of water, and Agni, the Lord of fire.

Most verses in the Vedas are dedicated to other Devas, while the Trimurti deities Brahma, Vishnu, and Shiva find very few mentions in them. However, during and after the time of the Puranas, the Trimurti deities are greatly elevated above the level of the other Devas.

Interestingly, the deity Varuna was considered to be an Asura in the Rigveda, while in later Vedas he was given the rank of Deva instead.

Hinduism also has many other lesser celestial beings, such as the Gandharvas (male celestial musicians) and Apsaras (female celestial dancers)

== Sangam literature ==
Tamil Sangam literature (300BC-300CE) contains numerous references to ritual offerings made to devas as part of public and domestic religious life. In the Silappatikaram, one of the Five Great Epics of Tamil literature, attributed to Ilango Adigal, offerings are described for the four classes of devas (Nālvakai Tēvar). These include flowers, incense, cooked food, and other ritual items presented during temple festivals and ceremonial worship, illustrating the established role of devotional offerings (pūjā) in early Tamil religious practice. The text also portrays cities adorned for festivals, with shrines dedicated to different deities receiving offerings from worshippers and royal patronage.

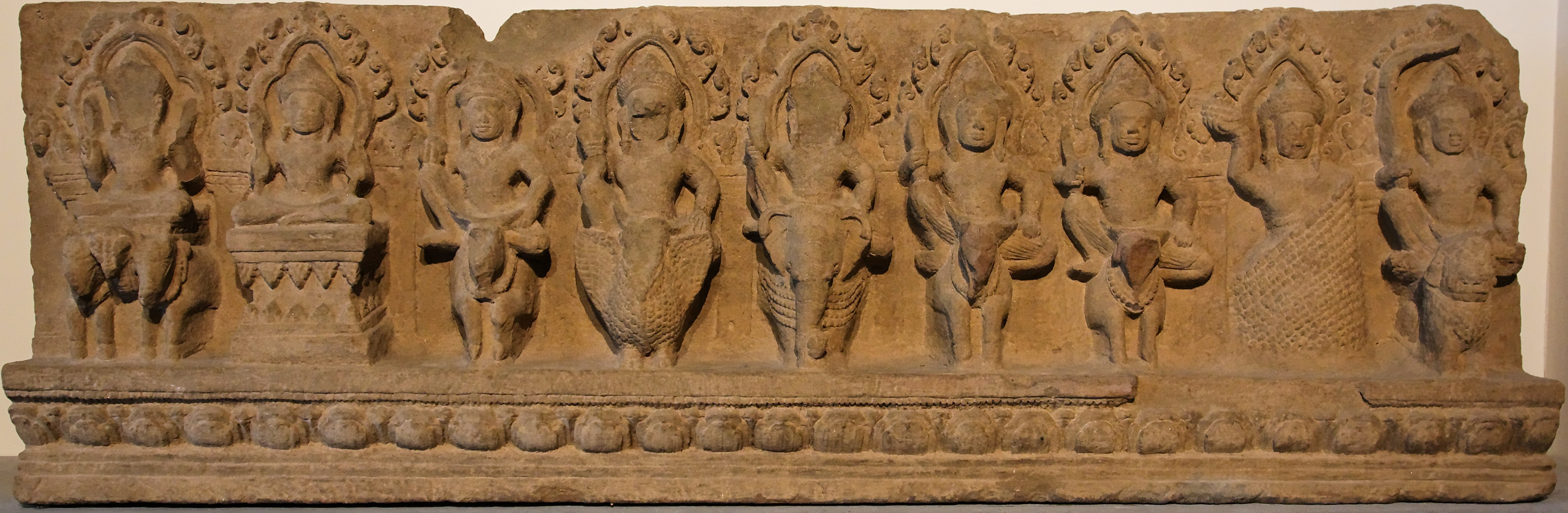
The nine Devas, Khleangs artwork from Cambodia (~1000 CE). From left to right: Surya (Sun) on chariot, Chandra (Moon) on pedestal, Shiva on bull, Varuna on crocodile, Indra on elephant, Kubera on horse, Agni on ram, Rahu on clouds and Ketu on lion.

== See also ==
- Bhagavan
- Daeva
- Deva (Buddhism)
- Deva (Theosophy)
- Devata
- Divinity
- Diwata
- God and gender in Hinduism
- Hindu deities
- Ishvara
- Jangam
- Vishvadevas
