= Pushan =

Hindu god

- God of meetings, marriages, journeys, roads, cattle
- Devanagari: पूषन्
- Affiliation: Deva, Adityas
- Planet: Sun
- Weapon: Golden axe, awl, goad
- Mount: Chariot driven by goats
- Parents: Aditi and Kashyapa
- Consort: Sūryā

Equivalents
- Greek: Pan or Hermes
- Roman: Faunus or Mercury

Pushan (Sanskrit: पूषन् , IAST: Pūṣan) is a Hindu Vedic solar deity and one of the Adityas. He is the god of meeting. Pushan is responsible for marriages, journeys, roads, and the feeding of cattle. He is a psychopomp (soul guide), conducting souls to the other world. He protects travelers from bandits and wild beasts, and protects men from being exploited by other men. He is a supportive guide, a "good" god, leading his adherents towards rich pastures and wealth.

== Etymology ==
Traditionally, the name of the deity is said to be derived from Sanskrit verb, pūṣyati, which means "to cause to thrive". Many modern scholars consider Pushan to be derived from the reconstructed Proto-Indo-European god *Péh₂usōn, which would thereby make Pushan a cognate of the Greek god Pan. The connection between Pan and Pushan was first proposed by the German scholar Hermann Collitz in 1924.

== Texts ==
Ten hymns in the Rigveda are dedicated to Pūṣan (including one jointly to Soma and Pūṣan and another to Indra and Pūṣan). His chariot is pulled by goats. Sometimes he is described as driving the Sun in its course across the sky. He seems to represent the sun as a guardian of flocks and herds. Pushan is also regarded as Kavi, who in turn became an epithet of a number of gods and further a title signifying "king".

He has braided hair and a beard, and carries a golden axe, an awl, and a goad. He eats gruel, and in the Shatapatha Brahmana is stated to be toothless. He is married to Sūryā, the daughter of the Sun, whom the gods bestowed on him. He is a knower of paths and a guardian of roads. In this role he protects people from various dangers on roads, such as wolves and ambushers. He is also associated with divine paths, and is familiar with the path between earth and heaven, which allows him lead souls to heaven. He is invoked to guard cattle, horses, and sheep, and is asked to find those cattle that have been lost.

According to a narrative found in the Taittiriya Samhita, Rudra was excluded from the Daksha yajna, an important sacrifice in honor of various deities. He, in anger, pierced the sacrifice with an arrow and broke Pushan's teeth as he attempted to eat a part of the oblation. The later versions of this narrative are found in the Ramayana, Mahabharata, and the Puranas. In these versions, Rudra (or Shiva) was angry because his father-in-law, Daksha, the sacrificer, did not invite him. Shiva, in anger, kicked Pushan and knocked out his teeth as he was eating the oblation. In the Puranic versions, Virabhadra, created by Shiva from a lock of his matted hair, knocked out Pushan's teeth.

In the Mahabharata and Puranas, Pushan is described as one of the twelve Adityas (Aditi's sons). Aditi's other eleven sons as listed in the Mahabharata are Surya, Aryaman, Tvashta, Savitr, Bhaga, Dhata, Mitra, Varuna, Amsha, Indra and Vishnu (in the form of Vamanadeva).

== See also ==
- Hindu deities
- Hindu mythology
- List of Hindu deities
