= Vayu =

Hindu god of the wind

Vāyu
- God of Air, Wind, and Breath
- Member of the Pancha Bhuta and Dikpala
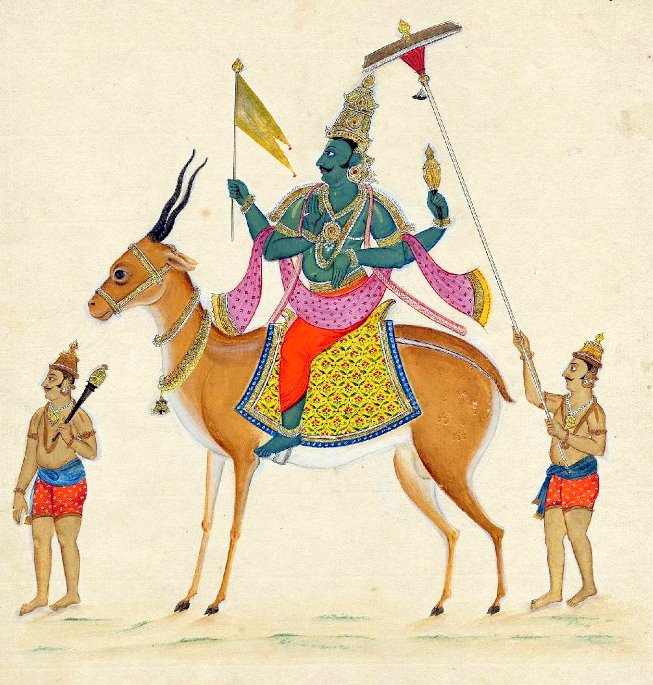
- Vayu on his Vahana.
- Other names: Anila (अनिल); Pávana (पवन); Vyāna (व्यान); Vāta (वात); Tanūna (तनून); Mukhyaprāṇa (मुख्यप्राण); Bhīma (भीम); Maruta (मारुत)
- Devanagari: वायु
- Sanskrit transliteration: Vāyu
- Affiliation: Deva
- Abode: Vayu Loka, Satya Loka
- Mantra: Om Vayave Namaha
- Weapon: Mace (weapon of Mukhyaprana Vayu); Goad (weapon of Dikpala Vayu); Vayavyastra (Vayu's astra)
- Mount: Chariot drawn by Horses, Gazelle

Genealogy
- Parents: Vishvapurusha (according to the Rigveda); Vishnu and Lakshmi (according to Madhva sect)
- Consort: A daughter of Tvashta (according to the Rigveda); Svasti (according to the Devi Bhagavata Purana); Bharati (according to Madhva sect)
- Children: Mudā Apsaras (daughters); Hanuman (son); Bhima (son)

Equivalents
- Indo-European: H₂weh₁yú

Vayu (Sanskrit: वायु, romanised: Vāyu, lit. 'Wind/Air'; Sanskrit pronunciation: [ʋaːju]), also known as Vata (Sanskrit: वात, romanised: Vāta, lit. 'Wind/Air') and Pavana (Sanskrit: पवन, romanised: Pávana, lit. 'Purifier'), is the Hindu god of the winds as well as the divine messenger of the gods. In the Vedic scriptures, Vayu is an important deity and is closely associated with Indra, the king of gods. He is mentioned to be born from the breath of Supreme Being Vishvapurusha and also the first one to drink Soma. The Upanishads praise him as Prana or 'life breath of the world'. In the later Hindu scriptures, he is described as a dikpala (one of the guardians of the direction), who looks over the north-west direction. The Hindu epics describe him as the father of the god Hanuman and Bhima.

The followers of the 13th-century saint Madhva regard him as an incarnation of Vāyu. This identification is part of Madhva sectarian tradition; however, the textual basis cited for some such claims has been questioned in modern scholarship, especially by Roque Mesquita, who argued that a number of sources attributed to Madhva are of uncertain or problematic status.

== Connotations ==
The word for air (vāyu) or wind (pavana) is one of the classical elements in Hinduism. The Sanskrit word Vāta literally means 'blown'; Vāyu, 'blower' and Prāna, 'breathing' (viz. the breath of life, cf. the *an- in animate). Hence, the primary referent of the word is the 'deity of life', who is sometimes for clarity referred to as Mukhya-Vāyu (the chief Vayu) or Mukhya Prāna (the chief of life force or vital force).

Sometimes the word vāyu, which is more generally used in the sense of the physical air or wind, is used as a synonym for prāna. Vāta, an additional name for the deity Vayu, is the root of vātāvaranam, the Sanskrit and Hindi term for 'atmosphere'.

== Hindu texts and philosophy ==
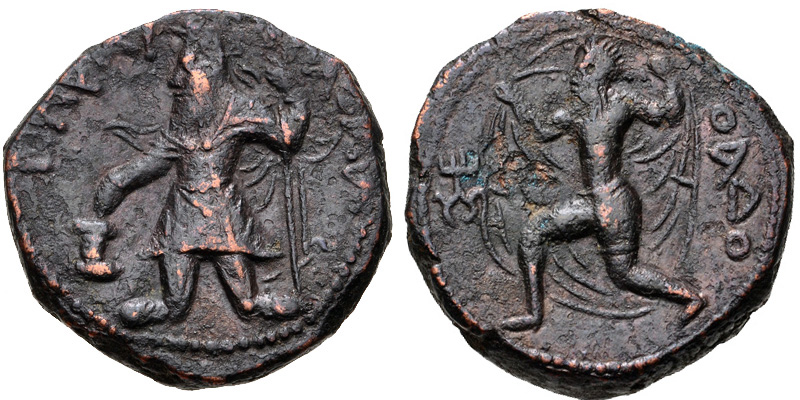
Kushan ruler Kanishka I with deity Oado (Vayu-Vata) on the reverse. Circa 120-150 CE

In the Rigveda, Vayu is associated with the winds, with the Maruts being described as being born from Vayu's belly. Vayu is also the first god to receive soma in the ritual, and then he and Indra share their first drink. In the hymns, Vayu is 'described as having "exceptional beauty" and moving noisily in his shining coach, driven by two or forty-nine or one-thousand white and purple horses. A white banner is his main attribute'. Like the other atmospheric deities, he is a 'fighter and destroyer', 'powerful and heroic'.

In the Upanishads, there are numerous statements and illustrations of the greatness of Vayu. The Brihadaranyaka Upanishad says that the gods who control bodily functions once engaged in a contest to determine who among them is the greatest. When a deity such as that of vision would leave a man's body, that man would continue to live, albeit as a blind man and having regained the lost faculty once the errant deity returned to his post. One by one the deities all took their turns leaving the body, but the man continued to live on, though successively impaired in various ways. Finally, when Mukhya Prāna started to leave the body, all the other deities started to be inexorably pulled off their posts by force, 'just as a powerful horse yanks off pegs in the ground to which he is bound'. This caused the other deities to realise that they can function only when empowered by Vayu, and can be overpowered by him easily. In another episode, Vayu is said to be the only deity not afflicted by demons of sin who were on the attack. This Vayu is "Mukhya Prana Vayu". The Chandogya Upanishad says that one cannot know Brahman except by knowing Vayu as the udgitha (the mantric syllable om).

Vayu is also one of the Vasus, a group of eight deities mentioned in Ramayana, Mahabharata and Vedas. Within this categorisation, Vayu is also known as Anila.

== Avatars ==
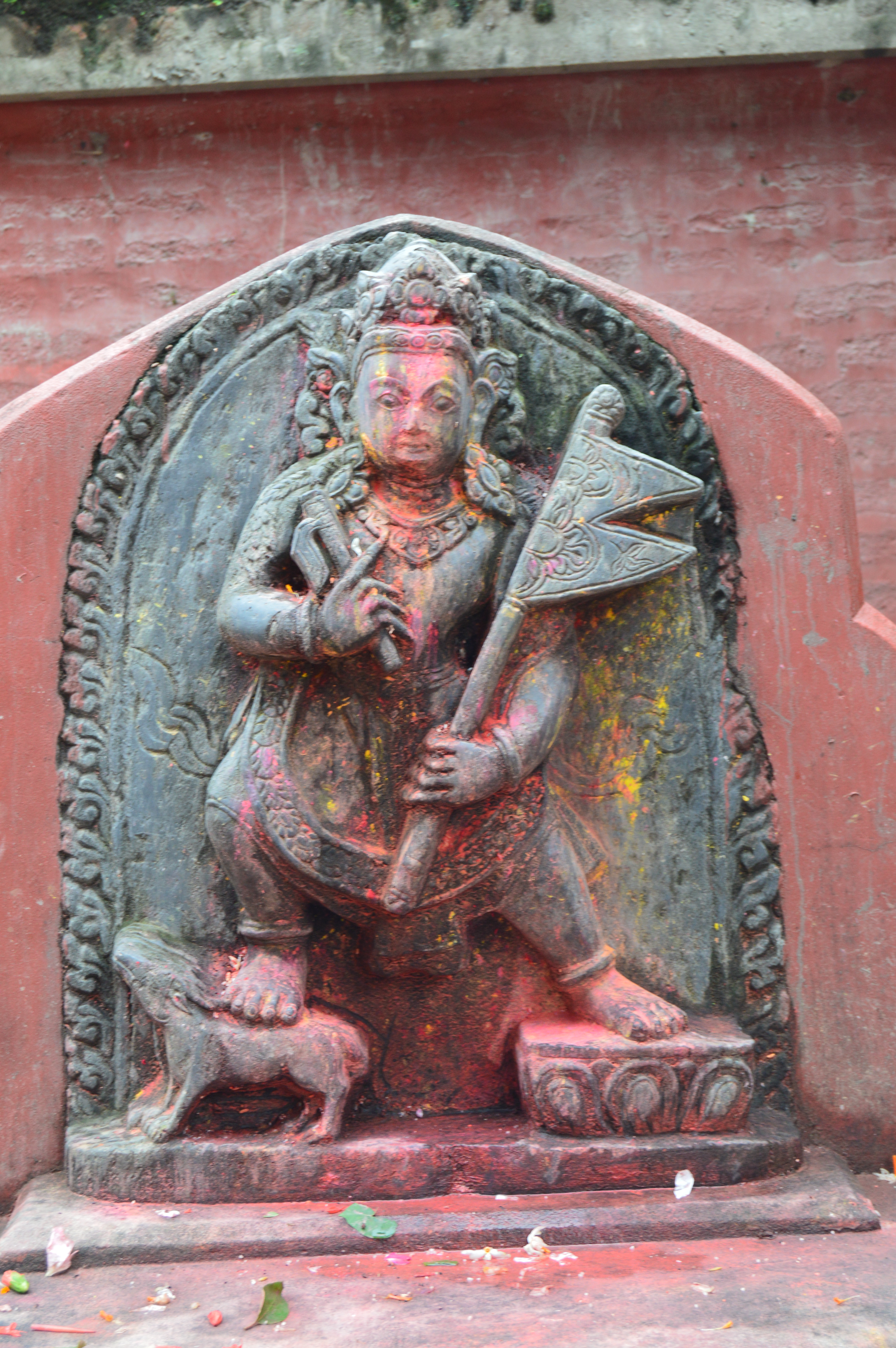
Vayu sculpture, Gokarneshwor Mahadev Temple, Gokarna, Kathmandu

American Indologist Philip Lutgendorf says, "According to Madhva whenever Vishnu incarnates on earth, Mukhya Prana/Vayu accompanies him and aids his work of preserving dharma. Hanuman the friend and helper of Rama in the Treta Yuga, the strongman Bhima in Mahabharata, set at the end of Dvapara Yuga and Madhva in the Kali Yuga. Moreover, since the deity himself does not appear on earth until the end of Kali Yuga, the incarnate Vayu/Madhva serves during this period as the sole 'means' to bring souls to salvation". Vayu is also known as Pavana and Matharishwa.

In the Mahabharata, Bhima was the spiritual son of Vayu and played a major role in the Kurukshetra War. He utilised his huge power and skill with the mace for supporting Dharma.

- The first avatar of Vayu is considered to be Hanuman. His stories are told in Ramayana. Since Hanuman is the spiritual son of Vayu he is also called Pavanaputra 'son of Pavana' and Vāyuputra. Today, Pavan is a fairly common Hindu name.
- The second avatar of Vayu is Bhima, one of the Pandavas appearing in the epic the Mahabharata.
- Madhvacharya, is considered as the third avatar of Vayu. Madhva declared himself as an avatar of Vayu and showed the verses in Rigveda as a proof. Author C. Ramakrishna Rao says, "Madhva explained the Balitha Sukta in the Rigveda as referring to the three forms of Vayu".

== Buddhism ==
=== China ===
In Chinese Buddhism, Vayu is known as Fengtian (風天) is sometimes rarely classified as being one of the Twenty-Four Protective Deities (Chinese: 二十四諸天; pinyin: Èrshísì Zhūtiān). When he is included in this grouping, the other deities enshrined as part of this grouping include twenty-three devas, which include Dazizaitian (Maheśvara), Fantian (Brahma), Dishitian (Sakra), Jixiang Tiannü (Lakshmi), Biancaitian (Saraswati), the Four Heavenly Kings, Ritian (Surya), Yuetian (Chandra), Miji Jingang (Guhyapāda), Sanzhi Dajiang (Pañcika), Weituo (Skanda), Ditian (Prthivi), Puti Shushen, Guizimu (Hārītī), Molizhitian (Mārīcī), Yanluo Wang (Yama), Huotian (Agni), Shuitian (Varuna), Yishenatian (Isana), Luochatian (Rakshasa) and Shensha Dajiang. Examples of this grouping include statues at Shanhua Temple and Tiefo Temple, both in Shanxi, China.

=== Japan ===
In Japanese Buddhism, especially Mikkyō traditions such as Shingon, he is usually classified as one of the Twelve Devas (Japanese: 十二天, romanised: Jūniten) grouped together as directional guardians. He presides over the northwest direction.

In Japan, he is called Fūten (風天). He is included with the other eleven devas, which include Taishakuten (Śakra/Indra), Katen (Agni), Enmaten (Yama), Rasetsuten (Nirṛti/Rākṣasa), Ishanaten (Īśāna), Bishamonten (Vaiśravaṇa/Kubera), Suiten (Varuṇa), Bonten (Brahmā), Jiten (Pṛthivī), Nitten (Sūrya/Āditya) and Gatten (Candra).

== See also ==
- List of wind deities
- Maruts
- Rudras
- Rudra, the Vedic wind or storm God
- Vayu Purana
- Vayu-Vata
- Nusa Bayu
- Fūjin, Shinto Kami of winds
- Aeolus
