= Savitr =

Vedic Hindu deity

Savitra
- God of the Sunrays
- Member of Adityas
- Abode: Sun
- Mantra: Gayatri mantra

Genealogy
- Parents: Kashyapa (father); Aditi (mother)
- Consort: Pṛśni (according to Bhagavata Purana)
- Children: Sāvitrī, Vyāhṛti and Trayī (daughters); 9 sons including Agnihotra, Paśu, Soma and Cāturmāsya (according to Bhagavata Purana)

Savitṛ (Sanskrit: सवितृ IAST: Savitṛ, nominative singular: सविता IAST: Savitā, also rendered as Savitur or Savitar), in Vedic scriptures is an Aditya (i.e., an "offspring" of the Vedic primeval mother goddess Aditi). His name in Vedic Sanskrit connotes "impeller, rouser, vivifier."

He is sometimes identified with—and at other times distinguished from—Surya, "the Sun god". When considered distinct from the Sun proper, he is conceived of as the divine influence or vivifying power of the Sun. The Sun before sunrise is called Savitr, and after sunrise until sunset it is called Sūrya. Savitr is venerated in the Rig Veda, the oldest component of the Vedic scriptures. He is first recorded in book three of the Rigveda; (RV 3.62.10) later called the Gayatri mantra. Furthermore, he is described with great detail in Hymn 1.35 of the Rig Veda, also called the Hymn of Savitr. In this hymn, Savitr is personified and represented as a patron deity. He is celebrated in eleven whole hymns of the Rig Veda and in parts of many others texts, with his name being mentioned about 170 times in aggregate.

Savitr disappeared as an independent deity from the Hindu pantheon after the end of the Vedic period, but is still worshiped in modern Hinduism and is referred to as Sāvitrī.

== Rigvedic deity ==
Savitr is a deity whose name primarily denotes an agent, in the form of a noun derived from a verbal root with the agent suffix -tṛ added. The name of Savitr belongs to a class of Vedic theonyms, together with Dhatṛ, Tratṛ and Tvastr. These names denote that these are agent gods, who create, protect, and produce, respectively.

=== Appearance ===
Savitr has golden arms, and is broad-handed or beautiful-handed. He is also pleasant tongued or beautiful-tongued, and is once called iron-jawed. His eyes are golden as well. He is yellow-haired, an attribute shared with Agni and Indra. He dons on a tawny garb. He has a golden chariot with a golden axle, which is omni-form, just as he himself is capable of assuming all forms. His channel is analogized as a resplendent chariot drawn by two radiant steeds or by two or more bronze, white-footed stallions. Mighty splendour ("amati") is preeminently attributed to Savitr, and mighty "golden" splendour to him only. Such splendour he stretches out or diffuses. He illumines the air, heaven and earth, the world, the spaces of the earth, the vault of heaven.

=== Functions ===
Like Pushan and Surya, he is lord of that which is mobile and is stationary. Savitr has been attributed to as upholding the movables and immovable, which signifies the maintenance of Ṛta. Savitr is a beneficent god who acts as protector of all beings, who are provident and guard the world of spirits. Being an Aditya, Savitr is true to the Eternal Order and act as the score exacter.

His primordial pathways in the air are dustless and sleekly traversed, on them he is besought to fortify his invokers. He is prayed to convey the departed soul to where the righteous dwell. Savitr bestows immortality on the gods as well as length of life on man. He also bestowed immortality on the Rbhus, who by the greatness of their deeds advanced to his dwelling. Like other gods, Savitr is a supporter of the cosmos. Also, he holds the whole world, a role which was also assigned to Vishnu in the Vedas.

=== Abstract classification ===
There are two classes of deities in the Rig Veda whose nature is founded on abstraction.

- The first class, consisting of the direct personifications of abstract notions – such as 'desire' – is rare, occurring only in the very latest hymns of the Rig Veda and due to that growth of speculation which is so plainly traceable in the course of the Vedic age.
- The second and more numerous class comprises deities whose names primarily either denote an agent, in the form of a noun derived from a root with the suffix "-tṛ" (such as Dhatr, 'Creator') or designate some attribute, such as Prajapati ('Lord of Creatures').

The class, judged by the evolution of the mythological creations of the Veda, does not represent direct abstractions, but appears in each case to be derived from an epithet applied to one or more deities, illustrating a particular aspect of activity or character. Such epithets gradually become detached, finally attaining an independent status. Thus Rohita, the 'Red One' (whose female form is Rohinī), originally an epithet of the sun, as a separate deity in the capacity of a Creator.

... [the] second class of gods, who may be called 'abstract', is afforded by the agent gods – such as Dhatr – whose name expresses a function which they perform; ... they can be called 'functional gods'. In all the cases which are to be found in the Vedic literature we are able to say with a fair degree of plausibility that the conception formed itself from the use of the epithet in question, in the first place, of some concrete god; ... after denoting that deity in the special field of action, it was gradually made into a separate deity, concerned merely with the sphere of action in question. This, however, cannot be proved beyond doubt: It will, for instance, always be open to question whether Savitr is really an aspect of the sun, or whether he is god of stimulation, who by reason of similarity of nature has been made 'like to the sun'. In other cases there can be less doubt: The god Visnu cannot really be explained as a god of 'wide stepping' – he is a sun god, who happens to have a special sphere of activity ...

Savitr is never mentioned as having part in the Soma sacrifice

a fact which is doubtless fair evidence that the Rig Veda did not know him as having a place in the rite, and that he was later brought in, perhaps because of his growing importance, perhaps as an Aditya."

=== Solar aspects ===
According to Yaska, Sanskrit scholar of the 5th century BCE, who made various attempts to interpret difficult Vedic mythologies in his work Nirukta (Etymology) (12, 12), the time of Savitr’s appearance is when darkness has been removed. Sayanacharya (on Rig Veda) remarks that before his rising the sun is called Savitr, but from his rising to his setting, Surya. But Savitr is also sometimes spoken of as "sending to sleep", and must therefore be connected with evening as well as morning. He is, indeed, extolled as the setting sun in one hymn (2, 38); and there are indications that most of the hymns addressed to him are meant for either a morning or an evening sacrifice. He brings all two-footed and four-footed beings to rest and awakens them. He unyokes his steeds, brings the wanderer to rest; at his command night comes; the weaver rolls up her web and the skilful man lays down his unfinished work. Later the west was wont to be assigned to him, as the east to Agni, and the south to Soma.

The epithet "sūrya-raśmi" is used in the Rig Veda only once, and it is applied to Savitr:

"Radiating with the beams of the Sun, golden-haired, Savitr raises up His effulgence continually from the east."

Like Surya, Savitr is implored to remove evil nightmares and to render men sinless. Savitr drives away sorcerers and antagonism. He observes fixed laws. The waters and the wind are subject to his ordinance. He leads the waters and by his propulsion they flow broadly. The other gods follow his lead. No being, not even Indra, Varuna, Mitra, Aryaman, Rudra, can resist his will and independent dominion. His praises are celebrated by the Vasus, Aditi, Varuna, Mitra and Aryaman. He is lord of all things worthy, and bestows blessings pervading heaven, air, earth.

... the connection of Savitr with the sun is fairly close. It is at least possible, therefore, that in its origin Savitr was not an independent creation, but was an epithet of Surya, but that question is of little importance: The essential feature of the god is not his original basis, but his function as the inspirer or impeller to holy sacrifice: The ritual act is repeatedly said in the Yajur Veda to be done ‘on the instigation of the god Savitr’.

In several passages of the Rig Veda, Savitr and Surya appear simultaneously. It may even appear based on A.B. Keith's opinion that the terms Savitar and Surya are used interchangeably in certain hymns of the Rig Veda. However it is worth noting that several other deities are directly associated with the epithet of Savitar in the Family Books. They include Indra who is paired alongside Savitar, and Tvastr who is compounded with Savitar. Furthermore, Savitar is unambiguously identified with Bhaga. Savitar is also unambiguously called Pusan and Mitra. While Savitar certainly has directly been charged with using Surya's rays, Savitar has a much more direct congruence with other deities. The Vedic poet observes:

"[G]od Savitr has raised aloft his brilliance, making light for the whole world; Surya shining brightly has filled heaven and earth and air with his rays."

In another hymn Surya is spoken of in terms Prasavitṛ (Vivifier), an adjective usually applied to Savitr, and in the third verse Savitr is apparently mentioned as the same god as Surya. In other hymns also, it is hardly possible to separate the two deities. In certain passages, Savitr combines with the rays of the sun or shines with the rays of the sun.

Savitr has a major role in creation. The relevant hymn mentions that: "Indra measured six broad spaces, from which no existing thing is excluded: He it is who made the wide expanse of earth and the lofty dome of the sky, even he." Savitr assisted Indra in shaping the universe.

[T]here are in the last book of the Rig Veda some hymns which treat the origin of the world philosophically rather than mythologically. Various passages show that in the cosmological speculation of the Rig Veda The sun was regarded as an important agent of generation. Thus he is called the soul (atma) of all that moves and stands. Statements such as that he is called by many names though one indicate that his nature was being tentatively abstracted to that of a supreme god, nearly approaching that of the later conception of Brahma. In this sense the sun is once glorified as a great power of the universe under the name of the golden embryo, hiranya-garbha, in Rig Veda. It is he who measures out space in the air and shines where the sun rises. In the last verse of this hymn, he is called Prajapati, lord of created beings, the name which became that of the chief god of the Brahmanas. It is significant that in the only older passage of the Rig veda in which it occurs, Prajapati is an epithet of the solar deity Savitr, who in the same hymn is said to rule over what moves and stands.

=== Other names and epithets ===
Apam napat (Born of the Waters)
Savitr is at least once. called "apam napat" (Child of Waters), an epithet applied to Agni and Soma as well.

God of the Middle Region
Commentator Yaska commenting on the verse where Savitr is attributed with causing rain, regards Savitr as belonging to the mesial region (or atmosphere) for possessing this ability, adding that the Adityas, who are in heaven, are also called Savitr. It is probably owing to this epithet and because Savitr’s paths are said to be in the atmosphere, that this deity occurs among the gods of the mesial expanse among those of outer space in the Naighantuka.

Prajapati
Savitr is once depicted as the Prajapati of the world. In the Satapatha Brahmana (v. 12, 3, 5), Savitr has been identified with Prajapati and in the Taittiriya Brahmana (v. 1, 6, 4), it has been stated that Prajapati becoming Savitr created living beings.

Damunas (Domestic)
In the Rig Veda, Savitr has been twice spoken of as domestic ("damunas"), an epithet otherwise almost entirely limited to Agni.

Asura
Like many other gods, Savitr is mentioned as ‘asura’ in many hymns of the Rig Veda.

Pusan
Savitr alone is the lord of vivifying power and on account of his movements (yamabhih), he becomes Pusan. In two consecutive verses, Pusan and Savitr are described as connected. In the first the favour of Pusan who sees all beings is invoked, and in the second, Savitr is besought to stimulate the thoughts of worshipers who desire to think of the excellent brilliance of the Deva. The latter verse is the celebrated Savitri, now termed as the Gayatri mantra, with which Savitr was in later times invoked at the beginning of Vedic study.

Mitra
Savitr is also said to become Mitra by reason of his laws.

Bhaga
Savitr seems sometimes to be identified with Bhaga also, unless the latter word is here only an epithet of Savitr. The name of Bhaga, the good god bestowing benefits is indeed often added to that of Savitr so as to form the single expression Savitr Bhaga or Bhaga Savitr, with the term Bhaga simply acting as a qualitative and attributive adjective.

== Savitr in the Brahmanas ==
The Vedas do not specifically identify the Ādityas as there is no classification of the thirty-three gods, except for in the Yajurveda (7.19), which says that there are eleven gods in heaven (light space), eleven gods in the atmosphere (intermediate space), and eleven gods on earth (observer space). In some passages of the Satapatha Brahmana, the number of Ādityas is eight, and in other passages twelve Ādityas are mentioned.

Savitr disappears in post-Vedic literature and is absent from the corpus of Pauranic Hinduism.

== Hindu revivalism ==
Some modern Hindu spiritual thinkers assign symbolism to the Vedic deities like Savitr. The Vedic deities are not only forces of nature, but also forces that exist within the human intellect and psyche, and help the individual in spiritual progress.

According to Sri Aurobindo, the Vedic depictions are deeper than mere imagery. The gods, goddesses and the evil forces mentioned in the Vedas represent various cosmic powers. They play a significant role in the drama of creation, preservation, and destruction in the inner world of a human being.

Once the senses are controlled and the mind is stabilized through slaying of all the dark powers, comes the awakening, the goddess Ushas (the Dawn), who brings along with her Ashvins (lords of bliss and vital strength) into the world of inner consciousness. After Ushas appears Aditi, the infinite Mother of the gods: First as Savitr, the Creator or Wisdom-Luminous, who represents the divine power essential for manifestation, and then as Mitra, who as the divine Love and Harmony is considered as a friend of the illumined mind (Indra) and his associates. The Sun is of Truth, after which appear Rta (Truth in Action) and Rtachit (Truth consciousness).

== Popular culture ==
In DC Comics' The Flash comics and The CW's The Flash TV series, the speedster Savitar is an enemy of the Flash who named himself after the Hindu god.

In a fiction by author Ryan Sequeira, called "EvOLv", where Savitr has been named as one of the Supreme Gods - parallel with Shiva - The God Savitr is referred to as the source of light in the multiverse.

In the Dark-Hunter fantasy series by author Sherrilyn Kenyon, Savitar is a Chthonian god killer who is thousands of years old and was responsible for policing the Atlantean pantheon.

For the second and all subsequent seasons of the television series Battlestar Galactica, Richard Gibbs composed new opening music whose words come from the Sāvitrī Mantra. A literal translation of the verse can be given as: "May we attain that excellent glory of Savitar the god: so may he stimulate our prayers."

== See also ==
- List of solar deities
