= Aryaman (given name) =

Indian male given name

- Pronunciation: Aaryman
- Gender: Male

Origin
- Origin: Sanskrit
- Meaning: Companion, Close friend, Sun, Play-Fellow
- Region of origin: India

Other names
- Related names: Ayushman Aryan

Aryaman (/ˈɑːrjəmən/ or /ˈæ-/, Hindi: आर्यमन) is a male given name popular in parts of India. It originates from the name of the Hindu deity Aryaman, and is of Sanskrit origin.
