= Dyaus =

Vedic god of the sky

- Personification of the Sky
- Member of Thirty-three gods
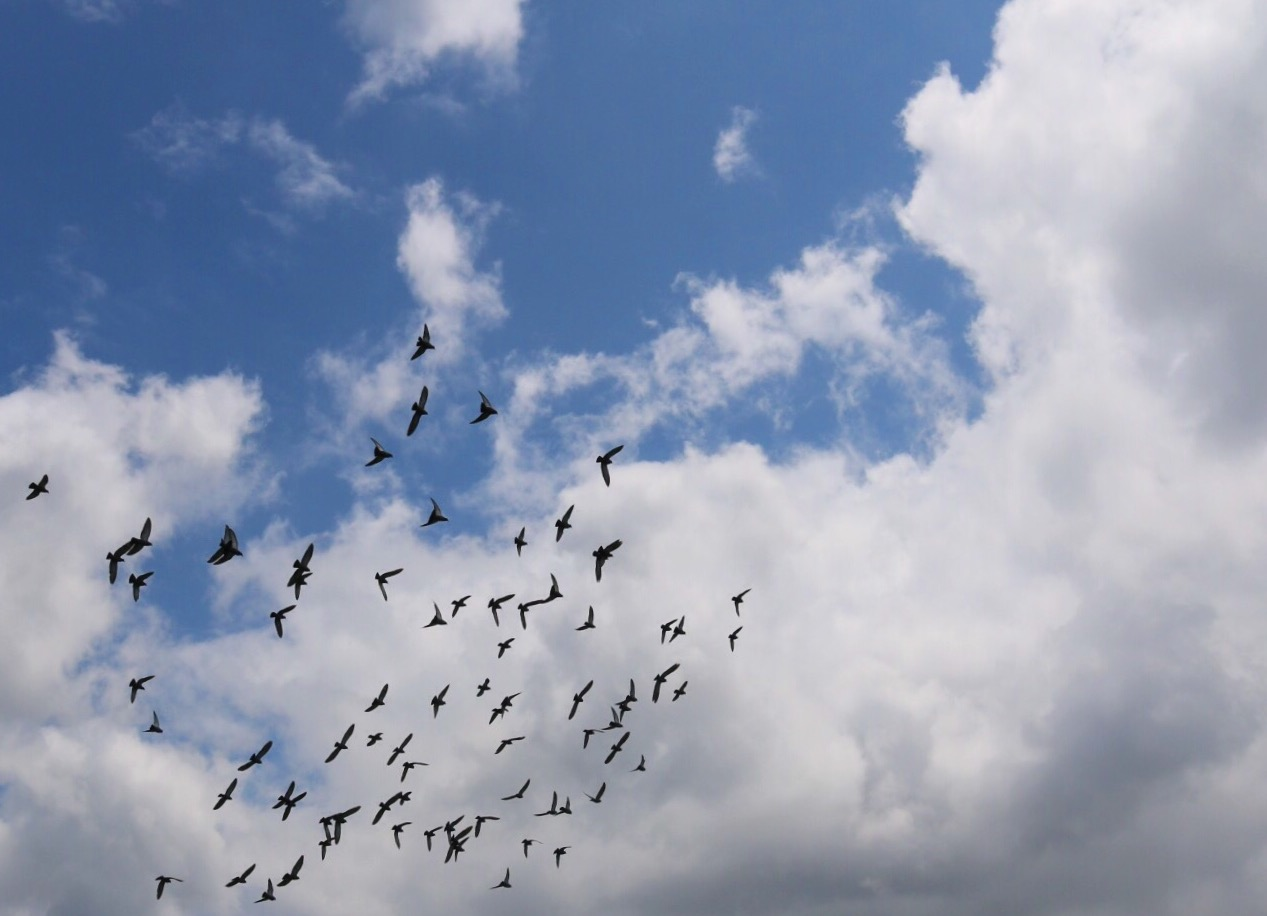
- The sky over India
- Other names: Akasha, Prabhasa
- Devanagari: द्यौस्
- Affiliation: Deva; Pancha Bhuta; Vasu
- Abode: Dyuloka, Sky (ākāśa, आकाश)
- Symbol: Bull
- Texts: Rigveda, Mahabharata
- Gender: Male

Genealogy
- Consort: Prithvi
- Children: Indra, Surya, Ushas, and the other gods

Equivalents
- Greek: Ouranos (Functional equivalent); Zeus (mainly etymological)
- Indo-European: Dyēus
- Norse: Odin (as the Father of the gods); Tyr (mainly etymological)
- Roman: Caelus (Functional equivalent); Jupiter (mainly etymological)

Dyaus (Vedic Sanskrit: द्यौस्, IAST: Dyáus) or Dyauspitr (Vedic Sanskrit: द्यौष्पितृ, IAST: Dyáuṣpitṛ́) is the Rigvedic sky deity. His consort is Prithvi, the earth goddess, and together they are the archetypal parents in the Rigveda.

== Etymology ==
Dyauṣ stems from Proto-Indo-Iranian *dyā́wš, from the Proto-Indo-European (PIE) daylight-sky god *Dyēus, and is cognate with the Greek Διας – Zeus Patēr, or Dei-pátrous, and Latin Jupiter (from Old Latin Dies piter Djous patēr), stemming from the PIE Dyḗus ph₂tḗr ("Daylight-sky Father").

The noun dyaús (when used without the pitṛ́ 'father') refers to the daylight sky, and occurs frequently in the Rigveda, as an entity. The sky in Vedic writing was described as rising in three tiers: avamá, madhyamá, and uttamá or tṛtī́ya.

== Literature ==
Dyáuṣ Pitṛ́ appears in hymns with Prithvi Mata, 'Mother Earth' in the ancient Vedic scriptures of Hinduism.

In the Ṛg·veda, Dyáuṣ Pitṛ́ appears in verses 1.89.4, 1.90.7, 1.164.33, 1.191.6, 4.1.10. and 4.17.4 He is also referred to under different theonyms: Dyavaprithvi, for example, is a dvandva compound combining 'heaven' and 'earth' as Dyauṣ and Prithvi.

Dyauṣ's most defining trait is his paternal role. His daughter, Uṣas, personifies dawn. The gods, especially Sūrya, are stated to be the children of Dyauṣ and Prithvi. Dyauṣ's other sons include Agni, Parjanya, the Ādityas, the Maruts, and the Angirases. The Ashvins are called "divó nápāt", meaning offspring/progeny/grandsons of Dyauṣ. Dyauṣ is often visualized as a roaring animal, often a bull, who fertilizes the earth. Dyauṣ is also known for the rape of his own daughter, which Jamison and Brereton (2014) state is "obliquely but vividly" mentioned in the Rigveda.

Dyauṣ is also stated to be like a black stallion studded with pearls in a simile with the night sky.

Indra's separation of Dyauṣ and Prithvi is celebrated in the Rigveda as an important creation myth.

In the Mahabharata, Bhishma is the human incarnation of Dyaus after the Vasus got cursed to live a human life on earth for stealing from Vasishtha out of pride and desire. 7 of the Vasus got forgiven quickly but Dyaus, the one who lead the act by physically stealing from Vasistha, was singled out to remain on earth for a long duration, while the others were liberated shortly after birth. Dyaus incarnated as Devavrata, who later became known as Bhishma.

== See also ==
- Dyēus
- Dis Pater
- Rigvedic deities
- Uranus (mythology)
