= Anila =

One of the Vasus of Hindu mythology

- Devanagari: अनिल
- Sanskrit transliteration: anila
- Affiliation: Vasus

Anila (Sanskrit: अनिल, romanized: Anila) is one of the Vasus in Hinduism, the gods of the elements of the cosmos. He is often associated with the wind god Vayu, regarded to be a form of the deity when numbered among the Vasus.
