= Rudras =

Group of Hindu gods

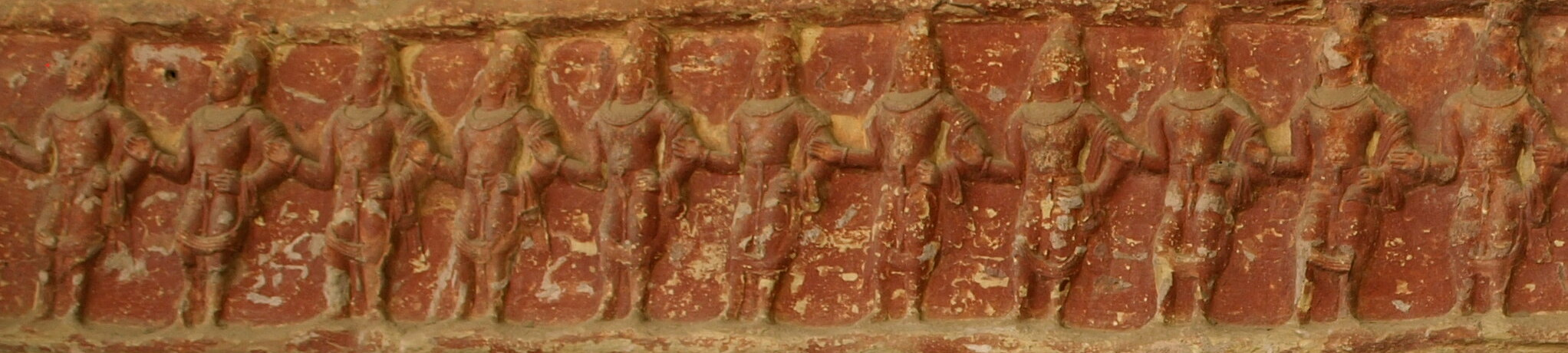
The 11 Rudras depicted with a third eye and ithyaphallic, Udayagiri Caves, c. 401 CE

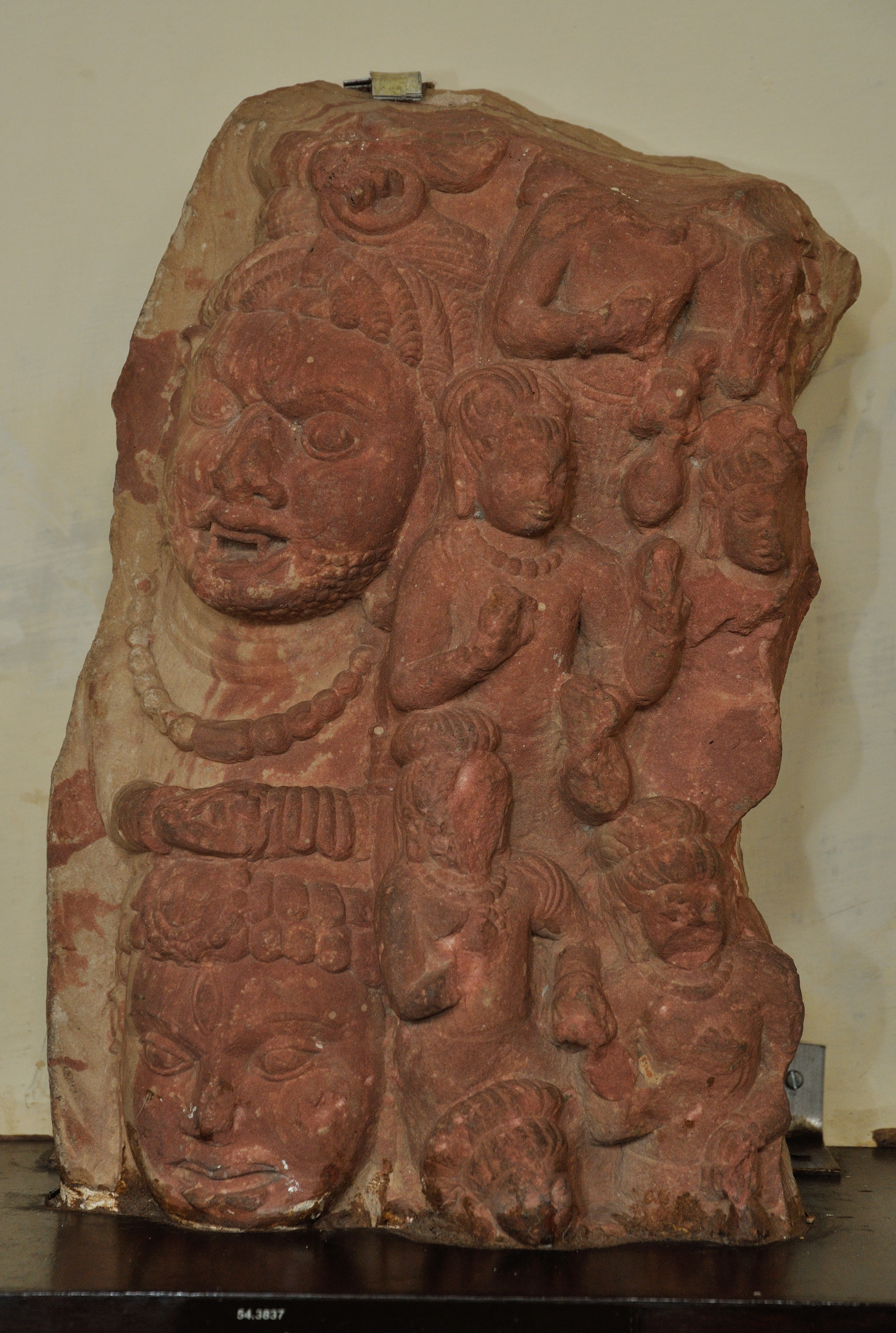
Part of the Vyomamandala depicting Rudras - Circa 5th Century CE, Katra Keshava Deva; currently at Mathura Museum.

Rudras refer to the demigods, ganas or followers of the god Rudra, whose traditions have since been associated with Shiva. They make up eleven of the thirty-three gods in the Vedic pantheon. They are at times identified with the storm deities referred to as Maruts, while at other times considered distinct from them.

While the Vamana Purana describes Rudras as the sons of Kashyapa and Aditi, Maruts are described distinct from the Rudras as the 49 sons of Diti, sister of Aditi, and the attendants of Indra, rather than Rudra.

== Birth and names ==
The Ramayana tells they are eleven of the 33 children of the sage Kashyapa and his wife Aditi, along with the 12 Adityas, 8 Vasus and 2 Ashvins, constituting the Thirty-three gods. The Vamana Purana describes the Rudras as the sons of Kashyapa and Aditi. The Matsya Purana notes that Surabhi – the mother of all cows and the "cow of plenty" – was the consort of Brahma and their union produced the eleven Rudras. Here they are named

1. Nirṛti
2. Śambhu
3. Aparājita
4. Mṛgavyādha
5. Kapardin
6. Dahana
7. Khara
8. Manas
9. Ahirbudhnya
10. Kapālin
11. Piṅgala
12. Senāni

The Harivamsa, an appendix of the Mahabharata, makes Kashyapa and Surabhi – here, portrayed as his wife – the parents of the Rudras. In another instance in the Mahabharata, it is Dharma (possibly identified with Yama) who is the father of the Rudras and the Maruts.

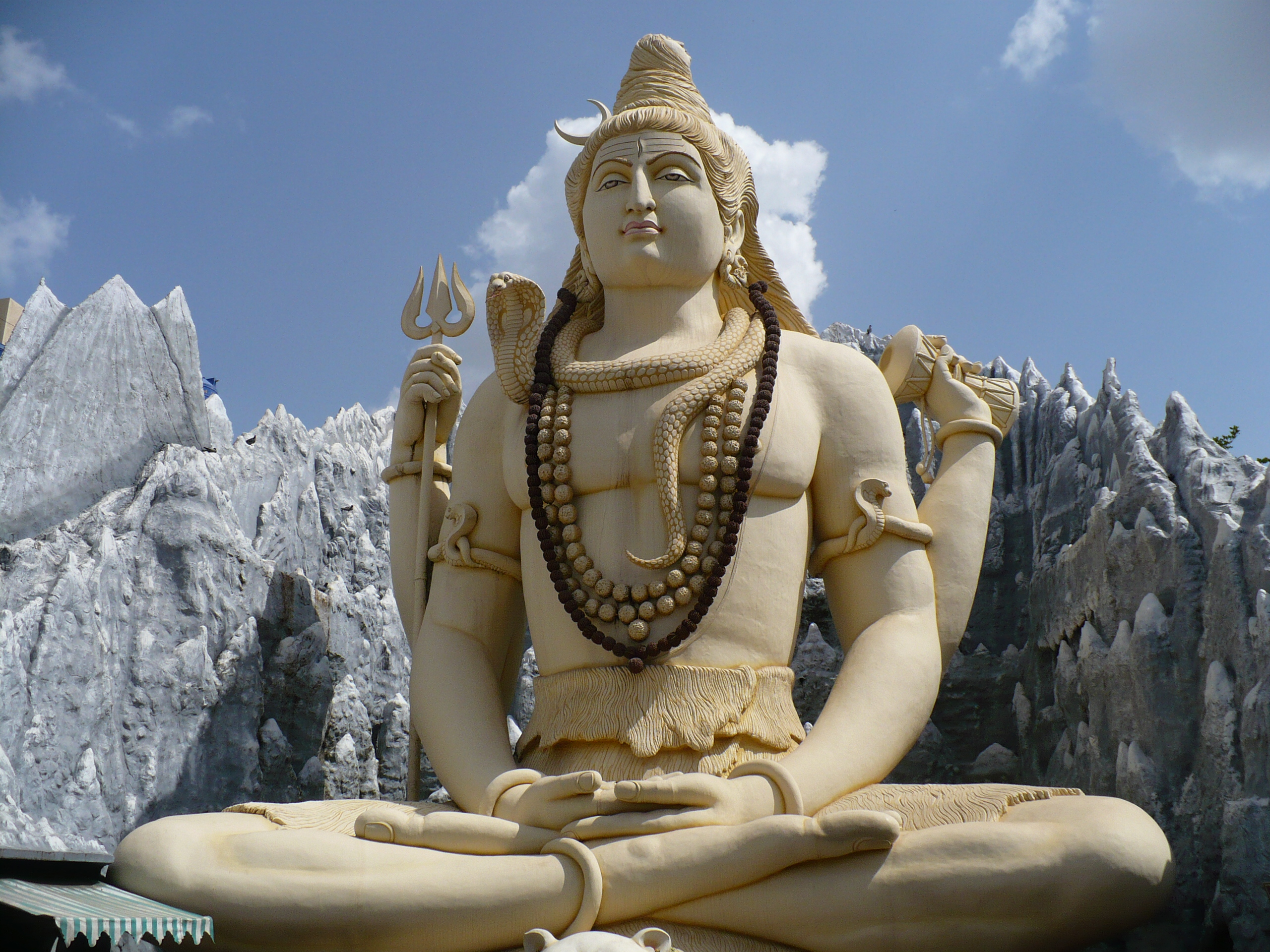
Rudra, identified with the Puranic Shiva (pictured) is associated with the Rudras.

The Vishnu Purana narrates that Rudra – here identified as Shiva . The furious Rudra was in Ardhanari form, half his body was male and other half female. He divided himself into two: the male and female. The male form then split itself into eleven, forming the eleven Rudras. Some of them were white and gentle; while others were dark and fierce. They are called:

1. Manyu
2. Manu
3. Mahmasa
4. Mahan
5. Shiva
6. Ṛtudhvaja
7. Ugraretas
8. Bhava
9. Kāma
10. Vāmadeva
11. Dhrtavrata

From the woman were born the eleven Rudranis who became wives of the Rudras. They are:

1. Dhi
2. Vrtti
3. Usana
4. Urna
5. Niyuta
6. Sarpis
7. Ila
8. Ambika
9. Iravatl
10. Svadha
11. Diksa

Brahma allotted to the Rudras the eleven positions of the heart and the five sensory organs, the five organs of action and the mind. Other Puranas call them Aja, Ekapada, Ahirbudhnya, Tvasta, Rudra, Hara, Shambhu, Tryambaka, Aparajita, Ishana, Tribhuvana.

In one instance in the epic Mahabharata, the Rudras are eleven in number and are named:

1. Mrgavyadha
2. Sarpa
3. Nirriti
4. Ajaikapad
5. Ahi
6. Ahirbudhnya
7. Pinakin
8. Dahana
9. Ishvara
10. Kapāli
11. Sthanu
12. Bhaga

While Kapālin is described the foremost of Rudras here, in the Bhagavad Gita, it is Śankara who is considered the greatest of the Rudras. Both Kapalin and Śankara are epithets of Shiva. In another instance, they are described as sons of Tvashtr and named:

1. Vishvarupa
2. Ekapada
3. Ahirbudhnya
4. Virupaksa
5. Raivata
6. Hara
7. Bahurupa
8. Tryambaka
9. Savitra
10. Jayanta
11. Pinakin

While usually the Rudras are described to eleven, in one instance in the Mahabharata; they are said to be eleven thousand and surrounding Shiva, which is another name for Rudra. The eleven groups of hundred are named:

1. Ekapada
2. Ahirbudhnya
3. Pinakin
4. Rta
5. Pitrupa
6. Tryamabaka
7. Maheshvara
8. Vrishakapi
9. Shambhu
10. Havana
11. Ishvara

The Bhagavata Purana Canto 3 Chapter 3 mentions that Rudra is born from the anger of Lord Brahma. The names are mentioned in Canto 3 Chapter 3 and Verse 12 as follows:

1. Manyu
2. Manu
3. Mahinasa
4. Mahān
5. Śiva
6. Ṛtadhvaja
7. Ugraretā
8. Bhava
9. Kāla
10. Vāmadeva
11. Dhṛtavrata

In Bhagavata Purana Canto 6 Chapter 6 the eleven Rudras are said to be the children of Sarūpā and Bhūta. Sarūpā was a daughter of Daksa. The names of the eleven Rudras given in Canto 6 Chapter 6 Verse 17-18 are:

1. Raivata
2. Aja
3. Bhava
4. Bhīma
5. Vāma
6. Ugra
7. Vṛṣākapi
8. Ajaikapāt
9. Ahirbradhna
10. Bahurūpa
11. Mahān

The Matsya Purana mentions the ferocious eleven Rudras – named:

1. Kapāli
2. Pingala
3. Bhima
4. Virupaksha
5. Vilohita
6. Ajapada
7. Ahirbhudhnya
8. Shasta
9. Shambhu
10. Chanda
11. Bhava

Aiding the god Vishnu in his fight against the demons and killing all of them along with him. They wear lion-skins, matted-hairs and serpents around their necks. They have yellow throats, hold tridents and skulls and have the crescent moons on their foreheads. Together headed by Kapali, they slay the elephant demon Gajasura.

== Associations ==
In Vedic scriptures, Rudras are described as loyal companions of Rudra, who later was identified with Shiva. They are considered as divine aids, messengers and forms of Rudra. They are fearsome in nature. The Shatapatha Brahmana mentions that Rudra is the prince, while Rudras are his subjects. They are considered as attendants of Shiva in later mythology.

The Rigveda and the Krishna Yajurveda makes the Rudras the gods of the middle world, situated between earth and heaven i.e. the atmosphere. As wind-gods, the Rudras represent the life-breath. In the Brihadaranyaka Upanishad, the eleven Rudras are represented by ten vital energies (rudra-prana) in the body and the eleventh one being the Ātman (the soul).

The Rudras are said to preside over the second stage of creation and the intermediary stage of life. They govern the second ritual of sacrifice, the mid-day offering and the second stage of life – from the 24th to the 68 year of life. The Chandogya Upanishad prescribes that the Rudras be propitiated in case of sickness in this period and further says that they on departing the body become the cause of tears, the meaning of the name Rudra being the "ones who make cry". The Brihadaranyaka Upanishad explicitly states the fact that since the Rudras leaving the body – causing death – makes people cry, they are Rudras.

The Mahabharata describes the Rudras as companions of Indra, servants of Shiva and his son Skanda and companions of Yama, who is surrounded by them. They have immense power, wear golden necklaces and are "like lighting-illuminated clouds". The Bhagavata Purana prescribes the worship of the Rudras to gain virile power.

=== Association with Maruts ===
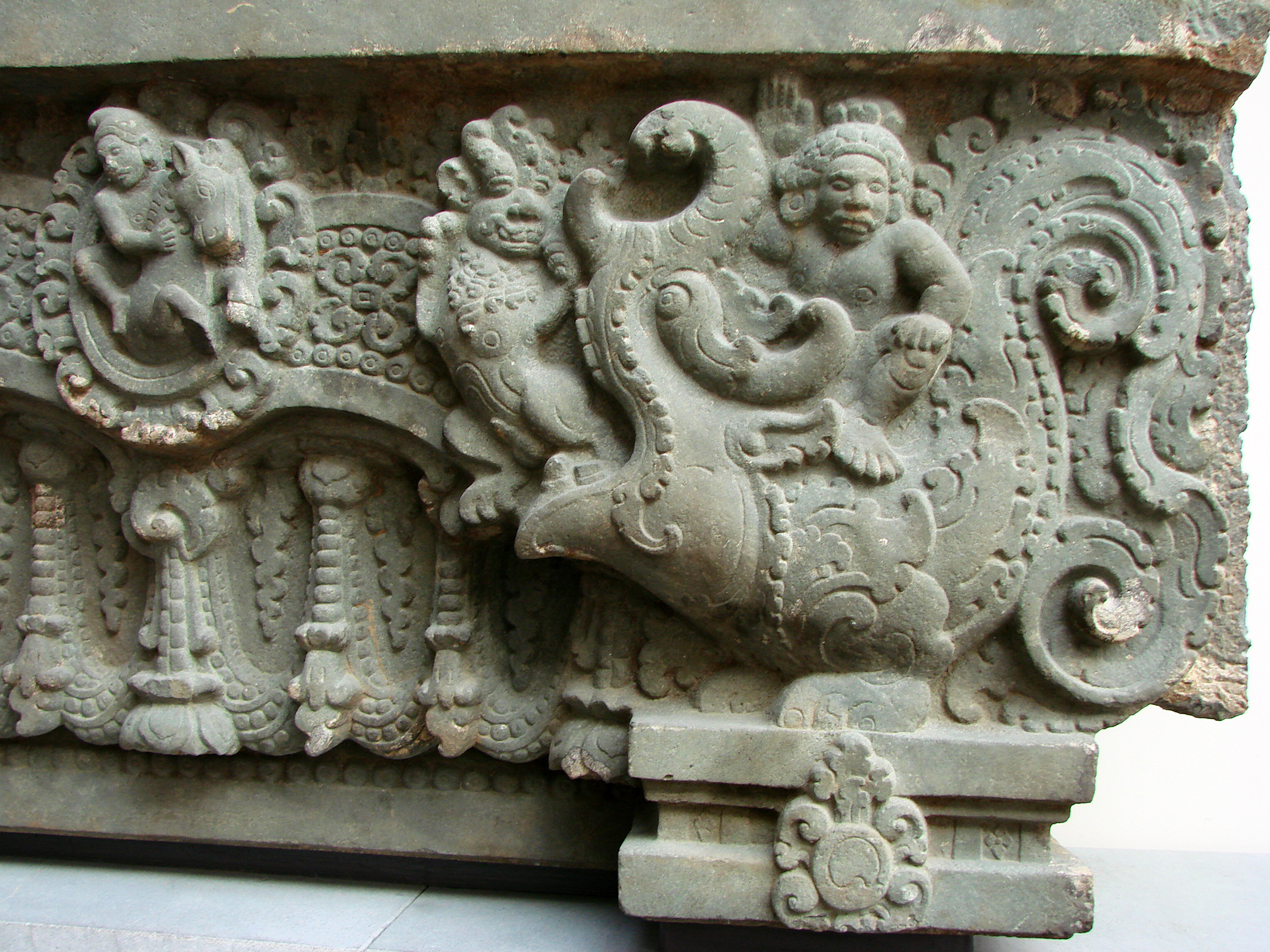
Maruts

Rudras are at times identified with the Maruts – sons of Rudra in the Vedas; while at other times, considered distinct from them.

Some scholars believe that Rudras and Maruts could be distinct groups, Rudras being the true followers of Rudra and daivic (Godly) in nature. But poets of the Rigveda declared the Maruts to take the position of the Rudras in order to give status to the Vedic god Rudra. Later in post-Vedic literature like the epics and Puranas, Maruts were associated with Indra, while Rudras gained their former status as followers of Rudra, who had evolved into Shiva. However, other scholars disregard this theory and consider that originally Rudras and Maruts were identical. A theory suggests that slowly in the Vedas two classes of Maruts came into existence: the friendly and beneficent, and the roaring and turbulent; the latter grew into the distinct group of deities called the Rudras, who were associated only with the wild Rudra.

In the Marut Suktas (RV 1, 2, 5, 8) and Indra-Suktas (RV 1, 3, 8, 10) of the Rigveda (RV), the epithet "Rudras" – originating from the verb root rud or ru and meaning howlers, roarers or shouters – is used numerous times for the Maruts – identifying them with the Rudras even when associated with Indra, rather than Rudra. There are some hymns in the Rigveda (RV 2, 7, 8, 10) that explicitly distinguish between the Maruts and the Rudras.

While the Vamana Purana describes Rudras as the sons of Kashyapa and Aditi, Maruts are described distinct from the Rudras as 49 sons of Diti, sister of Aditi and attendants of Indra.

== Ashwatthama ==
Ashwatthama, the son of Drona, is the avatara of the eleven Rudras, along with being one of the eight Chiranjivi (the immortals). Drona performed many years of severe penances to please Shiva in order to obtain a son who possessed the same valiance as the latter. Ashwatthama, the powerful son of Drona, though known as the part incarnate of Rudra, was really born of the four parts of Yama (death), Rudra (destruction), Kamadeva (love), Krodha (anger). Just before Mahabharata war, Bhishma himself declared that it would be virtually impossible for anyone to kill or defeat Ashwatthama in battle as he was the part incarnate of Rudra. Bhishma stated that when Ashwatthama becomes angry, it would become impossible to fight him as he would become "a second Shiva". The dishonoured deaths of Drona, Karna, Duryodhana left Aswathama infuriated, and this event led directly and in an unwary-like manner, to the annihilation of most of the Pandava lineage by the hands of Ashwatthama himself, who killed all of them. As a result, Krishna curses him as being unable to heal his bleeding sores without facing death until the end of the Kali Yuga. It is said that one can hear him wailing at nights in the Kurukshetra region.

== See also ==
- Thirty-three gods
- Adityas
- Vasus
- Ashvins
- Indra
- Prajapati
- Maruts
