= Dharā =

Class of Hindu god representing the Earth

In Hinduism, Dharā (Sanskrit: धरा; Support) is one of the Vasus, gods of the physical cosmos. He represents the earth and the element earth, though Earth is usually the goddess Prithvi rather than a god. Dhārā (Sanskrit: धारा) is a Sanskrit term used to refer to the flow of a stream or waterfall.
