= Vasu =

Group of deities in Hinduism

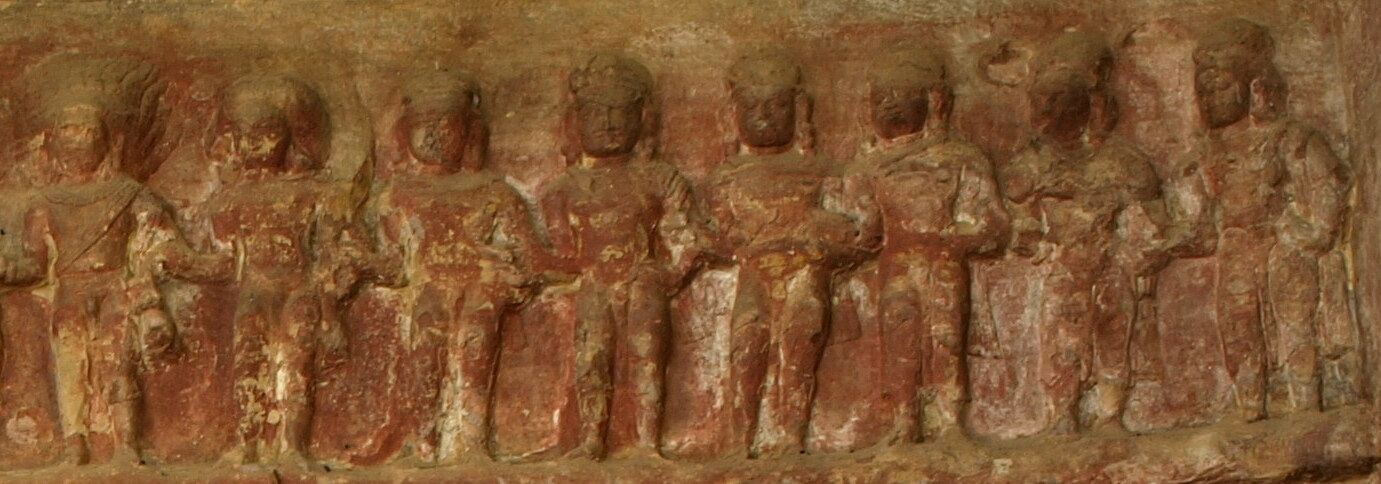
Agni, Vayu and other Vasus, Udayagiri Caves, c. 401 CE

The Vasus (Sanskrit: वसु, romanized: Vasu) are a group of deities in Hinduism associated with fire and light. They are described as the attendant deities of Indra, and later Vishnu. Generally numbering eight and classified as the Ashtavasu, they are described in the Ramayana as the children of Kashyapa and Aditi, and in the Mahabharata as the sons of Manu or Dharma and a daughter of Daksha named Vasu. They are eight among the thirty-three gods featured in the Vedas.

== Etymology ==
The Sanskrit term Vasu(s) is translated as the "bright ones".

== List ==
There are varying lists of the eight Vasus in different texts, sometimes only because particular deities have varying names. The following are names and meanings according to the Brihadaranyaka Upanishad, Manava Purana, and according to the Mahabharata, as normally equated:

Brihadaranyaka		Manava Purana	Mahabharata
Name	Meaning	Name	Name	Meaning
Prithvi	Earth	Bhumi	Dharā	Earth
Varuna	Water	Samudra	Āpa	Water
Agni	Fire	Agni	Anala/Agni/Pavaka	Fire
Vāyu	Wind	Vayu	Anila	Wind
Āditya	Sun	Amsuman	Pratyūsha	Sun
Dyaus/Akasha	Sky	Akasha	Prabhāsa	Sky/Ether
Chandramas	Moon	Varchas	Soma	Moon
Naksatrani	Stars	Prabhāsa	Dhruva	Motionless/Polaris

Though the Shatapatha Brahmana uses the Brhad-Aranyaka names, most later texts follow the Mahabharata names with the exception that Āpa 'water' usually appears in place of Aha. The Vishnu Purana equates Prabhāsa with the lights of the 27 Nakshatras (Constellations/Lunar Mansions) and Dhruva with Akasha, that is "space", Dhruva seemingly taking over Aha's role when Aha is replaced by Āpa.

== Legend ==
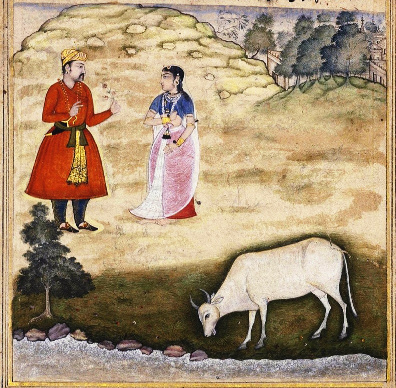
The wife of one of the Vasus is tempted to steal the wish-bearing cow

In the Ramayana the Vasus are children of Aditi and Kashyapa.

The Mahabharata relates how the Vasus, led by "Prithu" (presumably here a male form of Prithvi), were enjoying themselves in the forest, when the wife of Prabhasa (also referred to as Dyaus) spotted a divine cow and persuaded her husband Prabhasa to steal it, which Prabhasa did with the agreement and aid of Prithu and his other brothers. Unfortunately for the Vasus, the cow was owned by the sage Vasishta who learned through his ascetic powers that the Vasus had stolen it. He immediately cursed them to be born on earth as mortals. Vashishta responded to pleading by the Vasus by promising that seven of them would be free of earthly life within a year of being born and that only Prabhasa would pay the full penalty. The Vasus then requested the river-goddess Ganga to be their mother. Ganga incarnated and became the wife of King Shantanu on condition that he never gainsaid her in any way. As seven children were born, one after the other, Ganga drowned them in her own waters, freeing them from their punishment and the king made no opposition. Only when the eighth was born did the king finally oppose his wife, who therefore left him. So the eighth son, Prabhasa incarnated, remained alive, imprisoned in mortal form, and later became known in his mortal incarnation as Bhishma.

== Other uses ==
Vasu is also the name of the eighth chakra (group) of Melakarta ragas in Carnatic music. The names of chakras are based on the numbers associated with each name. In this case, there are 8 Vasus and hence the eighth chakra is Vasu.

== See also ==
- Hindu deities
- List of Hindu deities
- Thirty-three gods
- Adityas
- Rudras
- Ashvins
