= Aditi =

Hindu mother goddess

- Goddess of the sky, consciousness, the past, the future, and fertility
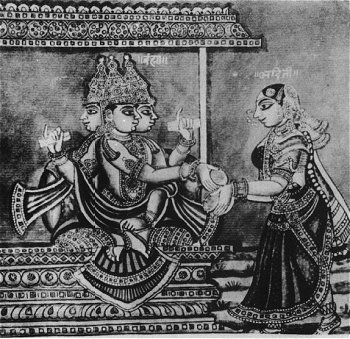
- Aditi praying to the god Brahma
- Affiliation: Devi, Devaki
- Weapons: Sword, Trishula
- Texts: Rigveda, Puranas, Ramayana, Mahabharata

Genealogy
- Parents: Daksha (father); Asikni (mother)
- Siblings: Diti, Kadru, Vinata, Sati, Smriti Swaha, Rohini, Revati, Danu, Muni and many other brothers and sisters
- Consort: Kashyapa
- Children: Adityas,Ashta Vasus (Rishi Dhara vasu, Rishi Dhruva vasu,Rishi Soma vasu,Rishi Aha vasu,Rishi Anila vasu,Rishi Anala vasu,Rishi Pratyusha vasu,Rishi Prabhasa vasu), Bhaga, Amsha, Varuna, Mitra, Aryaman, Martanda

Aditi (Sanskrit: अदिति, lit. 'boundless' or 'limitless' (Note: From a- (privative a and diti "bound," which is from the Proto Indo-European root *da- "to bind.") or 'innocence') is an important Vedic goddess in Hinduism.

She is the personification of the sprawling infinite and vast cosmos. She is the goddess of motherhood, consciousness, unconsciousness, the past, the future, and fertility. She is the mother of the celestial deities known as the Adityas, and is referred to as the mother of many deities. As celestial mother of numerous beings, the synthesis of all things, she is associated with space (akasha) and with mystic speech (Vāc). She may be seen as a feminine form of Brahma, and associated with the primal substance (mulaprakriti) in the Vedanta. She is mentioned more than 250 times in the Rigveda, the verses replete with her praise.

== Family ==
Aditi is the daughter of Daksha and Asikni (Panchajani). The Puranas, such as the Shiva Purana and the Bhagavata Purana, suggest that Daksha married all of his daughters off to different people, including Aditi and 12 others to sage Kashyapa. When Kashyapa was living with Aditi and Diti in his ashrama, he was really pleased with Aditi's services, and told her to ask for a boon. Aditi prayed for one ideal son. Accordingly, Indra was born. Later, Aditi gave birth to the twelve adityas, namely Varuna, Parjanya, Mitra, Amsha, Pushan, Dhatri, Aryaman, Surya, Bhaga, Savitr, Vamana, and Viṣṇu.

== Origin ==
The first mention of Aditi is found in Rigveda, which is dated by mainstream consensus to have been composed between 1800 and 1200 BCE. She is portrayed as the mother of the Adityas, a group of societal Rigvedic deities, including Varuna, Mitra, Aryaman, Daksha, Bhaga, Amsha, and sometimes Surya and Savitar. As the mother of the societal deities, she represented the compliance to social behavior. Her motherhood was also an important attribute, and later was expanded so that she became the mother of all deities.

According to the Shatapatha Brahmana (a commentary on the Shukla Yajurveda), Aditi is also invoked during ritual sacrificial offerings as being synonymous with the Earth:

'On the navel of the earth I place thee!' And further, 'In the lap of Aditi (the boundless or inviolable earth)!' for when people guard anything very carefully, they commonly say that 'they, as it were, carried it in their lap;' and this is the reason why he says, 'In the lap of Aditi!'

— Satapatha Bramanda (translator Julius Eggeling, 1882), 1:1:2:23

== Attributes ==
=== Motherhood ===
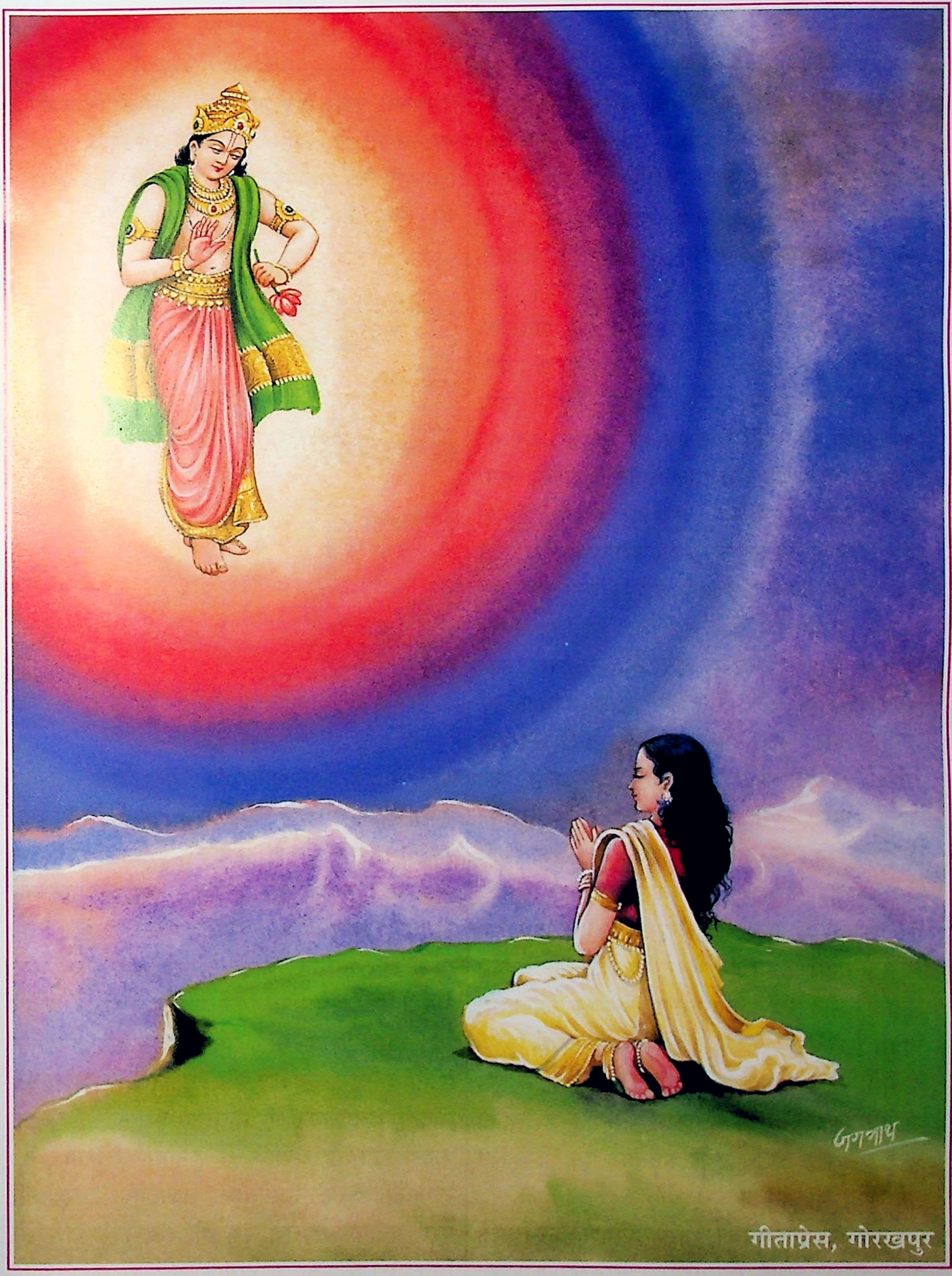
Aditi prays to Surya

Aditi and the sage Kashyapa had 33 sons, out of whom twelve are called Ādityas including Surya, eleven are called Rudras, and eight are called Vasus. Aditi is said to be the mother of the great god Indra, the mother of kings (Mandala 2.27) and the mother of gods (Mandala 1.113.19). In the Vedas, Aditi is Devamata (mother of the celestial gods) as from and in her cosmic matrix all the heavenly bodies were born. She is preeminently the mother of 12 Âdityas, whose names include Vivasvān, Aryamā, Pūṣā, Tvaṣṭā, Savitar, Bhaga, Dhātā, Varuṇa, Mitra, and Śakra.

She is also the mother of the Vamana, avatar of Vishnu. Accordingly, the Vamana avatar, as the son of Aditi was born in the month of Shravana (fourth month of the Hindu Calendar, also called Avani) under the star Shravana. Many auspicious signs appeared in the heavens, foretelling the good fortune of this child.

In the Rigveda, Aditi is one of the most important figures of all. As a mothering presence, Aditi is often asked to guard the one who petitions her (Mandala 1.106.7; Mandala 8.18.6) or to provide him or her with wealth, safety, and abundance (Mandala 10.100; 1.94.15).

=== Creativity ===
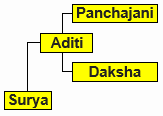
Family tree of Aditi

Aditi is usually mentioned in the Rigveda along with other gods and goddesses. There is no one hymn addressed exclusively to her, unlike other Vedic gods. Since She is perhaps not related to a particular natural phenomenon like other gods. Compared to Ushas and Prithvi, Aditi can be defined as the cosmic creator.

The verse "Daksha sprang from Aditi and Aditi from Daksha" is seen by Theosophists as a reference to "the eternal cyclic re-birth of the same divine Essence" and divine wisdom.

=== Freedom ===
The name Aditi includes the root "da" (to bind or fetter) and suggests another attribute of her character. As A-diti, she is an unbound, free soul and it is evident in the hymns to her that she is often called to free the petitioner from different hindrances, especially sin and sickness. (Mandala 2.27.14). In one hymn, she is asked to free a petitioner who has been tied up like a thief (Mandala 8.67.14). As one who unbinds, her role is similar to her son Varuna's as guardian of Rta, cosmic moral order. She is called the supporter of creatures (Mandala 1.136).

=== Others ===
Like many other Hindu gods and goddesses, Aditi has a vahana (a mount). Aditi flies across the boundless sky on a phoenix. The phoenix symbolizes strength, honour, but most importantly, reflects Aditi's nature of cyclical rebirth and infinite creation.

Her weapons include the famous trishula, and a sword.

Aditi is described to possess a pair of earrings, which are stolen from her by the asura named Naraka. Krishna returns the earrings to her after slaying the asura with his consort, Satyabhama.

== Worship ==
A well known old temple of Aditi is located near rock cut cave in Vizhinjam, Kerala.

== See also ==
- Payovrata
- Adityas
- Surya Namaskar
- Sun worship in Hinduism
- List of solar deities in Hinduism
- List of Surya temples
- List of Hindu deities
- List of Hindu pilgrimage sites
- List of Hindu temples
