= Bhaga =

Hindu god associated with fortune

- God of Wealth
- Affiliation: Adityas
- Planet: Sun

Genealogy
- Parents: Kashyapa (father); Aditi (mother)
- Spouse: Siddhi (according to Bhagavata Purana)
- Children: Mahiman, Vibhu and Prabhu (sons); Āśis (daughter)

Bhaga (Sanskrit: भग), is the Vedic god of wealth, as well as a term for "lord, patron" and "wealth, prosperity". He is an Āditya, a group of societal deities who are the sons of Aditi. Bhaga's responsibility was to make sure that people received a share of the goods in life. He is associated with his brother, Aryaman, regarding the expectation of a successful marriage.

== Etymology ==
The cognate term in Avestan and Old Persian is baga, of uncertain meaning but used in a sense in which "lord, patron, sharer/distributor of good fortune" might also apply. It is related to the Indo-Iranian bhag. The cognate in Slavic languages is the root bogъ ("god"). The semantics is similar to English lord (from hlaford "bread-warden"), the idea being that it is part of the function of a chieftain or leader to distribute riches or spoils among his followers. The name of the city of Baghdad derives from Middle Persian bag-dād, "lord-given". There are a number of other locations whose names are compounds of the Middle Persian word bagh, including Baghlan and Bagram in Afghanistan, Baghshan in Iran, and Baghdati in Georgia, which share the same etymological Iranic origins.

== Role ==
=== In Sanskrit religious literature ===
In the Rigveda Samhita, Bhaga is invoked and praised as the "sustainer of the world", "giver of wealth", "chief leader of rites", and "possessor of opulence". He is asked to bestow upon his adherents cattle and horses, male issue, felicity, and riches.

In the Sanskrit Rigveda, bhaga is an epithet of both mortals and gods (e.g. of Savitr, Indra and Agni) who bestow wealth and prosperity, as well as the personification of a particular god, the Bhaga, who bestows the same. In the Rigveda, the personification is attested primarily in RV 7.41, which is devoted to the praise of the Bhaga and of the deities closest to him, and in which the Bhaga is invoked about 60 times, together with Agni, Indra, the dual Mitra-Varuna, the two Ashvins, Pusan, Brahmanaspati, Soma and Rudra. Bhaga is also invoked elsewhere in the company of Indra, Varuna and Mitra (e.g. RV 10.35, 42.396). The personification is occasionally intentionally ambiguous, as in RV 5.46 where men are portrayed as requesting the Bhaga to share in bhaga. In the Rigveda, the Bhaga is occasionally associated with the sun: in RV 1.123, the Dawn (Ushas) is said to be the Bhaga's sister, and in RV 1.136, the Bhaga's eye is adorned with rays.

The 5th/6th-century BCE Nirukta (Nir. 12.13) describes Bhaga as the god of the morning. In the Rigveda, the Bhaga is named as one of the Adityas, the seven (or eight) celestial sons of Aditi, the Rigvedic mother of the gods. In the medieval Bhagavata Purana, the Bhaga reappears with the Puranic Adityas, which are by then twelve solar gods.

== Legacy ==
Elsewhere, the Bhaga continues as a god of wealth and marriage, in a role that is also attested for the Sogdian (Buddhist) equivalent of the Bhaga.

The common noun bhaga survives in the 2nd century CE inscription of Rudradaman I, where it is a fiscal term; in bhagavan for "one who possesses (-van) the properties of a bhaga-", hence itself "lord, god"; and in bhagya, and "that which derives from bhaga", hence "destiny" as an abstract noun, and also Bhagya personified as the proper name of a son of Surya.

Bhaga is sometimes said to be the presiding deity of the Purva Phalgunī Nakshatra based on Rg Veda. However, based on other texts, such as the nakshatra-focused Taittiriya Brahmanam, Bhaga presides over Uttara Phalgunī.
