= Tvashtr =

Artisan god in Vedic Hinduism

- The Heavenly Builder; The Maker of Divine Implements; Lord of the Womb
- Affiliation: Deva
- Weapon: Metal Axe
- Texts: Purusha Sukta, Mahabharata, Puranas

Genealogy
- Parents: Itihasa-Puranic: Kasyapa and Aditi
- Consort: Rechana (daughter of Prahlada)
- Children: Vedic: Saranyu, Visvarupa, Vritra and sometimes Indra and Brihaspati Itihasa-Puranic: Sanjna, Trishiras and Vritra

Equivalents
- Greek: Hephaistos
- Norse: Völund
- Roman: Vulcanus
- Slavic: Svarog

Tvashtr (Sanskrit: त्वष्टृ, IAST: Tvaṣṭṛ) or Tvashta (Sanskrit: त्वष्टा, IAST: Tvaṣṭā) is a Vedic Hindu artisan god or fashioner. Tvashtr is sometimes identified with another artisan deity named Vishvakarma.

== In Vedic literature ==
In the Rigveda, Tvashtr is stated to be a skillful craftsman who created many implements, including Indra's bolt, the axe of Brihaspati, and a cup for divine food and drink. He is stated to be the creator of forms, and is often stated to be the crafter of living beings and wombs. He is also considered a universal father, and an ancestor of humans through his daughter Saranyu. He is the father of Bṛhaspati, and likely Indra's father as well. He wields a metal axe, and rides a chariot pulled by two fallow bay mares.

He is the guardian of Soma, and his son Vishvarupa is the guardian of cows. Indra has a conflict with his likely father Tvashtr, with him stealing Tvashtr's soma and trying to possess Vishvarupa’s cattle. Indra is consistently victorious in the conflict, and Tvashtr is stated to fear Indra. In the Taittiriya Samhita and Brahmanas, Vishvarupa is killed by Indra, and so Tvashtr does not allow Indra to attend his Soma sacrifice. Indra however, steals and drinks the soma through his strength. In order to have revenge for the murder of his son Vishvarupa, Tvashtr creates a demon called Vritra. However, when wishing him into existence, Tvashtr makes a mispronunciation in his incantation, which allows Indra to defeat Vritra.

Tvashtr is associated with many other deities, Pushan, Savitr, Dhatr, Prajapati, and Vishvakarman, due to his role as a fashioner.

He is mentioned in the RigVeda 1.61.6 as follows:

Devanagari

अस्मा इदु त्वष्टा तक्षद्वज्रं स्वपस्तमं स्वर्यं रणाय ।
वृत्रस्य चिद्विदद्येन मर्म तुजन्नीशानस्तुजता कियेधाः ॥

IAST

asmā idu tvaṣṭā takṣadvajraṃ svapastamaṃ svaryaṃ raṇāya.
vṛtrasya cidvidadyena marma tujannīśānastujatā kiyedhāḥ.

English

Even for him hath Tvastar forged the thunder, most deftly wrought, celestial, for the battle,
Wherewith he reached the vital parts of Vrtra, striking-the vast, the mighty with the striker.

He is mentioned as an Aditya (sons of goddess Aditi) in later Hindu scriptures like the Mahabharata and Puranas, though his significance gets reduced.

== See also ==
- Tuisto
