= Dhata =

Hindu god, son of Aditi

- Affiliation: Adityas
- Color: yellow
- Texts: Vedas, Mahabharata, Ramayana, Puranas
- Gender: male

Genealogy
- Parents: Kashyapa (father); Aditi (mother)
- Siblings: Adityas
- Consorts: Kuhu; Sinivali; Raka; Anumati
- Children: Sayam; Darsha; Pratar; Purnamasa

In Hinduism, Dhata (Sanskrit: धाता) or Dhatr (Sanskrit: धातृ) is the name of the solar deity, one of the Adityas. He is also a god of health and magic. He is invoked in tantra by drawing tantras and chanting Vedic hymns. Often invoked during major yagnas such as Ashwamedha yagna.

Dhata is evidenced as an Aditya in both Hindu epics - the Mahabharata and the Ramayana. He is described to fought Arjuna and Krishna in burning of Khandava Forest episode in the epic Mahabharata. The Bhagavata Purana also mentions Dhata as the seventh son of Aditi and Kashyapa. In this text, he has four wives — Kuhu, Sinivali, Raka, and Anumati — who gave birth to his sons — Sayam, Darsha, Pratar and Purnamasa respectively. In the Agni Purana, he is associated with the colour yellow and the zodiac cancer.
