= Adityas =

Class of Hindu deities

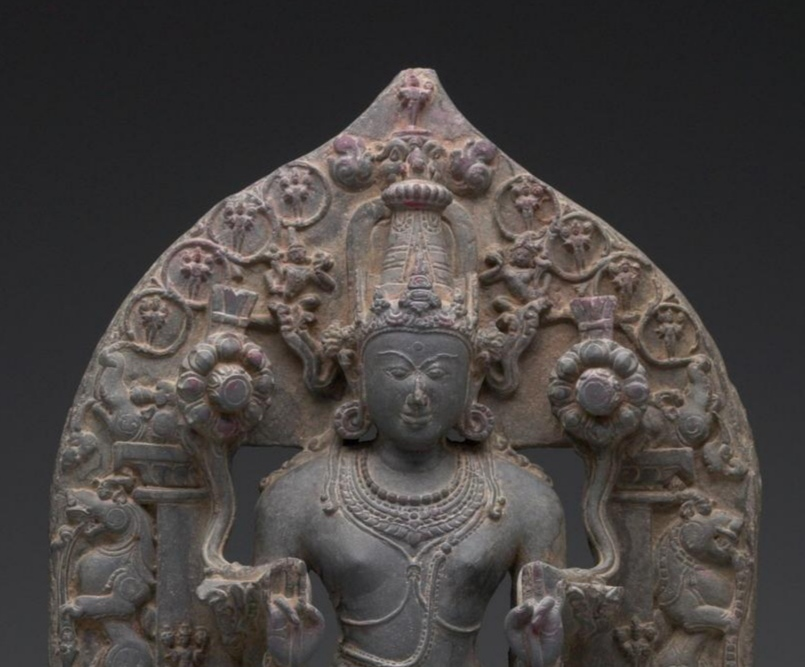
An 11th–century sculpture of Surya with eleven other Adityas depicted at the top

Adityas (Sanskrit: आदित्य, lit. 'of Aditi' IAST: Āditya Sanskrit pronunciation: [aːd̪ɪt̪jɐ]) refers to a class of Hindu deities. They are usually presented as solar deities, and the offspring of the Goddess Aditi. The name Aditya, in the singular, is taken to refer to the sun god Surya. They are first attested in the Rig Veda, where they are 6–8 in number, all male. The number increases to 12 in the Brahmanas. The epic Mahabharata and the Puranic scriptures mention the sage Kashyapa as their father, and in these texts, the group generally consist of Vivasvan (Surya), Aryaman, Tvashtr, Savitr, Bhaga, Dhatr, Mitra, Varuna, Amsha, Pushan, Indra and Vishnu (in the form of Vamana). In each month of the year a different Aditya is said to shine.

== Sun worship ==
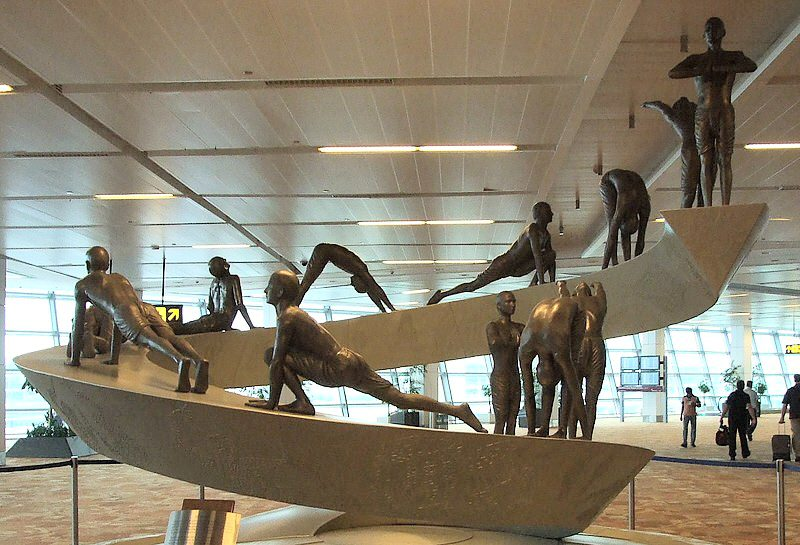
Sculpture of the 12 asanas of one form of Surya Namaskar (Note: Incorporating Ashtanga Namaskara in place of Caturanga Dandasana) in Indira Gandhi Airport, Delhi (figures sculpted by Nikhil Bhandari)

=== Characterisation ===
The Aditya have been described in the Rig Veda as bright and pure as streams of water, free from all guile and falsehood, blameless, perfect.

This class of deities has been seen as upholding the movables and immovable Dharma. Adityas are beneficent gods who act as protectors of all beings, who are provident and guard the world of spirits and protect the world. In the form of Mitra-Varuna, the Adityas are true to the eternal Law and act as the exactors of debt.

In present-day usage in Sanskrit, the term Aditya has been made singular in contrast to Vedic Adityas, and is being used synonymously with Surya, the Sun. The twelve Adityas are believed to represent the twelve months in the calendar and the twelve aspects of Sun. Since they are twelve in number, they are referred as DvadashAdityas.

The 12 Adityas are basically the monthly suns, corresponding to the approximately 12 lunations in a solar year. (Note: The actual value is close to 12 7/19; 7/19 ≈ 1/3 ; so there always 12 complete lunar months in a solar year, and about every third year there is an extra, 13 th lunar month, which the assignment of deities to months does not appear to address.) These are also called the 12 purushas, pertaining to the 12 lunar months of the year. Here the months refer to the lunar months. In astronomy the lunar months with a solar sankranti are said to have an Aditya or purusha. The month without a sankranti is said to be neuter and an extra month or the intercalary lunar month.

=== Mentions in Hindu scriptures ===
The Ādityas are one of the principal deities of the Vedic classical Hinduism belonging to the solar class. In the Vedas, numerous hymns are dedicated to Mitra, Varuna, Savitr, etc.

In hymn 7.99 of the Rigveda, Indra-Vishnu produces the sun, his discus a vestige of his solar creation, equivalent to the sun. The Vishnu Purana identifies the discus Sudarshana Chakra with the following: 'thoughts, like the chakra, flow faster than even the mightiest wind.'

The Gayatri mantra, which is regarded as one of the most sacred of the Vedic hymns is dedicated to Savitr, one of the principal Ādityas. The Adityas are a group of solar deities, from the Brahmana period numbering twelve. The ritual of Surya Namaskaram, performed by Hindus, is an elaborate set of hand gestures and body movements, designed to greet and revere the Sun.

The sun god in Hinduism is an ancient and revered deity. In later Hindu usage, all the Vedic Ādityas lost identity and metamorphosed into one composite deity, Surya, the Sun. The attributes of all other Ādityas merged into that of Surya and the names of all other Ādityas became synonymous with, or epithets of, Surya.

The Ramayana has Rama as a direct descendant of the Surya, thus belonging to the Suryavamsha or the Solar dynasty. Karna from the Mahabharata, is the son of the Pandava mother Kunti and Surya.

The sun god is said to be married to the goddess Sanjna. She is depicted in dual form, being both sunlight and shadow, personified. The goddess is revered in Gujarat and Rajasthan.

The charioteer of Surya is Aruna, who is also personified as the redness that accompanies the sunlight in dawn and dusk. The sun god is driven by a seven-horsed Chariot depicting the seven days of the week and the seven colours of rainbow which are seen due to the dispersion by Surya's rays.

=== Surya Namaskaram ===
Surya Namaskaram, the Salute to the Sun or Sun Salutation, is worship of sun which is also included as a practice in yoga as exercise incorporating a flow sequence of some twelve gracefully linked asanas. Similar exercises were in use in India, for example among wrestlers. The basic sequence involves moving from a standing position into Downward and Upward Dog poses and then back to the standing position, but many variations are possible. The set of 12 asanas is dedicated to the solar deity Surya. In some Indian traditions, the positions are each associated with a different mantra.

=== Sun worship festivals ===
Makar Sankranti is a festival dedicated to sun worship in India and by the Hindu diaspora.

Chhath (Hindi: छठ, also called Dala Chhath) is an ancient Hindu festival dedicated to Surya, the chief solar deity, unique to Bihar, Jharkhand and the Terai. This major festival is also celebrated in the northeast region of India, Madhya Pradesh, Uttar Pradesh, and parts of Chhattisgarh. Hymns to the Sun can be found in the Vedas, the oldest sacred texts of Hinduism. Practiced in different parts of India, the worship of the Sun has been described in the Rigveda. There is another festival called Sambha-Dasami, which is celebrated in the state of Odisha for the surya.

The sun is prayed to by South Indians during the harvest festival. In Tamil Nadu, the Tamil people worship the sun god during the Tamil month of Thai, after a year of crop farming. The month is known as the harvesting month and people pay respects to the sun on the first day of the Thai month known as Thai pongal, or Pongal, which is a four-day celebration. It is one of the few indigenous forms of worship by the Tamil people irrespective of religion.

== Names of solar deities ==
The lists that composed the Adityas in religious texts are not always consistent, and vary greatly across iterations through a combination of factors. In the Rigveda, the Adityas are seven or eight in number. In the Satapatha Brahmana, the number of Adityas is eight in some passages, and in other texts of the same Brahmana, twelve Adityas are mentioned. In the Chandogya Upanishad, Aditya is a name of Viṣṇu in his avatar as Vāmana, and his mother is Aditi. The Adityas in the Vishnu Purana are twelve in number. In the Bhagavata Purana, the Adityas are associated with each month of the year, it is a different Aditya who shines as the Sun-God (Surya). According to the Linga Purana, the Adityas are twelve in number, again.

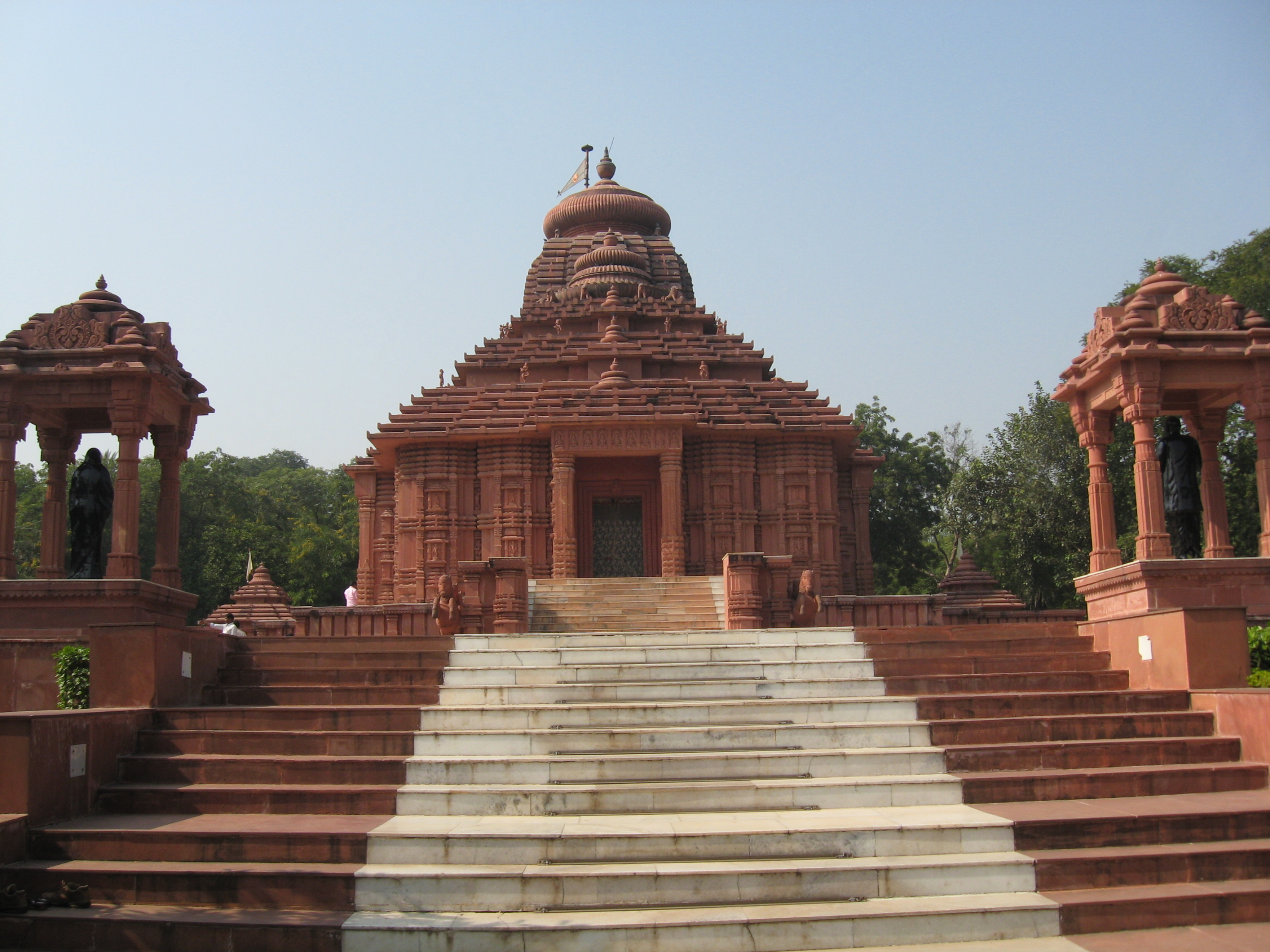
The Sun Temple of Gwalior is modelled after the famous Konark.

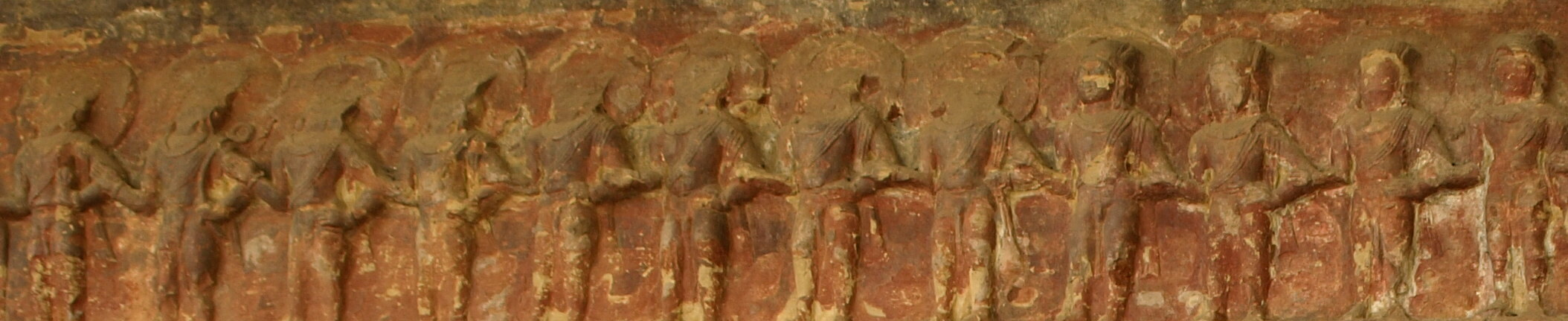
The 12 Adityas with solar halos, Udayagiri Caves, c. 401 CE

Aditya (including other names)	Placements						Actions (Bhagavata Purana)
Aditya (including other names)	Rigveda	Brahmanas	Upanishads	Vishnu Purana	Bhagavata Purana	Linga Purana	Actions (Bhagavata Purana)
Varuna; Varuṇa	1	5		5	10	5	he is in the waters and
Mitra	2	11		11	11	11	he is in the moon and in the oceans
Aryaman	3	2		2	6		he is in the wind
Daksha; Dakṣa	4						
Bhaga	5	7		7	7	7	he is in the body of all living beings
Amsha; Ansa; Aṃśa; Amshuman	6	10		10		10	he is again in the wind
Martanda	8						
Vivasvat; Vivasvan				9	8	9	he is in fire and helps to cook food
Savitr; Savitṛ	7	8		8		8	
Surya	7	9					
Yama		1					
Indra; Śakra		3		3	1	3	he destroys the enemies of the gods
Ravi		4					
Dhata; Dhatri; Dhūti; Dhātṛ		6		6	2	6	he creates living beings
Arka		9					
Vishnu; Viṣṇu; Vāmana			1 (as Vamana)	1	1	2	he destroys the enemies of the gods
Tvashtr; Tvastar; Tvashtha; Tvaṣṭṛ				4		4	he lives in the trees and herbs
Pushan; Pushya; Pūṣan				12	5	12	he makes foodgrains grow
Parjanya					3		he showers down rain
Brahma						1	

=== Aditya as nakshatra devatas ===
Adityas are responsible for proper functioning of the universe and in Hindu cosmology they are given lordship over celestial constellations, called nakshatras in Jyotish. Nakshatras are forces of universal intelligence which are intertwined with the birth-death cycle of life, identity of all created beings, events and day to day consciousness in our lives. In India, at Konark, in the state of Odisha, a temple is dedicated to Surya. The Konark Sun Temple has been declared a UNESCO World Heritage Site. Surya is the most prominent of the navagrahas or nine celestial objects of the Hindus. Navagrahas can be found in almost all Hindu temples.

Adityas manage the Shakti of the nakshatras. Here are a few examples.

1. Bhaga has lordship over Purva Phalguni nakshatra. Bhaga is bestower of fortune. Bhaga in Sanskrit means "a portion" so our portion in life is regulated by this divine celestial being. Many a times this is related to fortunate marriages, or fortune from marriage and partnerships. It is a very worldly nakshatra bestowing divine intelligence with respect to worldly gains in life. Beings born when Purva Phalguni is rising in the east are literal physical manifestation of this energy.
2. Aryaman, the God of Patronage, is an Aditya who is the lord of Uttara Phalguni nakshatra and as suggested by the name, a person born under the auspices of Aryaman finds many lucky opportunities with benefactors in their lives, among many other qualities that are possessed by this divine being.
3. Savitr, rules over Hasta Nakshatra and is the cheerful Aditya who manages worldly skills and artistry.
4. Mitra, rules over Anuradha nakshatra they are the peacekeepers of this world.
5. Varuna, rules over Shatbhishak nakshatra the nakshatra of 1000 healers and gives a person intelligence about all sorts of medicine. Varuna as its ruling Aditya is lord keeper of law, hence themes of crime and punishment, law and order fall under his rulership.

== See also ==
Sun worship in Hinduism

- Aditi
- List of Surya temples
- Surya Namaskar

Other related

- Ashvins
- Prajapati
- Rudras
- Vasus
- List of Hindu deities
- List of Hindu temples
- List of Hindu pilgrimage sites
