= Aryaman =

Hindu god of customs

- God of Customs; Protector of Mares, Stallions and Milky Way, Wealth
- Member of Adityas
- Affiliation: Adityas, Deva
- Planet: Sun
- Texts: Vedas, Upanishads

Genealogy
- Parents: Kashyapa (father); Aditi (mother)
- Consort: Mātṛkā (according to Bhagavata Purana)
- Children: Garṣaṇi (according to Bhagavata Purana)

Equivalents
- Indo-European: Heryomen

Aryaman (Sanskrit: अर्यमन्‌) is one of the early Rigvedic deities. His name signifies "Life-Partner", "Close Friend", "Sun", "Play-Fellow" or "Companion". He is the third son of Kashyapa and Aditi, the father and mother of the adityas, and is depicted as the mid-morning sun disc. He is the deity of the customs that rule the various Vedic tribes and people. His name is used widely across India for its deep roots in Hindu culture and rituals.

In the Rigveda, Aryaman is described as the protector of mares and stallions, and the Milky Way (aryamṇáḥ pánthāḥ) is said to be his path. Aryaman is commonly invoked together with Mitra-Varuna, Bhaga, Bṛhaspati, and other adityas and asuras.

According to Griffith, the Rigveda also suggests that Aryaman is a supreme deity alongside Mitra and Varuna. According to the Rigveda, Indra, who is traditionally considered the most important deity in the Rigveda, is asked to obtain boons and gifts from Aryaman. Hindu marriage oaths are administered with an invocation to Aryaman being the witness to the event. Aryaman also is the deity of the customs of hospitality.

Aryaman is sometimes said to be the presiding deity of the Uttara Phalgunī Nakshatra based on Rg Veda. However, based on other texts, such as the nakshatra-focused Taittiriya Brahmanam, Aryaman presides over Purva Phalgunī.

== See also ==
- Airyaman
- Amshuman (deity)
- List of solar deities
