= Amsha =

Solar deity in Hinduism

- Affiliation: Adityas
- Planet: Sun
- Parents: Kashyapa and Aditi

Amsha (Sanskrit: अंश, romanized: Aṃśa) is a Vedic deity in Hinduism. He is a member of the Adityas, a group of celestial deities who are the children of goddess Aditi. He is first mentioned in the Rigveda.

== Other uses ==
In Vaishnavism, amsha refers to a being who is regarded to be a partial incarnation or a portion of the deity Vishnu. The term is also used to indicate the portion of a Vedic sacrifice that is offered to the gods. Amsha is also the name of a sage.
