= List of legendary creatures in Hindu mythology =

This is a list of legendary creatures from Indian folklore, including those from Vedic and Hindu mythology, sorted by their classification or affiliation.

== Creatures associated with Animals ==
=== Insects ===
==== Bees and other worldly insects ====
- Bhramari is the goddess of all insects and the goddess of honey bees. She is associated with bees, hornets, ants, locusts, wasps and all the other insects of the entire world, which cling to her body.

==== Scorpions ====
- Chelamma, a scorpion goddess, native to southern Karnataka.

=== Matsya ===
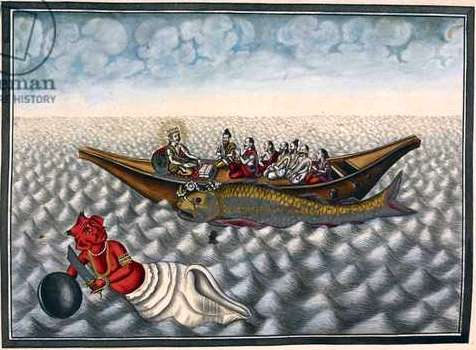
Matsya, who is the first incarnation of Vishnu among his ten main incarnations.

- Matsya is the first incarnation of the Hindu preserver god Vishnu in the form of a fish.
- Timingila is the blue whale that can swallow whole other species of whales in one bite.

==== Matsyāṅganā ====
- Suvannamaccha is a daughter of Tosakanth (Ravana who gets killed by Rama in the end) appearing in the Thai and other Southeast Asian versions of Ramayana. She is a mermaid princess who tries to spoil Hanuman's plans to build a bridge to Lanka but falls in love with and married him instead, thereby allowing the bridge's constructions, seiges, invasions, battles, assassinations of the demon clans ultimately winning.
- Macchanu is the son of Hanuman and Suvanamaccha in the Cambodian, Thai and other Southeast Asian versions of the Ramayana, and who looked like a vanara from the waist-up but had the tail of a fish.

=== Frog ===
- Bheki is the name given to a frog that rules the sun on the horizon in Hindu legend.

=== Reptiles ===
==== Kūrma ====
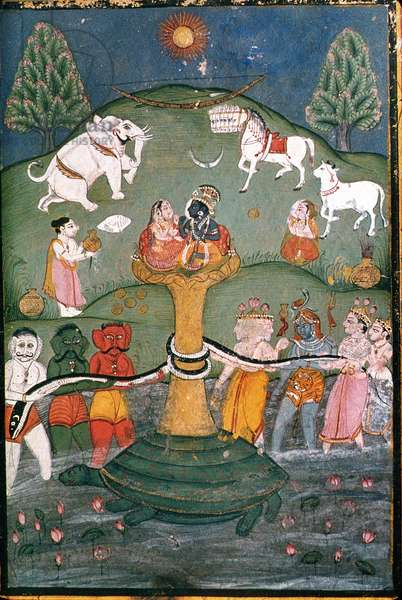
The Second Incarnation of Vishnu as Kurma 'The Sea Turtle' In The Churning of the Ocean (Paint On Paper).

- In Hinduism, Kurma is the second incarnation of Vishnu, in the form of a sea turtle.
- The World turtle in Hindu belief is known as Akupāra, or sometimes Chukva, a Chiranjivi.
- Bedawang or Bedawang Nala is a giant turtle in Balinese mythology who brought the whole world on his back. In the creation mythology of the world, it represents a change from Antaboga. He along with two dragons support the human world. If he moves, there will be earthquakes and volcanic eruptions on earth.

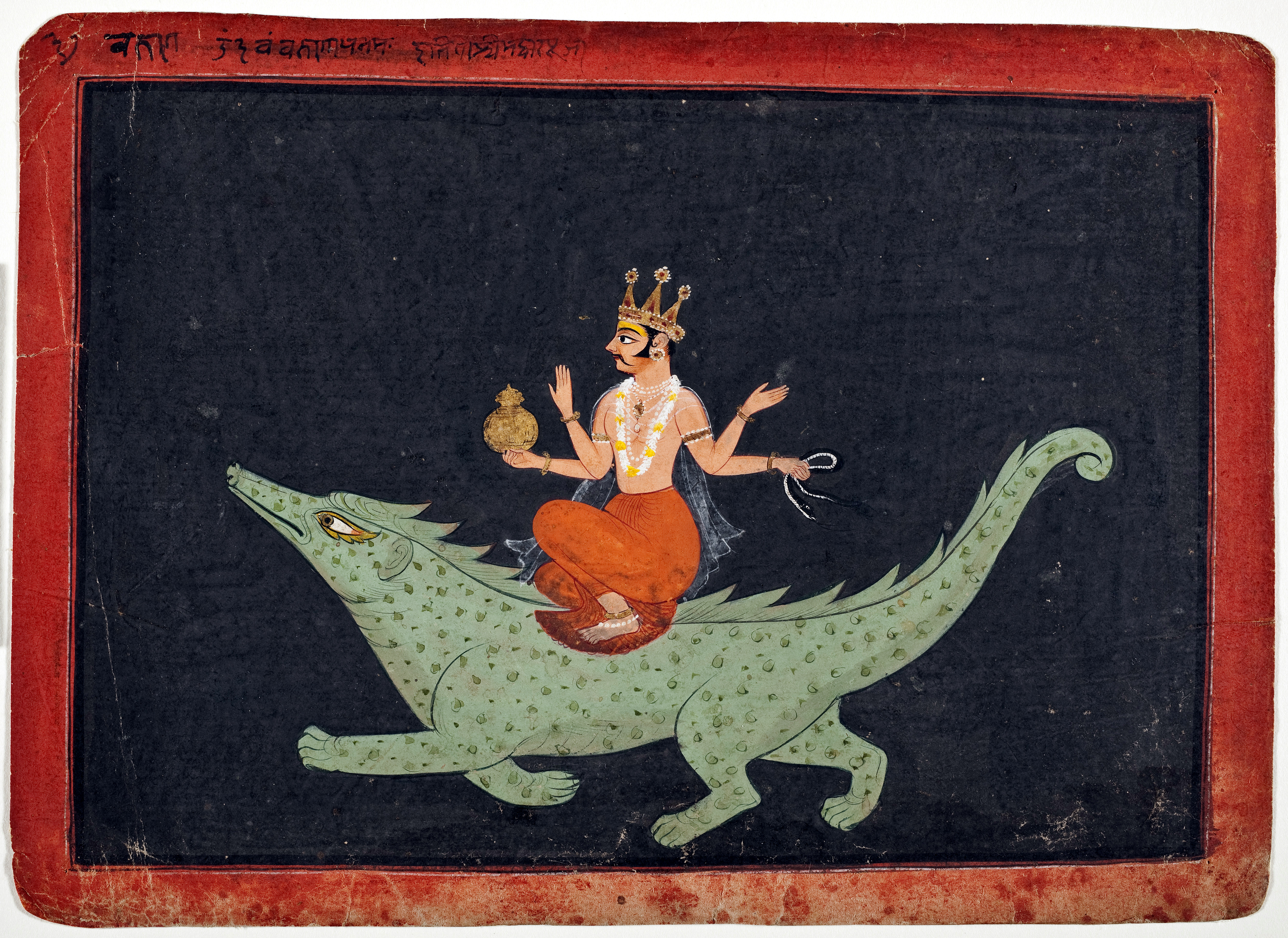
Varuna mounted on his Makara.

- Makara is a water reptile (it is always a crocodile) that appears as the vahana (mount) of several water deities, among them the river goddesses Ganga and Narmada, and Varuna when shown as the sea god.
- Huhu is the crocodile in the legend of the Gajendra Moksha.

==== Sarpa ====
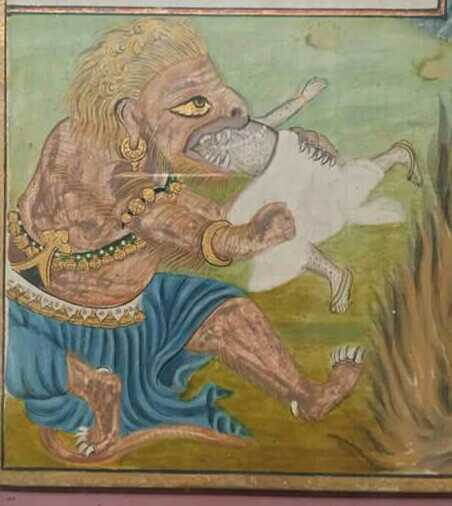
Vritra is trying to eat and kill Indra, who kills him by stabbing him on the chest with the Vajra upon his elephant Airavata.

- Antaboga is the world serpent of traditional Javanese mythology. It is a derivative from the Hindu Shesha combined with Javanese animism.
- Gogaji also known as Jahar Vira Gogga is a folk god, worshiped in the northern states of India. He is a warrior hero of the region, venerated as a saint and a snake god. He is worshiped as a warrior god amongst Hindus.
- Ketu is the severed body of an asura called Svarbhānu, that swallows the moon causing lunar eclipses. He is depicted in art as a serpent with no head riding a chariot drawn by eight black horses.
- Nagnechiya Mata (Nagnechia Maa, Nagnechia Madha), a snake goddess, is the kuladevi of the Rathore clan, a Suryavanshi Rajput clan of India, as well as Brahmabhatas (who are also Vaitalika Kaumudika Brahmins),
- Patanjali is a snake footed rishi (sage) who is an incarnation of Shesha.
- Rahu is the severed head of an asura called Svarbhānu, that swallows the sun causing solar eclipses. He is depicted in art as a serpent with no body riding a chariot drawn by eight black horses.
- Vritra (Ahi) is a serpent (dragon), the demon of drought and the adversary of Indra killed along with his killed younger brother Vala by his Vajra upon his elephant mount Airavata.

==== Nāgas ====
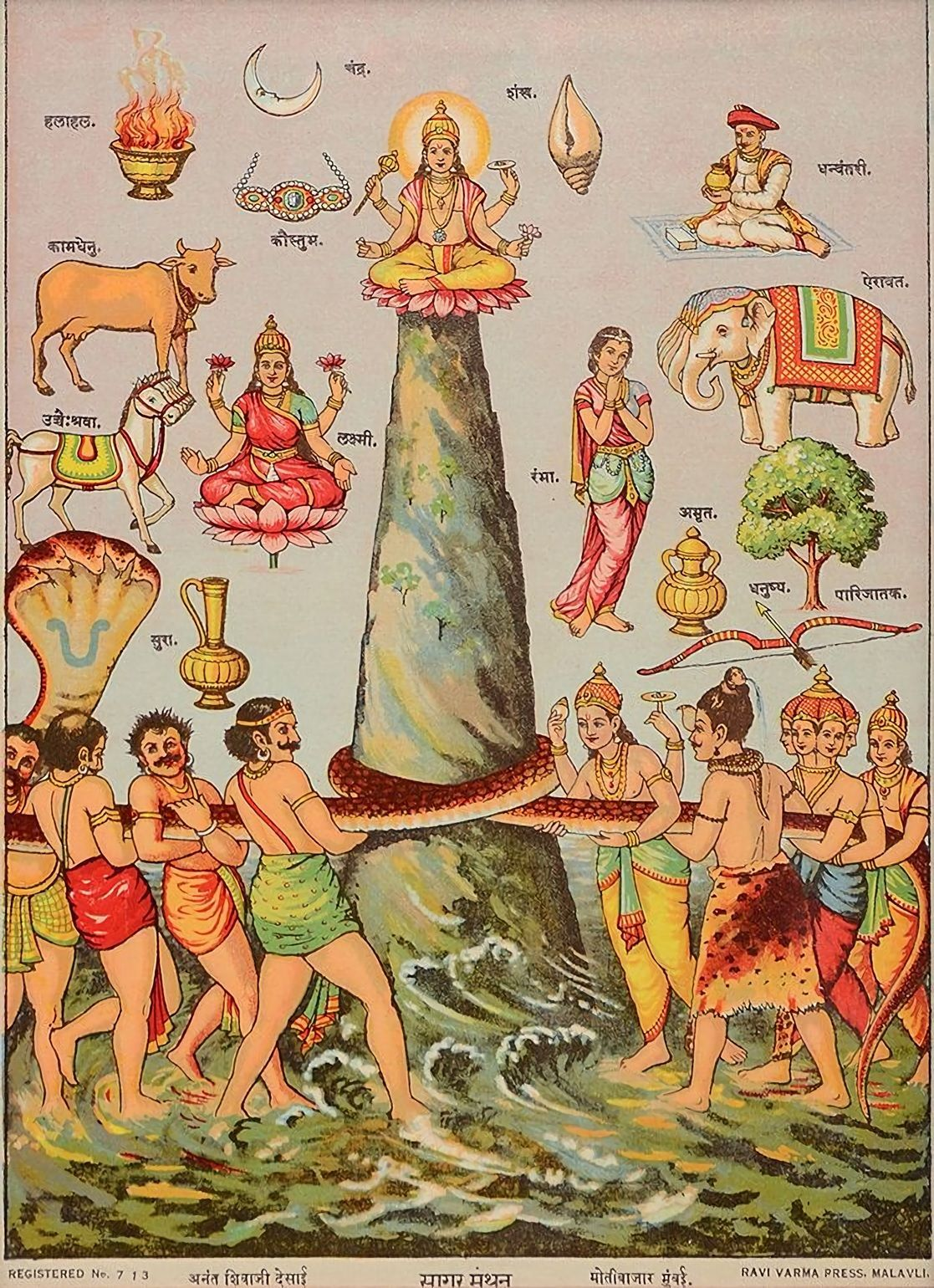
Vasuki in the Samudra Manthana.

- The Naga is an entity or a being, taking the form of a very great snake — specifically the king cobra. A female nāga is a nāgī or nāgiṇī. Notable nagas:
  - Astika is half-Brahmin and half-Nāga, the son of Manasa and Jaratkaru.
  - Kaliya, a snake tamed by Krishna.
  - Karkotaka controls the universal weather.
  - Manasā, also Manasa Devi, is a Hindu folk goddess of snakes, the sister of Vasuki and his siblings and wife of sage Jagatkāru (Jaratkāru) and the mother of Astika.
  - Paravataksha, he for whom his sword causes earthquakes and his roar causes thunder.
  - Surasa is a Hindu goddess, who is the mother of the Uragas (serpents who are actually snakes).
  - Susna is a horned serpent-demon who aids the Asuras in their war against the Devas. The serpent also guards the essence of Amrita in its stomach. Susna is also associated with drought and he got defeated and the Amrita went to the Devas who killed the Asuras and he was kept by the Nagas.
  - Shesha is the Nāgaraja or the king of all the nāgas in the world. The snake on whom Vishnu is in yoga nidra (Ananta Sayana).
  - Takshaka is mentioned as a king of the Nagas.
  - Ulupi, the wife of Arjuna in the epic Mahabharata.
  - Vasuki is a Nāgaraja, one of the kings of the serpents, who coils over Shiva's neck.

==== Pannaga ====
A race related to the Nagas and Uragas, born of Kadru, sister of Surasa.

==== Uraga ====
A race related to the Nagas and Pannagas, born of Surasa, sister of Kadru.

=== Pakshin ===
- Byangoma (feminine Byangomi) are legendary birds of Bengali mythology, appearing most notably in the fairytales of Thakurmar Jhuli, where they are portrayed as wise, fortune-telling birds that help the deserving.
- Gandabherunda (also known as the Bherunda) is a two-headed mythological bird of Hindu beliefs thought to possess magical strength.
- Homa Pakshi (a Vedic bird). It lays eggs while flying in the sky and then the egg will fall. As it is falling, a bird will hatch from the egg. The hatchling then learns how to fly without touching the earth.

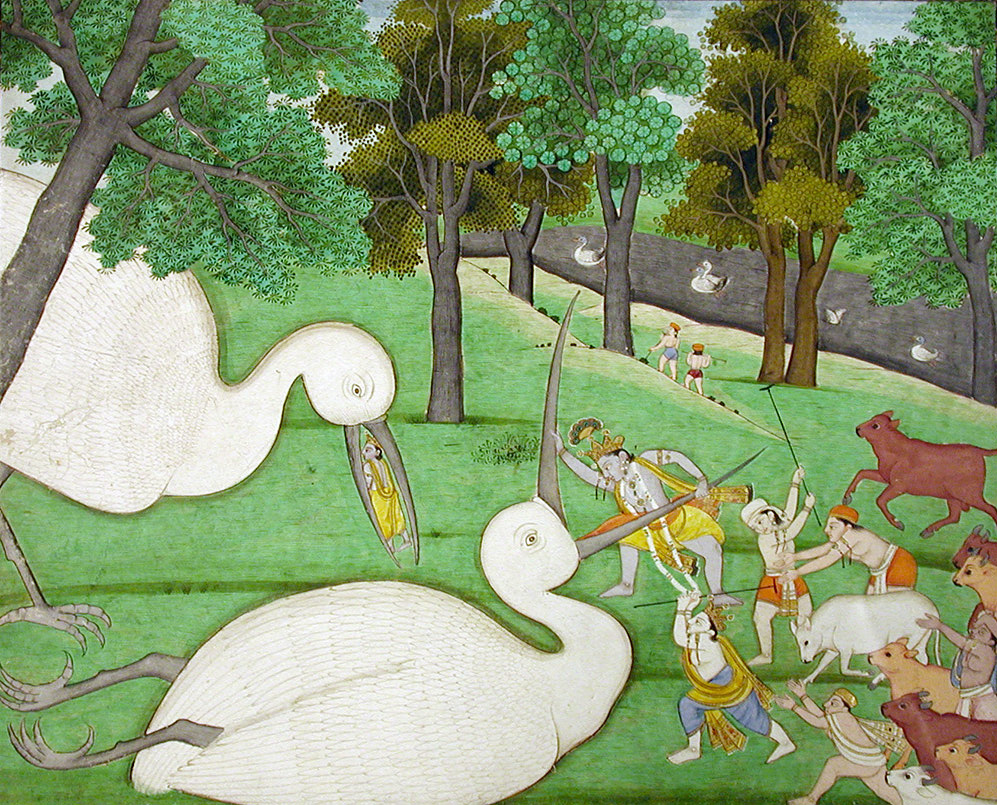
The death of Bakasura the crane (6124594523), who was killed by Vishnu as Krishna in Gokula near Mathura

==== Baka ====
- Bagala - A crane-headed god in Hindu legend, Bagala controls black magic, poisons and disguised forms of death.
- Krauncha - A crane mentioned in the Ramayana.
- Nadijangha - The name of a crane, who was liked by Brahma very much. His story was told by Bhishma to Yudhishtira.

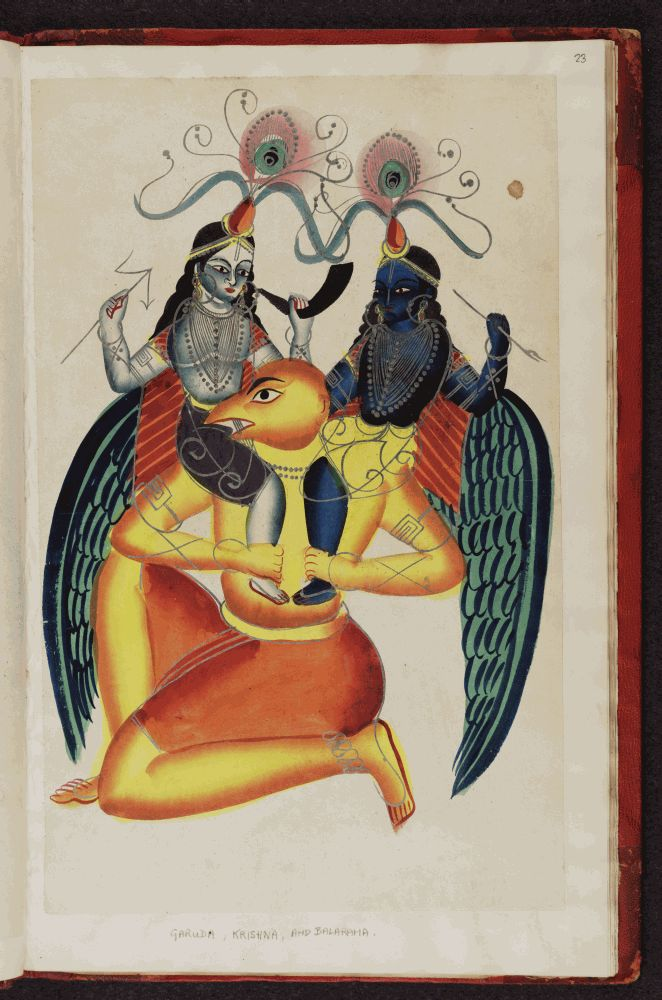
Garuda (Vishnu's principle eagle bird mount) with Krishna and Balarama.

Gṛdha

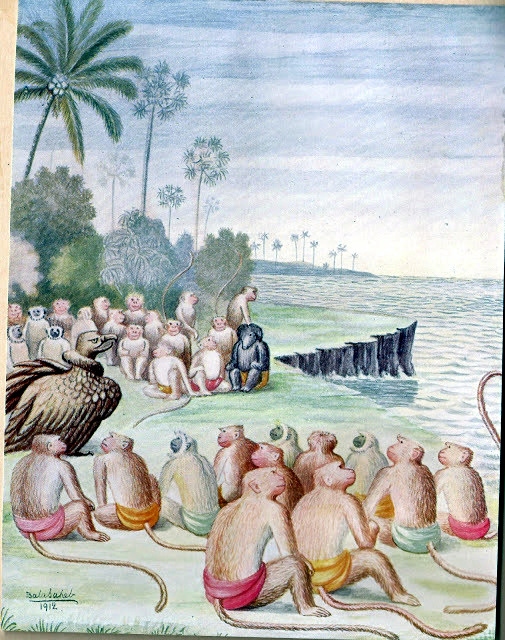
Sampati found by the Vanaras

- Vultures who were the sons of Aruna, brother of Garuda.
  - Sampati, the King of Vultures, was the oldest son of Aruṇa and a brother of Jatayu.
  - Jatayu is the youngest son of Aruna, brother of Sampati.

==== Haṁsa ====
- The hamsa (Sanskrit: हंस, haṃsa or hansa) is an aquatic bird of passage, which is a swan. Its icon is used in Indian culture and Southeast Asian culture as a spiritual symbol and as a decorative element. Hamsa is a part of the mythical love story of Nala and Damayanti. The hamsa is the vahana of Brahma & Saraswati.
  - Arayannas, or heavenly hamsad (swans), are said to live in Lake Manasarovar in the Himalayas.

==== Kāka ====
- Chanda, a crow, is the father of Bhusunda and his twenty brothers (Bhusunda and his brothers were born from the union of Chanda and the seven swans of the Goddess Brahmi).
- Kaagapujandar or Kakabhushundi is a very old sage, in the form of a crow. In the Story of Bhusunda, a chapter of the Yoga Vasishtha, Bhusunda recalls a succession of epochs in the earth's history, as described in Hindu cosmology. He survived several destructions, living on a wish-fulfilling tree on Mount Meru.

==== Kukkuṭaśāva ====
- Krichi is the rooster of Kartikeya, depicted on his war flag, the Cock flag.

==== Mayura ====
Saraswati with Citramekhala

- Citramekhala is the peacock of Saraswati, the goddess of learning and wisdom.
- Paravani is the peacock vahana of Kartikeya, the god of war and victory.

==== Sarngika ====
- Jarita was a certain female bird of the species called Sarngika. She was wife of the saint Mandapala.

==== Shuka ====
- Suka - The parrot vahana of Kamadeva
- Shuka - The parrot of Kalki

==== Shyena ====
- Shyena (Sanskrit: श्येन ) is the divine hawk identified with Agni, who ascends to heaven for bringing soma (nectar) to earth with the intention of rejuvenating and revitalizing of all things that exist on earth.

==== Suparna ====
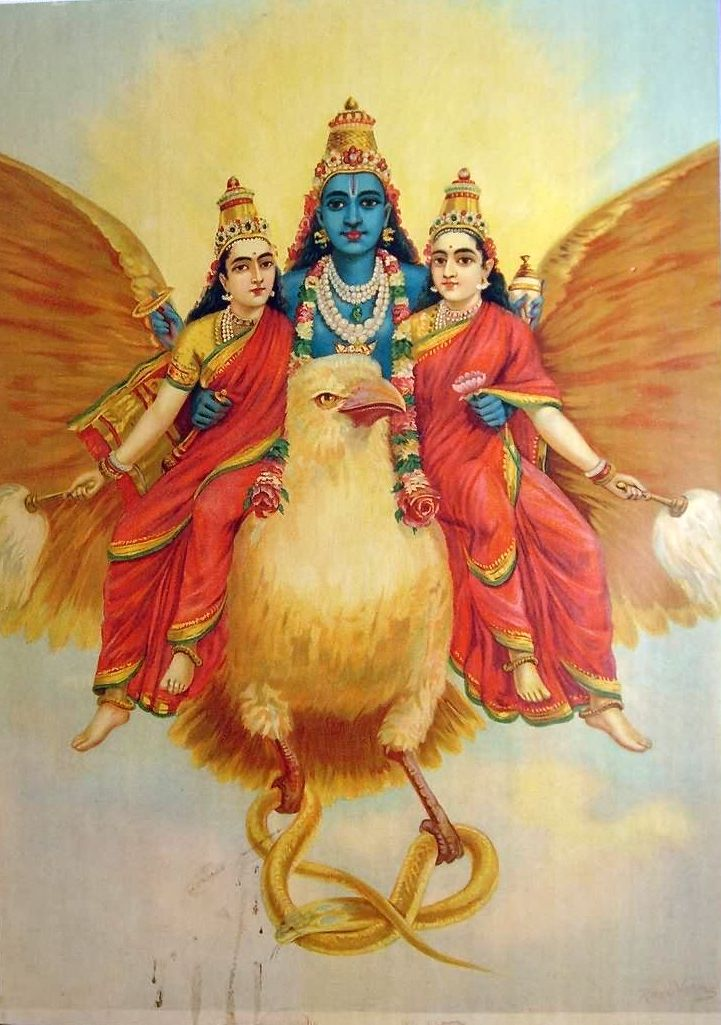
Raja Ravi Varma, Lord Garuda

The Garuda is a large bird-like creature, or humanoid bird. Garuda is the mount (vahana) of the Lord Vishnu. According to the Mahabharata, Garuda had six sons from whom were descended the race of birds.

- Sumukha
- Suvarna
- Subala
- Sunama
- Sunetra
- Suvarcha

==== Tittiri ====
- Chakora, a kind of partridge, is a legendary bird described in Hindu faiths. It is believed to reside upon the beams of the moon, that is, the Chandra.
- Kapinjala, a species of wild partridge associated with Indra, and also a form of Indra as this particular bird race.

==== Uluka ====
- Pravirakarna is a Chiranjivi owl who lives in the Himalayas.
- Uluka - The owl of Lakshmi.

=== Mushika ===
- Mushika - the rat mount of Ganesha. Ganesha is very careful about his mount Mushika and also his safety.

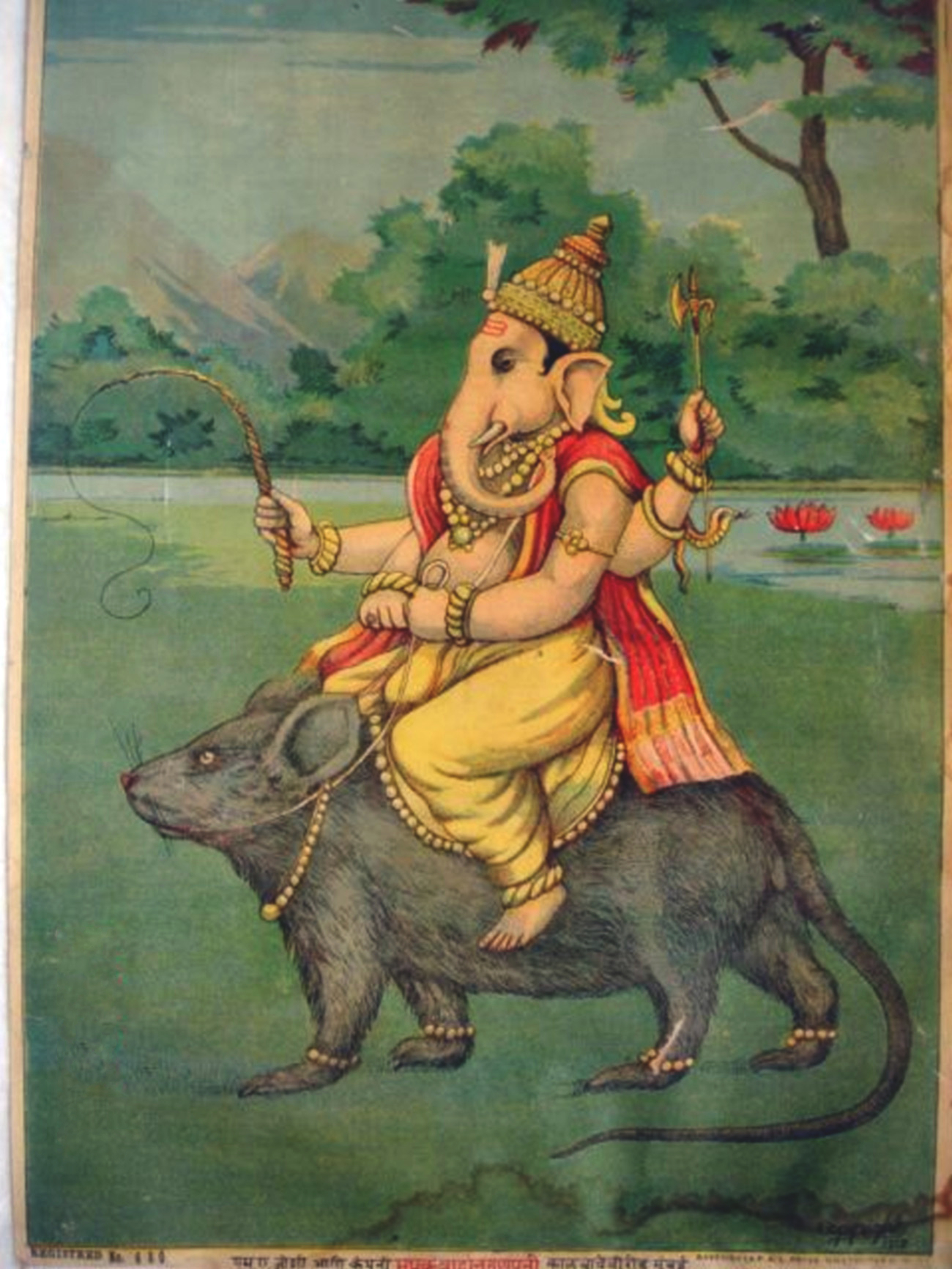
Ganesha on his vahana, a mouse.

=== Gaja or Hastin ===
- Erawan (Thai: เอราวัณ, from Pāḷi Erāvana, or Sanskrit Airāvana) is the Thai version of Airavata. He is depicted as a huge elephant with either three or sometimes thirty-three heads which are often shown with more than two tusks.
- Gajamina, Gadjamina, Gajah Minah, or Eon is an elephant headed mythical figure with the body of a fish used for Patulangan sarcophagi in Bali.
- The Gajasimha is a mythical animal with the body of a lion and the head of an elephant. At Angkor, it is portrayed as a guardian of temples and as a mount for some warriors.
- Gajasura is an elephant demon killed by Shiva, in his Gajasurasamhara form.
- Gajendra the elephant, who was the Pandya king Indradyumna was rescued and had his mortal coil destroyed and liberated by Vishnu from the clutches of Huhu, the crocodile by beheading and liberating him through his Sudarshana Chakra as a Gandharva in the legend of the Gajendra Moksha.
- Ganesha also known as Ganapati and Vinayaka, the elephant headed God.
- Iravati is a daughter of Kadru and Kashyapa. She is the mother of Airavata, the mount of Indra. She is also associated with a sacred river.
- In a tale about Ganesha's birth, the elephant-headed demoness Malini surrogately gives birth to Ganesha after drinking the bathwaters of Parvati, Ganesha's biological mother.
- In Hindu beliefs there were three elephants by the name Supratika. The foremost among them is listed as one of the Diggajas, each representing the eight quarters. The Hindu epic Mahabharata describes two more elephants by the same name – a mythical elephant that was an incarnation of a sage, and the one that belonged to Bhagadatta, the king of Pragjyotisha.
- Vinayaki is an elephant-headed Hindu goddess, a Matrika. The goddess is generally associated with the elephant-headed god of wisdom, Ganesha.

==== Diggajas ====
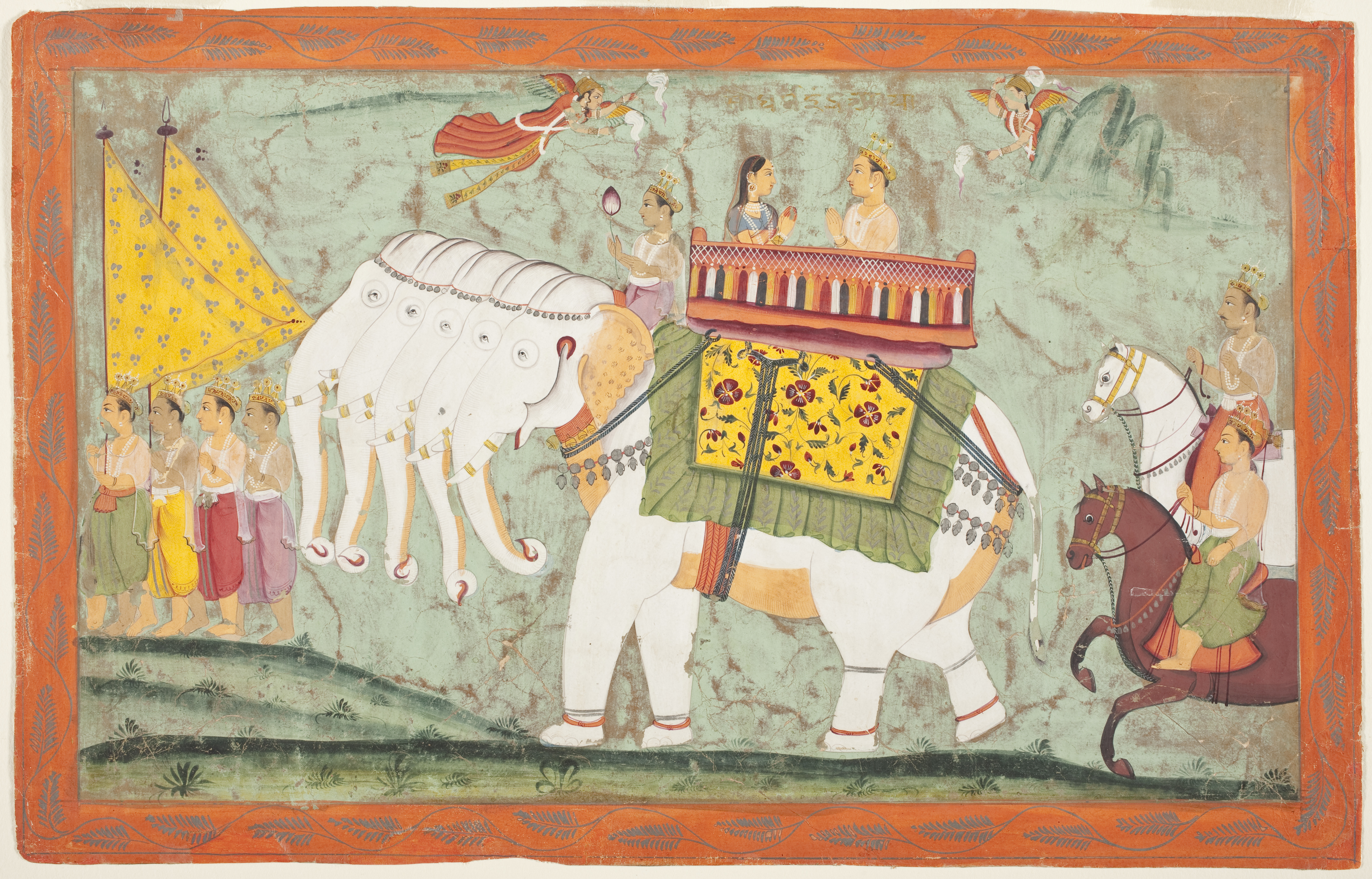
Indra and Shachi on Airavata

- The Amarakosha, a thesaurus of Sanskrit, mentions the names of eight male elephants, and their respective consorts, that bear the world together.
  - Airavata is a mythological white elephant who carries the Hindu God Indra. He also represents the Eastern direction, the quarter of Indra. Abhramu is the consort of Airavata.
  - Pundarika, carries the Hindu god Agni. He represents the Southeast. Kapila is the consort of Pundarika.
  - Vamana and his mate Pingala guard the South with Yama.
  - Kumunda (Southwest) and his mate Anupama, with the god Nirṛti.
  - Anjana and his mate Añjanā guards the West with the god Varuna.
  - Pushpadanta and his mate Subhadanti guards the Northwest with the god Vayu.
  - Sarvabhauma represents the North, the quarter of Kubera. His mate is Tāmrakarna.
  - Supratika represents the Northeast direction, the quarter of Ishana. Anjanavati is believed to be the wife of Supratika.
- Four names are given in the Ramayana 1.41:
  - Virupaksha - East
  - Mahapadma - South
  - Saumanasa - West
  - Bhadra - North

=== Kapi ===
- Kapi is a form of monkey, which is the monkey god Hanuman himself, as may be seen in the lines of the devotional hymn Hanuman Chalisa: "jaya kapīsa tihun loka ujāgara" ("Victory to the Lord who is supreme among the monkeys, The light of the three worlds ...") [Emphasis added.].

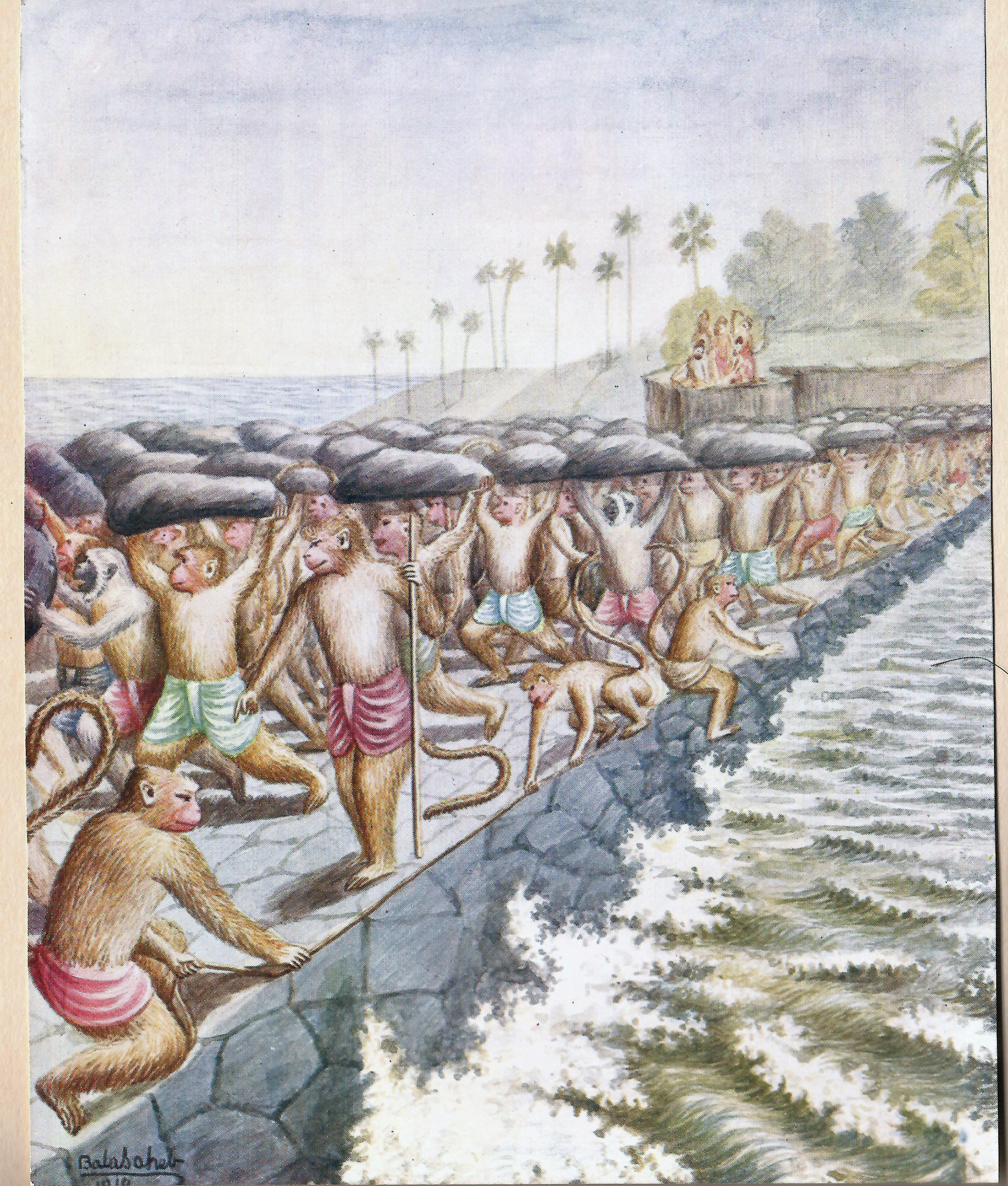
Vanaras Building a Bridge To The Mythical Kingdom Of Lanka

==== Vanara ====
- The Vanaras are the monkey race in the Ramayana. The following are notable Vanaras.
  - Angada, son of Vali, helped Rama find his wife Sita.
  - Anjana, Hanuman's mother.
  - Hanuman is a monkey god and an ardent devotee of the god Rama.
  - Kesari, Hanuman's biological father.
  - Makaradhwaja is the son of Hanuman as per the Valmiki Ramayana.
  - Nala, son of Vishvakarma.
  - Nila, son of Agni.
  - Rumā was the wife of Sugrīva.
  - Sugriva, king of Kishkindha, son of Surya.
  - Tara, wife of Vali.
  - Vali, Sugriva's brother, and a son of Indra.

=== Varāha ===
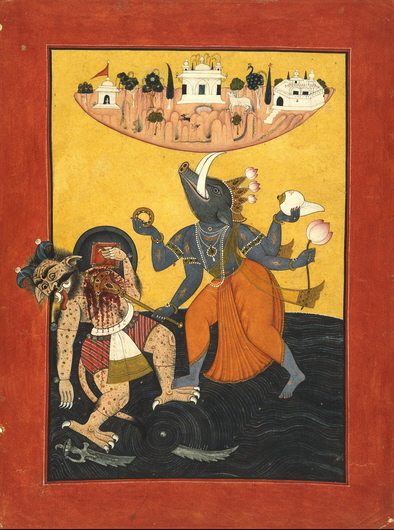
Varaha incarnation of Vishnu kills Hiranyaksha and saves Bhumi.

- Emūsha - In the Brāhmana, a boar which raised up the earth, represented as black and with a hundred arms (probably the germ of the Varaha avatara).
- Varaha is the third avatar of the Hindu god Vishnu in the form of a boar.
- Varahi is one of the Matrikas. With the head of a sow, Varahi is the consort of Varaha.

=== Hariṇa ===
- Pashupati (Sanskrit: Paśupati) is an incarnation of the Hindu god Shiva as "the lord of the animals".
- Rishyasringa was a boy born with the horns of a deer in Hindu-Buddhist faiths, who became a seer.

=== Gō ===
==== Paśu ====
- Ushas are associated with the reddish cows, and are released by Indra from the Vala cave at the beginning of time after killing Vala and his elder brother Vritra.
- Vrishabha - A cow-headed Yogini, who is considered to be the mother of Ganesha.

==== Kamadhenu ====
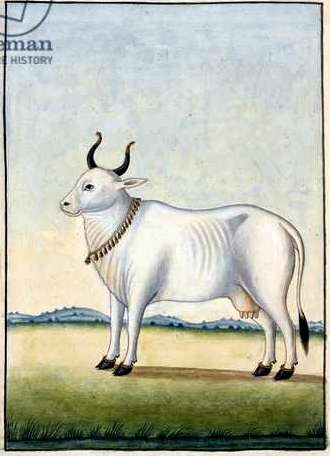
Kamadhenu, the cow of plenty

- Kamadhenu also known as Surabhi, is a bovine-goddess described in Hinduism as the mother of all cows. She is a miraculous "cow of plenty" who provides her owner whatever he desires and is often portrayed as the mother of other cattle as well as the eleven Rudras with Brahma in the Matsya Purana. The following are the offspring of Kamadhenu.
  - Kapila cows (the golden cows), are the children of Kamadhenu, who were also called the mothers of the world (according to the Anushasana Parva, the thirteenth book of the Mahabharata).
  - Manoratha, a calf, created by Krishna and Radha (along with its mother, Kamadhenu and father, Kashyapa) from the left sides of his and her bodies (according to the Devi Bhagavata Purana).
  - Nandini (sometimes referred to as Sabala), the cow of Vashistha, the daughter of Indra's cow Kamadhenu.
  - Rohini, daughter of Surabhi, who is said to be the mother of cows and bulls (according to the Ramayana).
  - Sushila, a daughter of Kamadhenu in the Brahmanda Purana.
  - Yogishvari, a cow, the daughter of Kamadhenu (according to the Matsya Purana).

==== Dikpalis ====
The four guardian cow goddesses of the heavenly quarters (they are the 4 daughters of Kamadhenu according to the Udyoga Parva, fifth book of the Mahabharata):

1. Dhenu in the north
2. Harhsika in the south
3. Saurabhi in the east
4. Subhadra in the west

==== Vṛṣabha ====
- Bir Kuar or Birkuar, also known as Birnath, is a Hindu cattle-god worshipped by the herder-class of Ahirs of western Bihar in India. He is considered to be a form of the god, Krishna.
- Nandi, or Nandikeshvara is the name for the bull which serves as the mount of the god Shiva with his wife Suyaprakasha being Parvati's mount and as the gatekeeper of Shiva and Parvati.

==== Mahiṣa ====
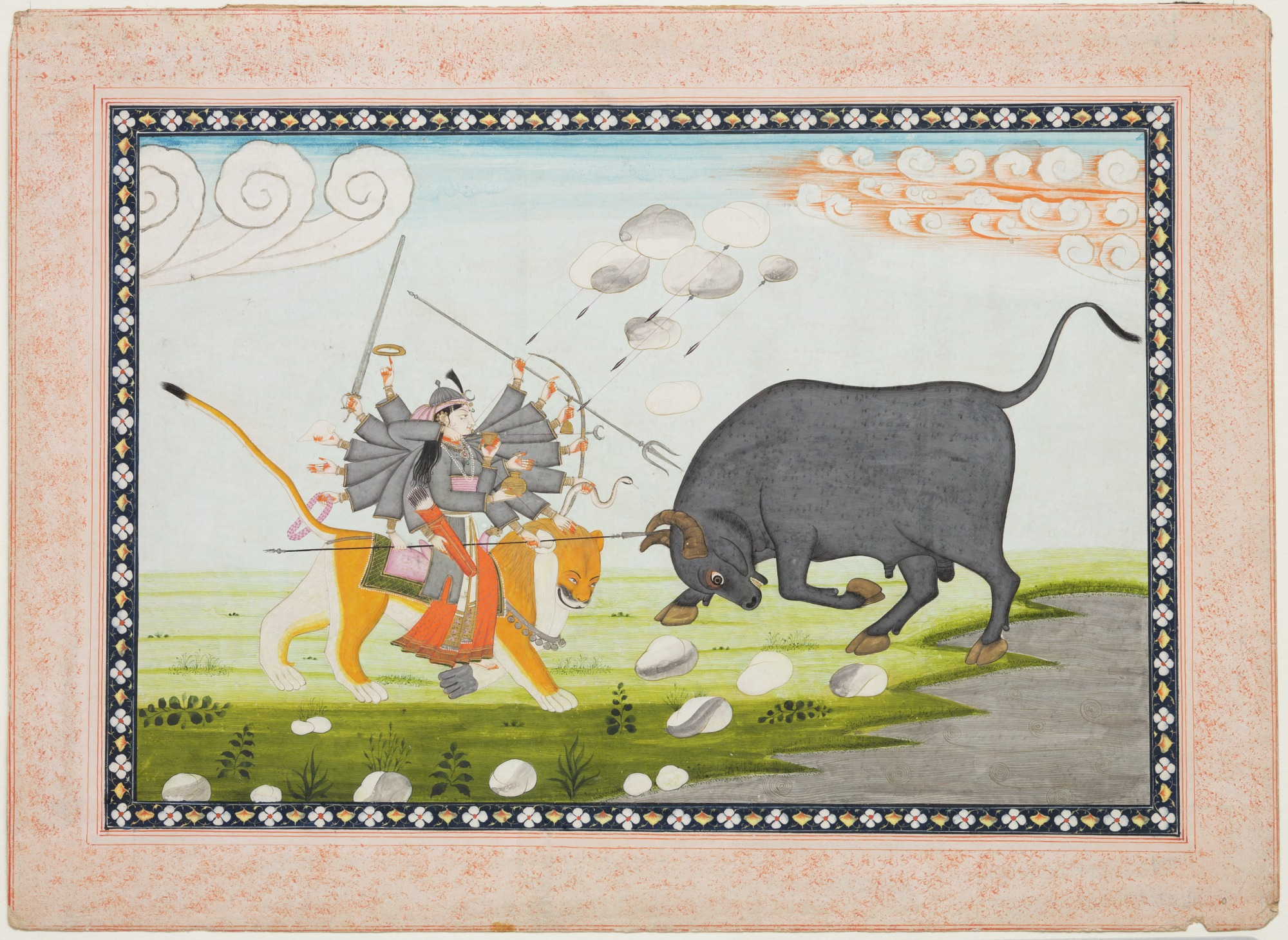
Unknown (Indian) - Durga in Combat with the Bull, Mahishasura before killing him by slicing his head from his body as Mahishasuramardini.

- Mahishasura; According to Hindu beliefs, Mahishasura was a combination of both an Asura and a mahisha ("water buffalo"), being with a trident and killed by Parvati as Korravai.
- Mahishi - The sister of Mahishasura. After the death of Mahishasura, Mahishi continued the war against Devas and was killed by Ayyappa.
- Mhasoba, is a horned buffalo deity of pastoral tribes in Western and Southern India.
- Paundraka is the name of the buffalo of Yama.

=== Aja ===
- Aja - A "he-goat" sacred to Pushan. He holds a prominent position in death rites; he shows the path to the dead.
- Ajaikapala - A boy, whom was begotten by the grace of Shankara (Shiva). He had one foot of a man and the other of a goat. He overcame death as a child and is known as 'Mrityunjaya'.
- Daksha had his actual head once temporarily replaced by a ritually sacrificed and completely devoured goat's discarded head after a temporary beheading punishment by Shiva as Virabhadra and Parvati as Bhadrakali for making Parvati's incarnation as his daughter with Asikini named Sati's suicide possible by humiliating her husband Shiva for being an ascetic destroyer god of the entire universe in the destroyed and completed Daksha yajna and got his actual head reunited with his body after that temporary goat head was decayed upon his apologisement to them for the insulting controversies.
- Naigamesha also known as Harinegameshi, is a goat-headed or deer-headed deity (associated with the war-god Kartikeya).
- Pūṣan - a Vedic divine guardian of flocks and herds of people.

=== Ashva ===
- The Ashvins, in Hindu belief, are two Vedic gods, divine twin horsemen in the Rigveda, sons of Sanjna, a goddess of the clouds in her form as Saranyu and wife of Surya in his form as Vivasvan. They are represented as humans with the heads of horses.
- Badavā - 'A mare, the submarine fire.' In belief, it is a flame with the head of a horse, called also Haya-siras.
- Dadhikrā is the name of a divine stallion who also took the form of a divine falcon (a flying bird of prey), god of the morning Sun.
- Devadatta - The white horse of Kalki, who is mortal incarnation as a horse of Garuda.
- Gandharvi, daughter of Kamadhenu and Kashyapa, and is the mother of horses (according to the Ramayana).
- Farasi Bahari - These are magical green Water Horses that live at the bottom of the Indian Ocean. They are depicted as a horse in its forepart, with a coiling, scaly, fish-like hindquarter.
- Hayagriva, also spelt Hayashirsha, is a white stallion incarnation of the Vishnu in Hinduism as his ninth incarnation of the Dashavatara.
- Keshi is the horse-demon killed by Vishnu as Krishna the eighth incarnation.
- Kinnaras are in the Hindu faith, are paradigmatic lovers, celestial musicians, half-humans and half-horses.
- Tārkṣya is the name of a mythical being in the Rigveda, described as a horse with the epithet áriṣṭanemi "with intact wheel-rims".
- Tumburu is a horse faced Ghandarva, a celestial musician.
- Uchchaihshravas is a seven-headed flying horse, that was obtained during the churning of the milk ocean. Uchchaihshravas is often described as a vahana ("vehicle") of Indra - the king of the gods in heaven, but is also recorded to be the horse of Mahabali, the king of demons in underworld.
- White horse (mythology) are nothing but divine white horses that appear many times in the Hindu faith as the chariot pullers and single ships of the lands of all the deities in Hinduism.

=== Khaḍgin ===
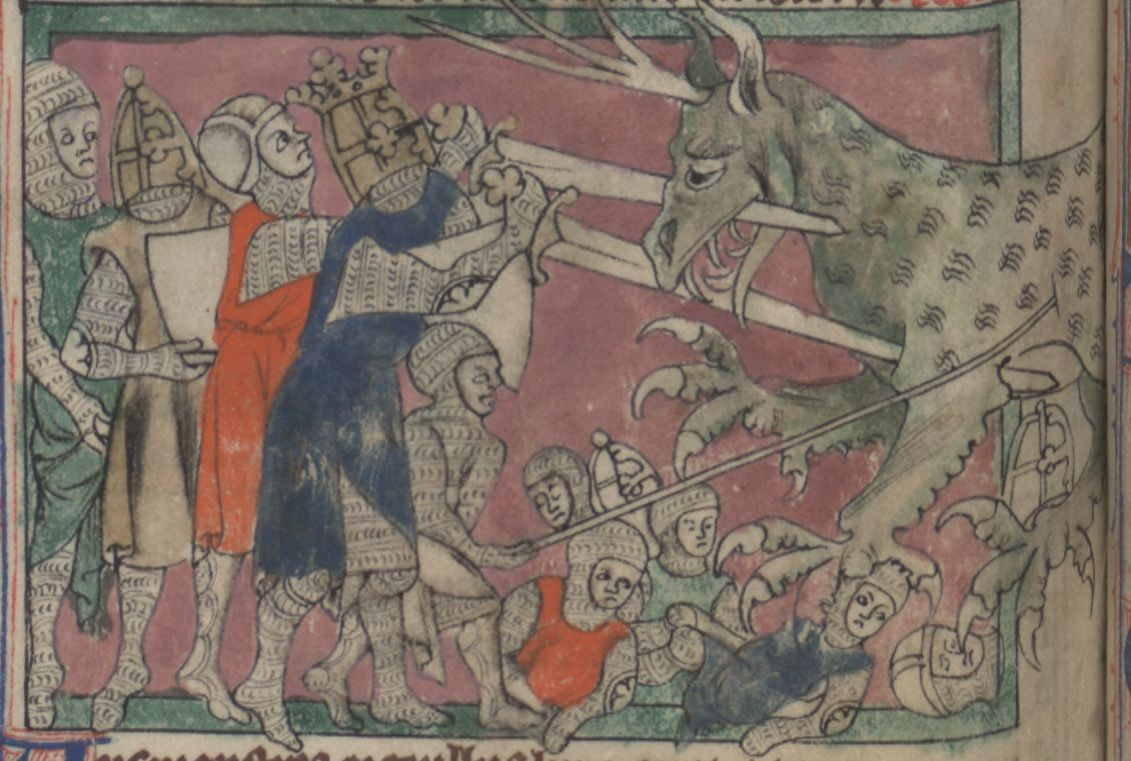
Macedonians are attacked by Odontotyrannos in India

- The Karkadann (from kargadan, Persian: كرگدن "Lord of the Desert") was a mythical creature said to live on the grassy plains of India and Persia. The word kargadan also means rhinoceros in Persian and Arabic.
- Odontotyrannos ("tooth-tyrant") is a three horned beast said to have attacked Alexander the Great and his men at their campaigns in India. It had a black, horse-like head, with three horns protruding from its forehead, and exceeded the size of an elephant.
- The unicorn is a legendary creature that has been described since antiquity as a beast with a large, pointed, spiraling horn projecting from its forehead. The unicorn, which was actually a domesticated bull (male cattle) depicted sidewise with one horn visible frontwards and one horn hidden backwards, was depicted in ancient seals of the Indus Valley Civilization and was mentioned by the ancient Greeks in accounts of Natural history by various writers, including Ctesias, Strabo, Pliny the Younger, and Aelian. The Bible also describes an animal, the re'em, which some versions translate as unicorn.

=== Shvan ===
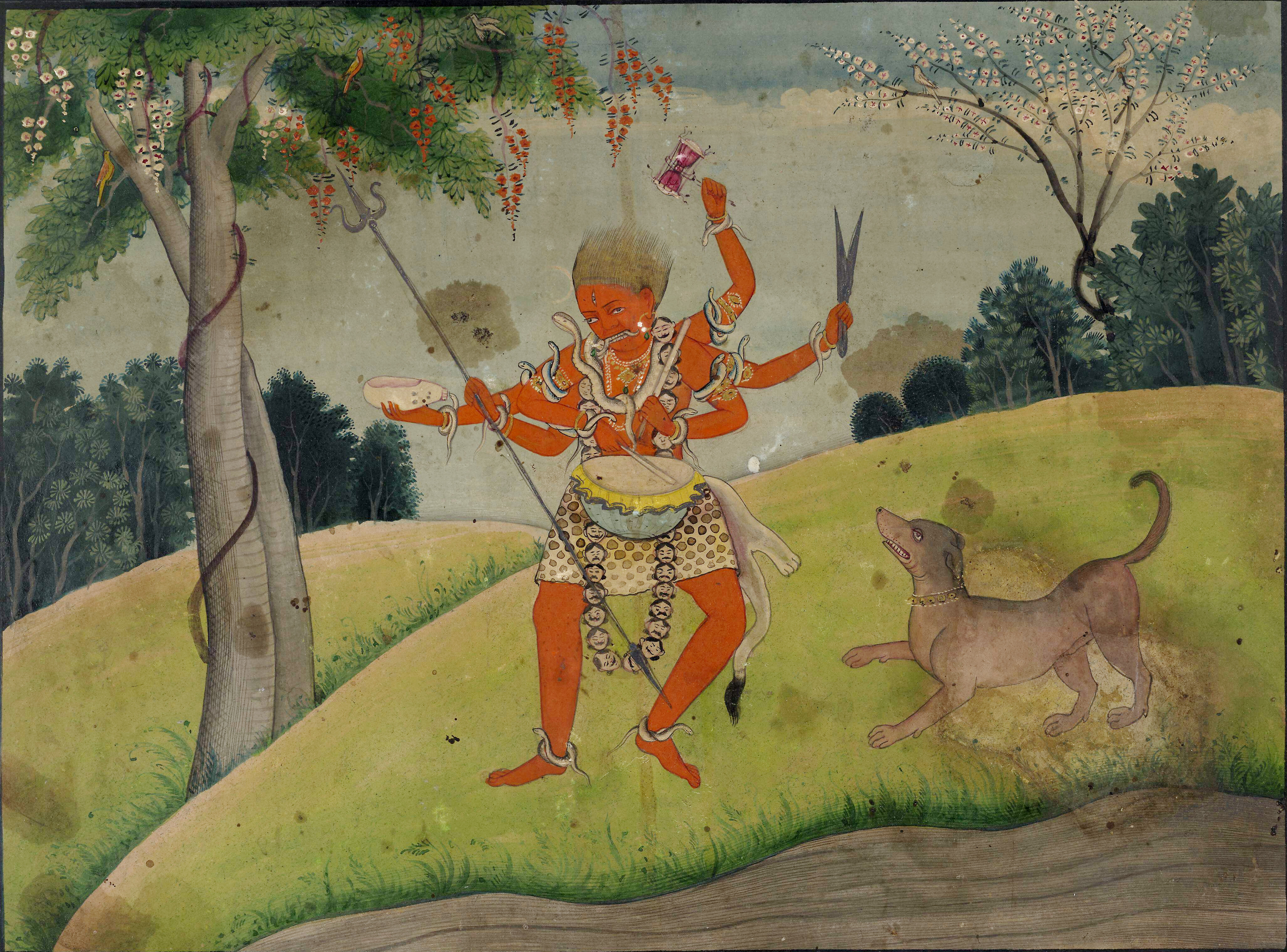
Rakta Bhairava with his dog

- Ruru - a dog; one of the Bhairavas, a manifestation of Shiva.
- In Hindu faith, Sarama is a mythological being referred to as the dog of the gods, or Deva-shuni.
- Sarameya (literally, "sons of Sarama") are the children of Sarama, whose names are Shyama and Sabala.
- Sharvara and Shyama are the two ancient Hindu mythical dogs belonging to Yama.
- Sisara is the husband of Sarama, father of the Sarameya.

=== Mahabidala ===
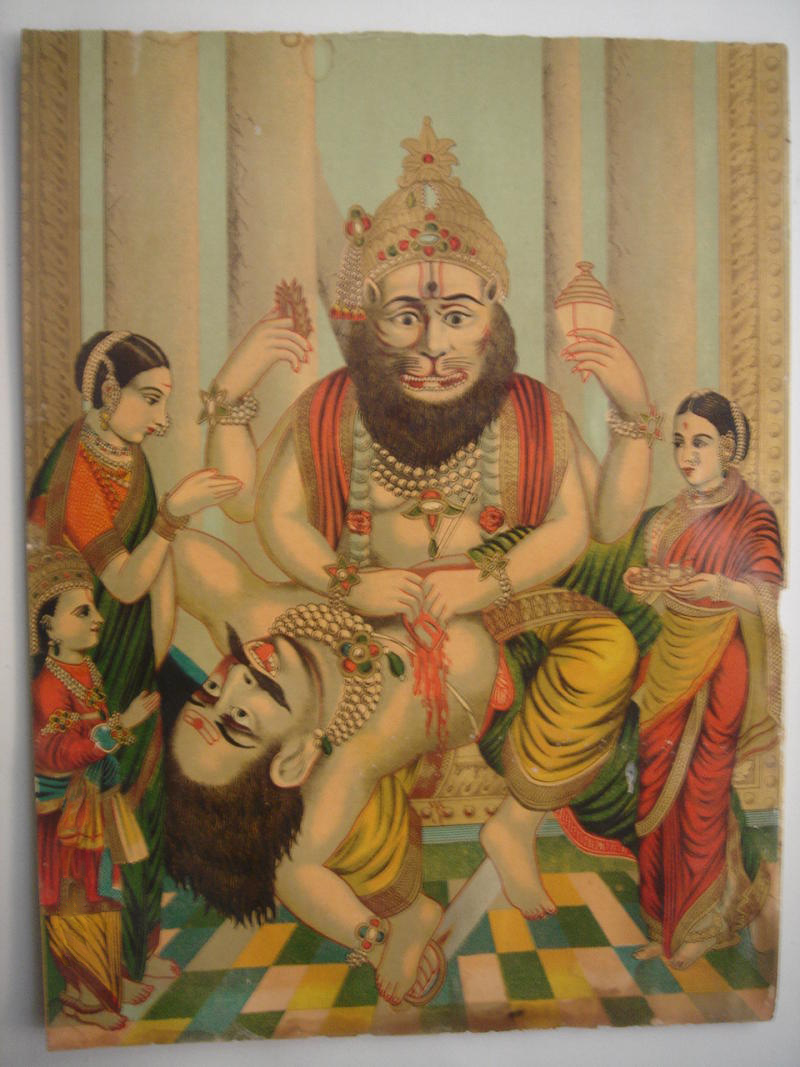
Vishnu's half-man half-lion avatar, Narasimha disimboweling Hiranyakashipu in front of Kayadhu and Prahlada in their palace's doorstep.

- Budhi Pallien is a fearsome goddess of forests and jungles, who roams northern India, particularly Assam, in the form of a tiger.
- Kimpurusha were described to be lion-headed beings.
- Narasiṃha is an incarnation of the Hindu god Vishnu, and is often visualised as having a human torso and lower body, with a lion face and claws as the one who killed Hiranyakashipu and saved Prahlada with his mother Kayadhu.
- Dawon is a sacred lion, it was offered by gods to serve goddess Durga, a form of goddess Parvati as mount for rewarding her victory.
- Narasimhi (Sanskrit: नारसिंहीं, Nārasiṃhī), power of Narasimha (lion-man form of Vishnu), is a woman-lion goddess and throws the stars into disarray by shaking her lion mane.
- Manasthala is the lion mount of Parvati Durga who was known as the demon Simhamukha killed by Skanda in his previous life.
- Pratyangira or sometimes called Simhamukhi Lakshmi, Narasimhi or Narashimhika, is a Hindu goddess being with a lioness's face and a human's body as a form of Lakshmi.
- Simhamukha is a lion-faced demon, brother of Surapadma who later was killed and conquered into the lion mount of Parvati as Durga due to his bravery in fighting and getting killed by the Hindu god of war, Kartikeya.
- Vyaghrapada was the one whom being that is the one having the feet like a tiger, was one of the mythical rishis (great sages) of ancient India.

=== Bidala ===
- Mārjāra - The cat vahana of Shashthi, a Hindu folk goddess (Shashthi is associated with the war god Kartikeya).

=== Bhallūka ===
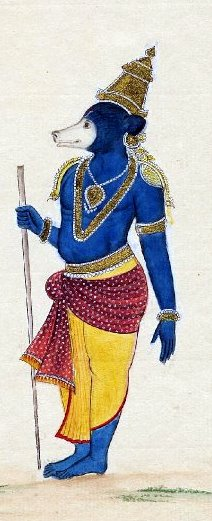
Jambavan

The Rikṣā are first described as something like Vanaras (monkeys) but in later sections of Ramayana, Rikṣā are revealed as bears. Notable Rikṣās are as follows:

- Jambavan (or Jambavanta) is a character originating in Indian epic poetry. The King of the Bears, he is an sloth bear in Indian epic tradition.
- Jambavati is the daughter of Jambavan, King of the Bears, and the third wife of Vishnu as Krishna.

=== Yuyukkhura ===
- The Crocotta (or corocotta, crocuta, or leucrocotta), is a mythical dog-wolf of India or Ethiopia, linked to the hyena and said to be a deadly enemy of men and dogs.

=== Therianthropes ===
- Ichchhadhari Nagas are a race of mythical shape-shifting cobras in Indian folklore.
- Ailuranthropes (werecats), the weretiger. In India, the weretiger is often a dangerous sorcerer, portrayed as a menace to livestock, who might at any time turn to man-eating. These tales travelled through the rest of India and into Persia through travellers who encountered the royal Bengal tigers of India and then further west.
- Hemaraja - The Hemaraja is a creature found in Thai and possibly South Asian(Indian) faith. It is said to be the combination of a hem (an ill-defined creature in and of itself; usually likened to a swan but sometimes depicted more like a crocodilian as a crocodile) and a lion.
- Makara is a sea-creature in Hindu faith. Makara is the vahana (vehicle) of Ganga - the goddess of the river Ganga and the sea god Varuna and the river goddess of Narmada named as Narmada. It is also the insignia of the love god Kamadeva.

In the epic Ramayana, the Makara is responsible for the birth of Hanuman's son, Makaradhwaja.

- Navagunjara is a creature composed of nine different animals. The beast is considered a form of the Hindu god Vishnu, or of Krishna, who is considered an avatara (incarnation) of Vishnu.
- Panchamukhi Hanuman Hanuman assumed the Panchamukhi or five-faced form to kill Ahiravana. He assumes a vanara's head, a lion's head, an eagle's head, a boar's head and a horse's head.
- Reachisey is a mythical animal, with the head of a lion, a short elephantine trunk, and the scaly body of a dragon. It occurs at Angkor Wat in the epic bas reliefs of the outer gallery.
- Rompo is a mythological beast with the head of a hare, the ears of a human, a mane, a slender body, the front arms of a badger, and the rear legs of a bear. It feeds only on human corpses and it is said to croon softly as it eats.
- Vaikuntha Chaturmurti or Vaikuntha Vishnu is a four-headed aspect of the Hindu god Vishnu, mostly found in Kashmir (northern part of the Indian subcontinent). He has a human head, a lion head, a boar head and a fierce sage head.
- Yali also known as Vyala or Vidala in Sanskrit) is a mythical creature seen in many Hindu temples, often sculpted onto the pillars. It may be portrayed as part-lion, part-elephant and part-horse, and in similar shapes.
- Sharabha is a part-lion and part-bird beast in Hindu mythology, who, according to Sanskrit literature, is eight-legged and more powerful than a lion or an elephant, possessing the ability to clear a valley in one jump.

== Gods, Demons and Spirits ==
=== Abhutarajas ===
- A class of 10 gods of the Raivata Manvantara, the 5th Manu age. It is also called Abhutarayas.

=== Adyas ===
- One of the 5 classes of gods in the 6th Manvantara, of which Cakshusha was the Manu.

=== Angirises ===
- The Angirises (or Angiras) are a group of celestial beings who are descendants of the fire god Agni and the sacrifice goddess Svaha, and responsible for watching over humans performing Yajna (sacrifices) and protecting the sacrificial fires

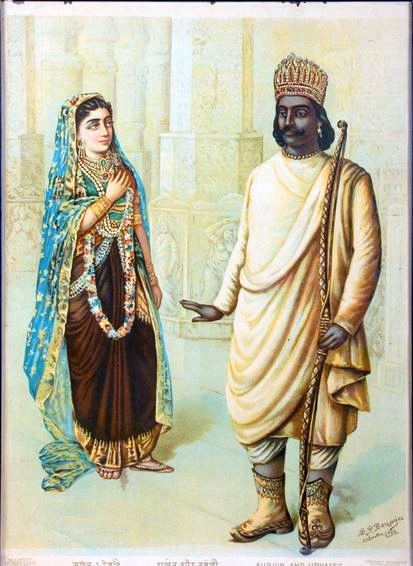
Arjuna and Urvashi

=== Apsara ===
- An Apsara (also spelled as Apsarasa) is a female spirit of the clouds and waters in Hindu and Buddhist mythology. They are often wives of the Gandharvas. Notable apsaras:
  - Menaka
  - Pramlocha
  - Rambha
  - Tara
  - Tilottama
  - Urvashi
  - Satyavati

=== Asura ===
- The Asuras are evil mythological lordly beings in Indian texts who compete for power with the more benevolent gods and get brutally genocided by them.
  - Daityas - In Hinduism, they are a clan and race of Asuras as are the Danavas. Daityas were the children of goddess Diti and the sage Kashyapa. The following are notable Daityas.
    - Hiranyaksha - elder son of Kashyapa and Diti
    - Hiranyakashipu - younger son of Kashyapa and Diti
    - Holika - middle daughter of Kashyapa and Diti
    - Prahlada - son of Hiranyakashipu
    - Virochana - son of Prahlada, father of Mahabali
    - Devamba - mother of Mahabali
    - Mahabali - son of Virochana
    - Banasura - son of Mahabali
  - Danavas - In Hinduism, they were a clan or race of Asuras descending from the goddess Danu and the sage Kashyapa.
    - The Kalakeyas or Kalakanjas were a powerful, ferocious and cruel clan of Danavas.
  - Nivatakavachas
    - The Nivatakavachas are a supernatural race of Asura demons, living deep under the oceans killed by Vishnu as Nara and Indra together as Arjuna told by Indra and Devas, other Devas in the Mahabharata.

=== Bhuta ===
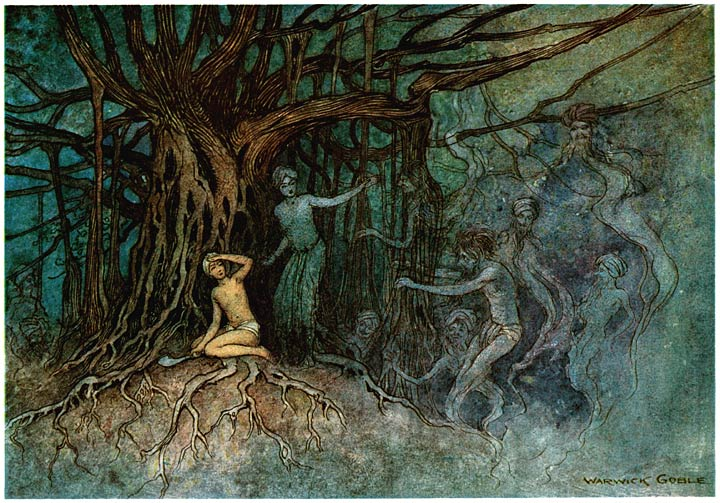
A benevolent Brahmadaitya saving a poor Brahmana man from a group of Bhutas (ghosts)

- Acheri is the ghost or spirit of a little girl who was either murdered or abused and left to die.
- Aleya (or marsh ghost-light) is the name given to an unexplained strange light phenomena occurring over the marshes as observed in Bengal.
- Chir Batti, Chhir Batti or Cheer batti is a ghost light reported in the Banni grasslands, a seasonal marshy wetlands and adjoining desert of the marshy salt flats of the Rann of Kutch.

=== Dakini ===
- The dakini appeared in medieval legends in India (such as in the Bhagavata Purana, Brahma Purana, Markandeya Purana and Kathasaritsagara) as a demoness in the train of Kali who feeds on human flesh. The masculine form is known as Daka.

=== Gana ===
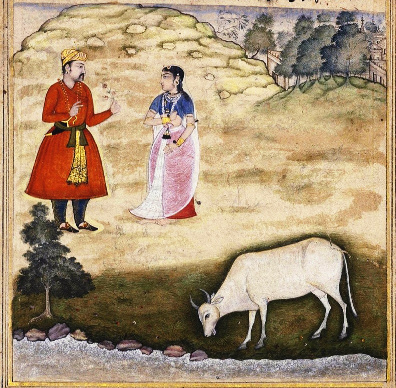
The wife of one of the Vasus is tempted to steal the wish-bearing cow Nandini of Vasishtha

- The Ganas or Gana-Devatas are the troops of deities, attendants of Shiva and his wife Parvati and they also live on Gana-parvata i.e., Kailasha. Ganesha was chosen as their leader by Shiva and Parvati, hence Ganesha's title of gaṇeśa and also gaṇapati, "lord of the ganas and leader of the ganas" was given to him. The nine classes of Ganas are:
  - Adityas.
  - Visvedevas.
  - Vasus.
  - Tushitas (also Ájas).
  - Abhasvaras; The "Shining Ones". A class of deities, 64 in number. They inhabit an ethereal world and preside over spiritual enlightenment.
  - Anilas.
  - Maharajikas; a class of subordinate deities in the order of 220 or 236.
  - Sadhyas; a class of minor Hindu gods who guard the rites and prayers of the greater gods.
  - Rudras.

=== Gandharva ===
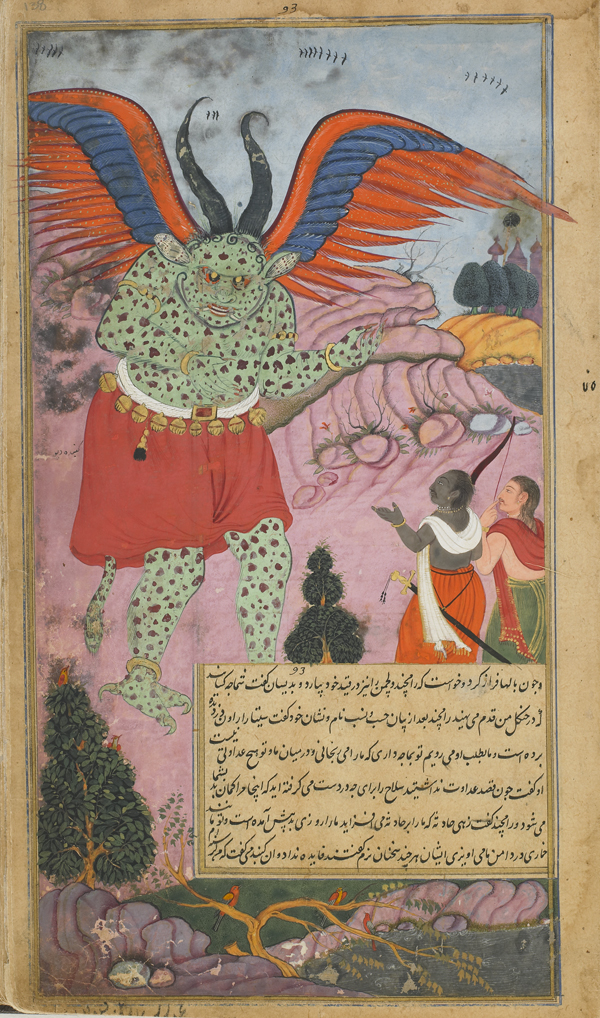
Vishvavasu as Kabandha tells Rama and Lakshmana how he came to have his hideous form as a demon and was also promptedly killed and liberated by them.

- The Gandharvas are male nature spirits, husbands of the Apsaras. Some are part animal, usually a bird or a horse.
  - Chitrasena, a character in the Indian epic Mahabharata, was a Gandharva king who taught song and dance to Indra and Vishnu as Nara's combined incarnation of Arjuna.
  - Kabandha was a Gandharva named Vishvavasu who was also known as Danu, who was cursed and made into an ugly, carnivorous demon by Indra, and was killed and liberated by Rama and Lakshmana.
  - Tumburu, a well-known Gandharva.

=== Guhyaka ===
- Guhyakas (गुह्यक, literally "hidden ones") are a class of supernatural beings in Hindu faith. Like Yakshas (nature-spirits), they are often described as attendants of Kubera.

=== Kimpurusha ===
- Kimpurusha were described to be lion-headed beings.

=== Kindeva ===
- Kindevas are a race of human-like beings mentioned in the Hindu Puranas. They are said to have a human-like appearance, but also deva-like qualities, hence the term kindeva.

=== Kinnara ===
- In Hindu mythology and Buddhist mythology, a kinnara is a paradigmatic lover, a celestial musician, half-human, half-horse and half-bird. The Kinnaris are the female counterparts of the male Kinnaras.

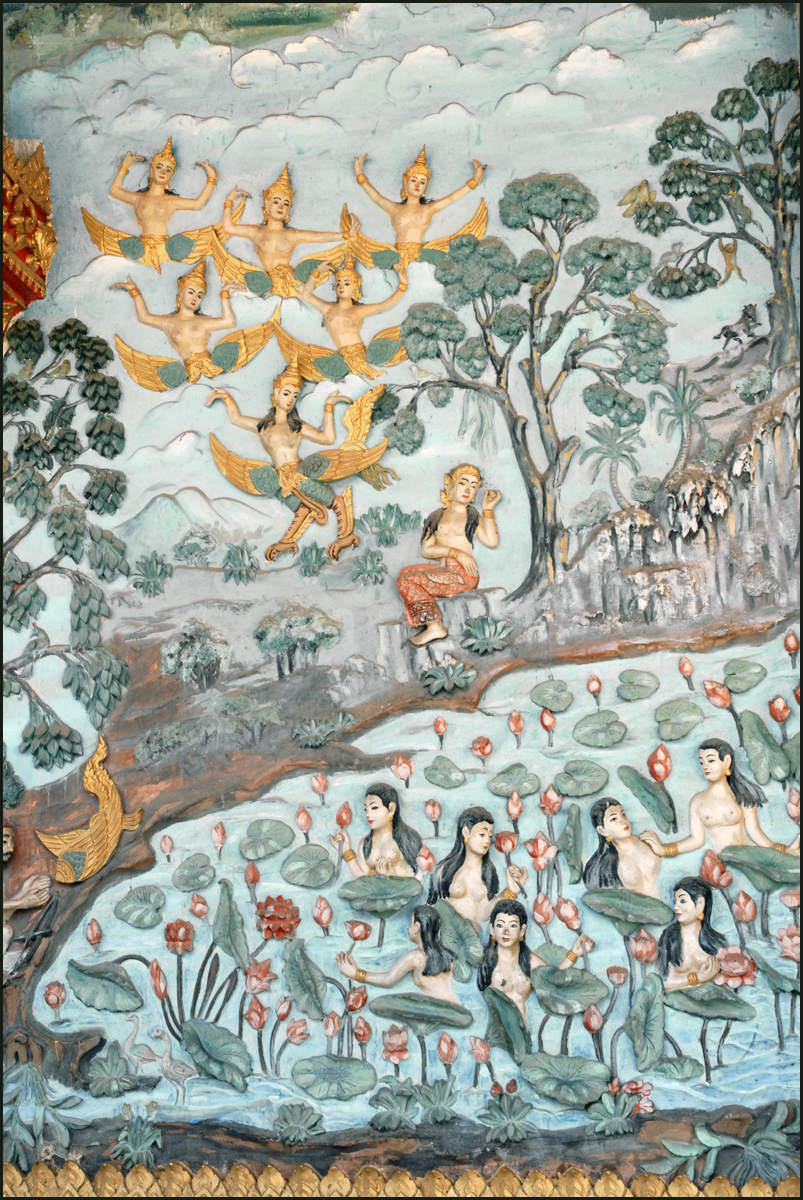
Kinnaras

Kumbhanda

- A Kumbhāṇḍa (Sanskrit) or Kumbhaṇḍa (Pāli) is one of a group of dwarfish, misshapen spirits among the lesser deities of Buddhist mythology.

=== Panis ===
- The Panis are a class of demons in the Rigveda. The Panis appear in RV 10.108 as watchers over stolen cows and bulls.

=== Pishacha ===
- The Pishachas are flesh-eating demons according to Hindu faith.

=== Preta ===
- Preta is the Sanskrit name for a type of supernatural being described in some Indian religions as undergoing suffering greater than that of humans, particularly an extreme level of hunger and thirst.

=== Rakshasa ===
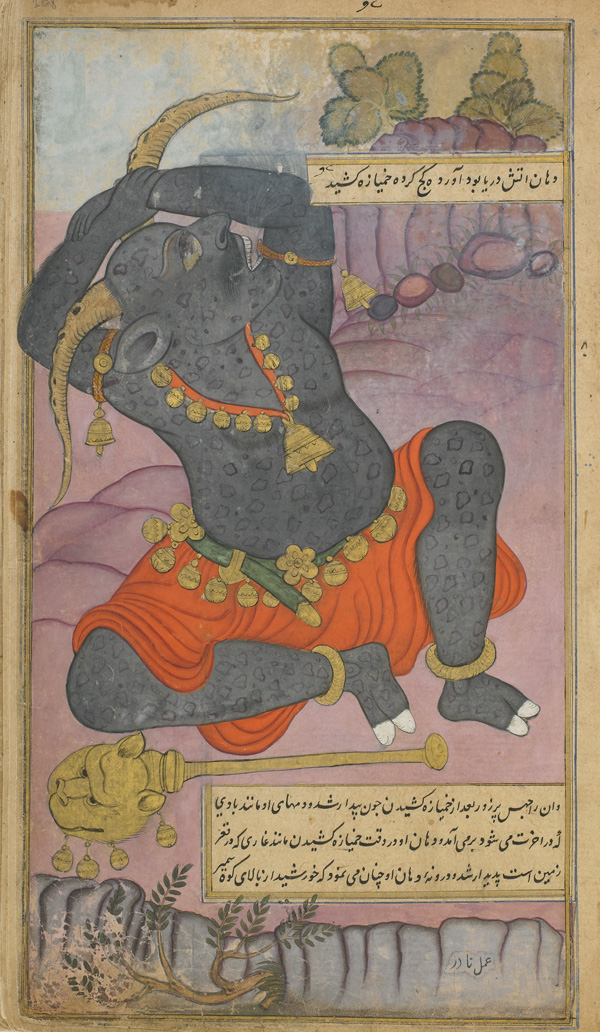
Kumbhakarna yawns as he is roused from sleep and made to eat a mountain of food alone; and then after he, Ravana, their entire family, their entire country, their entire army gets genocided by Rama's army who grab Sita and take Kubera's Pushpaka Vimana to Ayodhya immediately away after coronating Vibhishana

- The rakshasas are demonic beings from Hindu faith. Rakshasas are also called maneaters (Nri-chakshas, Kravyads). A female rakshasa is known as a Rakshasi.
  - Brahmarakshasa are fierce demon spirits in Hindu faith.
  - Krodhavasas are a race of rakshasas in the Mahabharata.
- The following are notable rakshasas:
  - Akshayakumara was the youngest son of Ravana.
  - Atikaya was the son of Ravana and his wife Dhanyamalini in the Ramayana epic.
  - Hidimba is the brother of Hidimbi and a forest dweller.
  - Hidimbi is the wife of Bhima and mother of Ghatotkacha in the Mahābhārata.
  - Indrajit or Meghanada was a prince of Lanka and a conqueror of Indra Loka. He is the son of king Ravana.
  - Kumbhakarna is the third brother of Ravana.
  - Mandodari was the queen consort of Ravana.
  - Maricha is the uncle of Ravana, who aided in the abduction of Sita.
  - Nikumbha is the lord of the Pishachas, son of Kumbhakarna.
  - Prahasta is the chief commander of Ravana's army of Lanka and son of Ravana.
  - Ravana, king of Lanka, brother of Kubera.
  - Shurpanakha is the youngest sister of Ravana, King of Lanka.
  - Subahu, son of Tataka.
  - Tataka, mother of Subahu.
  - Vibhishana is the second brother of Ravana.

=== Vetala ===
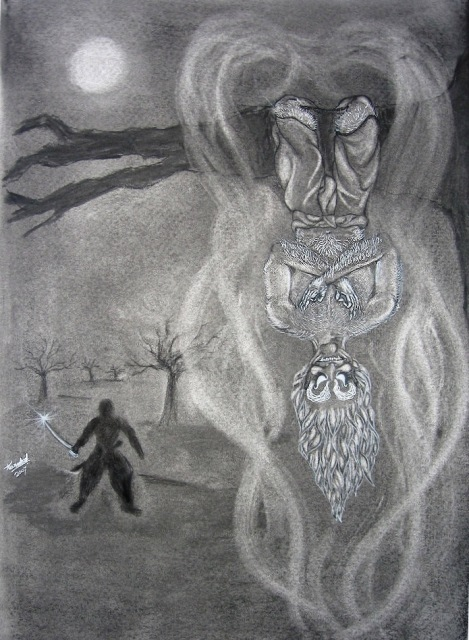
Vetala in crematorium before Vikramaditya

- Chedipe is a witch-vampire in the folklore of the region around the Godavari River in India. They are associated with the devadasis, girls who were dedicated to a Hindu temple god and were often treated as temple prostitutes.
- Churel is a female ghost of South Asian folklore. The word "churel" is also used colloquially for a witch. Women who die in childbirth or pregnancy due to the negligence of her in-laws or relatives are often described turning into churels, who return to seek their vendetta and suck the blood of their male relatives.
- Pichal Peri (Persian: پیچھل‌ پری) or churail (Urdu: چڑیل) (meaning back footed in Urdu language) is an unexplained entity that is a popular topic for ghost stories in Central and South Asia.

=== Vidyadhara ===
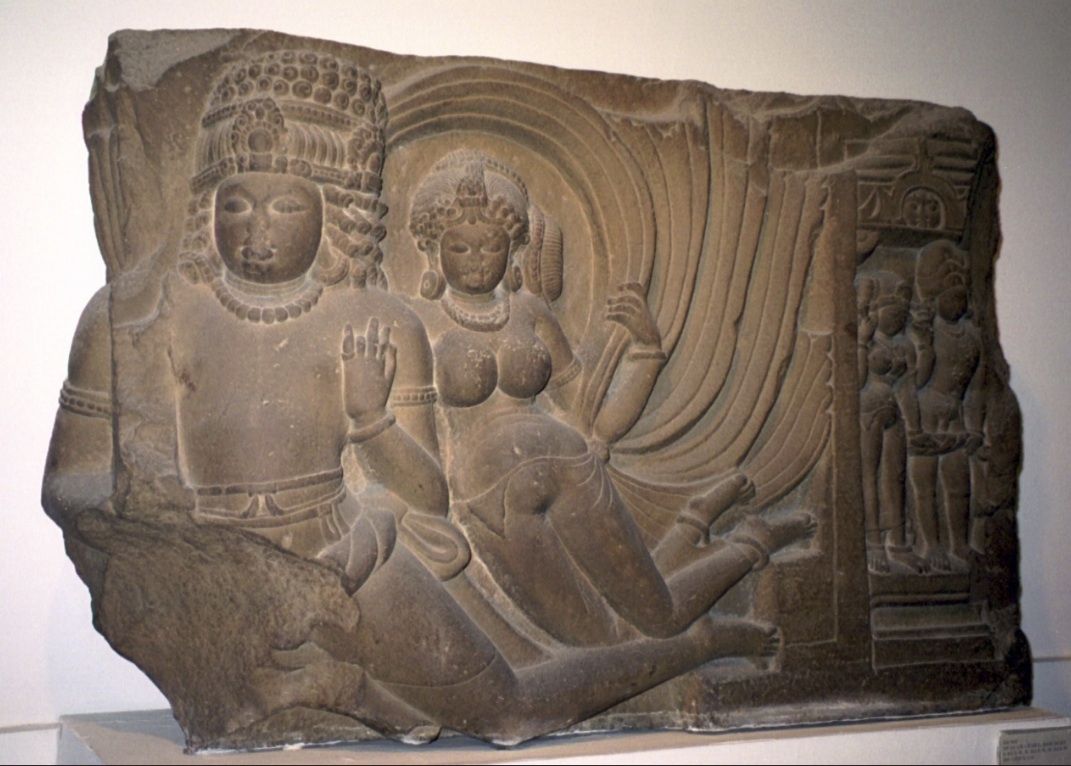
Vidyadhara

- Vidyadhara are a group of supernatural beings in Indian religions who possess magical powers. They are considered as Upadevas, semi- gods, and essentially spirits of the air. A female Vidyadhara is known as a Vidyadhari.

=== Vinayakas ===
- The Vinayakas were a group of four troublesome demons who created obstacles and difficulties in Hindu faith, but who were easily propitiated.

=== Yaksha ===
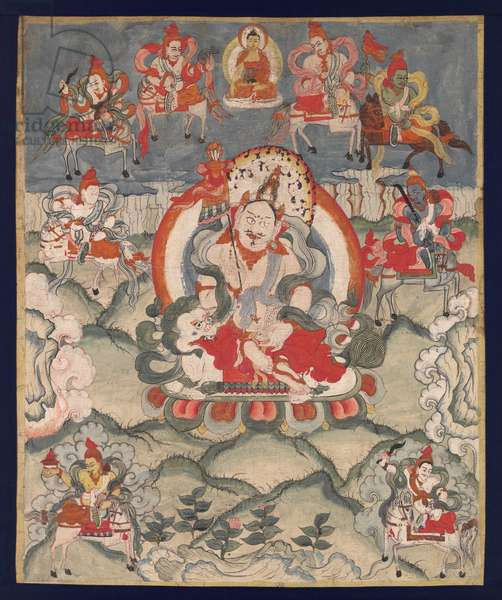
Kubera, Lord of Yakshas

- Yaksha is the name of a broad class of nature-spirits, usually benevolent, who are caretakers of the natural treasures hidden in the earth and tree roots. They appear in Hindu, Jain and Buddhist texts. The feminine form of the word is yakṣī.
  - Kubera, king of the Yakshas.
  - Manibhadra
  - Nalakuvara

=== Yakshini ===
- Yakshini (Yakshi) is the female counterpart of the male Yaksha, and they are attendees of Kubera. Although Yakshinis are usually benevolent, there are also yakshinis with malevolent characteristics in Indian folklore.
  - Kalliyankattu Neeli, a powerful demoness who was finally destroyed by Suryakaladi Nambudiri.
  - Kanjirottu Yakshi (Chiruthevi) is a folkloric vampire. She was born into an affluent Padamangalam Nair tharavad by name Mangalathu at Kanjirakoodu in Southern Tiruvithamkoor (now in Tamil Nadu). She was a ravishingly beautiful courtesan who had an intimate relationship with Raman Thampi, son of King Rama Varma.
  - Tatakā (ताड़का) was a Yaksha princess-turned-demoness in the epic Ramayana killed by Rama.

=== Yogini ===
- In Sanskrit literature, the yoginis have been represented as the attendants or various manifestations of Durga engaged in fighting with the demons Shumbha and Nishumbha, and the principal yoginis are identified with the Matrikas. There are sixty-four or eighty-one Yoginis (Tantric goddesses).

=== Others ===
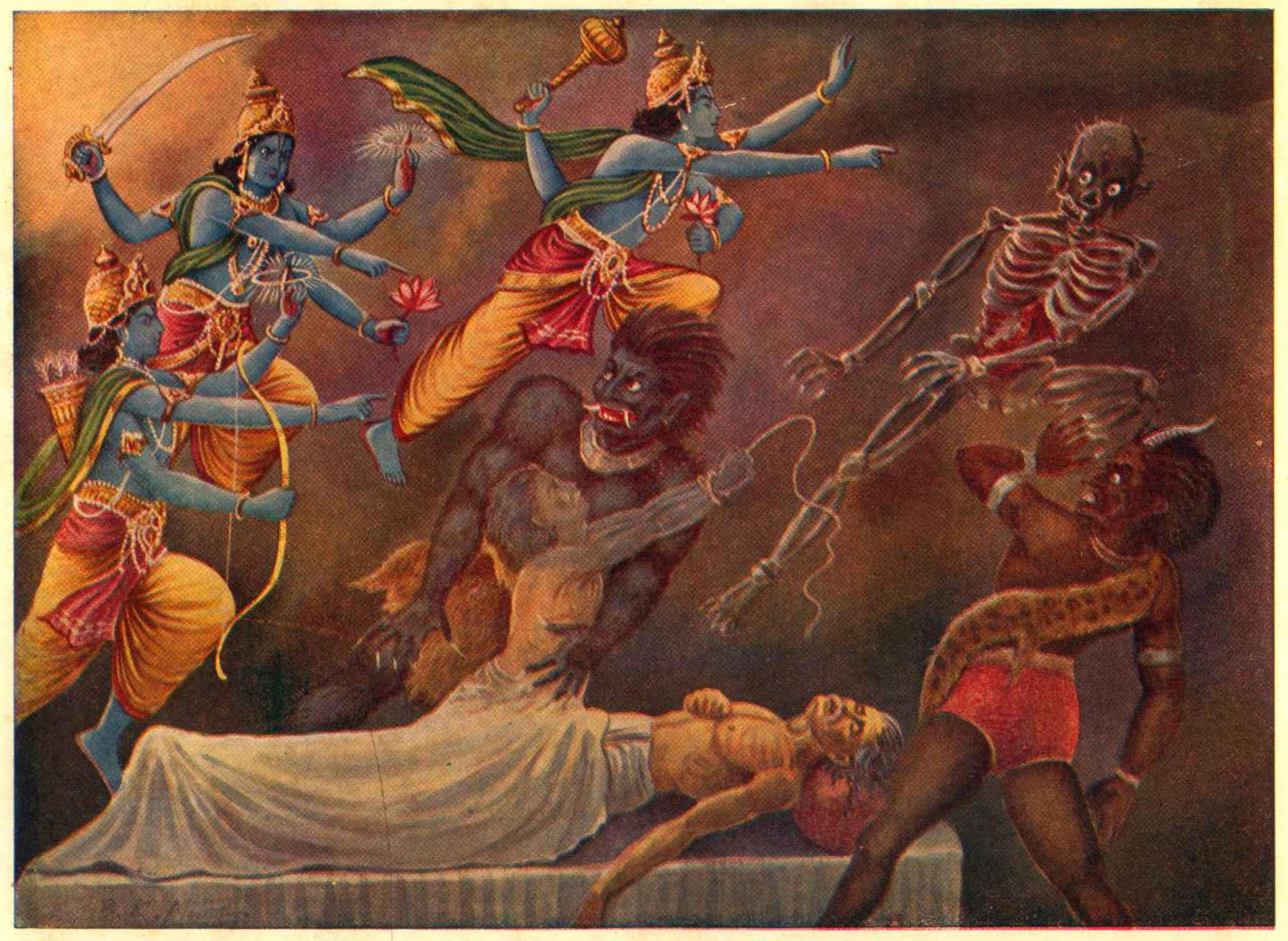
Nama Mahatmya - Vishnudutas rescues Ajamila by defeating, killing and chasing Yamadutas

- Chiranjivi are seven immortal living beings in Hinduism who are to remain alive on Earth until the end of the current Kali Yuga.
- Dvarapalas are door keepers or gate guardians always present as a set of two warriors or two powerful giants in all temples over all deities's shrines's enterances, both always armed with weapons - the most common main weapon of theirs is being the Gada (mace).
- Nairrata are demonic soldiers of Kubera's army, described to have defeated king Muchukunda.
- Vālakhilyas were great sages, 60,000 in number, born of the parents Kratu and Kriyādevī. They were of the size of a thumb.
- Vishnudutas are the messengers of Vishnu.
- Yamadutas are the messengers of Yama.

== Human races ==
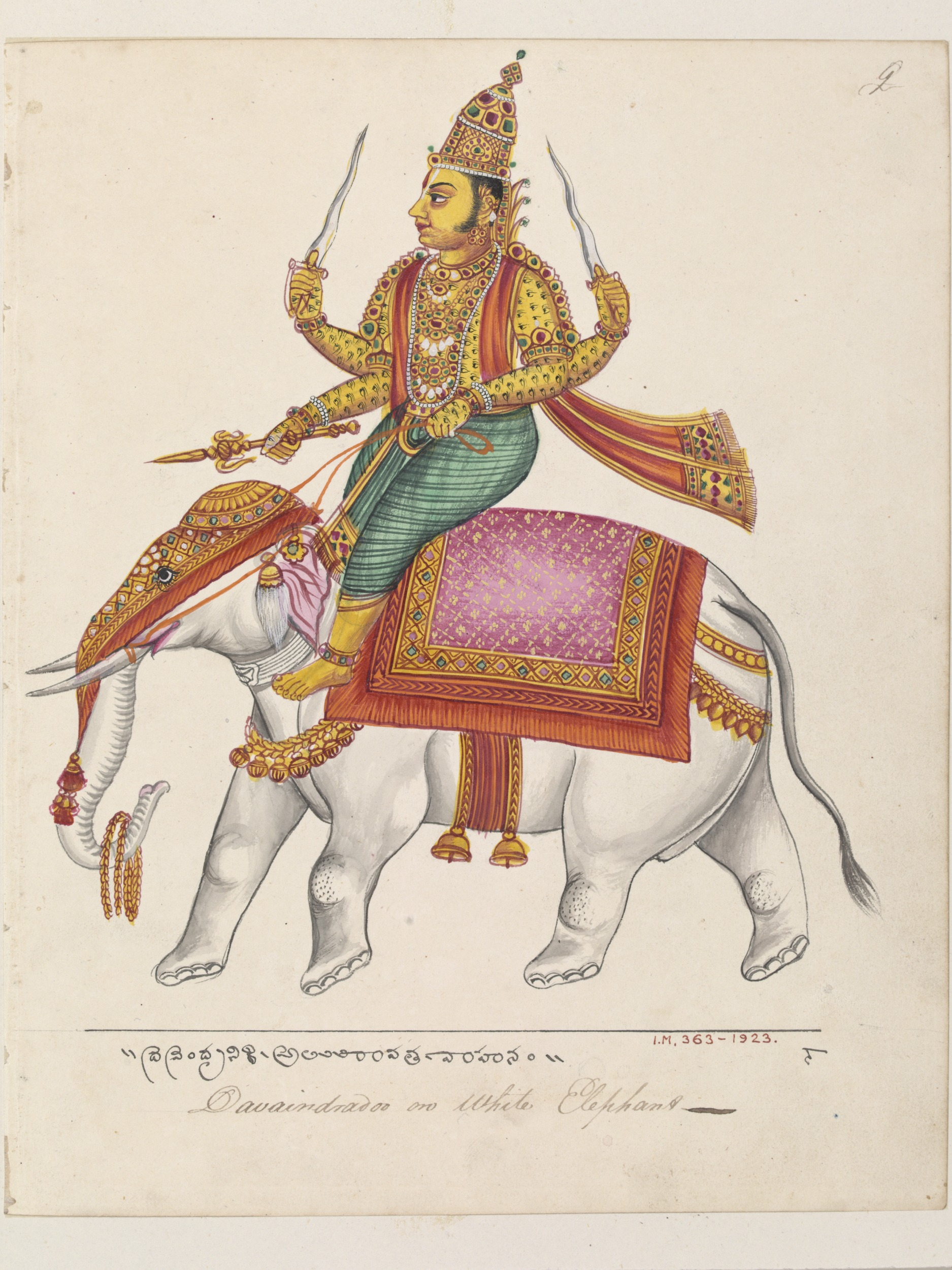
Indra, the king of the Devas

- The Astomi are an ancient legendary race of people who had no need to eat or drink anything at all. They survived by smelling apples and flowers. Megasthenes and Pliny the Elder (quoting Megasthenes) mentioned these people in his Indica. Megasthenes located them at the mouth of the river Ganges.
- The Calingae or Calingi, according to ancient accounts, were a race of extremely short-lived people in India. According to Pliny the Elder, they had a lifespan of only eight years.
- The Deva are a mythical people of Sri Lanka according to the Sanskrit epics. According to the Mahavamsa and Ramayana, they lived among the Naga, Yakkha and Raskha. They ousted their arch enemies the Raskha from Sri Lanka, with the help of Lord Vishnu. They were then subsequently conquered by King Ravana of the Raskha, who was killed by Lord Vishnu as Lord Rama in the Ramayana story and gave Lanka (Sri Lanka) to the Deva people.
- Eka-pāda meaning 'One-footed' is a fabulous race of men spoken of in the puranas.
- The Macrocephali in medieval bestiaries were a race of humanoids with large heads. Some sources indicate that they may have come from India.
- Mandi is a race of people according to Pliny the Elder are a short-lived tribe of people from India.
- Monopods are mythological human creatures with a single, large foot extending from a leg centered in the middle of their bodies. They are described by Pliny the Elder in his Natural History, where he reports travelers' stories from encounters or sightings of Monopods in India. Pliny remarks that they are first mentioned by Ctesias in his book Indica (India).

== Monsters ==
- Ihamrga is the representation of fabulous creatures in Hindu faith.
- Kala is a ferocious monster symbolic of time in its all-devouring aspect and associated with the destructive side of the god Shiva.
- Kirtimukha is the name of a swallowing fierce lion face with huge fangs, and gaping mouth, quite common in the iconography of Indian and Southeast Asian temple architecture.

== See also ==
- List of legendary creatures by type
- List of mythical creatures
