= Buddhist eschatology =

Buddhist eschatology, like many facets of modern Buddhist practice and belief, came into existence during its development in China, and, through the blending of Buddhist cosmological understanding and Daoist eschatological views, created a complex canon of apocalyptic beliefs. These beliefs, although not entirely part of orthodox Buddhism, form an important collection of Chinese Buddhist traditions which bridge the gap between the monastic order and local beliefs of Imperial China.

Although the main source of writings describing eschatological beliefs in Chinese Buddhism are so called "apocryphal" texts, these are an invaluable source of information in the study of Buddhism as it was actually practiced, as the available monastic sources depicting Buddhism are merely the tip of an iceberg, of which the body is still mostly submerged and hidden from view. These eschatological Buddhist groups began to appear in China from AD 402, and escalated in number and intricacy from the Sui until the Song dynasty. Therein is where many lay and cleric groups (of laymen and clergy) such as the White Lotus Society and Amida Buddhist clergy appeared and took to propagating eschatological scriptures.

There are two major points of Buddhist eschatology: the appearance of Maitreya and the Sermon of the Seven Suns.

== Maitreya ==
Buddha described his teachings disappearing five thousand years from his passing, corresponding approximately to the year 4600 CE. At this time, knowledge of dharma will be lost as well. The last of his relics will be gathered in Bodh Gaya and cremated. There will be a new era in which the next Buddha Maitreya will appear, but it will be preceded by the degeneration of human society. This will be a period of greed, lust, poverty, ill will, violence, murder, impiety, physical weakness, sexual depravity and societal collapse, and even the Buddha himself will be forgotten. This will be followed by a new golden age (see below).

The earliest mention of Maitreya is in the Cakavatti (Sihanada) Sutta in Digha Nikaya 26 of the Pali Canon.

At that period, brethren, there will arise in the world an Exalted One named Maitreya, Fully Awakened, abounding in wisdom and goodness, happy, with knowledge of the worlds, unsurpassed as a guide to mortals willing to be led, a teacher for gods and men, an Exalted One, a Buddha, even as I am now. He, by himself, will thoroughly know and see, as it were face to face, this universe, with Its worlds of the spirits, Its Brahmas and Its Maras, and Its world of recluses and Brahmins, of princes and peoples, even as I now, by myself, thoroughly know and see them.

— Digha Nikaya, 26.

Maitreya Buddha is then foretold to be born in the city of Ketumatī in present-day Benares, whose king will be the Cakkavattī Sankha. Sankha will live in the former palace of King Mahāpanadā, but later will give the palace away to become a follower of Maitreya.

In Mahayana Buddhism, Maitreya will attain bodhi in seven days, the minimum period, by virtue of his many lives of preparation. Once Buddha, he will rule over the Ketumati Pure Land, an earthly paradise associated with the Indian city of Varanasi or Benares in Uttar Pradesh. In Mahayana Buddhism, Buddhas preside over a Pure Land (the Buddha Amitabha presides over the Sukhavati Pure Land, more popularly known as the Western Paradise).

At this time he will teach humanity of the ten non-virtuous deeds (killing, stealing, sexual misconduct, lying, divisive speech, abusive speech, idle speech, covetousness, harmful intent and wrong views) and the ten virtuous deeds (the abandonment of: killing, stealing, sexual misconduct, lying, divisive speech, abusive speech, idle speech, covetousness, harmful intent and wrong views). He is described by Conze in Buddhist Scriptures:

The Lord replied, 'Maitreya, the best of men, will then leave the Tuṣita heavens, and go for his last rebirth. As soon as he is born he will walk seven steps forward, and where he puts down his feet a jewel or a lotus will spring up. He will raise his eyes to the ten directions, and will speak these words: "This is my last birth. There will be no rebirth after this one. Never will I come back here, but, all pure, I shall win Nirvana."'

— Buddhist Scriptures by Edward Conze

He currently resides in Tushita, but will come to Jambudvipa as successor to the historic Śākyamuni Buddha. Maitreya will achieve complete enlightenment during his lifetime, and following this reawakening, he will bring back the timeless teaching of dharma to this plane.

== Sermon of the Seven Suns ==
In the Sattasūriya sutta (sermon of the "Seven Suns") in the Aṅguttara Nikāya [AN 7.66] of the Pali Canon, the Buddha describes the ultimate fate of the world in an apocalypse that will be characterized by the consequent appearance of seven suns in the sky, each causing progressive ruin until the Earth is destroyed:

All things are impermanent, all aspects of existence are unstable and non-eternal. Beings will become so weary and disgusted with the constituent things that they will seek emancipation from them more quickly. There will come a season, O monks, when after hundreds of thousands of years, rains will cease. All seedlings, all vegetation, all plants, grasses and trees will dry up and cease to be...There comes another season after a great lapse of time when a second sun will appear. Now all brooks and ponds will dry up, vanish, cease to be.

— Aňguttara-Nikăya, 7.66

The canon goes on to describe the progressive destruction of each sun. A third sun will dry the mighty Ganges and other great rivers. A fourth will cause the great lakes to evaporate, and a fifth will dry the oceans. Finally the final suns will appear:

Again after a vast period of time a sixth sun will appear, and it will bake the Earth even as a pot is baked by a potter. All the mountains will reek and send up clouds of smoke. After another great interval a seventh sun will appear and the Earth will blaze with fire until it becomes one mass of flame. The mountains will be consumed, a spark will be carried on the wind and go to the worlds of God....Thus, monks, all things will burn, perish and exist no more except those who have seen the path.

— Aňguttara-Nikăya, 7.66

The sermon completes with the planet engulfed by a vast inferno.

== Developments ==
Buddhists believe that the historical Buddha Shakyamuni is only the latest in a series of Buddhas that stretches back into the past. The belief in the decline and disappearance of Buddhism in the world has exerted significant influence in the development of Buddhism since the time of the Buddha. In Vajrayana Buddhism and various other forms of esoteric Buddhism, the use of tantra is justified by the degenerate state of the present world. The East Asian belief in the decline of the Dharma (called mappo in Japanese) was instrumental in the emergence of Pure Land Buddhism. Within the Theravada tradition, debate over whether Nirvana was still attainable in the present age helped prompt the creation of the Dhammayutt Order in Thailand.

In China, Buddhist eschatology was strengthened by the Daoist influence: the messianic features of Maitreya are widely emphasized. The figure of Prince Moonlight 月光童子 obtains prominence unknown in the Sanskrit sources. Thus, one of the Tang dynasty apocrypha predicts his rebirth in the female form, thus creating religious legitimacy for the Wu Zetian Empress's usurpation. Furthering the Daoist associations, the "Sutra of Samantabhadra" portrays Prince Moonlight dwelling on the Penglai Island in a cave.

Buddhism believes in cycles in which life span of human beings changes according to human nature. In Cakkavati sutta the Buddha explained the relationship between life span of human being and behaviour. As per this sutta, In the past unskillful behavior was unknown among the human race. As a result, people lived for an immensely long time—80,000 years—endowed with great beauty, wealth, pleasure, and strength. Over the course of time, though, they began behaving in various unskillful ways. This caused the human life span gradually to shorten, to the point where it now stands at 100 years, with human beauty, wealth, pleasure, and strength decreasing proportionately. In the future, as morality continues to degenerate, human life will continue to shorten to the point where the normal life span is 10 years, with people reaching sexual maturity at five.

Ultimately, conditions will deteriorate to the point of a "sword-interval", in which swords appear in the hands of all human beings, and they hunt one another like game. A few people, however, will take shelter in the wilderness to escape the carnage, and when the slaughter is over, they will come out of hiding and resolve to take up a life of skillful and virtuous action again. With the recovery of virtue, the human life span will gradually increase again until it reaches 80,000 years, with people attaining sexual maturity at 500. According to the Pali Canon, it is at the zenith of this new golden age that Maitreya will appear (DN 26:25).

According to Tibetan Buddhist literature, the first Buddha lived 1,000,000 years and was 100 cubits tall, while the 28th Buddha, Siddhartha Gautama (563–483 BCE), lived 80 years and his height was 20 cubits. This is on par with the Hindu eschatology, which says this age is the 28th Kali Yuga.

In other traditions, such as Zen, a somewhat utilitarian view is taken. The notion often exists that within each moment in time, both birth and death are manifest. As the individual "dies" from moment to moment, they are equally "reborn" in each successive moment, in what one perceives as an ongoing cycle. Thus the practitioner's focus is shifted from considerations regarding an imagined future endpoint, to mindfulness in the present moment. In this case, the worldview is taken as a functional tool for awakening the practitioner to reality as it exists, right now.

== Causes of the end of true dharma ==
Due to the notion of the three stages of Dharma as taught by the Sakyamuni Buddha, eschatological thought is inherent to Buddhism in that non-permanence affects the sangha and Dharma teachings, just as it affects all other facets of the visible world. What differentiates eschatological groups from orthodox clergy, however, is the belief that the period of the decline of the Dharma has already begun, and that the end of Dharma is close at hand. These teachings, often propagated by self-appointed messianic figures, run counter to the state approved Buddhist teachings, as they often criticize or deplore the "current" state of affairs both within the government and the people. There are of course many sources for this eschatological belief, and throughout the history of Buddhism in China, there have been various calculations determining the beginning of the decline of Dharma. While the True Dharma period (wherein the Buddha's teachings are taught accurately and salvation is possible) was originally said to last 1000 years, one of the first sources of anxiety within the clergy was the acceptance of women in the monastic order, which was said to have reduced the time of True Dharma to 500 years. This is accounted for in the tale of Mahāprajāpatī, in which a woman devoutly follows the Buddha after having been refused entry into his order, until Ānanda convinces the Buddha to allow her to join the other disciples. He then tells Ānanda:

If, Ānanda, women had not obtained the going forth from home into homelessness in the dhamma and discipline proclaimed by the Truth-finder, the Brahma-faring, Ānanda, would have lasted long, true dhamma would have endured for a thousand years. But since, Ananda, women have gone forth...in the dhamma and discipline proclaimed by the Truth-finder, now Ānanda, the Brahma-faring will not last long, true dhamma will endure only for five hundred years.

— I. B. Horner, qtd.

When asked to explain why the acceptance of women into the clergy would have such an impact, it is said that he explained as such:

Even, Ānanda, as those households which have many women easily fall prey to robbers, to pot-thieves, even so, Anand dhamma and discipline women obtain the going forth from home into homelessness, that Brahma-faring will not last long.

Even, Ānanda, as when the disease known as mildew attacks a whole field of rice that field of rice does not last long, even so, Ānanda, in whatever dhamma and discipline women obtain the going forth...that Brahma–faring will not last long.

Even, Ānanda, as when the disease known as red rust attacks a whole field of sugar-cane, that field of sugar-cane does not last long, even so, Ānanda, in whatever dhamma and discipline...that Brahma-faring will not last long.

— I. B. Horner, qtd.

Thus it seems that women in the clergy, for one reason or another, were seen as a factor which sped up the process of the decline of Dharma. Otherwise, and more importantly, the cessation of Dharma was seen as being caused by the "moral laxity of the disciples, and [could] be recovered if the disciples reform[ed]". This is where a divide appears in eschatological groups: while some believe that the True Dharma can be recovered through more assiduous practice and a return to correct transmission, understanding and application of True Dharma, other groups believed that it was due to incorrect political practice from the state, and that a Saviour was required in order to overthrow the established order and set up a new era of peace and True Dharma. These ideologies were of course frowned upon by the court and such apocryphal texts, deemed dangerous, heretical, and subversive, and were a source of inspiration for the burning of apocryphal scripture. Of these saviours, one Bodhisattva in particular was eventually linked with China and so is an ideal candidate for the study of these anti-establishment groups: the Bodhisattva which came to be called Yueguang, or Prince Moonlight.

== During the Song Dynasty ==
Due to the historically tenuous relationship between Buddhism and the Confucian State, and to lead the people in accordance with proper Dharma, many eschatological groups appeared during the Sui and Tang dynasty (typically attached to monasteries) and preached that the declining Dharma cycle had begun due to moral laxity or failures of the state. Among these, many groups which preached a greater devotion to the Dharma teachings as a method of salvation were deemed harmless, and so some of their apocryphal scriptures survived the burning of heretical texts. By the Southern Song dynasty, however, the Buddhist Monastic order was under heavier and heavier restraints, such as the "control of ordination, prohibition of preaching and itinerant evangelism by monks, and restraining the economic power of the monasteries". This caused the appearance of many non-monastic groups, which were often led by laymen who had hair and might disregard other monastic rules and which preached an eschatological message, typically through one of five standard apocalyptic scenarios: The return of Maitreya, the Amida Pure Land, the Manicheaean Chen Chün, or the Confucian Enlightened Emperor. Of these groups, a particularly influential one is the White Lotus Sect. Its influence is clear in that the State later referred to any Eschatological or unorthodox Buddhist sect as "White Lotus".

Formed by Mao Ziyuan in 1133, the White Lotus sect placed an emphasis on the strict dietary restrictions of its disciples, such that they were not allowed to drink wine and had to eat a vegetarian diet. Despite these dietary restrictions which mirrored those which the monastic order should also be following, the White Lotus were led by married clergy men who "wrote their own scriptures and ritual texts in the vernacular", and the group also allowed female disciples. Mao's relationship with the state also changed throughout his life, as White Lotus was attacked by Buddhist monks soon after its founding due to its "rejection of celibacy" and by the government for its "popularity among the people". Exiled in 1131 because of the growing popularity of his movement, Mao was quickly pardoned and in 1133 began to preach at the emperor's court. He was, however, exiled again in 1157 because of his sect's popularity and similarity to Manicheaens, another vegetarian sect. His sect nonetheless continued to spread until the 20th century.

== In Nichiren Buddhism ==
Nichiren, a messianic Buddhist leader of Kamakura-era Japan, was born in 1222. During Nichiren's time, Japan had many natural disasters such as floods, storms, earthquakes, famines, landslides, tidal waves, and comets. It was believed that the period of Declining Dharma was already unfolding. Nichiren criticized the preachings of Amitabha and Pure Land Buddhist schools, and argued instead that the calamities were tied to human behaviour, and that only human righteousness could prevent natural disasters. He described the situation as such:

We have seen many signs in heaven and on earth: famines and plagues. The whole country is filled with misery. Horses and cows are dying on the roadsides, and so are men; and there is no one to bury them. Over half of the population is dead, and there is no one to mourn for them. Meanwhile, the survivors invoke the saving power of Amitabha Buddha of the Western Paradise or the compassion of the Healing Buddha of the East... According to the Esoteric Buddhist teaching, they use copious sprinkling of holy water from the five vases, or they sit in meditation, resigning to the voidness of all. Some write the names of the seven gods of luck on pieces of paper and affix them by the hundreds on the door-posts of their houses, while others do the same with the pictures of the five mighty bodhisattvas or pay homage to the gods of heaven and earth... But let men do what they will, the famines and the plagues still rage. There are beggars on every hand, and unburied corpses line the road.

— Nichiren, qtd.

Nichiren instead preached that only a return to the teachings of the Lotus Sutra would save the country from destruction. His preaching of the Lotus Sutra, as well as his disparagement of Honen Buddhist groups, were met with much resistance, and he was imprisoned or exiled several times during his life. During one such occasion, he was nearly executed, but was saved by miraculous circumstances in which the sky was "suddenly ablaze with lightning" and the executioner became dizzy and fell. Because of the miraculous nature of his survival, Nichiren would come to believe that his body had died, only to begin his second spiritual life. This only served to strengthen his self-image as a messianic saviour of Japan, and he would preach the Lotus Sutra until his death in 1282.

Nichiren's belief system was his explication of the Mongol invasions of Japan in 1274 and 1281. Because of his belief that the apocalypse was coming due to the moral deprivation of the population of Japan, Nichiren saw the coming Mongols as a natural force sent to eradicate the incorrect beliefs and practices of the Honen monks and local religious practitioners in order to instate the True Dharma in their aftermath. He believed, even after both invasions failed, that only a "complete and sudden conversion" would save the country from the destruction created by the monks of other sects and faiths.

== See also ==
- Bhadrakalpikasutra
- Calingae
- Longevity myths
- Mandi
- Three Ages of Buddhism
- The sixteen dreams of King Pasenadi
