= Kaagapujandar =

Tamil Hindu saint

Sri Kaagapujandar
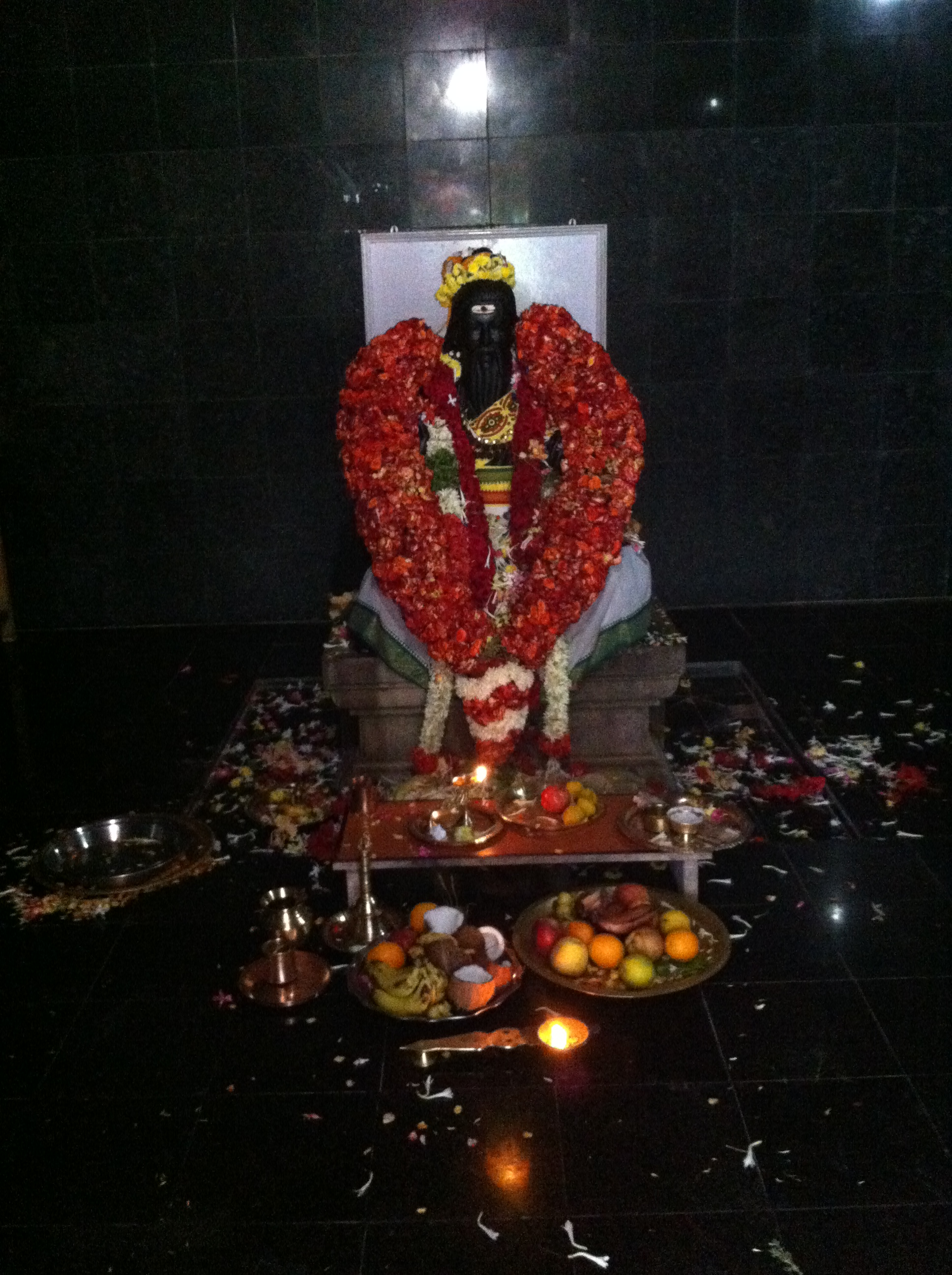
- Consecrated at Kaga Ashram, Thiruvannamalai, India

Sri Kaagapujandar or Kakabhushundi (Tamil: காகபுஜண்டர்) is considered to be an eminent siddha in Siddhar tradition, a saint who has reached a particularly high degree of physical and spiritual perfection. According to legends he lived around the 7th century CE. The jeeva samadhi of Sri Kaagapujandar is located at the Sornapureeshwar Temple in Thenponparapi village, near Chinna salem, Villupuram District. His birth star is Ayilyam. Sri Kaagapujandar was mentioned by Karuvoorar and author K.S.Pillai as one of the 18 siddhars (பதினென் சித்தர்கள்).

He is also called Kaagapusundi, Kaagapusundar, and Pujankar.

A verse from His book Gnanam 80

தானென்ற பிரமத்தை யடுத்திடாமல்
தரணியில் தெய்வமடா அனந்த மென்றும்

- 'Forgetting to embrace the self-god within, we search this wide world for various divine solutions '

== Legends about Kaagapujandar ==
Sri Kaagapujandar, according to legend, has seen many destructions of the universe(pralaya) and recreation of new one as a crow, hence the name Kaga. Kagam in Tamil means crow. Sri Kaagapujandar is the master in the art of Immortality. He is the one who obtains diksha (initiation) from Almighty Lord Shiva in every era. Sri Kaagapujandar gave upadhesa (instruction) to Sri Vashistar, guru of Sri Rama as mentioned in Yoga Vasistha.

Siddhar Sri Roma rishi is said to be son of Sri Kaagapujandar.

He was a great devotee of Lord Shree Rama and was granted the boon to see his lilas.

== Books ==
Sri Kaagapujandar wrote many books in Tamil, written on palm leaves; most have been lost. Those remaining were transferred onto paper with the help of siddhas and palm readers. The book Perunool kaviyam 1000 (Tamil:பெருநூல் காவியம் 1000) has an account of most of the siddhas. Below listed the songs where the particular siddhas are mentioned.

- Agasthiyar - Song 141
- Bogar, Karuvoorar, Dhanvantari - Song 143
- Pulasthyar, Sattaimuni, Macchamuni, Korakkar, Rama Devar - Song 155
- Thirumoolar - Song 279
- Vashishtar, Krishnakonaar, Vyaasar - Song 440
- Vishwamithrar, Konkanar - Song 782
- Thiruvalluvar, Kasinathar, Dhadheechi nathar, Koormamuni, Athri - Song 783
- Idaikadar, Kalai kotaan - Song 784

== Temples ==
Kaagapujandar
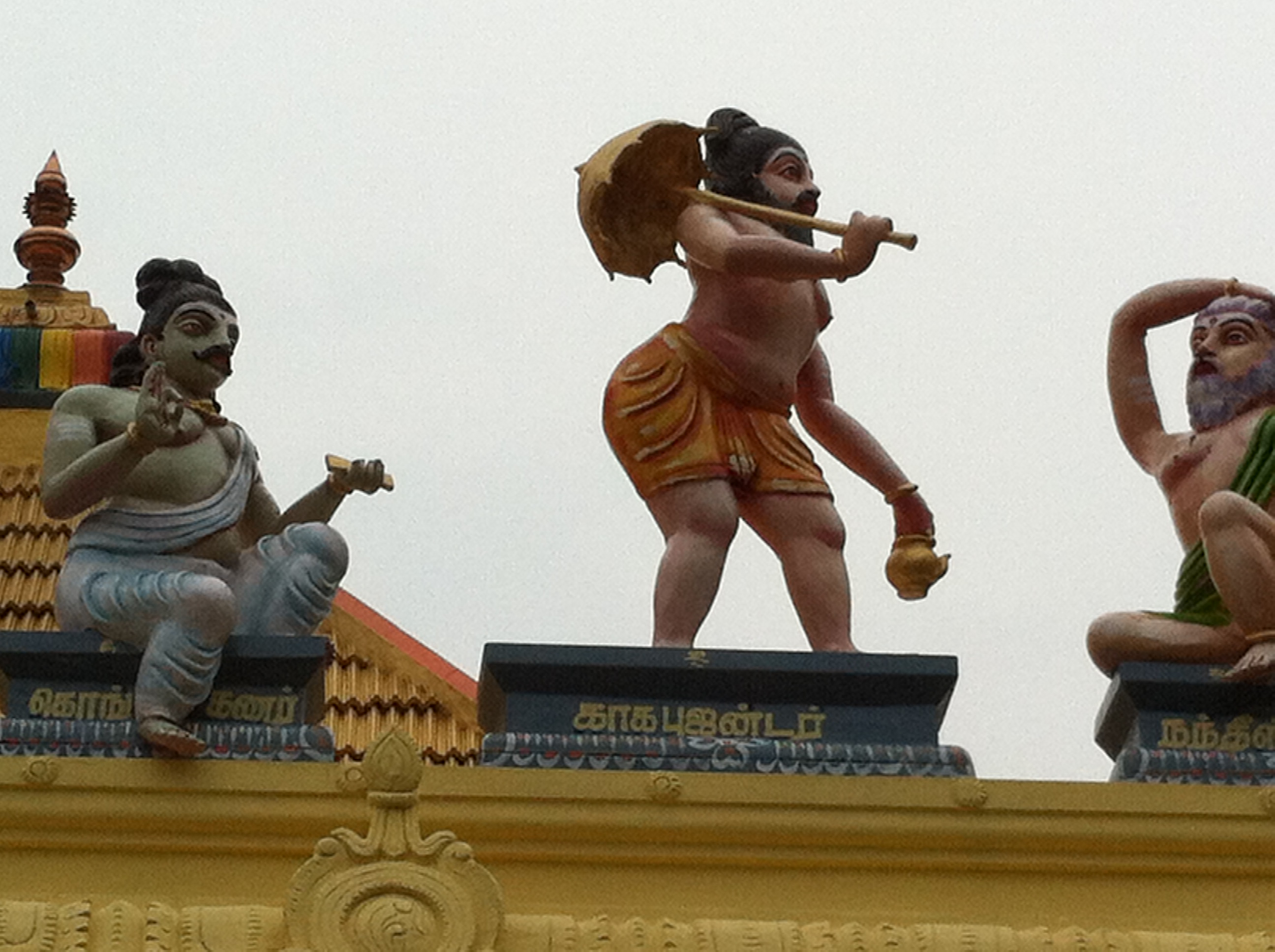
- Kaagapujandar on temple gopuram as one of 18 Siddhars

- Swarnapureeshwarar Temple, Chinna Salem, Tamil Nadu
- Sri Swarna Kala Bhairavar Temple, Aati Sakthi Peetam (Previously known as Kaga Ashram), Thiruvannamalai, Tamil Nadu
- Siddharghal Temple, Madambakkam, Chennai, Tamil Nadu
- Sri Shakti Arutkoodam, Tambaram, Chennai, Tamil Nadu

== See also ==
- Rishi
- Bhusunda
