= Sadhyas =

Class of deities in Hinduism

The sadhyas (Sanskrit: साध्य, romanized: Sādhya) refers to a class of minor deities in Hinduism. According to the Puranas, they are the sons of Dharma and Sadhya, a daughter of Daksha. Numbering either twelve or seventeen according to various texts, the sadhyas are described to be the embodiments of the rituals and hymns of the Vedas. They are stated to reside with the devas, or dwell in the region between heaven and earth.

== Description ==
The Puranas feature the sadhyas among the nine classes (gaṇas) of deities, among the adityas, rudras, vasus, visvedevas, tushitas, abhasvaras, anilas, and the maharajikas. They are sometimes referred to as a class of the devas, or the gaṇadevas.

The Agni Purana offers a list of the twelve sadhyas:

- Manas
- Mantā
- Prāṇa
- Nara
- Apāna
- Vīrayān
- Vibhu
- Haya
- Naya
- Haṁsa
- Nārāyaṇa
- Prabhu

== Literature ==
=== Upanishads ===
The Mundaka Upanishad describes the origin of the sadhyas from Brahman, the Ultimate Reality.

=== Shiva Purana ===
According to the Shiva Purana, the sadhyas serve as the attendants of Shiva, under the command of Ganesha. They are regarded to reside on the Gaṇaparvata mountain, situated on Kailasha.

=== Mahabharata ===
The sadhyas fight with Kartikeya in his battle against Tarakasura.

=== Bhagavad Gita ===
Arjuna mentions the sadhyas as one of the classes that are awed by Krishna's vishvarupa form.
