= Mandi (legendary creature) =

Legendary Indian peoples

The Mandi, according to Pliny the Elder, are a short-lived people from India. Pliny equates the Mandi, named by Cleitarchus and Megasthenes, whose women can bear children in their seventh year and who become old at forty, with the Macrobii, whose women only have children once in their lives. Pliny also states that Agatharchides describes them as living off of a diet of locusts and being swift-footed.

== See also ==
- Calingi
- Buddhist eschatology, where a similar short-living race is mentioned.
