= Pramlocha =

Apsara in Hindu mythology

- Affiliation: Apsara
- Abode: Devaloka
- Texts: Brahma Purana

Genealogy
- Spouse: Kandu
- Children: Marisha

Pramlocha (Sanskrit: प्रम्लोचा, romanized: Pramlocā) is an apsara in Hindu mythology, described as a beautiful, celestial damsel. She appears in the story of the rishi Kandu.

== Legend ==
In the Brahma Purana, Pramlocha is asked by Indra, the king of Svarga, to disturb the penance of the rishi Kandu, whose practice scorched the three worlds with its intensity. He recruits her because she is proud of her beauty and youth, bearing a slender waist and attractive breasts. Aware of the prowess of the sage, the apsara is anxious, and requests Indra to choose Menaka, Urvashi, or Rambha instead. Indra assures her that she would be assisted in this task by Kama, Vasanta, and the gentle breeze, upon which she consents. She reaches the forest that Kandu meditated in filled with trees, flowers, and lakes. She vowed that she would "get him split up by the arrows of Kama":

Standing on the banks of the river, only a very short distance from him, that excellent celestial damsel with the sweetness of the cuckoo in her voice began to sing songs merrily.

An untimely but sweet and charming note of the cuckoo was heard and Vasanta exerted his full force.

A gentle breeze with his abode in the Malaya mountain blew there making the excellent flowers fall down gently into small or big heaps.

Holding the flowery arrows, Kama went near that sage and made his mind agitated.

On hearing the sweet sound of the song the sage was surprised and his mind was afflicted by the arrows of Kāma. He went to the place where the lady of beautiful eyebrows was standing.

On seeing her he was delighted with wonder; his eyes beamed. He experienced horripilation all over his body. His upper garment dropped down. He was completely upset.

— Brahma Purana, Chapter 69

When enquired about her identity. Pramlocha declares herself to be his servant-maid, willing to do his bidding. Enraptured, Kandu takes the apsara by her hand and goes to his hermitage. He assumed his youthful form within, bedecked in divine ornaments and handsome attributes due to the power of his penance. Neglecting to perform his Vedic duties, he jubilantly engaged in sexual intercourse with her day and night. In the valley of Mandara, he had sex with her for a century, after which she requested his permission to return to heaven. He ordered her to stay for a few more days, and another century elapsed. When she repeated her request after this period, he sought her company for a few more days. Afraid of being cursed by the formidable Brahmin, she stayed with him, and he indulged her with his affections. One day, he rushed out of his hut in a hurry to perform his sandhyavandana, his dusk prayers, and the puzzled apsara realises that the sage believed that all the time that had elapsed had been within the duration of a single day. Pramlocha reveals to him that nine hundred and seven years, six months and three days, had passed since she had arrived. Realising that the power of his austerities had been extinguished by his amorous activities, he banishes her, not realising that she is pregnant. The trembling damsel ran from tree to tree, the foetus she carried appearing out of her limbs in the form of sweat and nursed by the trees and the moonlight. This child, Marisha, became the wife of Prachetas, and the mother of Daksha.

== See also ==
- Apsara
- Prachetas
- Daksha
