= Maharajikas =

Class of deities in Hinduism

The maharajikas (Sanskrit: महाराजिक, romanized: Mahārājika) refers to a class of minor deities in Hinduism, numbering 220 or 236 members.

== Description ==
The Puranas feature the maharajikas among the nine classes (gaṇas) of deities, among the adityas, rudras, vasus, visvedevas, tushitas, abhasvaras, anilas, and the sadhyas. They are sometimes referred to as a class of the devas, or the gaṇadevas. According to the Shiva Purana, the maharajikas serve as the attendants of Shiva, under the command of Ganesha. They are regarded to reside on the Gaṇaparvata mountain, situated on Kailasha.
