= Abhasvaras =

Class of deities in Hinduism and location in Buddhism

Abhasvaras (Sanskrit: आभास्वर, romanized: Ābhāsvara) is a term used in Buddhism to refer to a heaven and in Hinduism to refer to a class of deities.

== Buddhism ==
In Buddhism, Abhasvaras is the name of a heaven. The words roots are Sanskrit (from "a" near to, towards + the verbal root "bhas" to shine upon, illuminate).

== Hinduism ==
In Hinduism, abhasvaras refers to a class of deities featured in the Puranas. They are 64 in number, and described to be personifications of mental qualities, serving as the sovereigns of all varieties of spiritual and physical enlightenment. The twelve primary abhasvaras are:

- Ātmā
- Kāma
- Krodha
- Jñātā
- Jñāna
- Tapas
- Dama
- Dānta
- Mada
- Moha
- Śānti
- Sama

The abhasvaras are referred to as one of the nine gana deities: adityas, visvedevas, vasus, tushitas, abhasvaras, anilas, maharajikas, sadhyas, and the rudras. They are stated to be the attendants of deities such as Shiva, Ganesha, and Vayu, dwelling on Gaṇaparvata, located on Kailasha.
