= Visvedevas =

Class of deities in Hinduism

The visvedevas (Sanskrit: विश्वेदेव, IAST: Viśvēdēva) refers to the designation used to address the entirety of the various deities featured in the Vedas. It also refers to a specific classification of deities in the Puranas. The visvedevas are sometimes regarded as the most comprehensive gathering of the gods, a classification in which no deity is stated to be omitted.

== Literature ==
=== Rigveda ===
In the Rigveda a number of hymns are addressed to these deities, including (according to Griffith): 1.3, 1.89, 3.54-56, 4.55, 5.41-51, 6.49-52, 7.34-37, 39, 40, 42, 43, 8.27-30, 58, 83 10.31, 35, 36, 56, 57, 61-66, 92, 93, 100, 101, 109, 114, 126, 128, 137, 141, 157, 165, 181.

RV 3.54.17 addresses them as headed by Indra:

This is, ye Wise, your great and glorious title, that all ye Deities abide in Indra. (trans. Griffith)

The dichotomy between devas is not evident in these hymns, and the devas are invoked together such as Mitra and Varuna. Though many devas are named in the Rigveda, only 33 devas are counted, eleven of them present each in earth, space, and heaven.

=== Manusmriti ===
According to Manu (iii, 90, 121), offerings should be made daily to the visvedevas. These privileges were bestowed on them by Brahma and the Pitri as a reward for severe austerities they had performed on the Himalayas.

=== Puranas ===
In later Hinduism, the visvedevas form one of the nine ganadevatas (along with the adityas, vasus, tushitas, abhasvaras, anilas, maharajikas, sadhyas, and rudras). According to the Vishnu Purana and Padma Purana, they were the sons of Vishvā, a daughter of Daksha, described as follows:

- Vasu
- Satya
- Kratu
- Daksha
- Kala
- Kama
- Dhrti
- Kuru
- Pururavas
- Madravas
- Rocaka or Locana
- Dhvani or Dhuri

=== Mahabharata ===
The visvedevas are described to have incarnated on earth due to the curse of sage Vishvamitra, as the five sons of Draupadi with the Pandavas - the Draupadeyas. They are described to have returned to their original forms after being killed by Ashvatthama at night.

== See also ==
- Adityas
- Vasus
- Rudras
- Rigvedic deities
