= Tushita =

Heaven in Buddhism and Hinduism

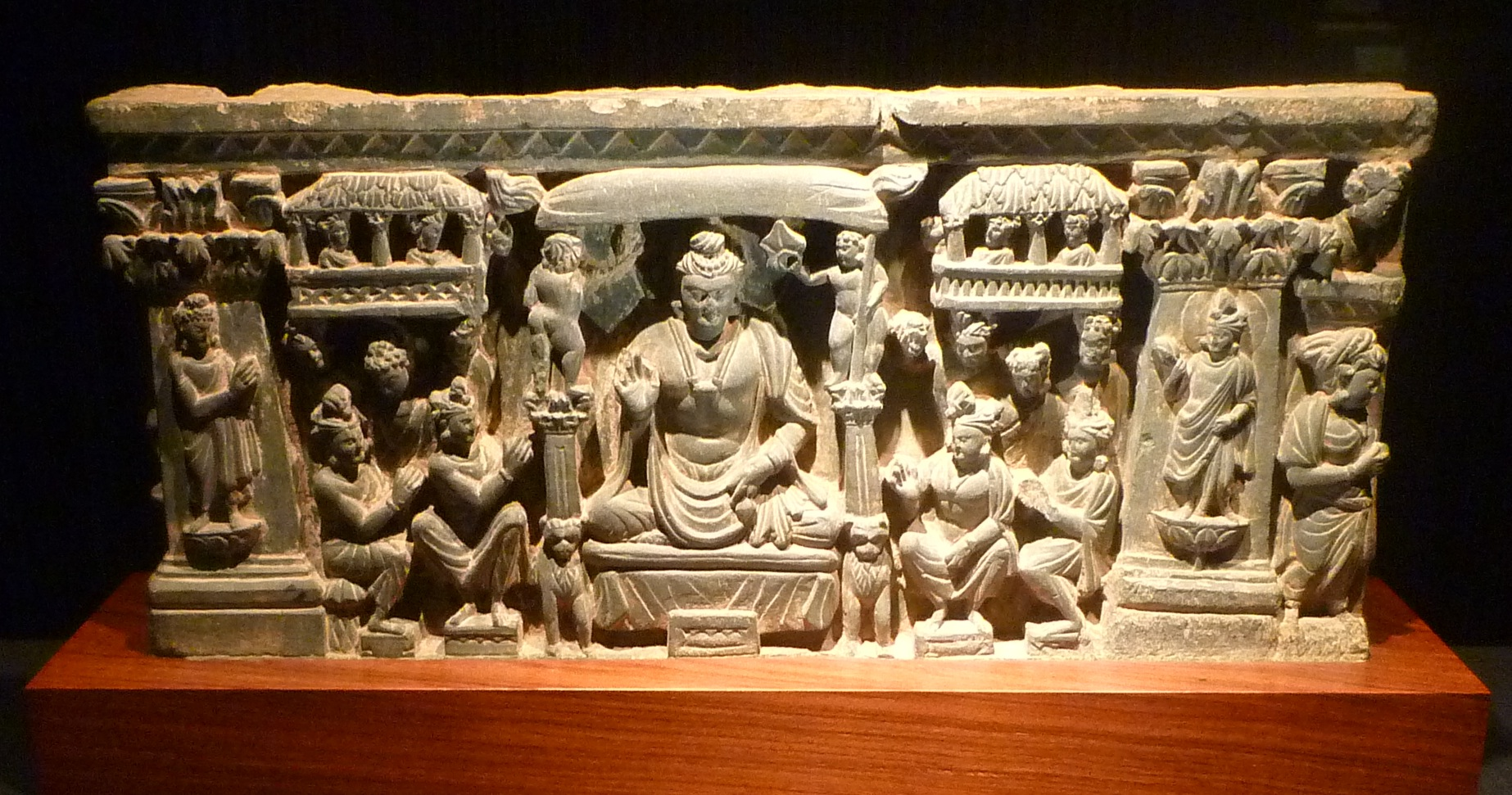
Stone relief carving of Tushita Heaven, carved during the Kushan Dynasty

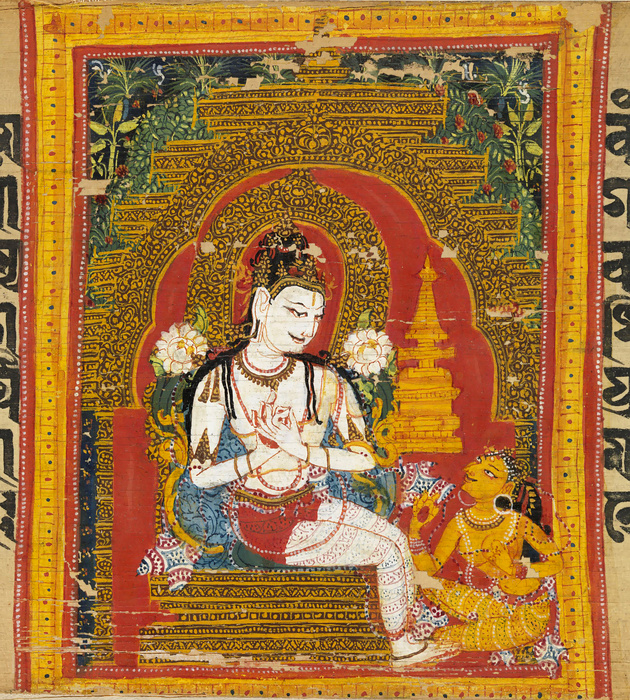
Maitreya Bodhisattva in Tushita Heaven. Palm leaf manuscript. Nalanda, Bihar, India

Tuṣita (Sanskrit, Pāli Tusita) or Tushita is one of the six deva-worlds of the Buddhist Desire realm (Kāmadhātu), located between the Yāma heaven and the Nirmāṇarati heaven. Like the other heavens, Tuṣita is said to be reachable through meditation. It is the heaven where the Bodhisattva Śvetaketu ("White Banner") resided before being reborn on Earth as Gautama Buddha, the historical fourth Buddha. It is, likewise, the heaven where the Bodhisattva Nātha ("Protector") currently resides, who will be reborn as the future fifth Buddha Maitreya.

Most Buddhist scriptures state that Queen Mayadevi died seven days after giving birth at Lumbini to her son Prince Siddhartha, who became Gautama Buddha or the Buddha, and that she was reborn in the Tushita Heaven. Then seven years after the Buddha's enlightenment, Mayadevi came down to visit Tavatimsa Heaven, where the Buddha specifically preached the Abhidharma to her, and to the other gods in the realm.

In Hinduism, the Tushitas are referred to as one of the nine gana deities: adityas, visvedevas, vasus, tushitas, abhasvaras, anilas, maharajikas, sadhyas, and the rudras.

== Descriptions ==
Like all heaven realms in Buddhism, the Tuṣita Heaven is the residence of divine beings or devas. According to the Visakhuposatha Sutta of the Pali Canon, time runs much differently than on Earth:

That which among men is four hundred years, Visakha, is one night and day of the Tusita devas, their month has thirty of those days, their year twelve of those months; the lifespan of the Tusita devas is four thousand of those heavenly years...

== Buddhist View ==
In Mahayana Buddhist thought, the Tuṣita Heaven is where all Bodhisattvas destined to reach full enlightenment in their next life dwell for a time. One such reference can be found in the Larger Sutra of Immeasurable Life, a Mahayana text:

Each of these bodhisattvas, following the virtues of the Mahasattva Samantabhadra, is endowed with the immeasurable practices and vows of the Bodhisattva Path, and firmly dwells in all the meritorious deeds. He freely travels in all the ten quarters and employs skillful means of emancipation. He enters the treasury of the Dharma of the Buddhas, and reaches the Other Shore. Throughout the innumerable worlds he attains Enlightenment. First, dwelling in the Tusita Heaven, he proclaims the true Dharma. Having left the heavenly palace, he descends into his mother's womb.

The Tuṣita heaven is therefore closely associated with Maitreya, and many Mahayana Buddhists vow to be reborn there so that they can hear the teachings of the Bodhisattva and ultimately be reborn with him when he becomes a Buddha. Other Bodhisattvas dwell in this heaven realm from time to time. Tuṣita is part of the same world-system as Earth, and so is relatively close, whereas the Pure Land of Amitabha Buddha is treated as a separate world-system entirely.
