= Calingae =

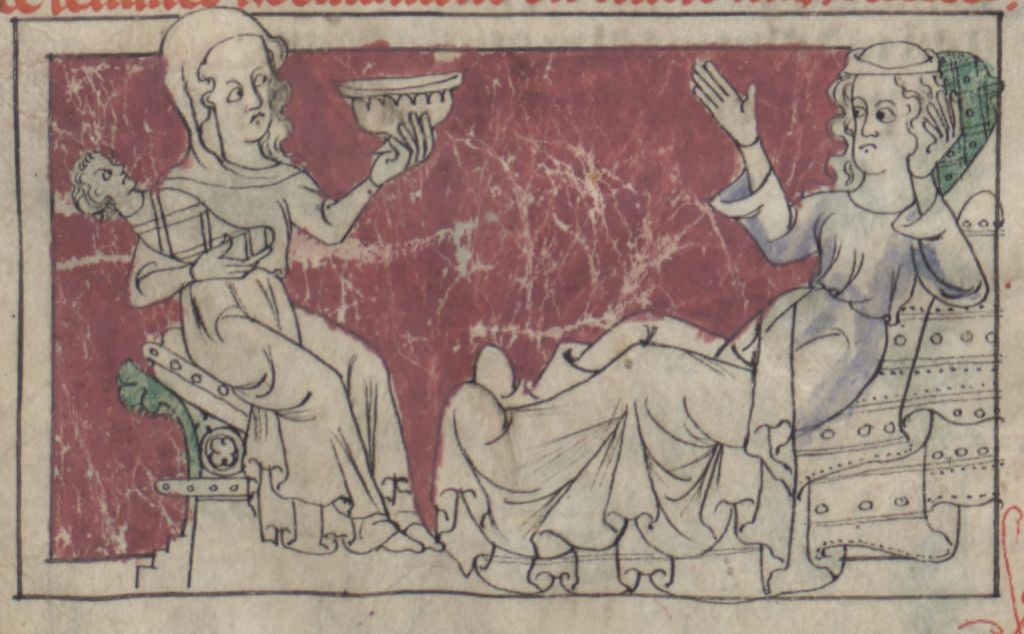
"Women who bear children at age five" (Calingae (Note: Text does not explicitly refer to them as the Calingae, but identified as "Calinge" by Mandragore, manuscript image database of Bibliothèque nationale de France.)). —ca. 1308-1312, from Thomas de Kent's Alexander romance, held by Bibliothèque nationale de France.

The Calingae or Calingi, according to ancient accounts, were a race of extremely short-lived people in India. According to Pliny the Elder they had a lifespan of only eight years. This has been viewed as exaggeration, akin to Pliny's report that the Mandi people of India bear children at age seven.

The Calingae were widely diffused over a large area according to Pliny, (Note: Pliny borrowed (or quoted) his account of India in Book VI.21–23 from Megasthenes.'"`UNIQ--ref-00000001-QINU`"') and consisted of the Calingae proper, the Gangarides-Calingae and the Macco-Calingae. This may have been a reference to the Tri-kalinga ("Three Kalingas") that appeared in the Puranas. (Note: Alexander Cunningham had made this observation.) The area of diffusion is thought to roughly coincide with the Northern Circars (now spanning the states of Andhra Pradesh and Odisha). Their chief cities were Dandagula (Dandaguda) and Parthalis (Protalis). According to political scientist Sudama Misra, the Kalinga janapada originally comprised the area covered by the Puri and Ganjam districts.

== See also ==
- Buddhist eschatology, where a similar short-living race is mentioned.
