= Chedipe =

Witch-vampire in the folklore around the Godavari River in India

Chedipe (Hindi: चेदिप, literally "prostitute") is a witch-vampire in the folklore of the region around the Godavari River in India. They are associated with the betals,. Women who die an unnatural death, such as in childbirth or by suicide, and prostitutes may become chedipes. Chedipes are sometimes characterized as being undead.

The chedipe is described as a vulgar woman riding on a tiger in the moonlit night. The typical chedipe story carries out with them choosing a house and magically forcing the closed doors of the house open, to which she enters naked. She casts a spell on the residents of the home, putting them in a deep sleep. She then sucks the blood of all of the men in the house through their toes. Some traditions say that she feasts only on the strongest man of the house. Others suggest that the chedipe targets only the man whom she dislikes. In the morning, the victim of the chedipe will awaken from their sleep with no memory of the chedipe's visit. He will be sapped of his virility and will feel uneasy and slightly intoxicated for the entirety of the following day. If he does not receive medical treatment, the chedipe will return. In another narrative, she is described as returning repeatedly before the victim can recover from the blood and energy loss, thus weakening him further. If he is not treated, the man withers away and dies.

The chedipe also has sexual intercourse with the sleeping victim in many cases, resulting in suspicions of infidelity in the mind of the victim's wife. This shatters the marital concord of the household, ending love and trust in the family. The chedipe feasts on the resulting sadness and pain. She may also pluck out the tongue of her victim, instantaneously killing him. The chedipe may also inflict wounds on the skin and insert sticks in the body of the man, which will burn like fire.

Sometimes, the chedipe undresses and turns into a tiger with one human leg and attacks men in the forest. This form is known as Murulupuli ("enchanting tiger"). If the man retaliates with a weapon, she flees. If someone recognizes her in the tiger form, she assumes her real form and pretends to be digging for roots in the jungle.
