= Arasavalli Sun Temple =

Surya temple in Andhra Pradesh, India

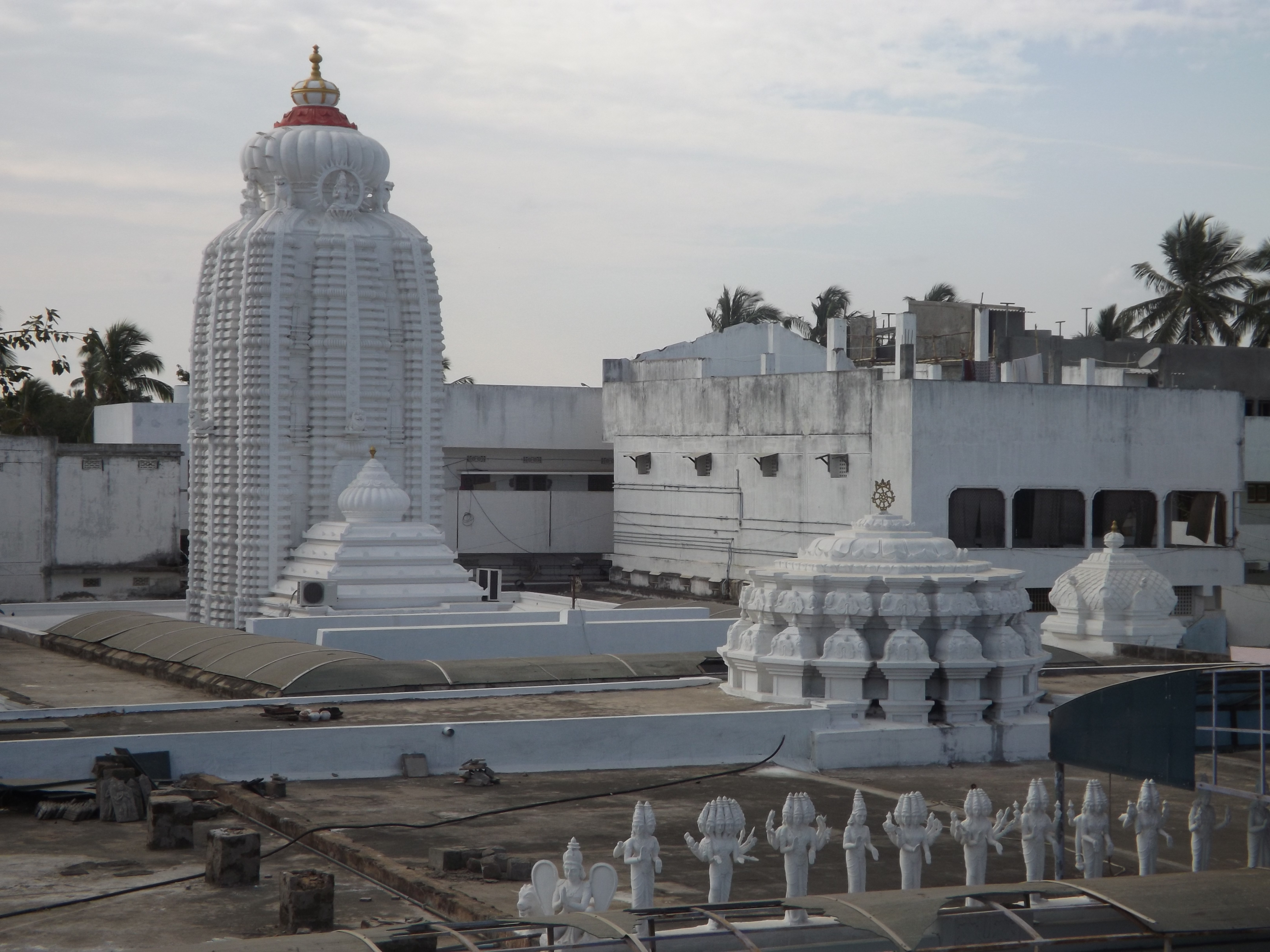
- Arasavilli Sri Suryanarayanamurty Temple

- Location of Arasavalli in Andhra Pradesh

Religion
- Affiliation: Hinduism
- District: Srikakulam
- Deity: Surya
- Festivals: Ratha Saptami, Maha Shivaratri

Location
- Location: Arasavalli
- State: Andhra Pradesh
- Country: India
- Coordinates: 18.287929°N 83.913635°E

Architecture
- Type: Kalinga architecture
- Creator: Devendra Varma
- Completed: 7th century CE

Arasavalli Sri Surya Narayana Swamy Devalayam is a temple for Lord Surya, the solar deity, at Arasavalli in the Indian state of Andhra Pradesh. It is located in Arasavalli Village 1 km east of Srikakulam. It is believed that the temple was built in 7th century CE by King Devendra Varma, a great ruler of Eastern Ganga Dynasty of Kalinga. The present structure is largely a result of 18th-century renovations. The temple was built in Rekha deula style of Kalinga Architecture like Puri Jagannath temple of Odisha. This temple is considered one of the oldest sun temples in India. The temple is one of the two major (remaining out of three, as the third temple was destroyed by Sikandar Shah Miri) temples who worship Lord Surya in India. The other two are the Konark Sun Temple, Odisha and Martand Sun Temple, Jammu and Kashmir (union territory).

== History ==
According to Padmapuranam, Sage Kasyapa installed the Idol of Surya at Arasavalli for the welfare of mankind. The Surya is of Kasyapasa Gotra. He is also termed a planetary King.

The walls are inscribed saying the creator of the temple was the ruler Devendra Varma, stating it was built in the time period known to them as the 7th century. The walls also state the temple was fixed and changed to help with some of the sun temple's major flaws during the 18th and 19th century. Many of these changes were donated by the Dusi family. The temple fell into disrepair over the centuries and was reconstructed in 1778 CE by Elamanchili Pullaji Panthulu. Over the years the Sun temple was a landmark for many of the festivals celebrated in the town. Including festival Rathasaptami.

== Design ==
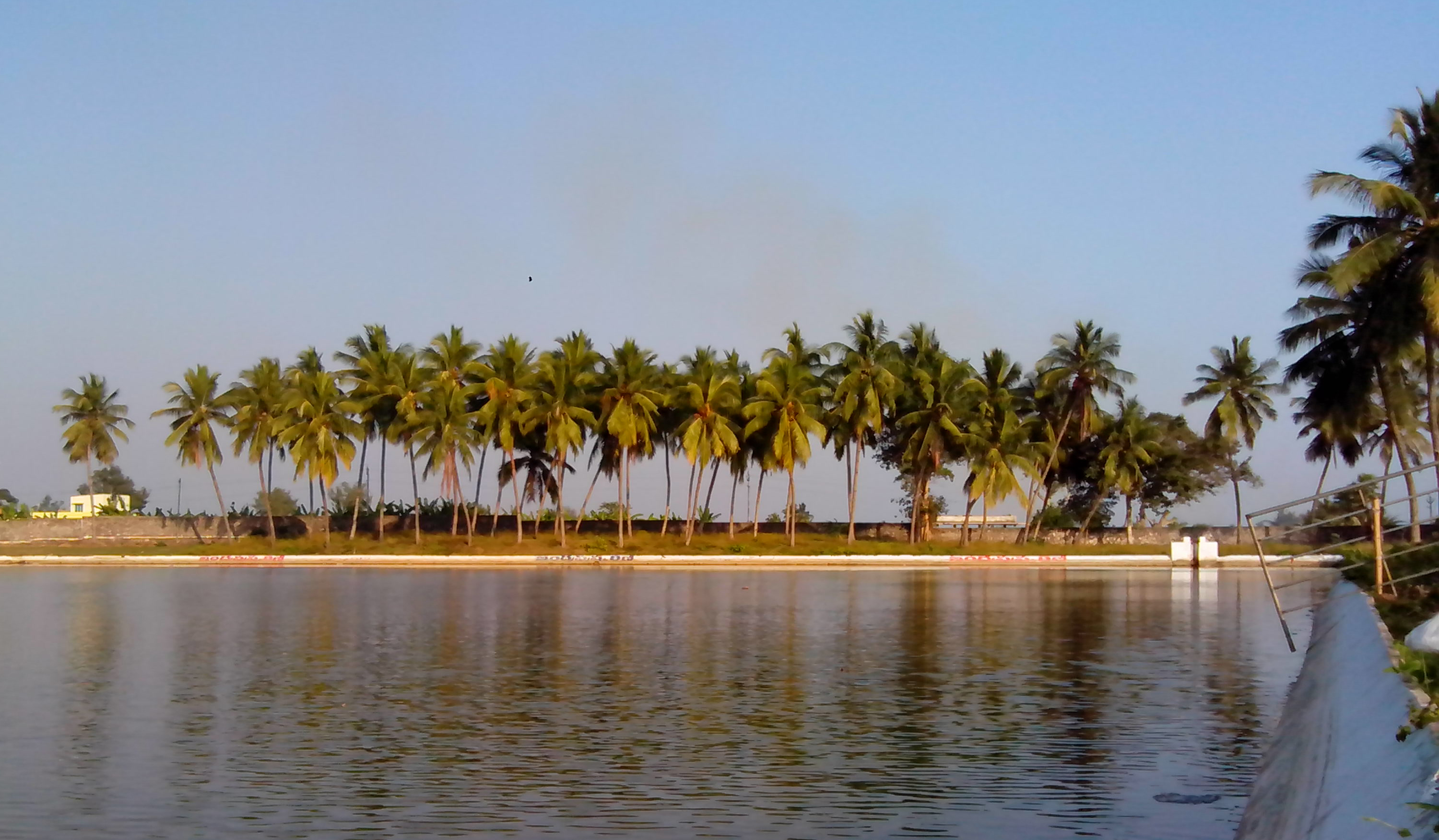
Indra Pushkarini (Temple tank) at Arasavilli

The temple is recognized as an architectural achievement. It employed the skills of Vishwakarma Brahmins or Maharanas of Odisha. The early morning sun falls on the feet of the deity twice a year (Uttaraynam - March 9–11 and Dakshinayam - October 1–3), even when the 5 entrance gates are closed.

== See also ==
- Konark Sun Temple
