= Ratha Saptami =

Hindu festival dedicated to Surya

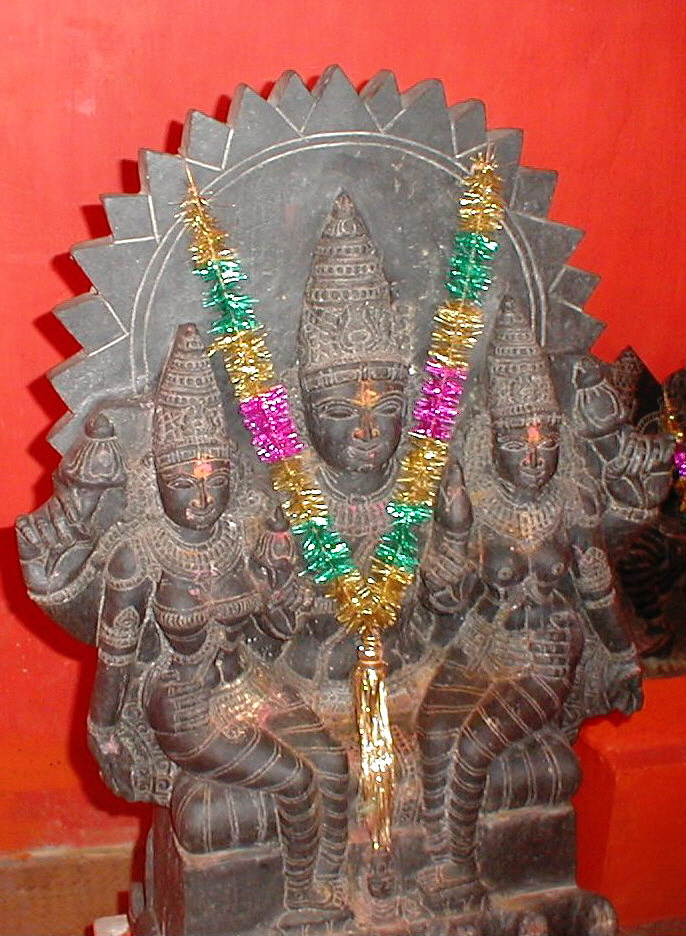
- Surya with consorts Sanjana and Chhaya
- Also called: Surya Jayanti, Achala Saptami, Magha Saptami
- Observed by: Hindus
- Significance: Commemorate the birth anniversary of Lord Surya.
- Begins: Magha Shukla Saptami
- Frequency: Annual
- Related to: Worship of Surya

Ratha Saptami (Sanskrit: रथसप्तमी, romanized: Rathasaptamī), also rendered Magha Saptami, is a Hindu festival that falls on the seventh day (saptami) in the bright half (Shukla Paksha) of the Hindu month Magha. It is symbolically represented in the form of the sun-god Surya turning his ratha (chariot) drawn by seven horses (representing the seven colours) towards the northern hemisphere, in a north-easternly direction. It also marks the birth of Surya and is hence also celebrated as Surya Jayanti (the sun-god’s birthday). In recognition of its cultural and spiritual importance, the Government of Andhra Pradesh officially declared Ratha Saptami a state festival in December 2024, to be celebrated for three days, particularly at the prominent Sri Suryanarayana Swamy temple in Arasavalli, Srikakulam district.

Ratha Saptami is symbolic of the change of season to spring and the start of the harvesting season. For most Indian farmers, it is an auspicious beginning of the New Year. The festival is observed by all Hindus in their houses and in innumerable temples dedicated to Surya, across India.

== Background ==
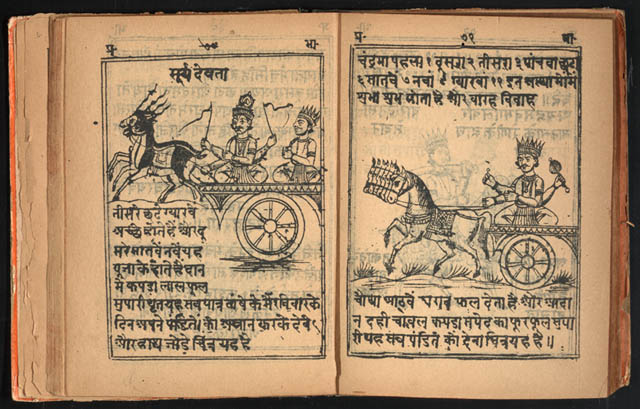
Surya's chariot

Sun worship is deep rooted in the Vedas of the Hindu religion and its antiquity also relates to several mythologies of the world such as that of China, Egypt and Mesopotamia. The Gayatri Mantra japa – the sacred Vedic chants to Savitr (the Vedic sun god) – is popularly recited by adherents. As Puranic Hinduism evolved, the worship of the sun was consolidated.

In the Rigveda Mandala 10/Hymn 85, the sun god's bride seated on a chariot pulled by two steeds is mentioned.

The relevant verses (translated from Sanskrit by Ralph Griffith) are as follows:

Her spirit was the bridal car; the covering thereof was heaven: Bright were both Steeds that drew it when Surya approached her husband's home.
Thy Steeds were steady, kept in place by holy verse and Sama-hymn: All cars were thy two chariot wheels: thy path was tremulous in the sky,
Clean, as thou wentest, were thy wheels wind, was the axle fastened there. Surya, proceeding to his Lord, mounted a spirit-fashionied car.

== Religious significance ==
Ratha Saptami is symbolically represented in the form of the sun god Surya turning his ratha drawn by seven horses, with Aruṇa as the charioteer, towards the northern hemisphere, in a north-easterly direction. The symbolic significance of the ratha and the seven horses reigned to it is that it represents the seven colours of the rainbow. The seven horses are also said to represent the seven days of a week starting with Sunday, the day of Sun god Surya. The chariot has 12 wheels, which represents the 12 signs (each of 30 degrees) of the Zodiac (360 degrees) and constituting a full year, named Samvatsara. The Sun’s own house is Leo (Simha) and he moves from one house to the next every month and the total cycle takes 365 days to complete. The Ratha Saptami festival seeks the benevolent cosmic spread of energy and light from the sun god.

Ratha Saptami also marks the gradual increase in temperature across South India and awaits the arrival of spring, which is later heralded by the festival of Gudi Padwa, Ugadi, or the Hindu lunar New Year day in the month of Chaitra.

=== Legends ===
Ratha Saptami also marks the birth of Surya to sage Kashyapa and his wife Aditi and hence celebrated as Surya Jayanti (the Sun-god’s birthday). A legend is narrated by the Kamboja empire’s King Yashovarma, a noble king who had no heir to rule his kingdom. On his special prayers to God, he was blessed with a son. The king’s vows did not end with this, as his son was terminally ill. A saint who visited the king advised that his son should perform the Ratha Saptami pooja (worship) with reverence to rid of his past sins. Once the King’s son performed this, his health was restored and he ruled his kingdom well.

== Sun temples ==
Sun Temples in India
Surya idol at Konarak temple	Sun Temple, Modhera	Arsavalli

There are Surya temples all across India where Ratha Sapthami is fervently celebrated. However, the most famous one is the World Heritage Site of the Konarak Sun Temple, in Konark, Odisha. Besides Konark, there is another sun temple in Odisha, the Biranchinarayan Temple, Buguda, Ganjam District. There are sun temples in Modhera, Gujarat, created by king Bhimdev of the Chaulukya dynasty, in Arasavalli, Andhra Pradesh and in clusters of Navagraha temples in Tamil Nadu and Assam. The Sun Temple at Martand (Jammu and Kashmir) and Sun Temple of Multan are temples, which were destroyed by muslim invaders in the past.

== Religious observances ==
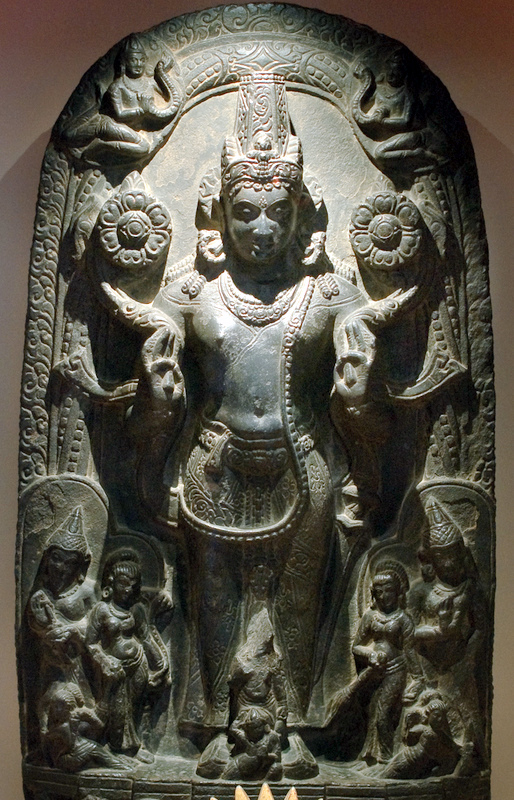
Surya, the sun god

Vishnu, in his form as Surya, is usually worshipped on this day. Usually, Rathasapthami begins in households with a purification bath (bathing is also done in a river or sea) by holding several Ekka (Calotropis Gigantea) leaves on their head while bathing and chanting a verse which is supposed to invoke the benevolence of the deity in all that one indulges in during the rest of the year. Argyam or (Tharpanam) (water held in the palms) is offered to the sun god on this day while chanting hymns are performed to the sun god. It also involves doing a puja with the ritual Naivedhya (food offering to God), and offering of flowers and fruits. Important prayers offered to the Sun god on this occasion are the Adityahridayam, Gayathri, Suryashtakam, Surya Sahasram namam. The preferred time for the pooja is within one hour after sunrise. In places like Mysore and Melkote, ceremonial processions carry the Surya Mandala - the icon of Surya.

Arka (in Sanskrit, meaning a ray or flash of lightning) leaves, also called Aak in Hindi, Ekka (in Kannada), Jilledu in Telugu, Erukkam in Tamil and Calotropis Gigantea (bowstring hemp) in English. Arka is also a synonym for Surya or Sun. Its significance to sun god could be compared to the significance of tulasi (Ocimum tenuiflorum) leaves to Vishnu. Arka leaves are also used for worship of god Ganesha known by the name Arka Ganesha and also for Hanuman worship. Its stems, called samidha (sacrificial offerings of wood) are used for the yajna ritual as a sacrificial offering to a ritual fire. Its shape is said to represent the shoulders and chariot of sun god. Its use during the ritualistic ceremonious bath involves placement of seven leaves - one on the head, two on the shoulders, two on the knees and two on the feet. On this day, in South India, Kolam is drawn with coloured rice powder depicting a chariot and seven horses as symbolic of the Ratha Saptami. Cowdung cake is also burnt at the centre of this depiction and milk boiled on the fire is offered to the sun god. In some of the important Vaishnavite temples such as the Tirumala, Srirangam, Srirangapattana and Melukote, Ratha Saptami is one of the important festivals of the year. The ratha yatra of Veera Venkatesha of Sri Venkatramana Temple in Mangalore is held on this day and is famously known as Kodial Teru or Mangaluru Rathotsava.

=== Tirumala ===
On Ratha Saptami, a one-day Brahmotsavam is held in Tirumala. On this day, the murtis of the presiding deity of Malayappa Swamy, along with his divine consorts Sridevi and Bhudevi, are taken to a procession in the processional streets in Tirumala. The images circumambulate the shrine of Venkateshvara on seven different vahanas. Due to this reason, the day of Ratha Saptami is regarded to be a minor brahmotsavam in Tirumala.

== See also ==
Other Sun festivals

- Makara Sankranti
- Pongal
- Chhath
