= Manda Chiranjeevi Das =

Indian academician

Manda Chiranjeevi Das, also known as MC Das, is an academician and theatre artiste from Andhra Pradesh. He was a retired professor from Andhra Loyola College and a management consultant.

== Early life and education ==
Das was born in Arasavalli, Srikakulam district. He did his schooling at the Municipal High School, Srikakulam. After finishing his graduation in commerce at the Government Arts College, Srikakulam in 1967, he also completed his M.Com. Later, he did his PhD at Andhra University on Management of Civic Amenities, A case study of Vijayawada Municipal Corporation in 1966. He also serves as a visiting professor at Acharya Nagarjuna University, Krishna University and KL University.

== Career ==
Das joined as a lecturer in 1970, in the commerce department of the Andhra Loyola College and then became a professor and head of the department after the college started post graduate courses. He also served as the first Academic Officer of the University of Health Sciences in Vijayawada in 1986.

In December 2024, he received a gold medal for topping the LLB batch at the XIV convocation of KL (deemed to be) University from the governor of Andhra Pradesh. He is an active Rotarian in Vijayawada and a motivational speaker.
