= Samba Dashami =

Festival in Odisha, India

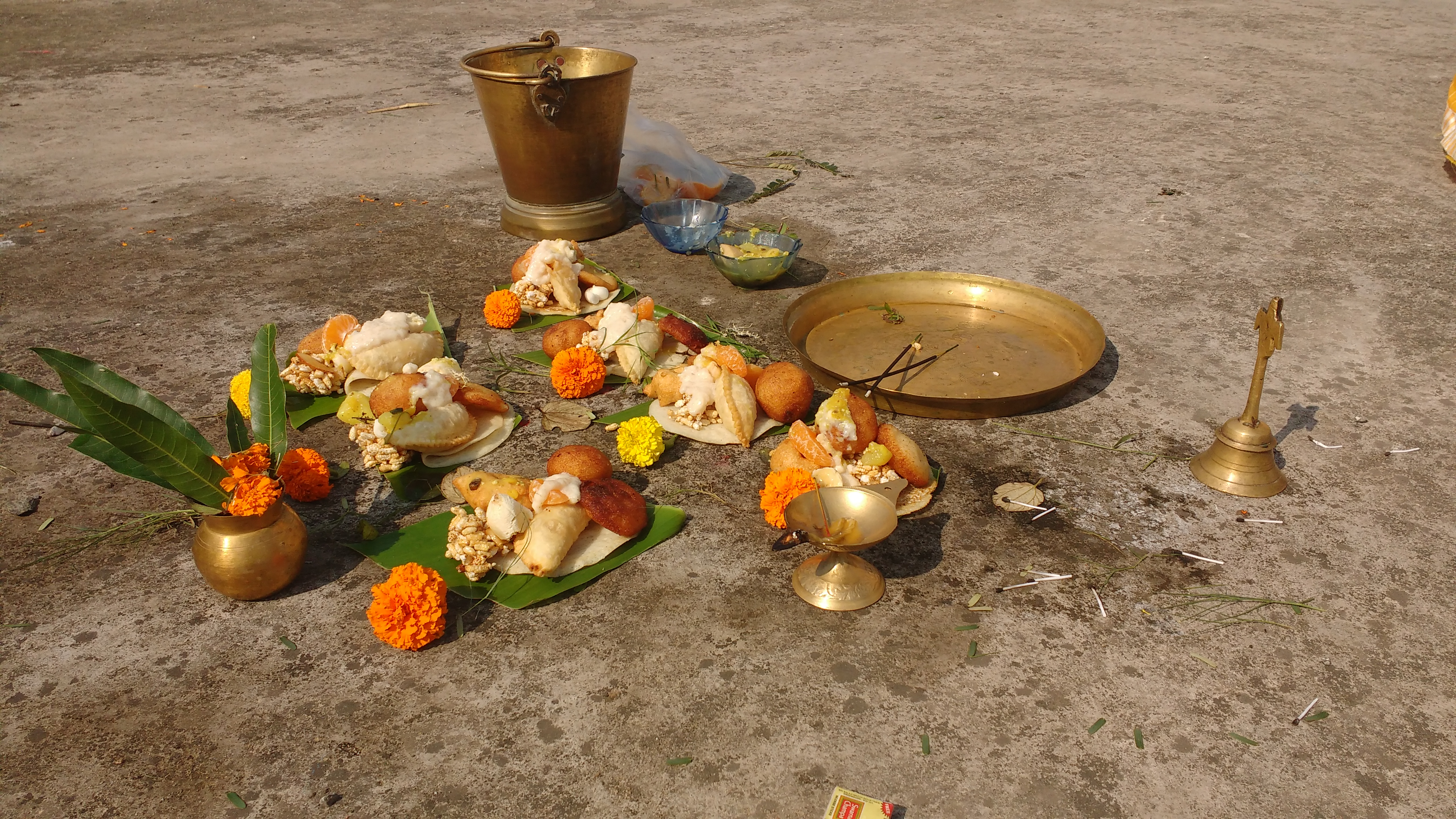
- Samba Dashami
- Also called: Surjya Puja
- Observed by: Hindus
- Type: Hindu
- Date: Pausha 25
- 2025 date: 8 January
- 2026 date: 29 December
- 2027 date: 16 January
- Frequency: Annual

Explanatory note on Hindu festival dates
- The Hindu calendar is lunisolar but most festival dates are specified using the lunar portion of the calendar. A lunar day is uniquely identified by three calendar elements: māsa (lunar month), pakṣa (lunar fortnight) and tithi (lunar day). Furthermore, when specifying the masa, one of two traditions are applicable, viz. amānta / pūrṇimānta. If a festival falls in the waning phase of the moon, these two traditions identify the same lunar day as falling in two different (but successive) masa. A lunar year is shorter than a solar year by about eleven days. As a result, most Hindu festivals occur on different days in successive years on the Gregorian calendar.

Samba Dashami is a festival unique to the state of Odisha, India. It is celebrated on the 10th day of the Shukla Paksha of Pausha Māsa or waxing phase of moon in the month of Pausha (December – January) as per traditional Odia calendar. This festival is especially celebrated in the eastern part of Odisha.

== Tradition ==
According to legend, Samba, son of Krishna, was afflicted by leprosy and was cured by the Sun God Surya after 12 years of penance near Konark. On this day, mothers pray to Surya for the health of their children.

== Rituals ==
On the day of Samba Dashami, the women in the family wake before sunrise. After bathing they prepare dishes such as khichdi, Odia puri, and ghadghadia tarkari (a curry), and offer them to Surya at sunrise. One of the specific characters of this ritual is variety of individual food item is offered to Sun God in the name of each member of the family, especially children. Once the food items have been offered to the Surya, the women prepare a set of cake-like dishes called pitha (cake), which includes manda pitha, kakara pitha, poda pitha, arisha pitha, biri laddoo, makar chaula, chhenaguda, dhanu muaan, khiri, rasagulla, jhilli, chhenagaja, and sweet curd.

At noon, a bowl of turmeric water with betel in it is taken to chaunra mula (a small temple-like structure with a tulsi plant overhead). All the cooked food is served on plates. The women in the family view Surya through the bowl of turmeric water and offer all the dishes to Surya. They read the legend of Samba Dasami Brata Katha and pray for the well-being of all family members.

In the evening, another puja is observed as a part of the Samba Dashami ritual. This is the Mahakala puja, in which special budha chakuli is offered to Yama.

== See also ==
- Biranchi Narayan Sun Temple
- Konark
