= Biranchinarayan Temple, Buguda =

Hindu temple of the sun-god Surya in Buguda, India

Coordinates: 19.808820°N 84.794202°E

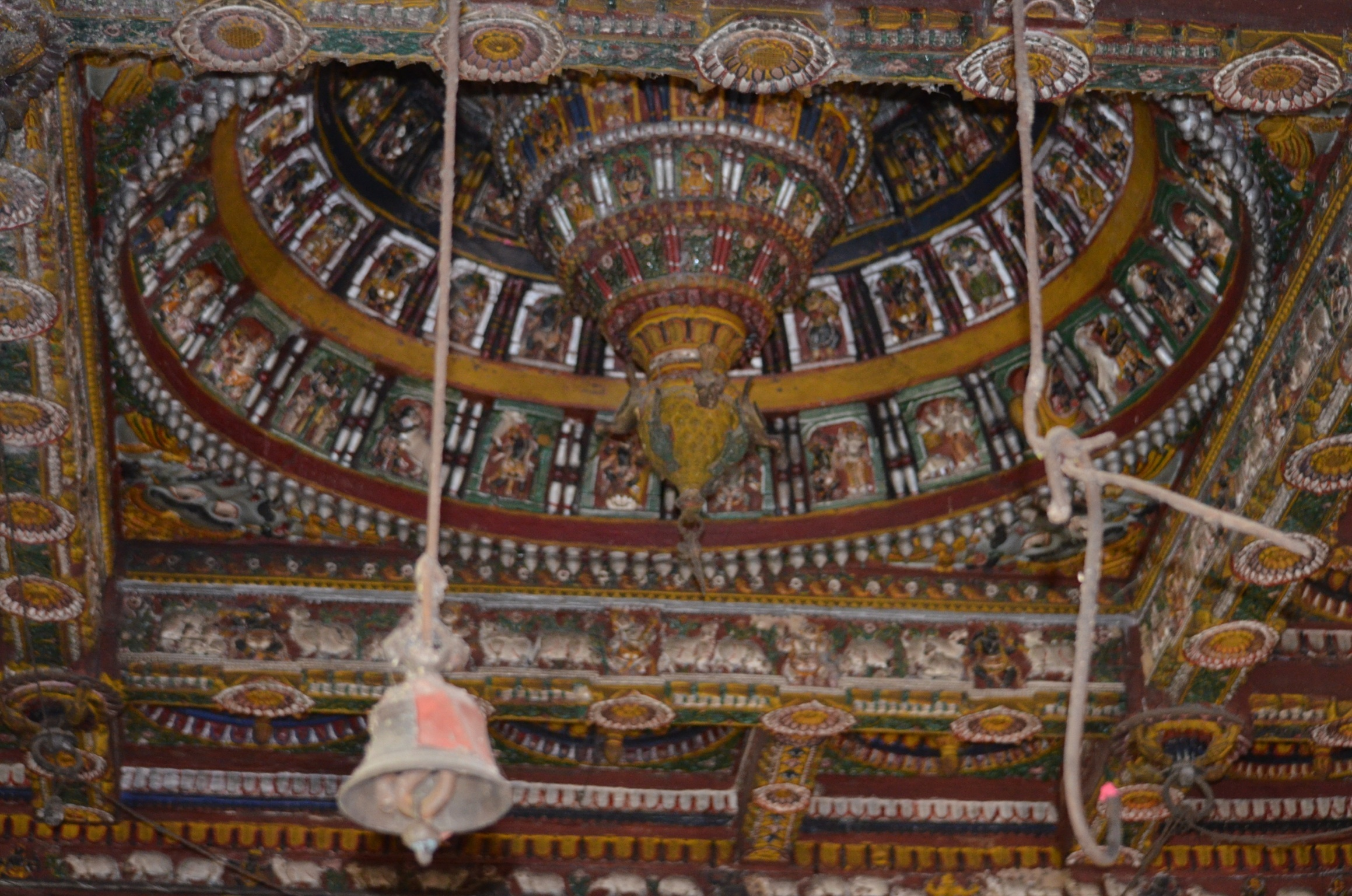
Wooden carvings in the Biranchinarayan Temple

The Biranchi Narayan Sun Temple, also known as the Abode of Viranchinarayana or the Wooden Konark, is a Hindu Temple located in the town of Buguda in Ganjam, Odisha. It is the second Surya temple constructed in Odisha, after the famous Konark Sun Temple.

== Construction ==
The temple was renovated by King Srikara Bhanjadeva in 1790. The presiding deity at the temple is Biranchi Narayan or Surya in the combination of Hindu trinity, whose image was recovered from ruins at Maltigad. The imagery also features a chariot driven by seven horses with one wheel on its left side, with Aruṇa as the chariot's driver.

The roof of the temple is constructed on a total of 46 pillars and contains intricate wood designs. Unlike the Konark temple, which faces east, the Birachi Narayan Sun Temple faces west. Consequently, while at Konark sun rays of the rising sun shine on the installed Surya, at the Biranchi Narayan Temple the rays of the setting sun fall on Surya's feet.

The Biranchi Narayan Sun Temple, renovated in 1790 by King Srikara Bhanjadeva, houses the presiding deity Biranchi Narayan (Surya) in a unique representation of the Hindu trinity. The temple's roof, supported by 46 pillars adorned with intricate wood designs, showcases distinctive imagery, including a chariot with seven horses and Aruṇa as the charioteer. In contrast to the east-facing Konark temple, the Biranchi Narayan Temple faces west, allowing the setting sun's rays to illuminate Surya's feet.

=== Wooden Konark ===
As per the desire of the king, the main God icon of the temple is made of wood. According to a legend, the stone image of the Surya is constructed off the main wooden image of Lord Surya.

== Festivals ==
- Ratha Saptami, during the month of Maagha
- Samba Dashami, during the month of Pausha
- Every Sunday, Sankranti.
