= Surya =

Solar deity in Hinduism

- God of the Sun; Ruler of the Planets; Para Brahman, the Supreme Being (Saura)
- Member of Navagraha
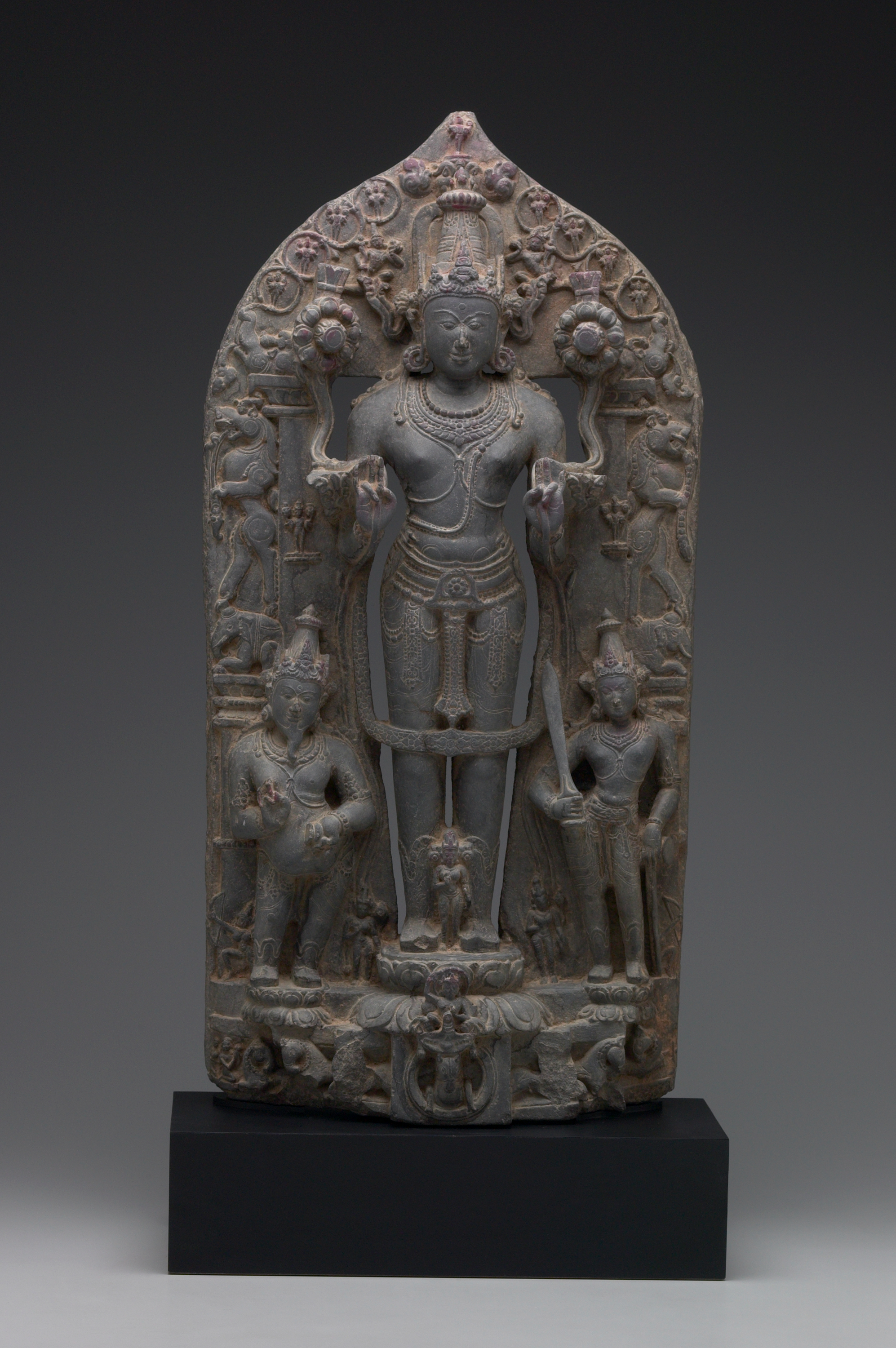
- Sculpture of Surya with attendants, c. 11th century
- Other names: Aditya; Vivasvat; Martanda; Savitr; Bhaskara; Bhanu; Divakara; Suryanarayana; Ravi; Kathiravan; Prabhakara
- Affiliation: Deva; Adityas; Ashtamurti; Navagraha
- Abode: Suryaloka
- Planet: Sun
- Mantra: Gayatri Mantra; Oṃ ādityāya namo namaḥ; Oṃ sūryadevāya namaḥ
- Weapon: Suryastra; Astras; Wand; Trisula; Chakra; Gada; Shankha
- Day: Sunday
- Number: 1
- Mount: Chariot pulled by seven horses Charioteer: Aruṇa
- Texts: Samba Panchashika, Saura Samhita, Samba Purana, Saura Purana, Markandeya Purana, Bhavishya Purana
- Festivals: Pongal, Sankranti, Chhath, Samba Dashami

Genealogy
- Parents: Kashyapa (father); Aditi (mother)
- Siblings: Adityas including: Indra; Varuna; Vamana; Bhaga; Aaryaman; Mitra; Chhathi
- Consorts: Sanjna and Chhaya (Note: The number of Surya's wives varies across different scriptures. Typically, he is shown with two wives—Sanjna and Chhaya—but some texts also include others such as Rajni, Prabha, Nikshubha, Mahashveta, and Ushas.)
- Children: Vaivasvata Manu (son); Yama (son); Yamuna (daughter); Ashvins (twin-sons); Revanta (son); Shani (son); Tapati (daughter); Savarni Manu (son); Sugriva (son); Karna (son)

Surya (/ˈsuːriə/ SOO-ree-ə; Sanskrit: सूर्य, IAST: Sūrya) is the Sun as well as the solar deity in Hinduism. He is traditionally one of the major five deities in the Smarta tradition, all of whom are considered as equivalent deities in the Panchayatana puja and a means to realise Brahman. Throughout Indian literature, Surya has been given multiple epitaphs such as Ravi, Vivasvān, Bhāskara, etc. Furthermore, Surya has been described through aspects of itself which are identified as the Ādityas; including Savitr, Pushan, Mārtanda, Bhaga, etc.

Personification of Lord Suryanarayana on Chhath Puja at Jesal Chowpatty, Bhayandar near Mumbai.

The iconography of Surya is often depicted riding a chariot harnessed by horses, often seven in number which represent the seven colours of visible light, and the seven days of the week. During the medieval period, Surya was worshipped in tandem with Brahma during the day, Vishnu at noon, and Shiva in the evening. In some ancient texts and art, Surya is presented syncretically with Indra, Ganesha, and others. Surya as a deity is also found in the arts and literature of Buddhism and Jainism. Surya is also regarded as the father of Sugriva and Karna, who play important roles in the two Hindu epics—the Ramayana and the Mahabharata, respectively. Surya was a primary deity in veneration by the characters of the Mahabharata and Ramayana.

Surya is depicted with a Chakra, also interpreted as Dharmachakra. Surya is the lord of Simha (Leo), one of the twelve constellations in the zodiac system of Hindu astrology. Surya or Ravi is the basis of Ravivara, or Sunday, in the Hindu calendar. Major festivals and pilgrimages in reverence for Surya include Makar Sankranti, Pongal, Samba Dashami, Ratha Saptami, Chath puja, and Kumbha Mela.

He is particularly venerated in the Saura and Smarta traditions found in Indian states such as Rajasthan, Gujarat, Madhya Pradesh, Bihar, Maharashtra, Uttar Pradesh, Jharkhand, and Odisha.

Having survived as a primary deity in Hinduism longer than most of the original Vedic deities, the worship of Surya declined greatly around the 13th century, perhaps as a result of the Muslim destruction of Sun temples in North India. New Sun temples virtually ceased to be built, and some were later repurposed to a different deity. A number of important Surya temples remain, but most are no longer in worship. In certain aspects, Surya has tended to be merged with the prominent deities of Vishnu or Shiva, or seen as subsidiary to them.

== Texts and history ==
=== Vedic ===
The Sun and the Earth

The Sun causes day and night on the earth,
because of revolution,
when there is night here, it is day on the other side,
the sun does not really rise or sink.

— Aitareya Brahmana III.44 (Rigveda)

The oldest surviving Vedic hymns, such as the hymn 1.115 of the Rigveda, mention Sūrya with particular reverence for the "rising sun" and its symbolism as dispeller of darkness, one who empowers knowledge, the good and all life. However, the usage is context specific. In some hymns, the word Surya simply means Sun as an inanimate object, a stone or a gem in the sky (Rigvedic hymns 5.47, 6.51 and 7.63); while in others it refers to a personified deity. Surya is prominently associated with the dawn goddess Ushas and sometimes, he is mentioned as her son or her husband.

Surya's origin differs heavily in the Rigveda, with him being stated to have been born, risen, or established by a number of deities, including the Ādityas, Aditi, Dyaush, Mitra-Varuna, Agni, Indra, Soma, Indra-Soma, Indra-Varuna, Indra-Vishnu, Purusha, Dhatri, the Angirases, and the gods in general. The Atharvaveda also mentions that Surya originated from Vritra.

The Vedas assert Sun (Surya) to be the creator of the material universe (Prakriti). In the layers of Vedic texts, Surya is one of the several trinities along with Agni and either Vayu or Indra, which are presented as an equivalent icon and aspect of the Hindu metaphysical concept called the Brahman.

In the Brahmanas layer of Vedic literature, Surya appears with Agni (fire god) in the same hymns. Surya is revered for the day, while Agni for its role during the night. The idea evolves, states Kapila Vatsyayan, where Surya is stated to be Agni as the first principle and the seed of the universe. It is in the Brahmanas layer of the Vedas, and the Upanishads that Surya is explicitly linked to the power of sight, to visual perception and knowledge. He is then interiorized to be the eye as ancient Hindu sages suggested abandonment of external rituals to gods in favor of internal reflections and meditation of gods within, in one's journey to realize the Atman (soul, self) within, in texts such as the Brihadaranyaka Upanishad, Chandogya Upanishad, Kaushitaki Upanishad and others.

==== Conflation with other solar deities ====
Surya in Indian literature is referred to by various names, which typically represent different aspects or phenomenological characteristics of the Sun. The figure of Surya as we know him today is an amalgamation of various different Rigvedic deities. Thus, Savitr refers to one that rises and sets, Aditya means one with splendor, Mitra refers to Sun as "the great luminous friend of all mankind", while Pushan refers to Sun as illuminator that helped the Devas win over Asuras who use darkness. Arka, Mitra, Vivasvat, Aditya, Tapan, Ravi and Surya have different characteristics in early mythologies, but by the time of the epics they are synonymous.

The term "Arka" is found more commonly in temple names of north India and in the eastern parts of India. The 11th century Konark Temple in Odisha is named after a composite word "Kona and Arka", or "Arka in the corner". Other Surya temples named after Arka include Devarka (Deva teertha) and Ularka (Ulaar) in Bihar, Uttararka and Lolarka in Uttar Pradesh, and Balarka in Rajasthan. Another 10th-century sun temple ruin is in Bahraich, Uttar Pradesh named Balarka Surya Mandir, which was destroyed in the 14th century during the Turkish invasions.

Vivasvat, also known as Vivasvant, is also one such of these deities. His wife is Saranyu, daughter of Tvashtar. His sons include the Ashvins, Yama, and Manu. Through Manu, Vivasvat is considered an ancestor of humanity. Vivasvat is affiliated with Agni and Matarishvan, with Agni being stated to have been first revealed to those two. Vivasvat is also variously related to Indra, Soma, and Varuna. Vivasvant is also used as an adjective of Agni and Ushas to mean "brilliant". Already by the time of his earliest appearance (the Rigveda), Vivasvat had declined in importance. He was likely a solar deity, but scholars debate his specific role as one. In the Rigveda, Indra drinks Soma alongside Manu Vivasvat and Trita. In post-Vedic literature, Vivasvat further declines in importance, and is merely another name for the sun. He is cognate to the Avestan Vivanhvant, who is the father of Yima (cognate to Yama) and Manu. Taittiriya Aranyaka, in Prapataka (section) 6, provides the methods of meditating on Surya.

=== Epics ===
As per the Ramayana's Yuddha Kanda, Rama was taught the Ādityahṛdayam stotra before his war against Ravana, the king of the rakshasas. The stotra was composed in Anushtup Chanda in praise of Surya, who is described as the embodiment of all gods and the origin of everything in the universe.

The Mahabharata epic opens its chapter on Surya that reverentially calls him as the "eye of the universe, soul of all existence, origin of all life, goal of the Samkhyas and Yogis, and symbolism for freedom and spiritual emancipation.

In the Mahabharata, Karna is the son of Surya and unmarried princess Kunti. The epic describes Kunti's trauma as an unmarried mother, then abandonment of Karna, followed by her lifelong grief. Baby Karna is found and adopted by a charioteer but he grows up to become the greatest warrior and one of the central heroes of the great war of Kurukshetra.

== Iconography ==
=== Buddhism and Jainism ===
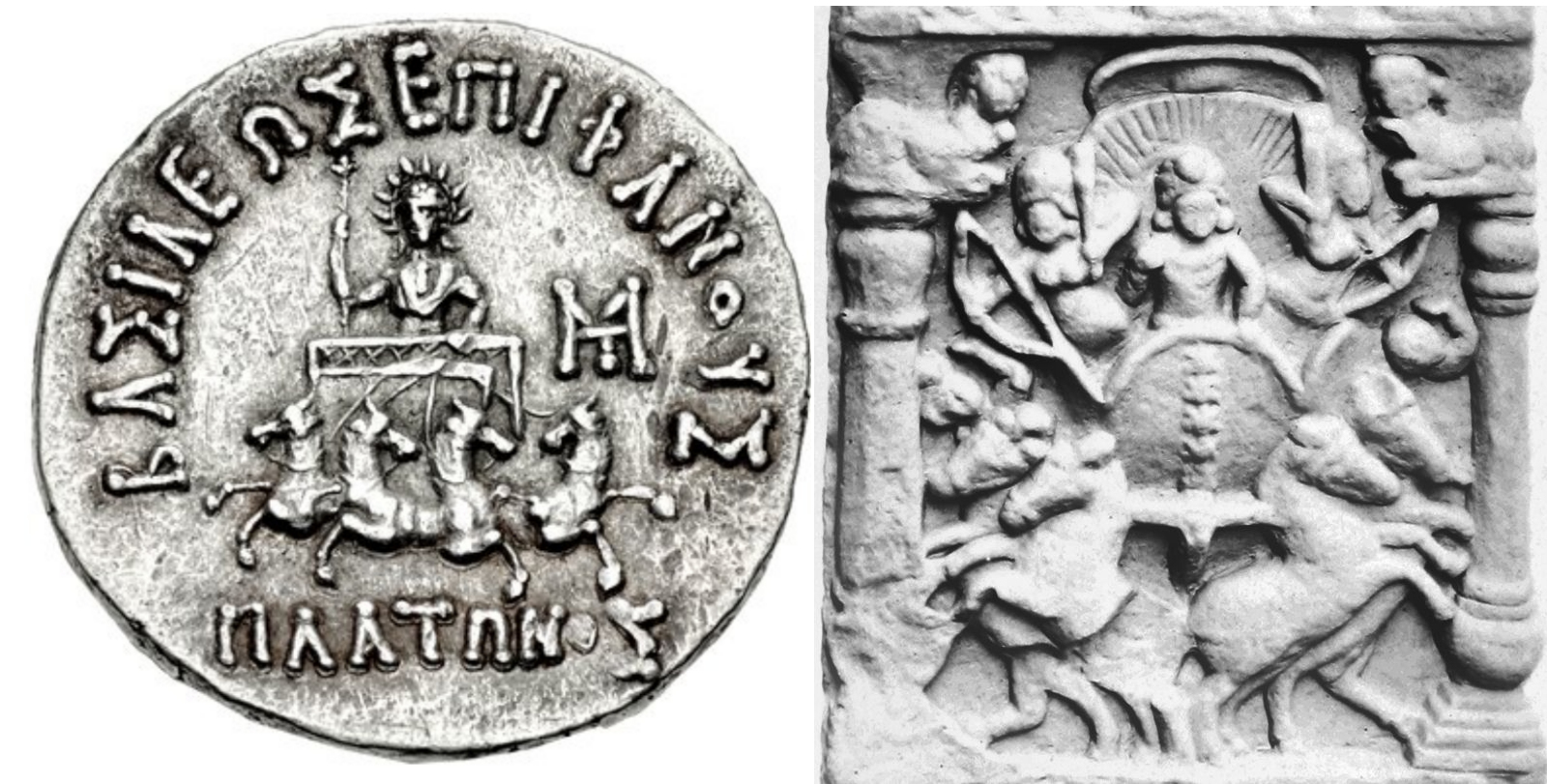
A Hellenistic coin of Plato of Bactria (145–130 BCE) with the sun god Helios (left), and depiction of Surya in a Buddhist relief at Bodh Gaya (2nd century BCE), its earliest known depiction in India (right).

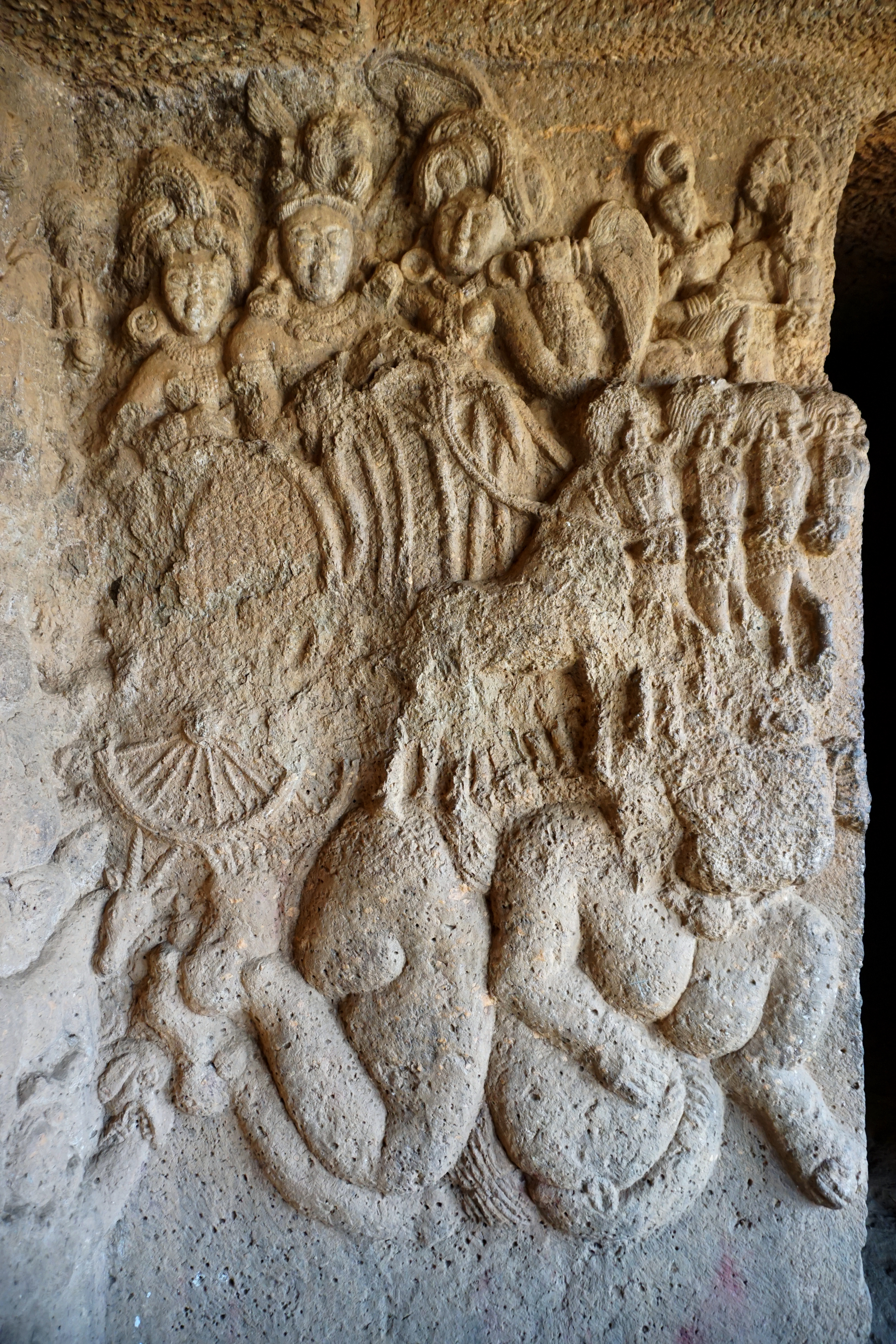
Surya on his charriot with horses, Bhaja Caves (1st cent BCE).

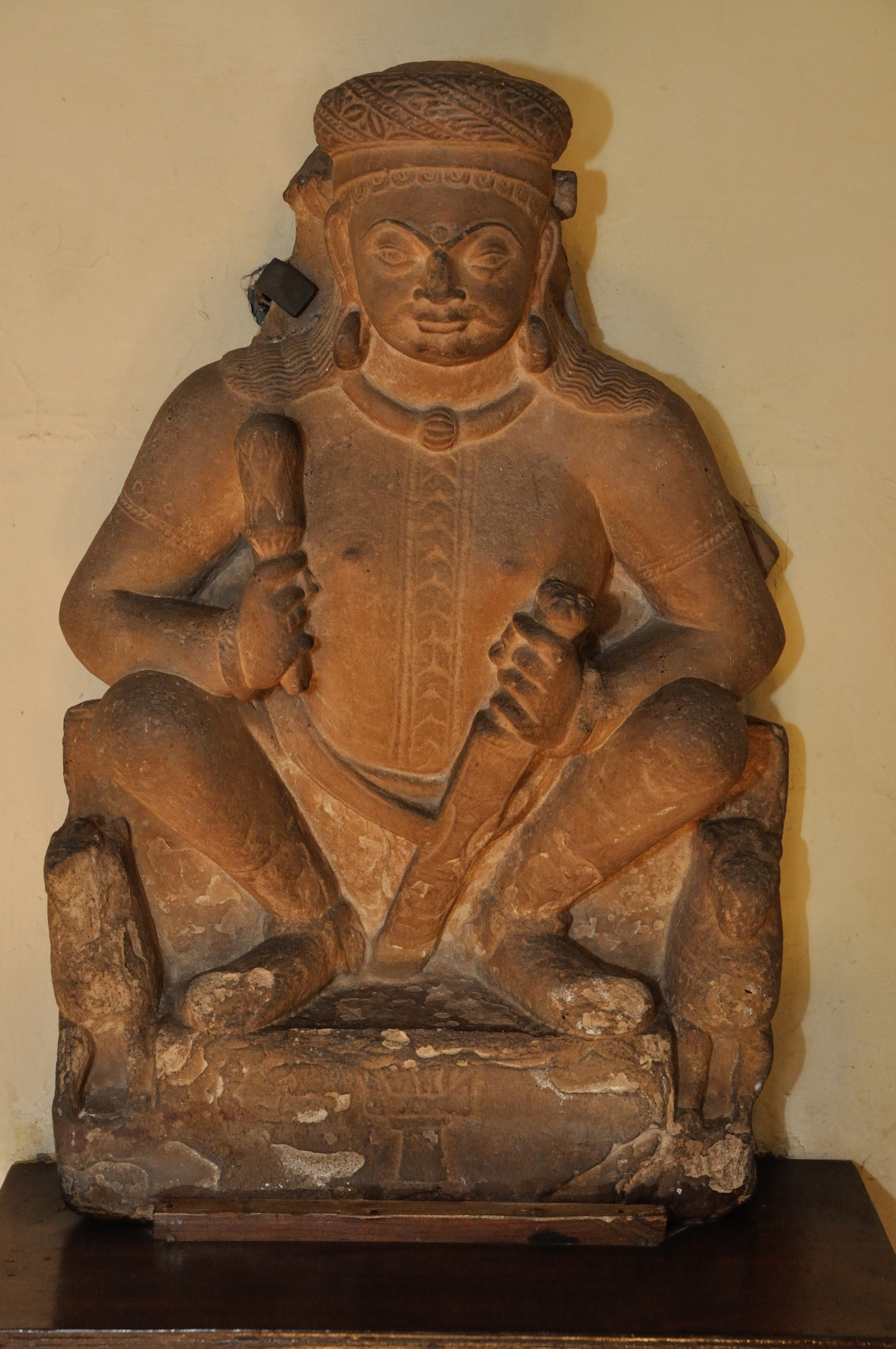
A Surya of the Kushan period, in northern clothing. 2nd–3rd century CE, Art of Mathura.

Earliest representations of Surya riding a chariot occur in the Buddhist railings of the Mahabodhi temple in Bodhgaya (2nd century BCE), in the Bhaja Caves (1st century BCE), and the Jain cave of Ananta Gumpha in Khandagiri (1st century CE). They follow similar depiction of the chariot-riding god Helios of Hellenistic mythology, as appearing for example on the coinage of Greco-Bactrian kings, such as Plato I.

The iconography of Surya has varied over time. In some ancient arts, particularly from the early centuries of the common era, his iconography is similar to those found in Persia and Greece suggesting likely adoption of Greek, Iranian and Scythian influences. After the Greek and Kushan influences arrived in ancient India, some Surya icons of the period that followed show him wearing a cloak and high boots. In some Buddhist artwork, his chariot is shown as being pulled by four horses. The doors of Buddhist monasteries of Nepal show him, along with the Chandra (moon god), symbolically with Surya depicted as a red circle with rays.

=== Hinduism ===
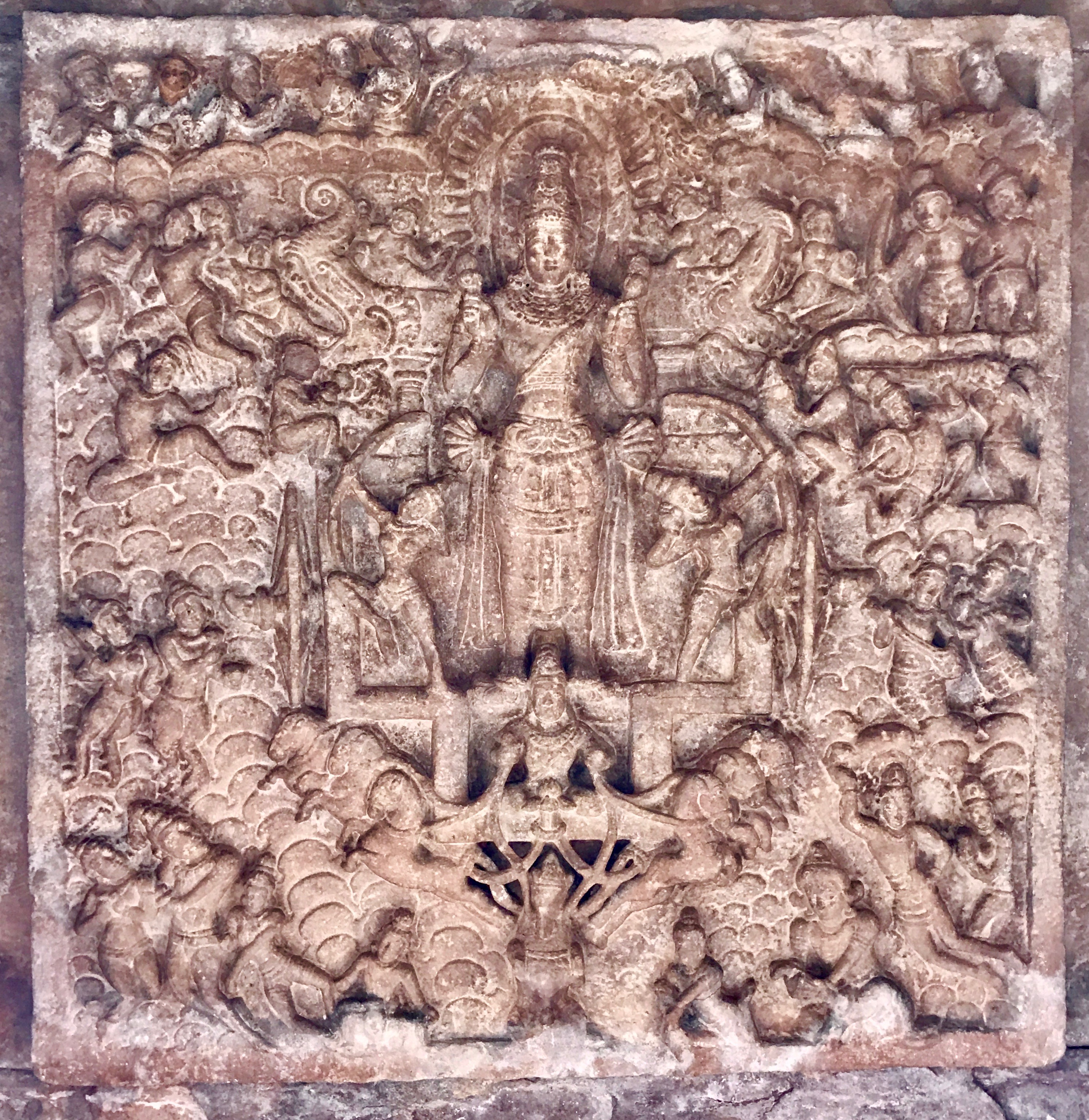
One of the first depictions of Surya in a Hindu context, in the Virūpākṣa temple in Paṭṭadakal (8th century CE).

In Hindu context, the sun-god only appears at a later period, as in the Virūpākṣa temple in Paṭṭadakal (8th century CE). The iconography of Surya in Hinduism varies with its texts. He is typically shown as a resplendent standing person holding a lotus flower in both hands, riding a chariot pulled by one or more horses typically seven. The seven horses are named after the seven meters of Sanskrit prosody: Gayatri, Brihati, Ushnih, Jagati, Trishtubha, Anushtubha and Pankti.

The Brihat Samhita of Varaha Mihira (c. 505–587), a Hindu text that describes architecture, iconography and design guidelines, states that Surya should be shown with two hands and wearing a crown. It specifically describes his dress to be Northern (i.e. Central Asian, with boots). In contrast, the Vishnudharmottara, another Hindu text on architecture, states Surya iconography should show him with four hands, with flowers in two hands, a staff in third, and in fourth he should be shown to be holding writing equipment (Kundi palm leaf and pen symbolizing knowledge). His chariot driver in both books is stated to be Aruṇa who is seated. Two females typically flank him, who represent the dawn goddesses named Usha and Pratyusha. The goddesses are shown to be shooting arrows, a symbolism for their initiative to challenge darkness. In other representations, these goddesses are Surya's two wives, Samjna and Chhaya. He had two other wives according to some texts, Rajni and Prabha.

Aniconic symbols of Surya include the Swastika and the ring-stone. In various texts including Mahabharata, Suryasataka, or Prasasti of Vatsabhatti, Surya is depicted as being worshipped by a host of semi-divine beings. These beings, namely Siddhas, Charanas, Gandharvas, Yaksas, Guhyakas, and the Nagas, desirous of obtaining boons, follow the course of Surya's chariot through the sky.

== Astronomy ==
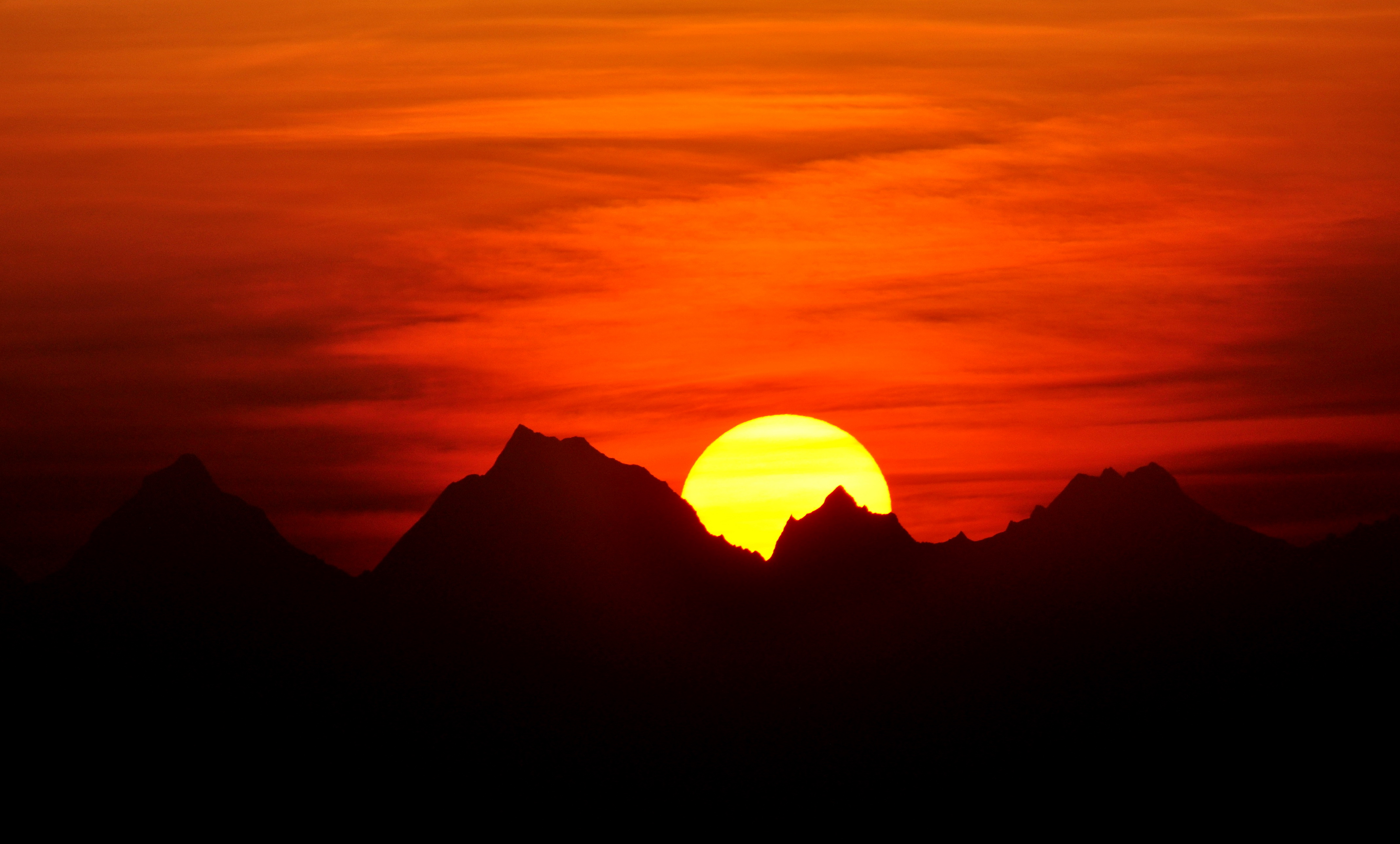
Surya means Sun in Indic literature. Above: Sunrise in Uttarakhand, India

Surya as an important heavenly body appears in various Indian astronomical texts in Sanskrit, such as the 5th century Aryabhatiya by Aryabhata, the 6th century Romaka by Latadeva and Panca Siddhantika by Varahamihira, the 7th century Khandakhadyaka by Brahmagupta and the 8th century Sisyadhivrddida by Lalla. These texts present Surya and various planets and estimate the characteristics of the respective planetary motion. Other texts such as Surya Siddhanta dated to have been complete sometime between the 5th century and 10th century present their chapters on various planets with deity mythologies.

The manuscripts of these texts exist in slightly different versions, present Surya- and planets-based calculation and its relative motion to Earth. These vary in their data, suggesting that the text were open and revised over their lives. For example, the 10th century BCE Hindu scholars had estimated the sidereal length of a year as follows, from their astronomical studies, with slightly different results:

Sanskrit texts: How many days in a year?
Hindu text	Estimated length of the sidereal year
Surya Siddhanta	365 days, 6 hours, 12 minutes, 36.56 seconds
Paulica Siddhanta	365 days, 6 hours, 12 minutes, 36 seconds
Paracara Siddhanta	365 days, 6 hours, 12 minutes, 31.50 seconds
Arya Siddhanta	365 days, 6 hours, 12 minutes, 30.84 seconds
Laghu Arya Siddhanta	365 days, 6 hours, 12 minutes, 30 seconds
Siddhanta Shiromani	365 days, 6 hours, 12 minutes, 9 seconds

The oldest of these is likely to be the Surya Siddhanta, while the most accurate is the Siddhanta Shiromani.

=== Zodiac and astrology ===
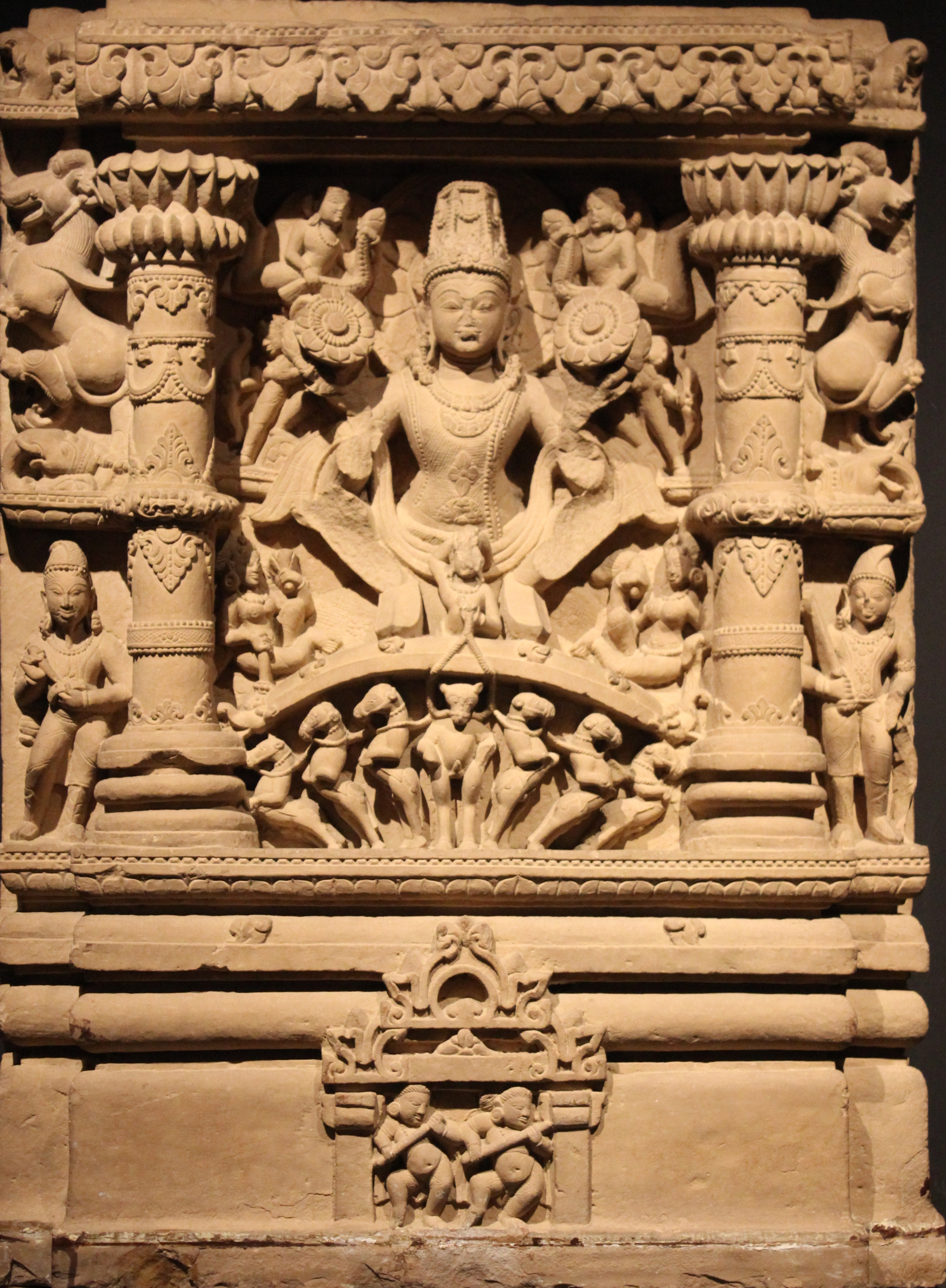
Surya (center) is typically depicted holding lotus flowers and riding in a horse-drawn chariot. He is accompanied by his wives (bottom female figures) and children (other male figures). The dawn goddesses (top female figures) are depicted shooting arrows. Circa 9th century CE.

Surya's synonym Ravi is the root of the word 'Ravivara' or Sunday in the Hindu calendar. In both Indian and Greek-Roman nomenclature for days of the week, the Sunday is dedicated to the Sun.

Surya is a part of the Navagraha in Hindu zodiac system. The role and importance of the Navagraha developed over time with various influences. Deifying the sun and its astrological significance occurred as early as the Vedic period and was recorded in the Vedas. The earliest work of astrology recorded in India is the Vedanga Jyotisha which began to be compiled in the 14th century BCE. It was possibly based on works from the Indus Valley Civilization as well as various foreign influences. Babylonian astrology was the first to develop astrology and the calendar, and was adopted by multiple civilizations including India.

The Navagraha developed from early works of astrology over time. The Sun and various classical planets were referenced in the Atharvaveda around 1000 BCE. The Navagraha was furthered by additional contributions from Western Asia, including Zoroastrian and Hellenistic influences. The Yavanajataka, or 'Science of the Yavanas', was written by the Indo-Greek named "Yavanesvara" ("Lord of the Greeks") under the rule of the Western Kshatrapa king Rudrakarman I. The Yavanajataka written in 120 BCE is often attributed to standardizing Indian astrology. The Navagraha would further develop and culminate in the Shaka era with the Saka, or Scythian, people.

Additionally the contributions by the Saka people would be the basis of the Indian national calendar, which is also called the Saka calendar.

The Hindu calendar is a Lunisolar calendar which records both lunar and solar cycles. Like the Navagraha, it was developed with the successive contributions of various works.

== Temples and worship ==
Surya temples are found in many parts of India. More common than Surya temples are artwork related to Surya, which are found in all types of temples of various traditions within Hinduism, such as the Hindu temples related to Shiva, Vishnu, Ganesha, and Shakti. (Note: Meister (1986) pp 243 (with notes [35] and [36]), 252-254, 239-241) Reliefs on temple walls, forts and artwork above doorways of many Hindu monasteries feature Surya.

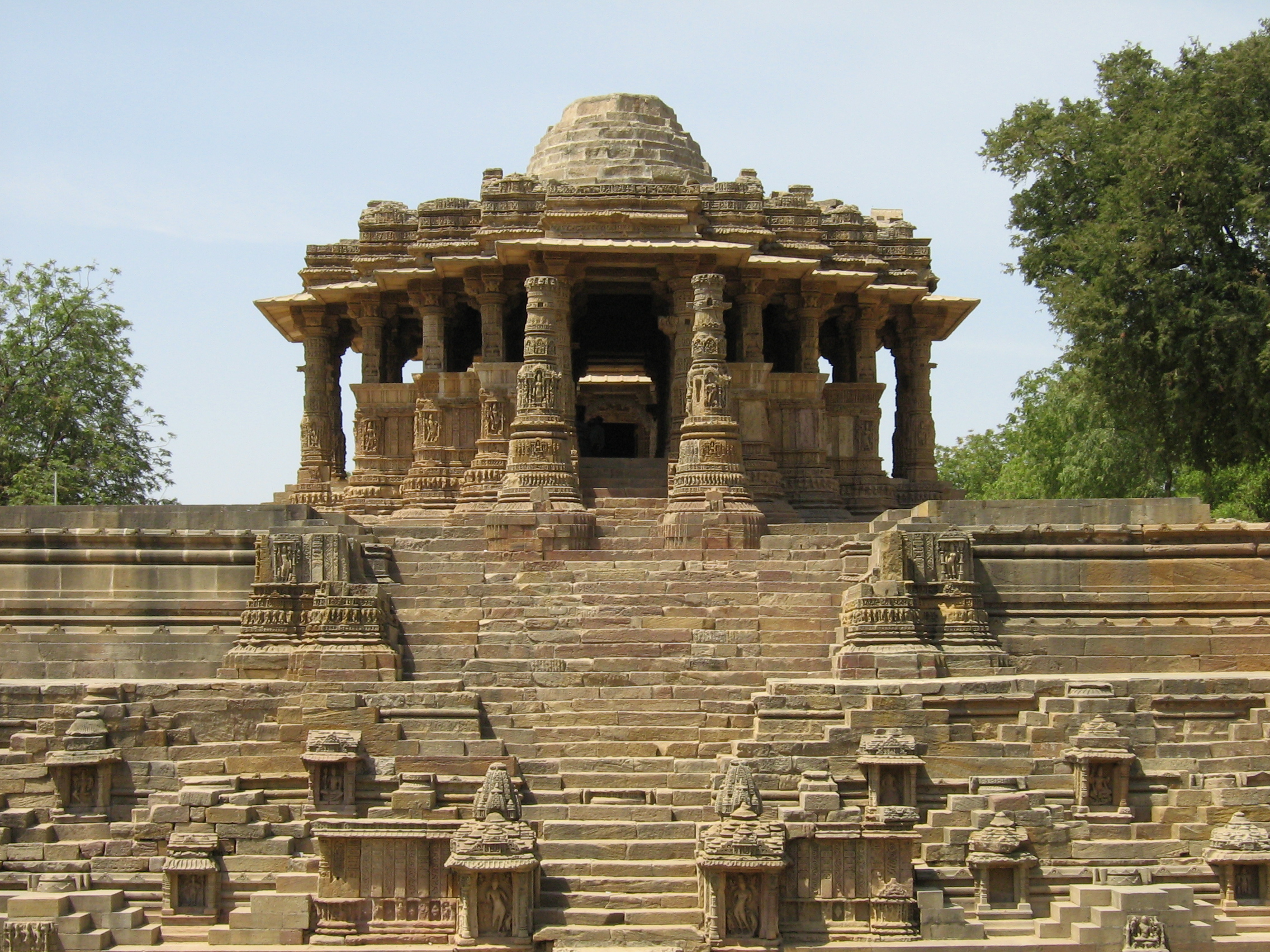
Sun Temple, Modhera

Many of the temples that contain Surya icons and artwork are dated to the second half of the 1st millennium BCE and early centuries of the 2nd millennium. The 11th-century Vaishnava temple at Kadwaha in Madhya Pradesh, for example, features a Surya artwork along with many other gods and goddesses at its doorway. The 8th and 9th century goddess (Shaktism) temples of central India, similarly engrave Surya along with other Hindu gods within the temple. The six century Shiva temple at Gangadhar in Rajasthan includes Surya. (Note: Meister (1986) pp 233–262) Similar mentions are found in stone inscriptions found near Hindu temples, such as the 5th century Mandasor inscription. These temples, states Michael Meister, do not glorify one god or goddess over the other, but present them independently and with equal emphasis in a complex iconography.

Cave temples of India, similarly, dedicated to different gods and goddesses feature Surya. For example, the 6th century carvings in the Ellora Caves in Maharashtra as well as the 8th and 9th century artworks there, such as Cave 25, the Kailasha Temple (Cave 16) and others feature complete iconography of Surya.

Hindu temples predominantly have their primary entrance facing east, and their square principle based architecture is reverentially aligned the direction of the rising Surya. This alignment towards the sunrise is also found in most Buddhist and Jaina temples in and outside of India.

=== Dedicated temples ===
A prominent temple dedicated to Surya can be found in Arasavalli, which is in the Srikakulam district of Andhra Pradesh, India. The coastal district temple is peculiar with its latitude aligned to the minor lunar standstill. Also the transition from lunar calendar of north India to solar calendar of south India can be seen in the local culture. This is probably the eastern most coastal sun temple in the peninsular India, where prayers are offered until date. The place, Chicacole, has a significance in the Kalinga (historical region) kingdom with their port at Kalingapatnam, making it to Megasthenes dairy (Calingae). The diaspora is spread in the present day south east Asia at historical Kalinga (province), Kalingga Kingdom etc.

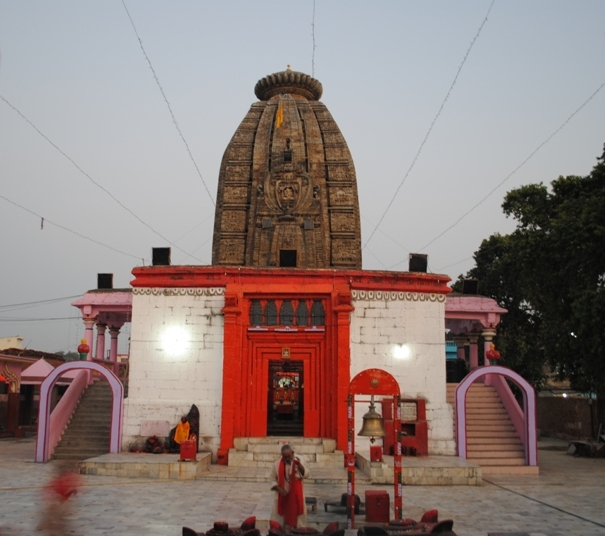
Deo Surya Mandir

Other most worshiped Surya temple is the Deo Surya Mandir. Sun Temple of Deo is one of the most remarkable, major crowd-puller and notable temple and religious place in Deo, Bihar, India for chhath puja. Deo Sun Temple Built in during the 8th century. Similarly in the Mithila region of Bihar, there is Kandaha Surya Mandir also known as Markandeyark Surya Mandir at Kandaha village in the Saharsa district dedicated to Lord Suryanarayana. It is believed to be built by Samba, the son of Krishna. In the Sitamarhi district of the Mithila region, there are two major Surya temples. They are Surya Mandir at Punauradham and Navagraha Surya Mandir at Mangaldham. In the Madhubani district, there is an ancient Surya temple known as Kamlark Surya Mandir at the campus of the Kamaladitya Sthan.

In Tamil Nadu, Navagraha temples are world famous. Suryanar kovil situated in Tanjore district of Tamil Nadu is one among the Navagraha temples and it is dedicated to Surya. Here lord Surya is called as Sivasurya Perumal. It is the first among the Navagraha temples of Tamil Nadu.

The most famous Surya temple is the Konark Sun Temple, a World Heritage Site in Orissa. Constructed in the 13th century by the Eastern Ganga dynasty, on a pre-existing pilgrimage site for Surya god, the temple architecture mimics a grand chariot with twelve wheels pulled by seven horses. The temple features Surya in three representations, with the main large Surya destroyed and the temple damaged over the course of repeated Muslim invasions. Besides Konark, there are two other sun temples in Orissa called Biranchi Narayan Sun Temple.

There are sun temples in many parts of India, such as Modhera, Gujarat. It was sponsored by King Bhimdev of the Chaulukya dynasty. Other major Surya temples are found in Kanakaditya Temple in Kasheli (Dist ratnagiri) – Maharashtra, near the famous Galtaji's temple in Jaipur, Rajasthan and Assam.

Adithyapuram Sun Temple is a Hindu temple located in Iravimangalam near Kaduthuruthy in Kottayam district in the Indian state of Kerala dedicated to Surya. It is noted as the only Surya shrine in the Kerala state.

The Martand Sun Temple in Jammu and Kashmir was destroyed by Islamic armies. A surviving Surya temple in northern India is Kattarmal Surya mandir in Almora District, Uttarakhand created by King Kattarmal in the 12th century.

The Indian rulers were essentially worshipers of the sun and some of the sun temples were erected by them during the medieval period. The sun temple known as Jayaditya was constructed by king of Nandipuri, Jayabhatta II. This temple is situated at Kotipura near Kapika in the Bharukachha district. The Surya temple of Bhinmal known as Jagaswami Surya temple was also erected during this period.

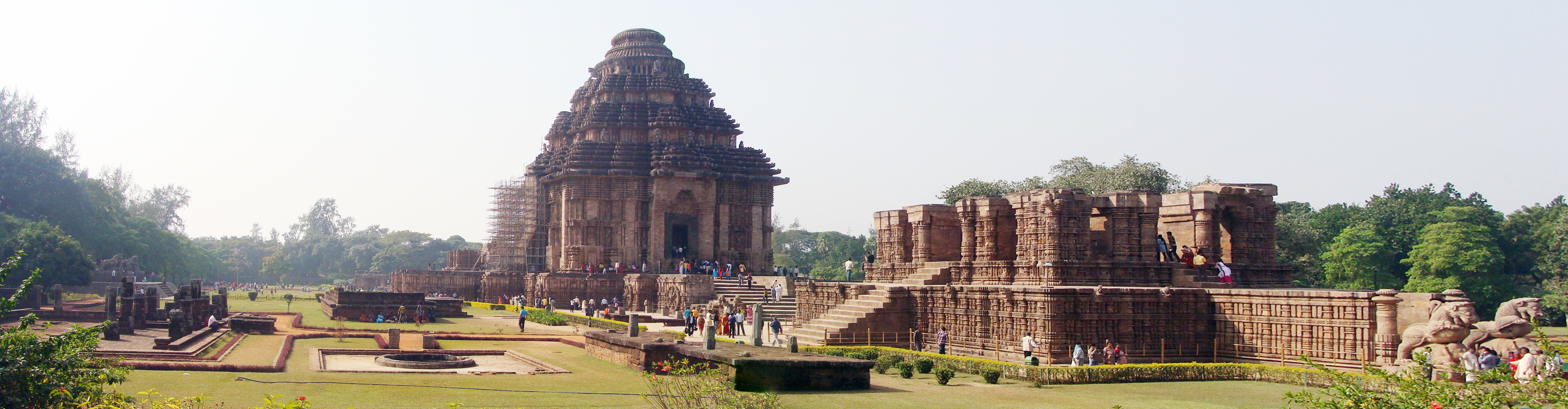
Konark Sun Temple Panoramic View

=== Surya temples outside India ===
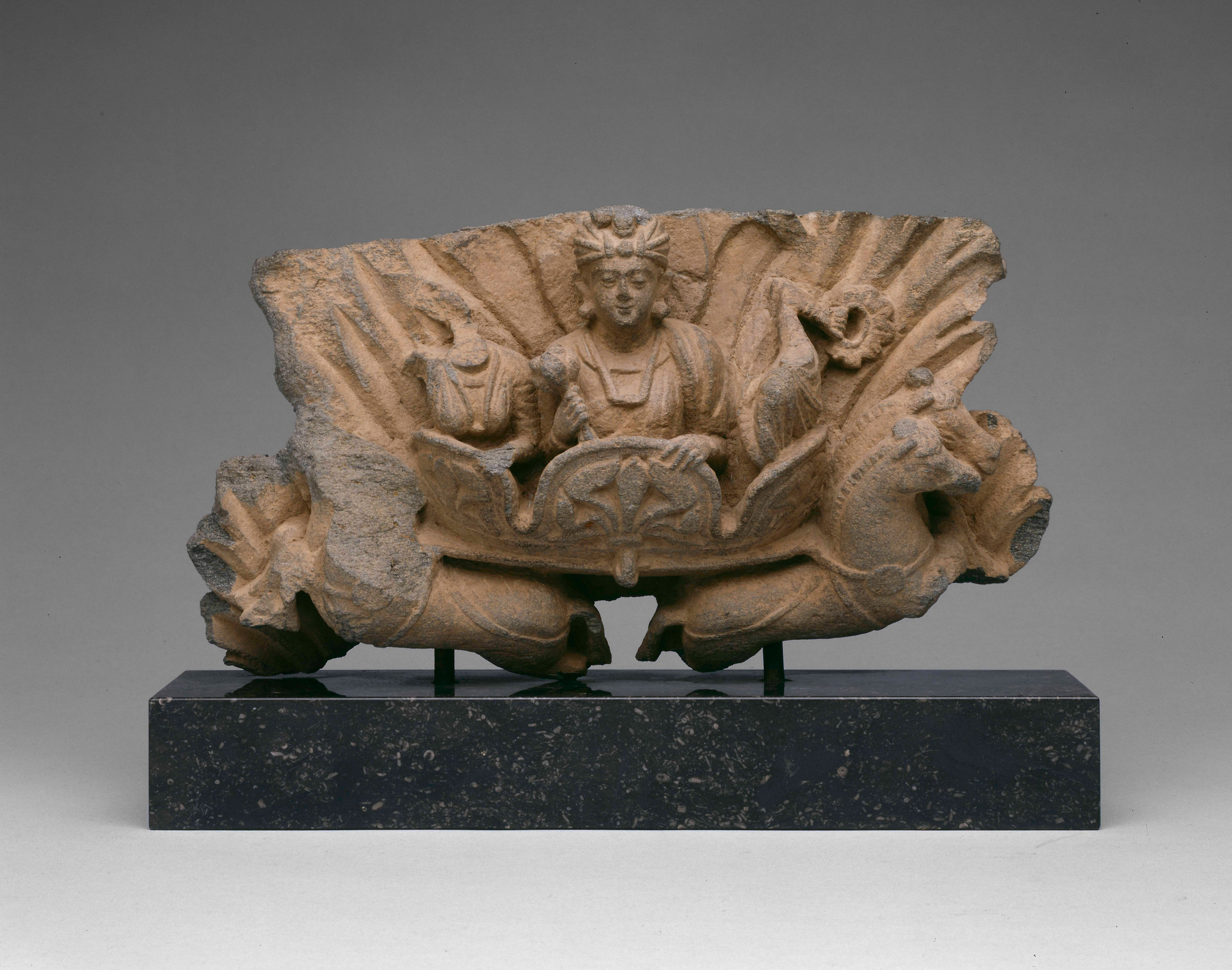
Indo-Corinthian capital featuring Surya. Gandhara, 2nd century CE.

The Sun Temple of Multan (in modern-day Pakistan) contained a revered statue of Surya. It was one of the focal points of Hindu-Muslim religious conflicts. After 871 BCE, Multan (Panjab) was under the rule by Arab princes, who kept the Surya temple hostage and desecrated it, in order to threaten its destruction if the Indian Hindu rulers attacked them. The early Muslim rulers taxed Hindu pilgrims for the privilege to visit the Surya temple, and this provided these rulers an important source of revenue. The Surya temple was destroyed by Ismaili Shia rulers in the late 10th century, who built a mosque atop the site, abandoning the Sunni jama masjid (congregational mosque) in Multan. This Ismaili Shia mosque atop the Sun Temple's ruins was then destroyed by the Sunni ruler Mahmud of Ghazni, the Surya temple was not rebuilt and an empty space left in place, actions that helped re-establish the importance of the Sunni mosque in Multan.

While Shiva and Vishnu are more common in 1st millennium southeast Asian artwork such as those found in Cambodia and Thailand, archaeological evidence suggest god Surya were among the pantheon of ideas adopted early in these regions and retained after Buddhism became the dominant tradition.

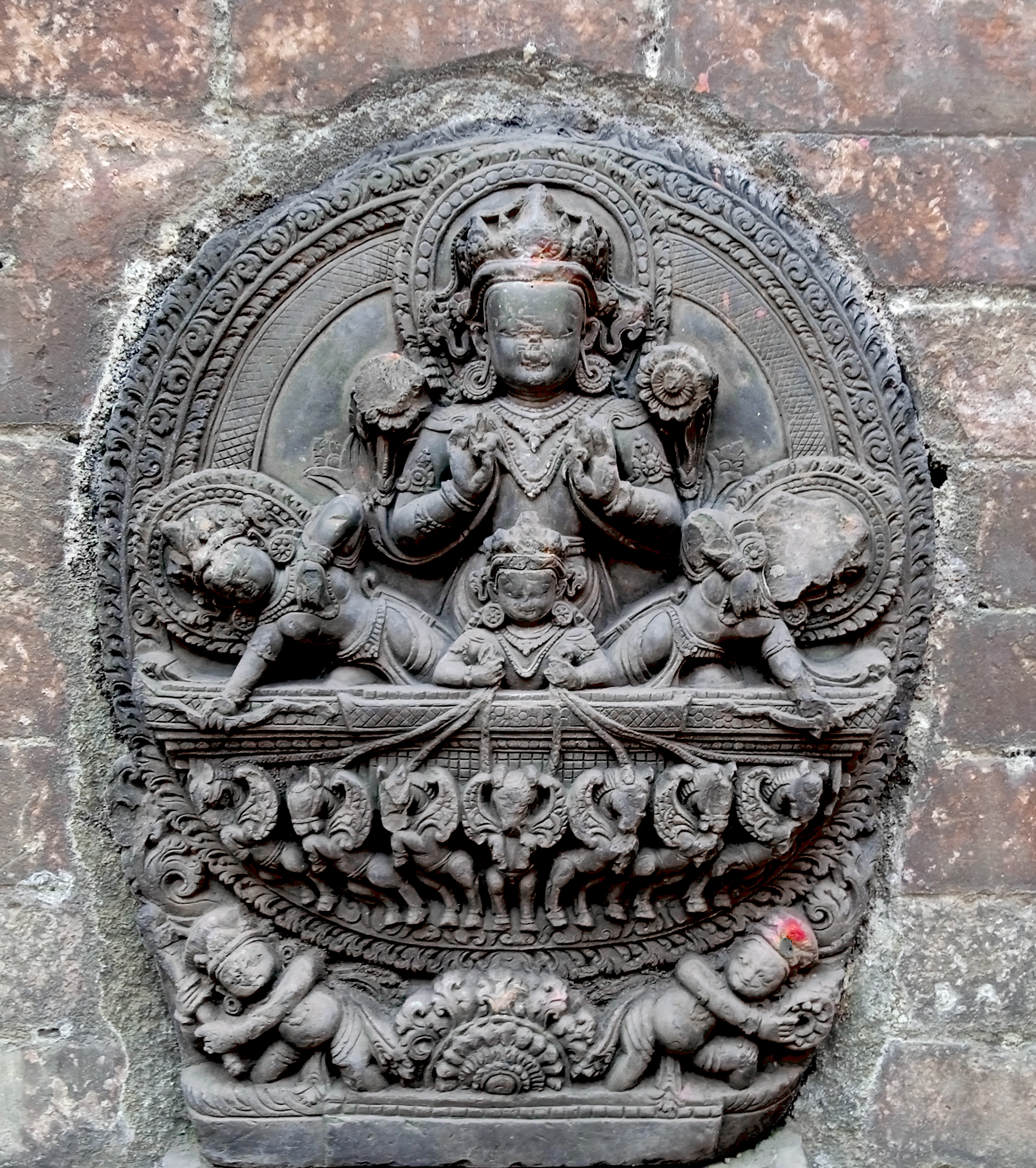
Nepalese stone sculpture depicting Surya

In Kabul Khair Khāna, there is a Hindu temple dedicated to Surya, of two distinct periods. The first period consisted of a mud-brick temple with possible human sacrifice remains dedicating it. This was then superseded by three distinct sanctuaries built of schist slabs, surrounded by subsidiary buildings of diaper masonry construction and an open-air altar in a semi-circular enclosure. The most important finds were two marble statues of Surya, the first example found during the original excavations (1934, Delegation Archaeologique Française Afghanistan), the second example found by accident in 1980.

In Nepal, many Surya temples and artworks trace to the medieval era, such as the 11th-century Thapahiti and Saugal-tol, and 12th century Naksal stone sculptures.

Artifacts discovered at the Sanxingdui culture founded c. 1600 BCE, about 40 km from present day Chengdu, capital city of Sichuan province China reveal an ancient worship of sun-deity, similar to Surya. The artifacts include a gold sheet with design of four birds flying around the sun deity, and a bronze sculpture of the surya-chakra.

== In cultures, arts and other religions ==
A devotional folk song in praise of Surya, the Sun God

=== Festivals ===
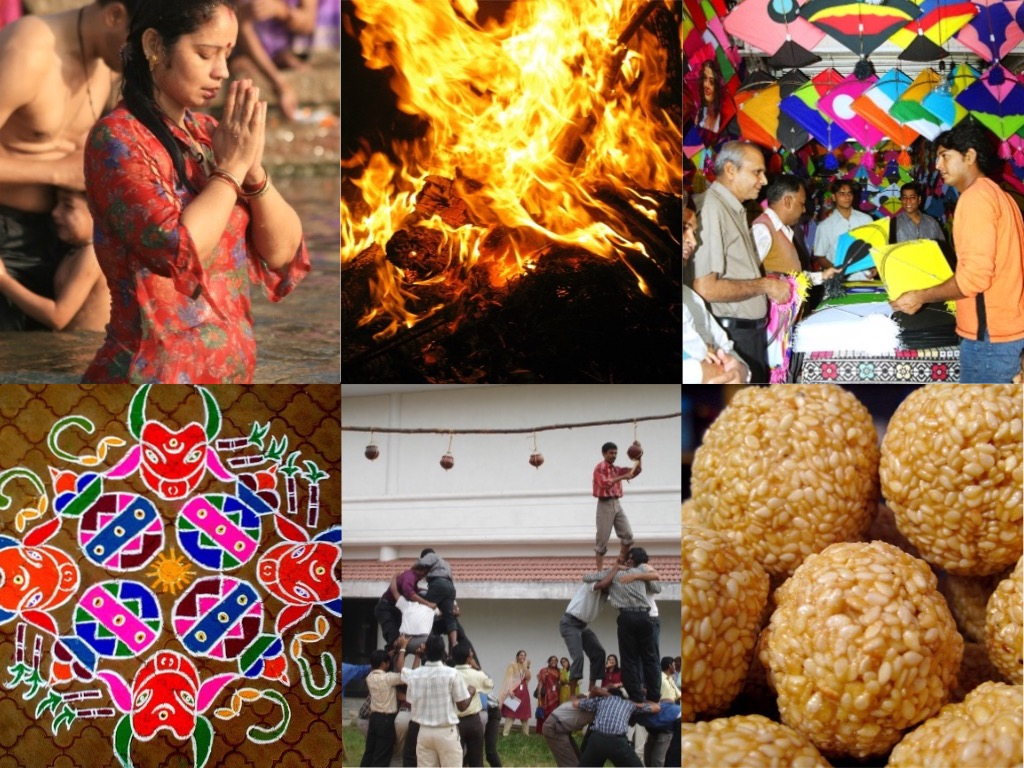
Various observances in the festival of Makar Sankranti.

Various festivals mark deity Surya and these vary regionally in India. Pongal or Makara Sankaranti is the most widely celebrated Hindu festival dedicated to the Sun God. These celebrate a good harvest. Other festivals that focus on Surya include Chhath of Bihar, eastern Uttar Pradesh and the neighboring regions, weekly Raib Parva in Mithila region, Samba Dashami and Ratha Saptami are also major festivals celebrated in honour of Surya; Chhath is celebrated immediately after Diwali with fasting for three days followed by bathing in river or tank with remembrance of Sun. Similarly Aytar Puja is celebrated in Goa. The latter is known as Aditya Ranubai in Maharashtra.

The second day of the Pongal harvest festival is dedicated to Surya in Tamil Nadu, and is called the "Surya Pongal". Another festival named Kartik Puja marks Surya, along with Shiva, Vishnu, Lakshmi, Radha, Krishna and Tulsi. It is observed by Hindu women, typically with visit to rivers such as the Ganges, socialization and group singing.

=== Dances ===
The repertoire of classical Indian dances such as the Bharatanatyam include poses that signify rays of light beaming towards all of the universe, as a form of homage to Surya.

=== Yoga ===
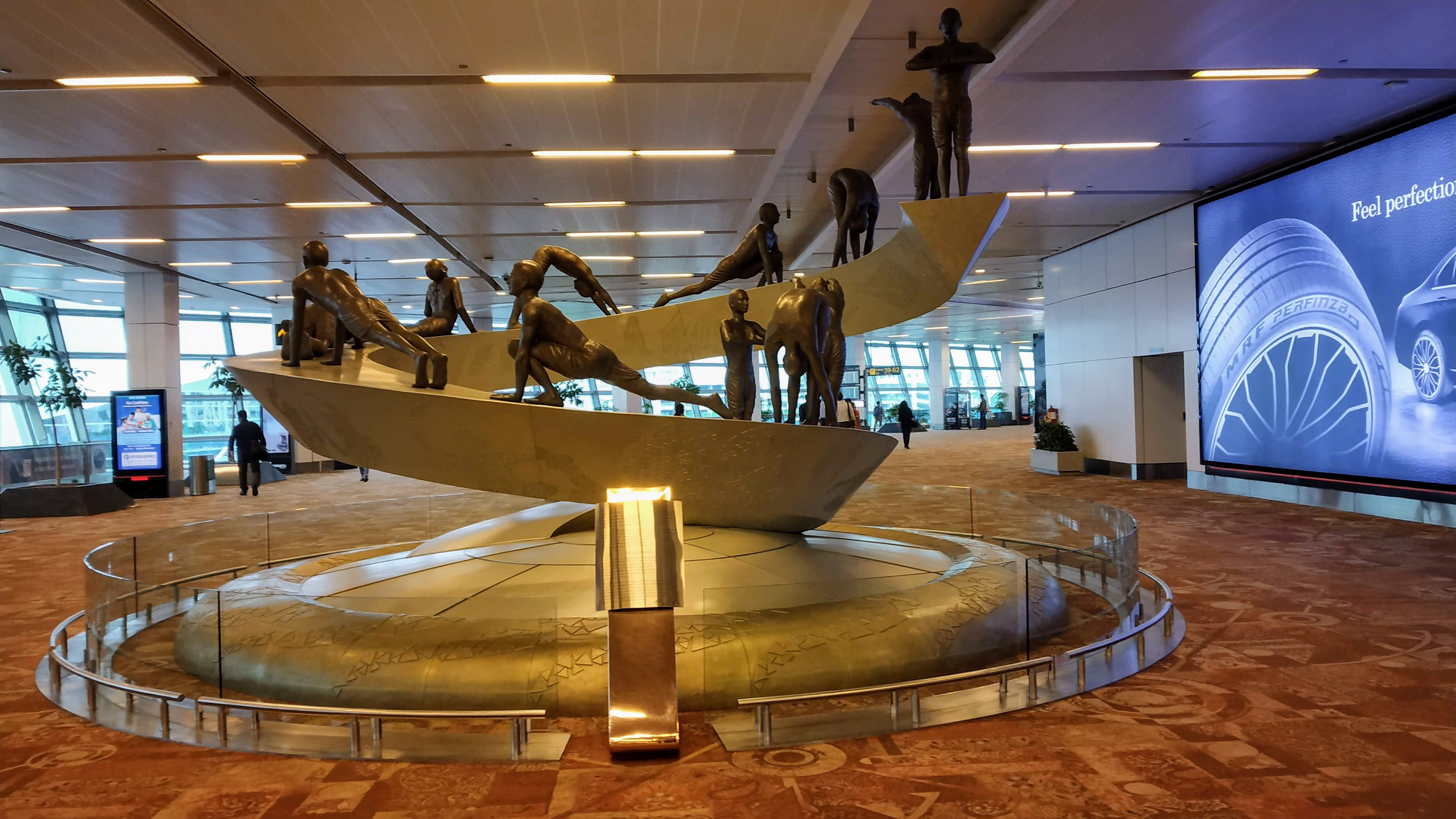
Sculpture depicting 12 asana's of Surya Namaskara A in Terminal T3 at IGIA Airport, New Delhi, India, created by Nikhil Bhandari.

Sūrya namaskāra literally means sun salutation. It is a Yoga warm up routine based on a sequence of gracefully linked asanas. The nomenclature refers to the symbolism of Sun as the soul and the source of all life. It is relatively a modern practice that developed in the 20th century.

A yogi may develop a personalized yoga warm up routine as surya-namaskar to precede his or her asana practice.

The Gayatri Mantra is associated with Surya (Savitr). The mantra's earliest appearance is in the hymn 3.62.10 of the Rigveda.

Might we make our own that desirable effulgence
of god Savitar, who will rouse forth our insights.

Gayatri mantra (translated by S. Jamison)

=== Buddhism ===
Surya is celebrated as a deity in Buddhist works of art, such as the ancient works attributed to Ashoka. He appears in a relief at the Mahabodhi Temple in Bodhgaya, riding in a chariot pulled by four horses, with Usha and Prattyusha on his sides. Such artwork suggests that the Surya as symbolism for the victory of good over evil is a concept adopted in Buddhism from an earlier Indic tradition.

In Chinese Buddhism, Surya (日天, Rìtiān) is regarded as one of the Twenty-Four Devas (二十四諸天, Èrshísì zhūtiān) who are guardian protective deities of Buddhism. His statue is usually enshrined in the Mahavira Hall of Chinese Buddhist temples, along with the other devas.

In Japanese Buddhism, Surya is one of the Twelve Devas, as guardian deities, who are found in or around Buddhist shrines (十二天, Jūni-ten). In Japan, he has been called "Nit-ten".

On the Mount Meru Buddhist cosmological system, Surya is considered a female deity, contrasting a male lunar god.

== Outside the Indian subcontinent ==
=== Indonesia ===
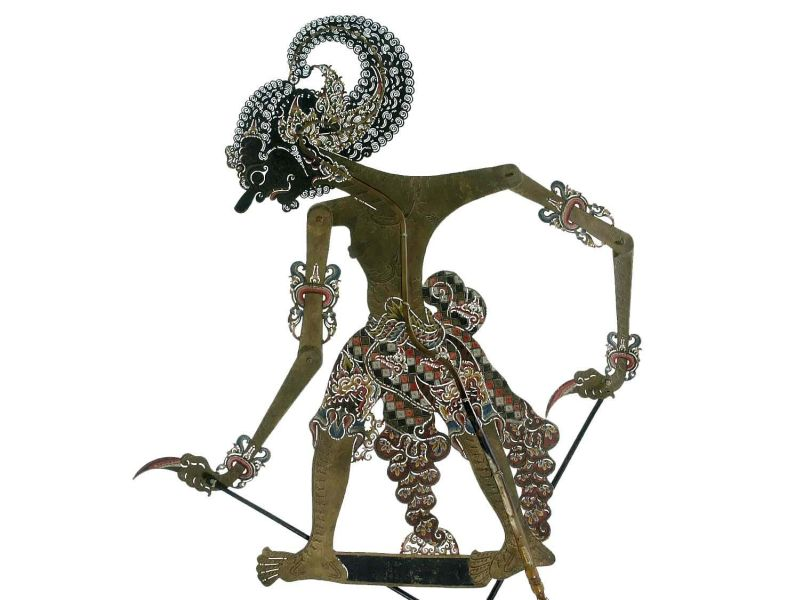
Batara Surya wayang (puppetry) figures

In Indonesia. Surya (Indonesian: Batara Surya) was adapted into Indonesian culture as the god who rules the sun, and was given the title "Batara". Batara Surya is famous for giving his heirlooms or gifts to the people he chooses. This god is famous for having many children from various women, among them from Dewi Kunti in the Mahabharata who gave birth to Adipati Karna.

Batara Surya was hit when Anoman blamed Batara Surya for what happened to his mother, Dewi Anjani and her grandmother, who had been cursed by her husband. Anoman feels Batara Surya must be responsible so Anoman with his magic collects clouds from all over the world to cover the natural world so that the rays of the sun cannot reach the earth. Fortunately, this incident can be resolved amicably so that Anoman voluntarily removes the clouds again so that the natural world is exposed to the sun again. Surya has three queens namely Saranyu (also called Saraniya, Saranya, Sanjna, or Sangya), Ragyi, and Prabha. Saranyu is the mother of Vaiwaswata Manu (seventh Manu, the present day), and twins Yama (god of death) and his sister Yami. She also bore him the twins known as Aswin, and the gods. Saranyu, unable to witness the bright light from Surya, created a clone of herself named Chaya, and orders her to act as Surya's wife during her absence. Chaya had two sons by Surya-Sawarni Manu (the eighth Manu, the next) and Sani (the god of the planet Saturn), and two daughters-Tapti and Vishti. Batara Surya also had a son, Rewanta, or Raiwata, from Ragyi. Interestingly, Surya's two sons – Sani and Yama – are responsible for judging humans' lives, after death. Sani gives the results of one's actions through one's life through appropriate punishments and rewards, while Yama gives the results of one's actions after death.

In the Ramayana, Surya is mentioned as the father of King Sugriva, who helped Rama and Lakshmana in defeating King Ravana. He also trains Hanoman as his teacher. In the Mahabharata, Kunti receives a mantra from a sage, Durvasa; if spoken, he will be able to summon every god and bear children by him. Believing in the power of this spell, Kunti unwittingly has summoned Surya, but when Surya appears, she gets scared and demands him to return. However, Surya has an obligation to fulfill the spell before returning. Surya miraculously made Dewi Kunti to give birth to a child, while maintaining her virginity so that she, as an unmarried princess, would not have to face any shame or be the target of questions from society. Kunti feels compelled to leave behind her son, Karna, who grows up to be one of the central characters in the great war of Kurukshetra.

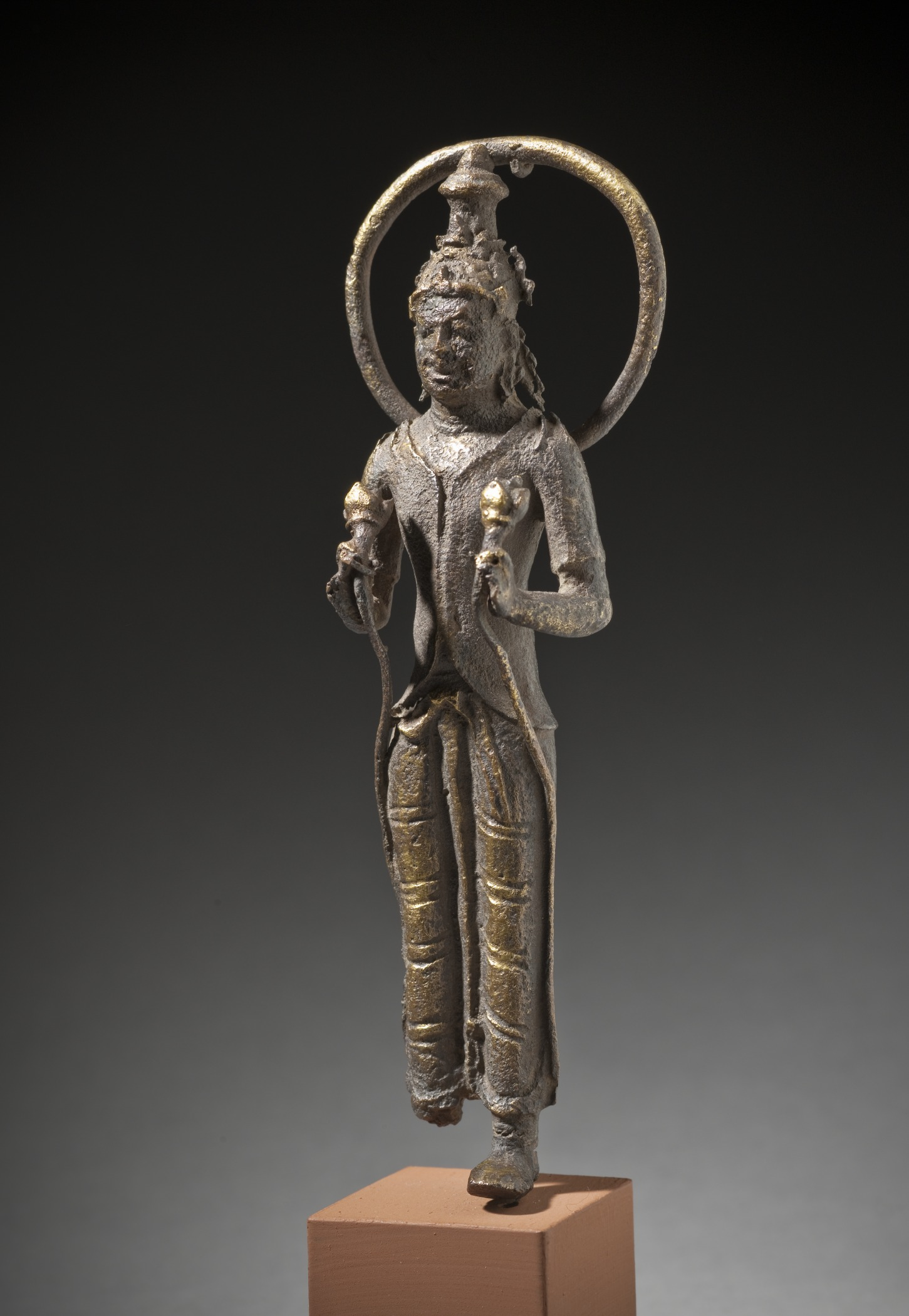
Batara Surya statue, late eighth century, Central Java, Indonesia

==== Worshiping Shiva Raditya in Bali ====
In the Puranas in Bali, Batara Surya is the most intelligent student of Shiva, so that Surya was given the title Surya Raditya and used as an example to find out the intelligence or supernatural power of Shiva, and as a thank you from Batara Surya, Shiva was given an honorary title by the name of Batara Guru, because he is the teacher of the Gods. There are others who argue, however, that in the transformation of the Puranas which is the interpretation of the maharsi on the Vedic chess book, it was Dewa Surya who later turned into Ludra, who was finally called Shiva, so that in worship chants it is often called the term Shiva Aditya.

In the concept of Gama Bali there is a Pelinggih named Pelinggih Surya or Padmasana, which is a place to worship Shiva who manifests as Shiva Raditya or the sun god. In the Yayur Veda there are several special rituals for the Sulinggih who worship God in the morning in its manifestation as the Surya Batara, namely those that come from Surya Sewana or Surya Namaskar which means worshiping the Surya Batara. In the Panca Sembah mantra, there is also a special mantra aimed at Shiva Raditya. According to the general view, Batara Surya is worshiped because he is a witness to life and he is the best student of Lord Shiva, so he was given the title Hyang Siwa Raditya ("Surya student of Lord Shiva"). The importance of Dewa Surya in Bali can be seen from the existence of Sanggah Surya, which must always be present at every Yadnya ceremony in Bali. and this is poured in several Balinese literary manuscripts, one of which is the Bhama Kertih Lontar.

== See also ==
- Solar dynasty
