= Arasavalli =

- Out growth
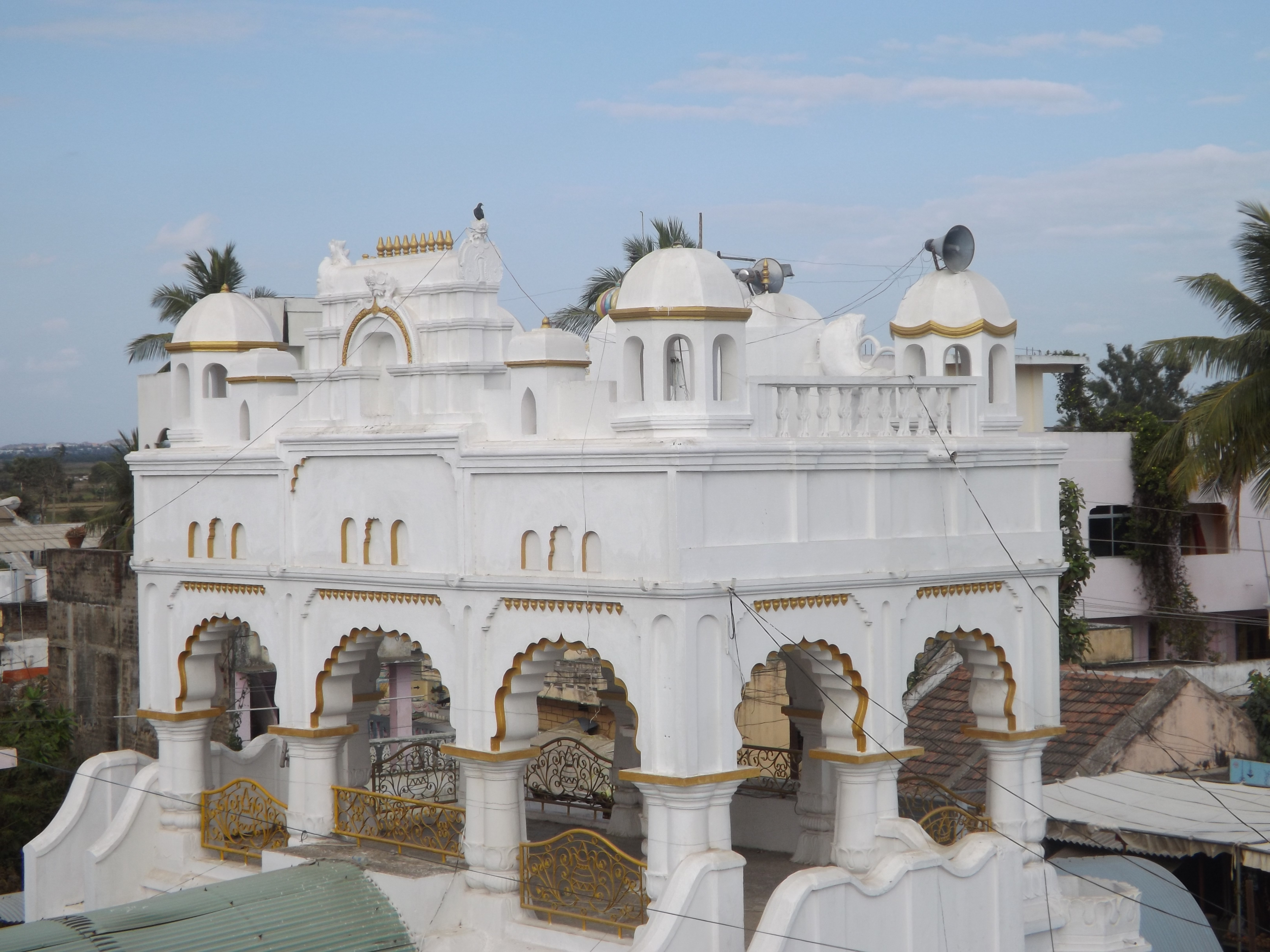
- Suryanarayana Temple in Arasavilli
- Interactive map of Arasavalli
- Location in Andhra Pradesh, India
- Coordinates: 18.3°N 83.9°E
- Country: India
- State: Andhra Pradesh
- District: Srikakulam
- Mandal: Mandal

Population (2011)
  - Total: 4,096

Languages
  - Official: Telugu
- Time zone: UTC+5:30 (IST)
- Vehicle Registration: AP30 (Former); AP39 (from 30 January 2019)

Arasavalli is a neighborhood of Srikakulam in Srikakulam district of the Indian state of Andhra Pradesh. It is located in Srikakulam mandal of Srikakulam revenue division. It is situated at a distance of about 1.6 km. from Srikakulam, the district headquarters and 17 km. from Srikakulam road, the railway station on Visakhapatnam-Howrah Line.

== The Temple ==
A prominent Kalinga architectural temple dedicated to Surya can be found in Arasavalli Sun Temple, which is in the Srikakulam district of Andhra Pradesh, India. The temple is built in such a way that the sun rays fall on the feet of the God, twice in a year in the months of February and June in the early hours of the day. All Sundays during the five months starting with 'Magha Nakshatra' are considered sacred.

Idols of Aditya, Ambica, Vishnu, Ganesha and Maheswara representing different faiths have been installed in one place.

The Sun God is depicted riding over a chariot drawn by seven horses driven by Anurudu, the Ratha Sarathi. It has been exquisitely carved out of a single black granite stone.

The coastal district temple is peculiar with its latitude aligned to the minor lunar standstill. Also the transition from lunar calendar of north India to solar calendar of south India can be seen in the local culture. This is probably the eastern most sun temple in the peninsular India, where prayers are offered till date. The place, Chicacole, has a significance in the Kalinga (historical region) kingdom with their port at Kalingapatnam, making it to Megasthenes dairy (Calingae). The diaspora is spread in the present day south east Asia at historical Kalinga (province), Kalingga Kingdom etc. Prince Vijaya, the first ruler of Sri Lanka is believed to have a Kalinga lineage.

The original name Harshavalli means abode of joy. It is believed to have been built in the 7th century AD by the Kalinga rulers Devendra Varma .
