= Panchavimshatimurti =

Aspects of Shiva in the Agama texts

The panchavimshatimurti (Sanskrit: पञ्चविंशतिमूर्ति, romanized: Pañcaviṃśatimūrti, lit. 'twenty-five forms') is the representation of twenty-five forms of Shiva in Hindu iconography. These forms are described in the Shaiva Agamas of the southern Shaiva Siddhanta sect of Shaivism. The Sritattvanidhi calls these the panchavimshatililamurti (twenty-five sportive forms). These forms are based on the Puranas and the Itihasas, in which the theme of Shiva's divine play is explained with numerous narratives. Most of these forms are featured in South Indian temples as the main images of the sanctum or sculptures and reliefs in the outer walls of Shiva temples.

== Description ==
The Agama texts describe twenty-five forms of Shiva, offering specifications in which the deity is to be represented. For each form, the attire, ornaments, posture, weapons, as well as the other accessories associated with the form are described, along with associated deities and objects.

== Iconography ==
The common list of the Panchavimshatimurti is given below:

Form	Depiction	Description
Bhikshatana		Bhikshtana is depicted in the form of a nude four-armed mendicant, adorned with ornaments and holding a begging bowl in his hand.
Kamari		Kamari is depicted as the form of the deity that incinerated Kama with his third eye.
Kalantaka		Kalantaka is depicted as the form of the deity that rescued his devotee, Markandeya, from Yama, the god of death.
Kalyanasundara		Kalyanasundara is depicted as the form of the deity during his wedding ceremony with Parvati.
Vrisharudha		Vrisharudha is depicted as the form of the deity who is accompanied by Parvati and seated on his bull mount, Nandi.
Chandrashekara		Chandrashekara is depicted as the form of the deity who wears the crescent moon on his matted hair.
Umamaheshvara		Umamaheshvara is depicted as the divine couple of Shiva and Parvati following their wedding.
Nataraja		Nataraja is depicted as the form of the deity who is regarded to be the king of the dance.
Tripurantaka		Tripurantaka is depicted as the form of the deity that destroyed the three asura cities of Tripura.
Jalandharari		Jalandharari is depicted as the form of the deity who slew the asura Jalandhara.
Gajasurasamhara		Gajasurasamhara is depicted as the form of the deity who slew the asura Gajasura, who had assumed the form of an elephant.
Virabhadra		Virabhadra is depicted as the form of the deity who destroyed the Daksha yajna.
Harihara		Harihara is depicted as the syncretic form of the deities Shiva and Vishnu.
Ardhanarishvara		Ardhanarishvara is depicted as the syncretic form of Shiva and Parvati.
Kirata		Kirata is depicted as the form of the deity who assumed the form of a hunter, bestowing the Pashupatastra on Arjuna.
Kankalamurti		Kankalamurti is depicted as the form of the deity who is regarded to have slain Vishvaksena.
Chandeshanugraha		Chandeshanugraha is depicted as the form of the deity who blessed Chandeshvara Nayanar.
Chakraprada		Chakrapada is depicted as the form of the deity who granted the Sudarshana Chakra to Vishnu.
Somaskanda		Somaskanda is depicted as the form of the deity accompanied by Parvati and Skanda.
Ekapada		Ekapada is depicted as the form of the deity who only has one foot, with Brahma and Vishnu emerging from his form.
Vigneshanugraha		Vigneshanugraha is depicted as the form of the deity portrayed with Parvati and Vignesha.
Dakshinamurti		Dakshinamurti is depicted as the form of the deity who is associated with the south and wisdom.
Nilakantha		Nilakantha is depicted as the form of the deity who bears a blue throat, having consumed the halahala poison during the churning of the ocean.
Lingodbhava		Lingodbhava is depicted as the form of the deity emerging from a pillar of light amidst Brahma and Vishnu.
Sukhasana		Sukhasana is depicted as the form of the deity sitting in ease.

== See also ==
- Chaturvimshatimurti, the twenty-four forms of Vishnu
- Nataraja, form of Shiva
