= Sri Krishna Pandita =

Sri Krishna Pandita was a Hindu scholar in Sanskrit who wrote commentary of Taittiriya Sandhyavandanam. Taittiriya is one of the recensions of Krishna Yajurveda. Most of the Brahmins from south India follow this recension. As mention by him in his work, Taittiriya sandhyabhashya (lit. commentary of sandhya as per Taittiriya recension), he was descendant of Raghava Daivagna and his parents were Ramabhatta and Lakshmi. He also mentions that Mukundrasrama and Sri Krishna Desikendra were his Gurus. Even though little is known about his life and whereabouts, his work has gained more attention by latter commentators. An 18th century manuscript of his commentary is with Asiatic Society of Mumbai.

== See also ==
- Sandhyavandanam
