= Chaturvimshatimurti =

Twenty-four forms of Hindu deity Vishnu

The chaturvimshatimurti (Sanskrit: चतुर्विंशतिमूर्ति, romanized: Caturviṃśatimūrti, lit. 'twenty-four forms') is the representation of twenty-four aspects of the deity Vishnu in Hindu iconography. These aspects are described to represent the central tenets of the Pancharatra tradition. They are believed to be the most significant of the thousand names of the deity featured in the Vishnu Sahasranama. The names of these aspects of the deity are ritually chanted in daily prayer by adherents.

== Literature ==
The twenty-four forms of Vishnu seem to have been conceived in the Mahabharata. His forms are first mentioned in Agni Purana, the Rūpamaṇḍana, and the Aparājitapṛcchā. They are also mentioned in Vaishnava Puranas such as the Bhagavata Purana and the Vishnu Purana.

== Usage ==
- The achamanam is a ritual where these names are used while simultaneously touching the numerous parts of the body to purify them.
- The names form an important part of the Bhakti tradition, with saints such as Purandara Dasa having sung many devotional songs in their praise.

== Iconography ==
The chaturvimshatimurti are all represented as standing and holding the four attributes of Vishnu: the Sudarshana Chakra (discus), Panchajanya (conch), Kaumodaki (mace), and Padma (lotus). Symbolising the deity's different visible forms, the only difference between these images is the order of the emblems held by his four hands. All of the forms wear the kiritamukuta, the crown of Vishnu, and the traditional ornaments of the deity. They stand upon the base of a lotus (padmasana). According to Gopinatha Rao, the distribution of the four attributes among the four hands of each form are to be observed in a circular fashion, from the upper right hand to the upper left hand, and then from the lower left hand to the lower right hand.

The Rupamandana provides the following description of the chaturvimshatimurti:

Name	Colour	Attributes	Element	Consort
Keshava	Gold	conch, discus, mace, lotus	Akasha (space)	Sri
Narayana	White	lotus, mace, discus, conch	Vayu (air)	Lakshmi
Madhava	Black	discus, conch, lotus, mace	Vahni (fire)	Kamala
Govinda	Crystal	mace, lotus, conch, discus	Apa (water)	Padma
Vishnu	Yellow	lotus, conch, discus, mace	Prithvi (earth)	Padmini
Madhusudana	Red	conch, lotus, mace, discus	Shabda (sound)	Kamalalaya
Trivikrama	Red (fire)	mace, discus, conch, lotus	Sparsha (touch)	Ramā
Vamana	Red (dawn)	discus, mace, lotus, conch	Rupa (sight)	Vrishakapi
Sridhara	White	discus, mace, conch, lotus	Rasa (taste)	Dhanya
Hrishikesha	White (lightning)	discus, lotus, conch, lotus	Gandha (smell)	Vriddhi
Padmanabha	Black	lotus, discus, mace, conch	Vāc (speech)	Yajña
Damodara	Red	conch, mace, discus, lotus	Pāṇin (hand)	Indira
Samkarshana	Red	conch, lotus, discus, mace	Pāda (feet)	Hiranya
Vasudeva	White	conch, discus, lotus, mace	Pāyu (anus)	Harani
Pradyumna	Gold	conch, mace, lotus, discus	Upastha (genitals)	Satya
Aniruddha	Black	mace, conch, lotus, discus	Shrota (ears)	Nitya
Purushottama	Crystal	lotus, conch, mace, discus	Tvaca (skin)	Nanda
Adhokshaja	Black	mace, conch, discus, lotus	Netra (eyes)	Treya
Narasimha	Gold	lotus, mace, conch, discus	Jihvā (tongue)	Sukha
Achyuta	Yellow	lotus, discus, conch, mace	Ghrana (nose)	Sugandha
Janardana	Red	discus, conch, mace, lotus	Manas (mind)	Sundari
Upendra	Black	mace, discus, lotus, conch	Buddhi (intellect)	Vidya
Hari	Yellow	discus, lotus, mace, conch	Ahamkāra (ego)	Sushila
Krishna	Black	mace, lotus, discus, conch	Chit (consciousness)	Sulakshana

== See also ==
- Panchavimshatimurti
- Chaturvyuha
- Dashavatara
