= Achamana =

Hindu purification ritual

Āchamanam (Sanskrit: आचमनम्, ācamanam) is a purification ritual performed at the beginning of more complex religious ceremonies in the Hinduism, which is believed to cure all physical and mental impurities.

== Puranic Accounts ==
In the Shiva purana, Sati takes achamana, covers herself with a cloth (diksha) and enters a trance from which she sheds her body.

The Devi Bhagavata Purana lists six types of achamana.

== Types of Āchamanam ==
There are three types of Āchamanam, namely, Śrautācamanam (Sanskrit: श्रौताचमनम्), Smṛtyācamanam (Sanskrit: स्मृत्याचमनम्) (Note: Also known as Smārtācamanam (Sanskrit: स्मार्ताचमनम्)) and Purāṇācamanam (Sanskrit: पुराणाचमनम्) (Note: Also known as Paurāṇācamanam (Sanskrit: पौराणाचमनम्)).

ācamanam trividham - śrautaṃ smārtaṃ paurāṇaṃ ceti
tatra pratyakṣaśruticoditaṃ śrautam, sūtroktaṃ smārtam
keśavādyaistribhiḥ pītveti vacanoktaṃ paurāṇam
Achamana is of three types - Śrautā, Smārta (as directed by Smritis) and Paurāṇā (as per Puranas).
There Śrautācamanam is directly instructed by Śruti (i.e. Vedas), Smārtācamanam is formulated by dharmasūtras (i.e. Smṛti).
Sippping (of water) thrice with the (24) names (of Vishnu) starting with keśava is called Paurāṇācamanam

However, in the Sandhyavandana ritual, there exists fourth version of āchamana, known as mantrācamana.

== Śrautācamanam ==
In śrautācamanam, water is sipped three times and is accompanied by the recitation of the three padas of the Gayatri in succession. Alternatively, water is sipped three times with the chanting of Ṛgvedāya Svāhā, Yajurvedāya Svāhā, Sāmavedāya Svāhā. Then, 21 parts of the body are touched while the 21 mantras are recited: the nine Abliṅgas, (Note: Abliṅga (अब्लिङ्ग).— apāṃ liṅgaṃ jñāpanasāmarthyaṃ yatra, A hymn or verse [Rv.1.9.1-3] addressed to the waters;] अब्लिङ्गानि जपेच्चैव गायत्रीं मनसा सकृत् (abliṅgāni japeccaiva gāyatrīṃ manasā sakṛt) Y.3.3.) the seven Vyahritis (Note: Vyāhṛtī (व्याहृती) are the mystical utterances, seven in number, viz. “bhūḥ, bhuvaḥ, svaḥ, mahaḥ, janaḥ, tapaḥ, satyam”. Each of the vyāhṛtis are preceded by the [Praṇava] Om.) (the names of the seven worlds, preceded by the sacred pranava Om), and the 3 padas of Gayatri siras. It is defined in ṣatkarma candrikā as

devyāḥ pādaistribhiḥ pītvā abliṅgairnvabhiḥ spṛśet
saptavyāhṛtisaṃyuktā gāyatrī tripadā śiraḥ
-ṣatkarma candrikā

== Smṛtyācamanam ==
The Smṛtyācamanam is an abridged version of the śrautācamanam. Water is sipped three times, accompanied by the ritual utterance svāhā. Then, 9 parts of the body are touched, accompanied by recitation of the specific sutras that instruct the version of the achamana in question.

== Purāṇācamanam ==
Purāṇācamanam is done with the 24 names of Vishnu starting with keśava, etc. (Note: चतुर्विंशतिनामानि तत्तत् स्थानेषु विन्यसेत्। केशवादीनि विन्यस्य पौरानाचमनं चरेत्॥ (विश्वामित्र कल्पः (1.1) caturviṃśatināmāni tattat sthāneṣu vinyaset keśavādīni vinyasya paurānācamanaṃ caret (viśvāmitra kalpaḥ (1.1)) The water is poured on the right hand palm, which made as gokurna sipped thrice with the first three names. Both hands are washed with the next two names. (Note: केशवादि त्रिभिर्मन्त्रैः अपःपीत्वा यथाविधि। हस्तप्रक्षालनम् कार्यम् गोविन्दे नापि विष्णुना॥ (विश्वामित्र कल्पः (1.9) hastaprakṣālanam kāryam govinde nāpi viṣṇunā (viśvāmitra kalpaḥ (1.9)) For the remaining 19 names different parts of body are ritually cleansed.
