= Ekapada =

Aspect of the Hindu god Shiva

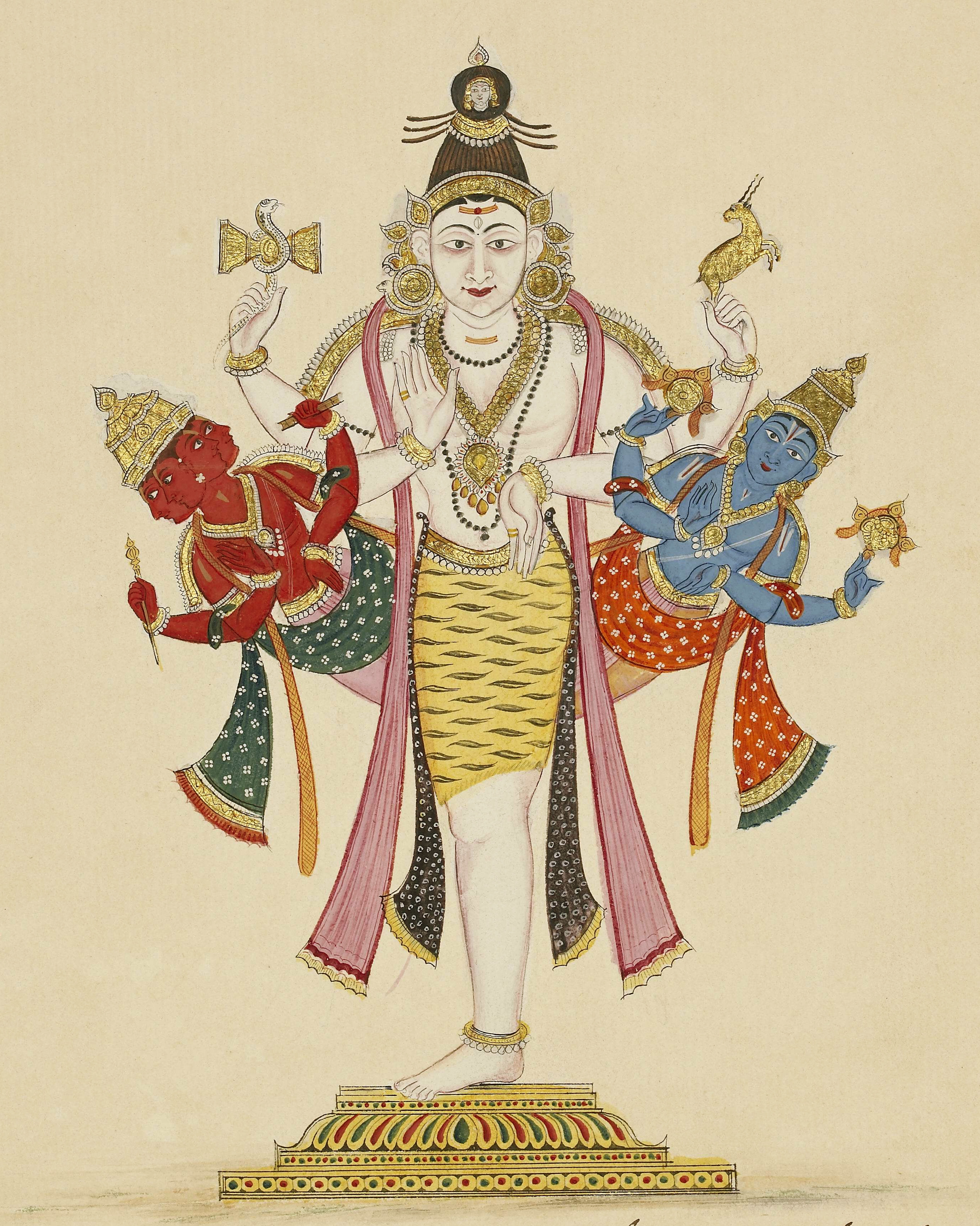
- Ekapada-Trimurti
- Affiliation: Form of Shiva or his fierce aspect Bhairava

Ekapada is the one-footed aspect of the Hindu god Shiva. This form is primarily found in South India and Orissa, but also occasionally in Rajasthan and Nepal.

The Ekapada is primarily represented in three iconographical forms. In the Ekapada-murti ("one-footed icon") form, he is depicted as one-legged and four-armed. In the Ekapada-Trimurti ("one-footed Trinity") form, he is depicted with the torsos of the deities Vishnu and Brahma, which together with Shiva form the Hindu Trinity (Trimurti), emanating from his sides, waist upwards and with one leg; however, sometimes, besides the central one leg of Shiva, two smaller legs of Vishnu and Brahma emerge from the sides. While some scriptures also call the latter configuration Ekapada-Trimurti, some refer it to as Tripada-Trimurti ("three-footed Trinity"). In Orissa, where Ekapada is considered an aspect of Bhairava—the fearsome aspect of Shiva—the iconography of Ekapada-murti becomes more fierce, with motifs of blood sacrifice. This aspect is called Ekapada Bhairava ("one-footed Bhairava" or "the one-footed fierce one").

The Ekapada form of Shiva originated from the Vedic deity Aja Ekapada or Ajaikapada, a name that Ekapada Bhairava still inherits. Ekapada represents the axis mundi (cosmic pillar of the universe) and portrays Shiva as the Supreme Lord, from whom Vishnu and Brahma originate. Ekapada is often accompanied by ascetic attendants, whose presence emphasizes his connection to severe penance.

== Iconography ==
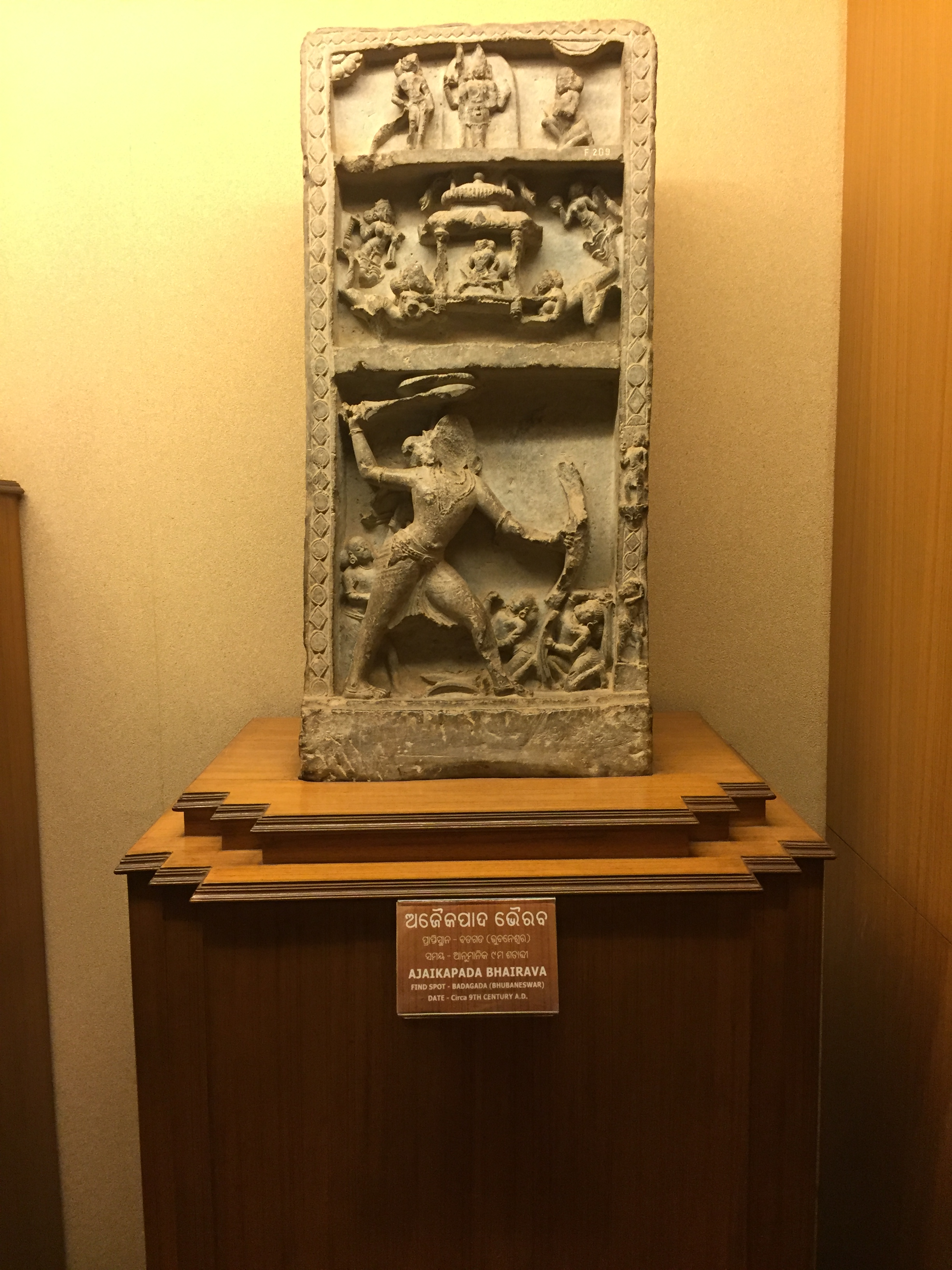
Rock carved Ajaikapada sculpture in Odisha State Museum

The Agama text Amsumadbhedagama mentions that Ekapada-Trimurti is similar to the Ekanetra and Ekarudra aspects of Shiva and is one of the Vidyeshvara aspects. He wears a jata-mukuta (a headdress formed of piled, matted hair) and white silken garments. He has three eyes and a pacific appearance. He holds a trishula (trident) and a tanka (small hammer) in two of his four arms and gestures in varada mudra (the boon-giving gesture) and abhaya mudra (the gesture of reassurance).

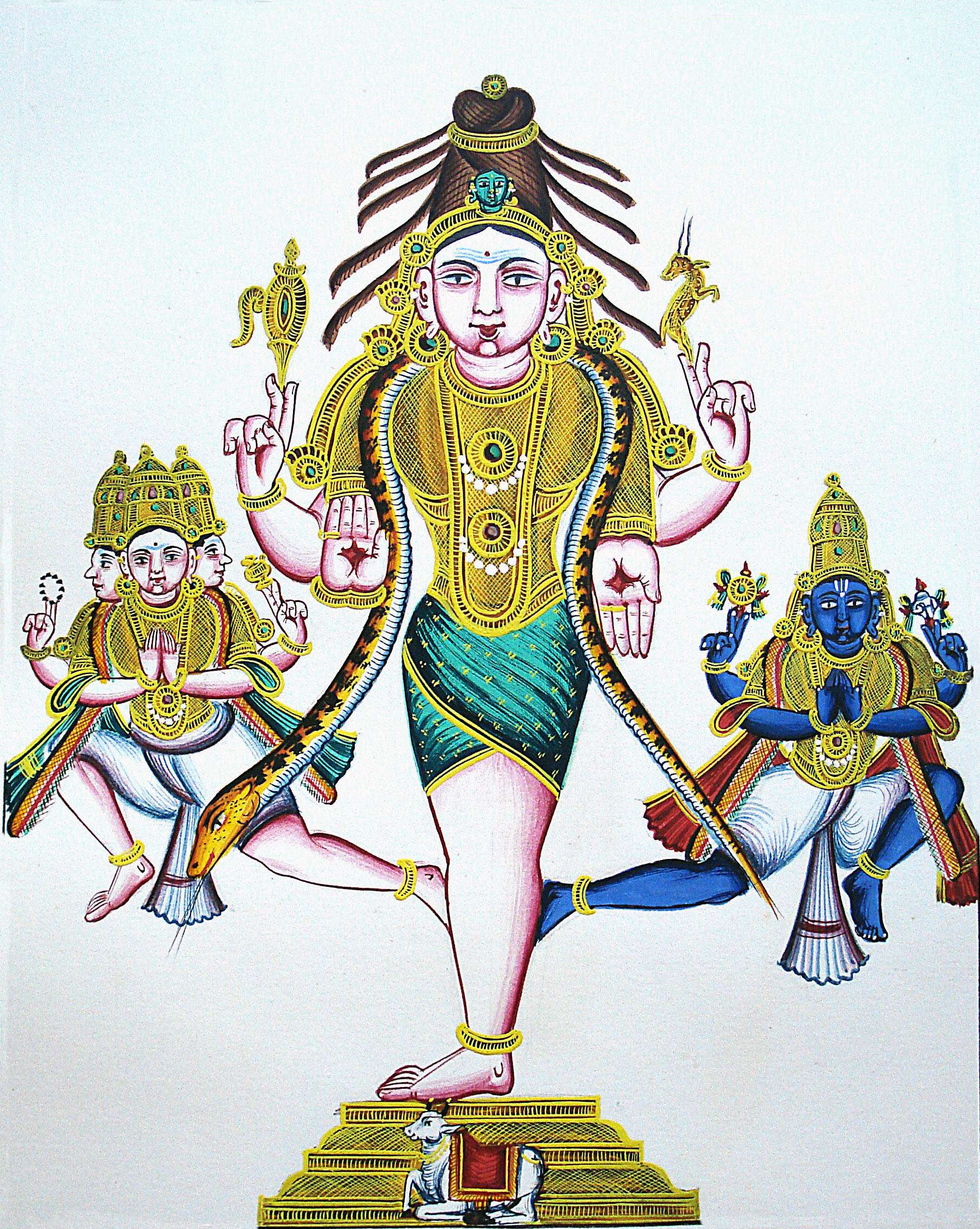
Tripada Timurti.

Another Agama text, the Uttara-Karanagama, also describes Ekapada-Trimurti as one of the Vidyeshvaras. He stands erect (the samabhanga posture) on his one leg on a lotus pedestal (padma pitha). He has three eyes and four arms and is clear as crystal in color. His back hands carry a trisula or mriga (deer) and a tanka and his four hands gesture in varada mudra and abhaya mudra. He wears ordinary kundala earrings or pearl ones and the jata-mukuta. From the right and left of his body emerge Brahma and Vishnu respectively. They are shown from the waist up and have one of their legs bent held above the ground. Brahma and Vishnu are both four-armed and hold their front hands folded (in anjali mudra). In his back hands, the four-headed Brahma holds a sruk (a large wooden ladle used to offer ghee in fire-sacrifice) and a kamandalu (water-pot), while Vishnu—who is adorned with a kirita-mukuta (conical crown)—holds a shankha (conch) and chakra. Ekapada is surrounded by a huge halo, encompassing all his three torsos. A third Agama text, the Uttara-Kanikagama, mentions that the figures of Brahma and Vishnu are proportionally smaller, similar to the size prescribed for female deities. It also associates the one leg of the divinity with the Linga, Shiva's aniconic symbol. The Linga Purana describes Shiva as "the lord who has one foot, four arms, three eyes and a trident ... who is stationed after creating Vishnu from his left side and four-headed Brahma from his right side." In South Indian temples, the icon may be accompanied by yogis or ascetics worshipping it and by the vahanas of the Trinity: Brahma's hamsa (swan/goose), Vishnu's garuda (eagle-man), and Shiva's Nandi bull.

Sometimes, when the legs of Vishnu and Shiva are seen, the icon is called Tripada-Trimurti ("three-legged trinity") as opposed to the icon when the legs of Vishnu and Shiva are not shown, when it is called Ekapada-Trimurti ("one-legged trinity"), although the Uttara-Karanagama refers to the former as Ekapada-Trimurti. When the icon is shown without the torsos of Vishnu and Brahma, it is simply called Ekapada-murti ("one-legged icon"). Another variation of Ekapada, called Mahesha-Ekapada, appears in an 8th-century relief in Mahabalipuram, where he is one-legged and four-armed but also has three visible heads plus a head assumed at the back and top, making it a five-headed icon, resembling the five-headed form called Mahesha or Sadashiva.

In Orissa, the iconography of Ekapada is quite different from that in South India. Though he has his characteristic one leg, matted hair and crescent moon headgear, and ascetic attendants, here Ekapada is never depicted with the torsos of Vishnu and Brahma. He may be four-armed or two-armed and is considered a form of Bhairava, the fearsome aspect of Shiva. He sports a short beard and moustache, an open mouth with fangs, and bulging eyes with a wrathful expression. He is ithyphallic (with an erect phallus) and wears a tiger skin around his waist. He wears various ornaments and a long yajnopavita (sacred thread) across his chest. In later images, Ekapada tends to be more terrifying, with a `garland of skulls, serpentine ornaments and yajnopavita, and a corpse beneath his foot. Early images depict him with a varada mudra gesture and kamandalu; however, in later ones these are replaced by a damaru and a kapala. His other attributes may be an akshamala (rosary), a trishula, a serpent, a deer. His ascetic attendants may hold a trishula and sometimes he is accompanied by a female attendant and his vahana Nandi.

The Vishvakarma-shilpa mentions Ekapada as one of the Rudras and describes his iconography as having 16 arms and holding in his left arms a khatvanga, an arrow, a chakra, a damaru, a mudgara (a mallet-like weapon), an akshamala, and a trishula (trident), with one hand held in varada mudra, and with his right hands holding a bow, a ghanta (bell), a kapala, a kaumudi (crescent moon), a ghata (pot), a parashu (battle-axe), and shakti (power), with one hand in Tarjani mudra (with raised or threatening forefinger symbolizing wrath). However, no representation of a sixteen-armed Ekapada is found.

== Development and worship ==
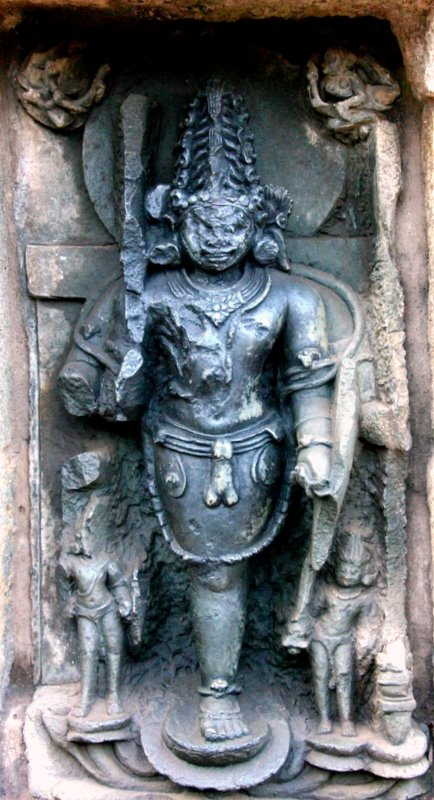
Ekapada Bhairava in Chausathi Jogini Temple, Hirapur, Odisha

The evolution of Ekapada is unclear; however, most scholars agree that he emerged from the Vedic deity Aja Ekapada or Ajaikapada (a sandhi of Aja and Ekapada). The first mention of Aja Ekapada ("the one-footed unborn/unmanifested one") is found in the Vedas (e.g. Rig Veda 02.031.06, 06.050.14, etc.), Hinduism's earliest scriptures. Aja Ekapada is closely associated with Ahi Budhnya ("serpent of the deep ocean"), appearing in juxtaposition with the latter in five Rigvedic hymns and once without him. According to V. S. Agrawala, Aja Ekapada and Ahi Budhnya appear to be twin aspects of the same deity. According to another interpretation, Aja Ekapada appears to be an aerial deity since he is invoked as the supporter of the sky and the thundering flood. In Yaska's Naighantuka (a thesaurus), Aja Ekapada is mentioned with the deities of the celestial realms. The Atharvaveda describes him as made of two worlds. The Taittiriya Brahmana describes him as rising from the east. The commentator of this text interprets Aja Ekapada as a form of the fire-god Agni, as does the modern scholar V. S. Agrawala. Durga on the Nirukta interprets him to be the sun, and some scholars also consider him a solar deity. Some scholars associate him with storms and interpret Aja Ekapada as a lightning strike coming down on earth in a single streak. In the Hindu epics, Aja Ekapada, spelled Ajaikapada, is described as one of the 11 Rudras and an epithet of Shiva, an identification that still is in vogue and is reflected in most of his representations. In the epic Mahabharata, both Ajaikapada and Ahi Budhnya are described as Rudras. The twin deities are characterized as guardians of the gold, with Kubera, the treasurer of the gods. Some Puranas describe Aja, Ekapada (Ekapat), and Ahirbudhnya as three different Rudras. Ajaikapada is described as a Rudra in the Linga Purana too. In most cases Shiva is the governing deity of the Rudras, including Aja-Ekapada.

Ekapada icons are found in most of the important Shiva temples in South India, "in some place or the other", at least carved on a pillar. The Ekapada-Trimurti, found in South India, demonstrates the sectarian mission of the Shaivas (sect of Shiva) to establish their Shiva as the Supreme God and to illustrate that Vishnu and Brahma emerged from him. A similar Vaishnava (sect of Vishnu) icon depicts Vishnu in the central position and Shiva and Brahma emerging from his body. According to another interpretation, the Ekapada icon is that of Shiva in severe penance. Two ascetic attendants, who bow in reverence, emphasize his ascetic nature. In this view, Ekapada is regarded as symbolizing "severe asceticism, the granting of wishes or boons, and absolution." The Vishvakarma-shilpa describes the worship of Ekapada as giving material joys.

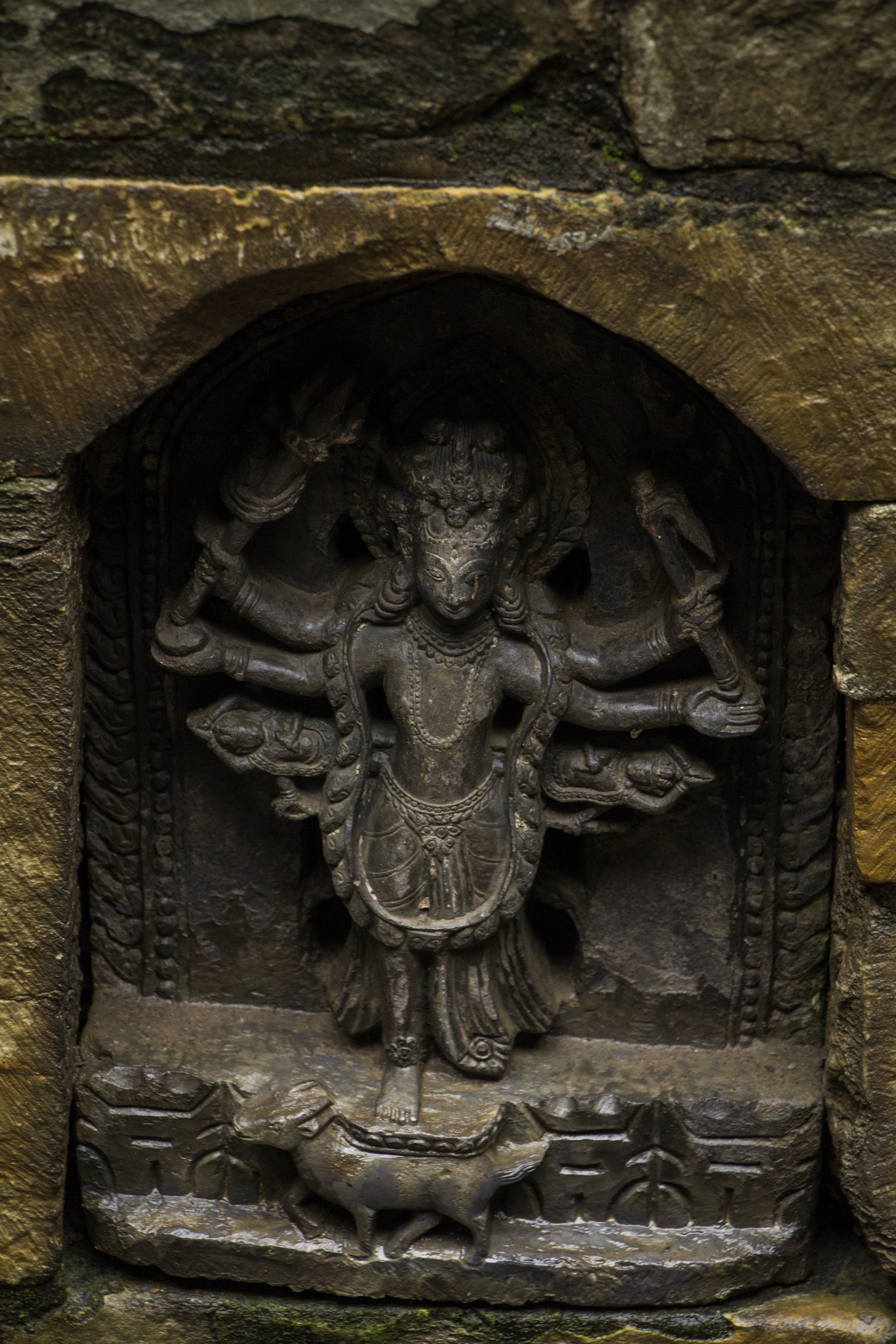
Ajaikapad Rudra in the Royal Bath in Patan, Nepal. His vahana is a goat

Ekapada appears as a secondary deity (avarana-devata) in the northern side niche of temples in Orissa, often next to the central niche depicting the goddess Mahishasuramardini. In Orissa, these icons are known as Aja-Ekapada or Ajaikapada. The earliest Ekapada icons in Orissa date back to the 8th century CE and are also found at the entrance of a caitya or as a guardian-attendant of the Saptamatrika goddesses, as an aspect of Bhairava. He remains the most popular aspect of Bhairava in Orissa, and was also worshipped by the Kapalika sect. The Ekapada-murti icons found in the Kalinga-era temples of Andhra Pradesh mirror those in neighbouring Orissa. In Orissa, Ekapada-Bhairava is essentially a Tantric deity. Tantric texts explicitly associate him with the Vedic Aja Ekapada, fire/Agni, sacrifice, the cosmic pillar of the universe, and the Yogini goddesses, who are also linked to the Saptamatrikas. As a guardian of the Saptamatrikas, Ekapada became more terrible in appearance, with motifs of blood-sacrifice and his depictions limited to Tantric goddess temples. As Vaishnavism rose in Orissa, depictions of him became increasingly rare. According to one theory, Ekapada may have inspired the popular Vaishnava icon of Jagannath, a deity depicted without legs but a single stump below the waist.

Besides in South India and Orissa, images of Ekapada are also found in Rajasthan and Nepal, though rarely.

== See also ==
- Stambha
