= Uma–Maheshvara =

Representation of Shiva-Parvati in Hindu iconography

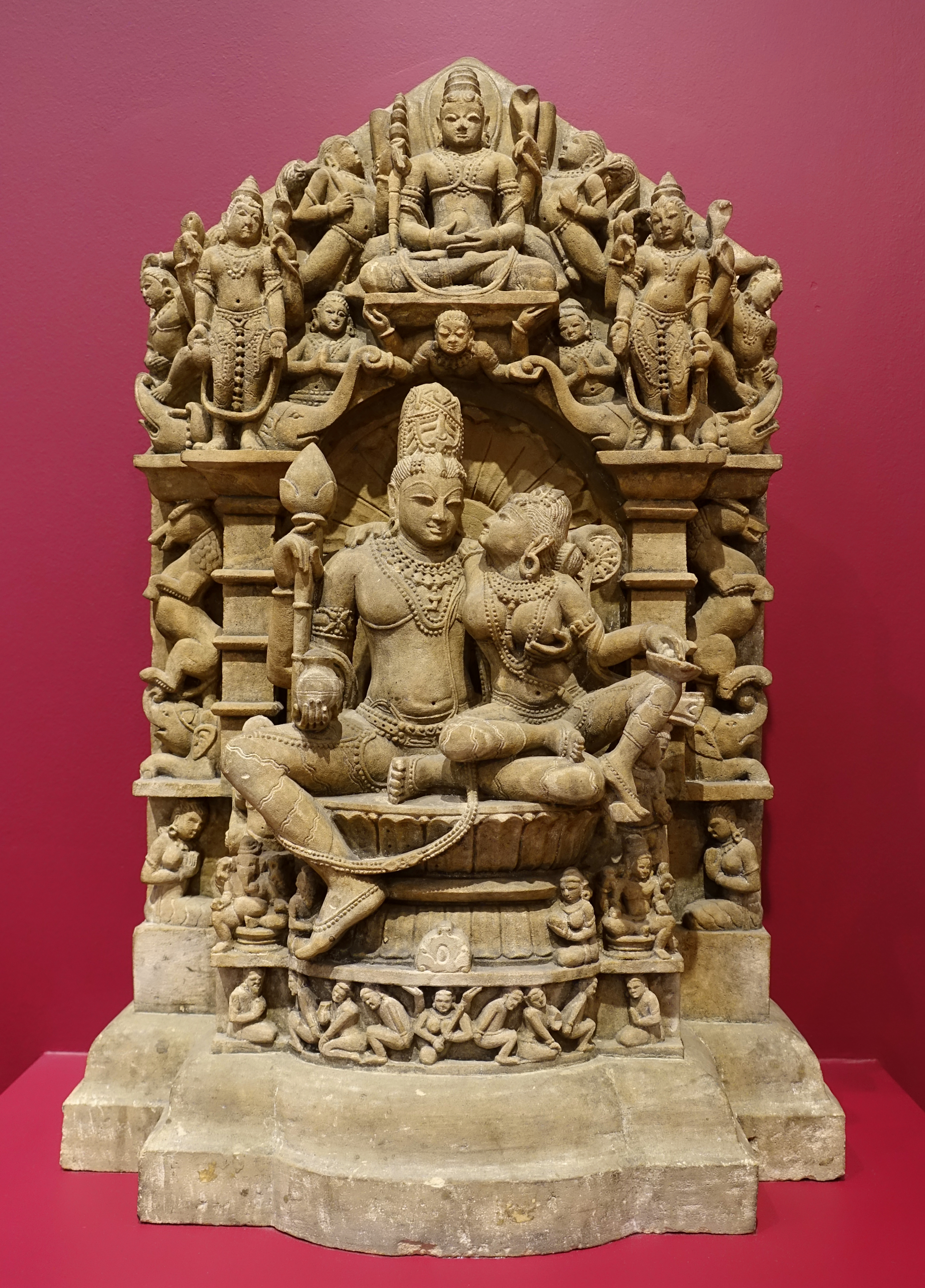
Uma–Maheshvara, central India, probably late 1000s to 1100s AD, buff sandstone, Dallas Museum of Art.

Uma–Maheshvara (Sanskrit: उमामहेश्वर, romanized: Umāmaheśvara) is a form of the divine couple, Shiva (Maheshvara) and Parvati (Uma), in Hindu iconography. It features the two principle Hindu deities in a benign form. It is one of the panchavimshatimurti (twenty-five forms of Shiva in Hindu iconography), as has been described in the Agamas, particularly in the Shaiva Siddhanta tracts of Southern India, and in the Silpa texts. The Uma–Maheshvara images are found in the sanctum sanctorum of several South Indian temples, on the relief-sculptures of the temple walls, and in museum collections. Images exist as paintings and sculptures made out of various materials that represent the potent symbol of the two deities. This form of the deities also travelled in neighbouring countries. In terms of the Hindu spiritual symbolism, the image represents the power and the significance of procreation.

== Spiritual significance ==
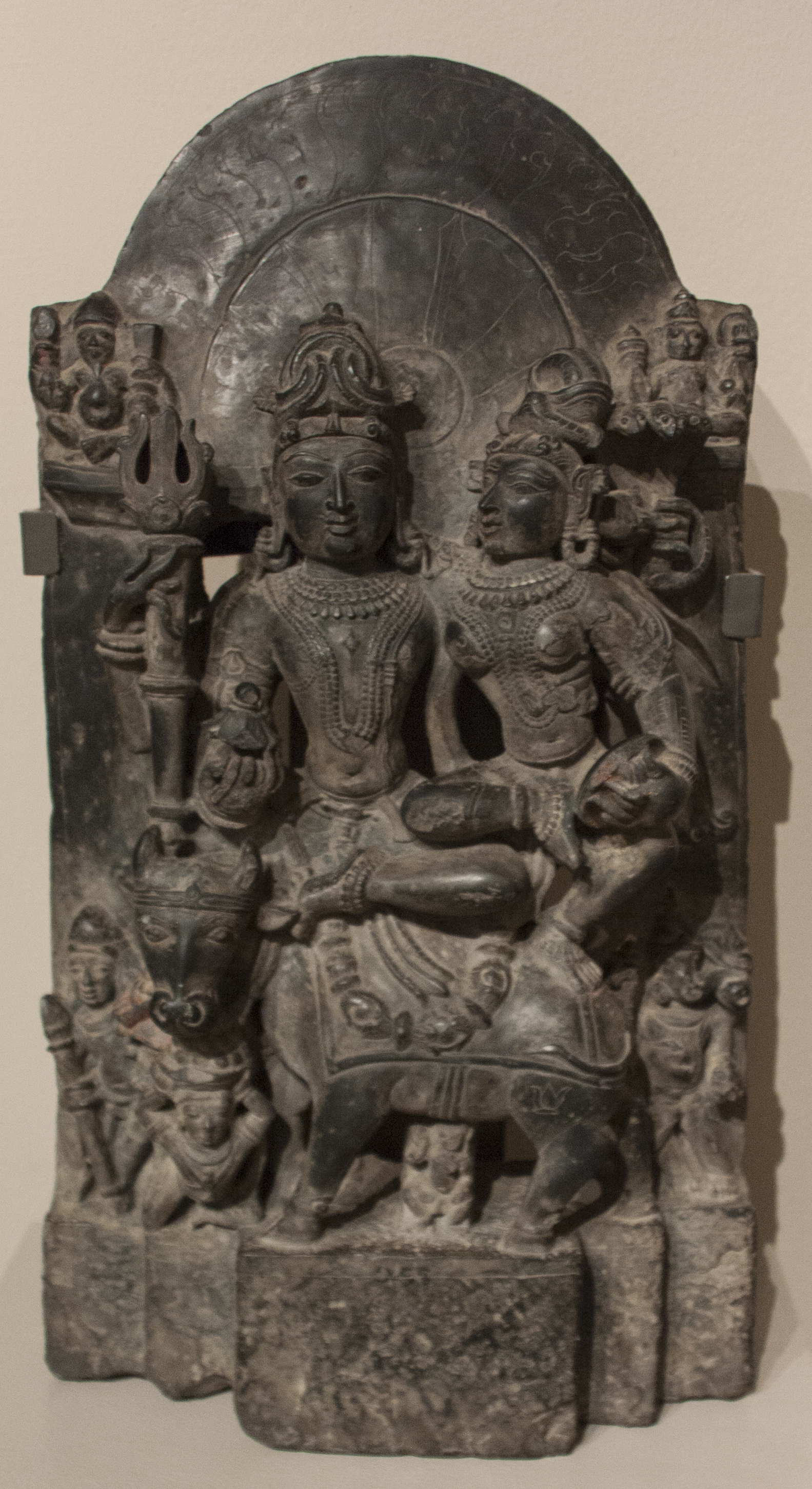
Stone sculpture of Uma–Maheshvara

Uma–Maheshvara symbolises the union of the supreme Shiva (Maheshvara), one of the Hindu Trinity, with his consort, the primordial feminine cosmic energy, the supreme goddess Parvati (Uma). Shiva is a manifestation of the Purusha, while Parvati, as the goddess, represents Prakriti. This divine union of Purusha and Prakriti, the male and the female forms, results in srishti, or procreation, and maintains the constant cycle of creation and balance. Parvati is an ancient mountain goddess, and is usually featured in the images beside Shiva, her husband. She is a divine deity in her own right in Nepal, and at Koh-Ker, a briefly surviving Cambodian royal capital. In certain cultures, such as in Bengal she is described as the daughter of the Mountain, Himavat. Her story finds a mention in Kena Upanishad. It is believed that Sati was reborn as Parvati, after her self-immolation, as the mother goddess who comforted Shiva and maintained the procreative balance of the universe. Shiva, on the other hand, is described by the Vayu Purana as the adisarika bija, or the first seed of creation, and his urdhva-linga, or the erect phallus, showcases his creative potency. The coming together of the two therefore, foregrounds the biological and spiritual process of creation. As Prof. Kramrisch notes: "Uma–Mahesvara may be seen as wedded divine lovers, exalted in their embrace. They maybe realised in their togetherness as Purusa and Prakriti, Spirit and Matter, Essence and Subsistence". The image also reflects domestic and familial values.

== Iconography ==
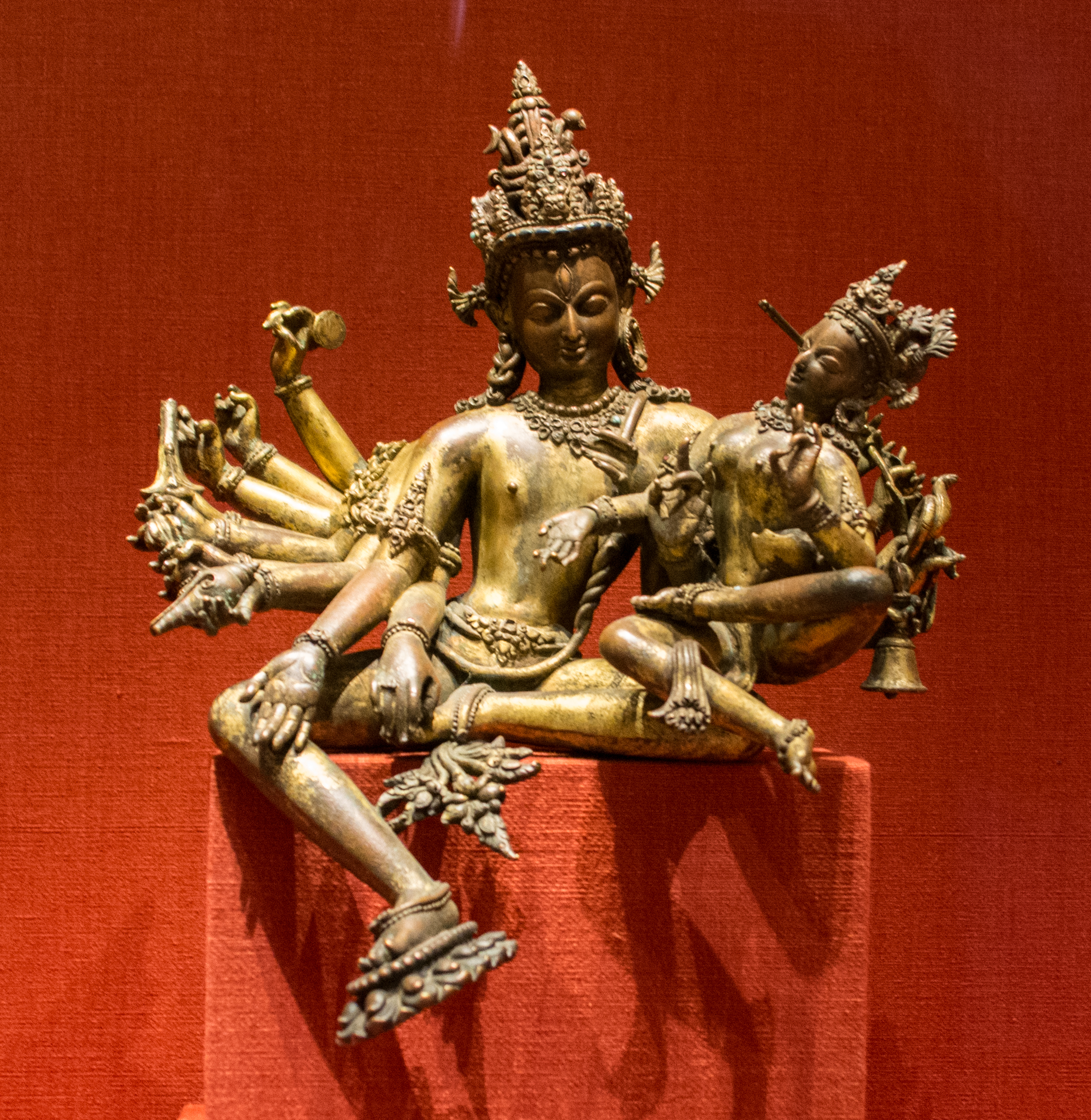
Nepal Uma Mahesvara, Cleveland Museum of Art, 1300 CE

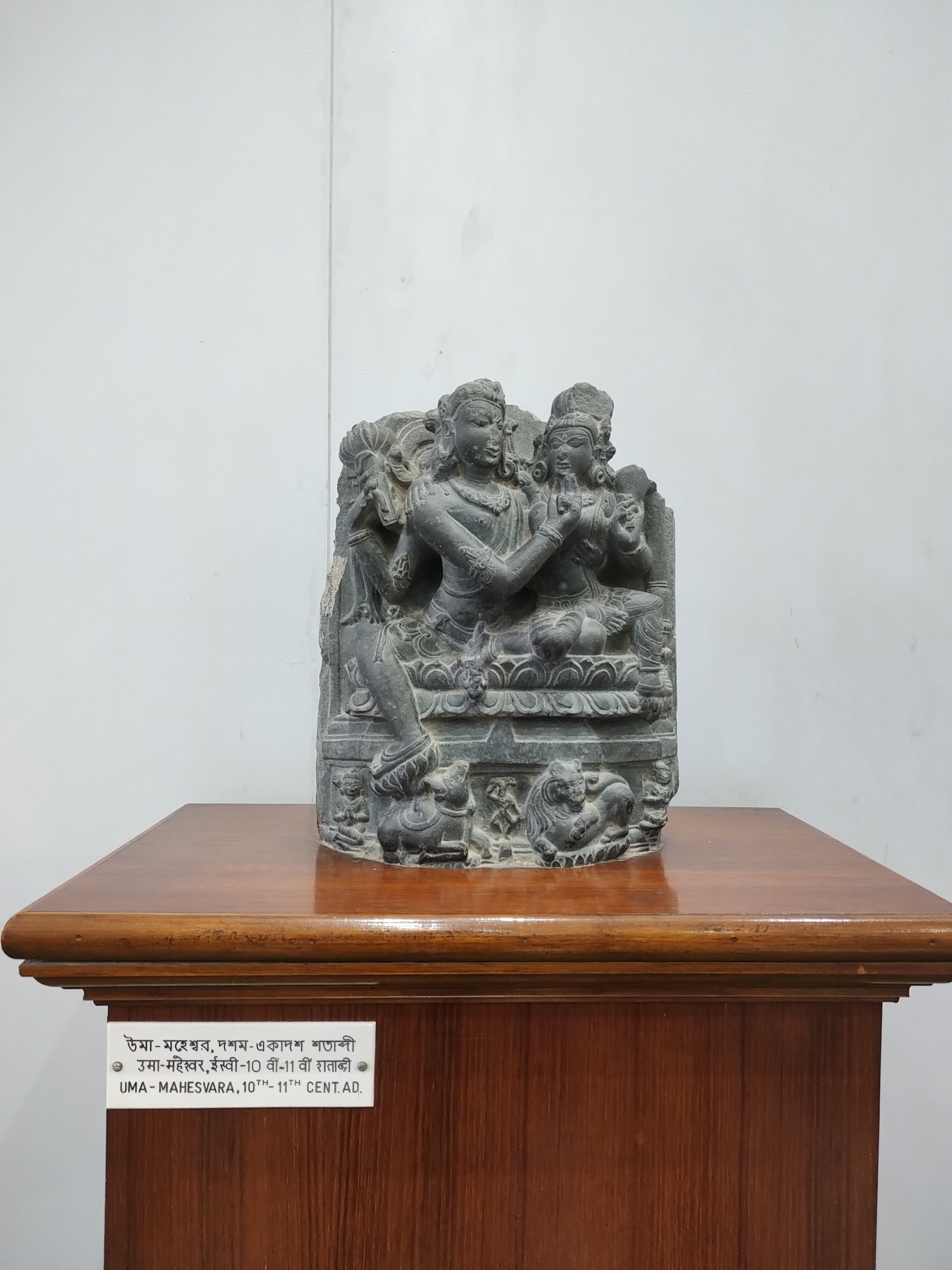
Uma–Maheshvara at Cooch Behar Palace Museum, West Bengal, India.

The several Silpa texts mention definite rules to create an image of Uma–Maheshwara. The Indian artists, working throughout history, have followed these scriptural injunctions to create the images of the divine couple in diverse media, but mostly in stone and bronze sculptures. Therefore, a pattern is often visible in these sculptural and representational images that exude a certain warmth, youthfulness and beauty of the couple. Historians have noted that apart from Shiva, no other male deity in early Indian iconography have been depicted with their spouses. The Uma–Maheshwara image can also be found in the Shaiva sculptures and coins from Mathura, with the earliest depiction of Shiva–Parvati on a gold coin issued by Huvishka, the Kusana Emperor. Different forms of this iconography have also been found been in the temples, and art forms in the Chamba valley that indicate the growth and spread of Shiva worship in the area.

Shiva and Parvati are often represented sitting face to face (the sammukha mudra). They can also be seen in various postures connoting love and desire such as embracing each other in the alingana pose. Shiva in some representations touches and caresses Parvati's breasts (the kuca-sparsa pose) or holds her in his lap (atikarohana form). In the cibukothhapana pose, Shiva holds Parvati's chin, and looks into her shy gaze. The images are usually shown seated over a throne, and their respective vahanas (vehicles), Shiva's bull, and Parvati's lion, are shown crouched beneath the throne, with the pendant legs of each deity kept above their respective vahanas. The sculptures are richly decorated, and the couple are shown wearing heavy jewelry, intricately weaved garments, etc. In the South Indian version of the images, Parvati's lion is often substituted with a godha, or an alligator, associated with an earlier incarnation of the goddess.

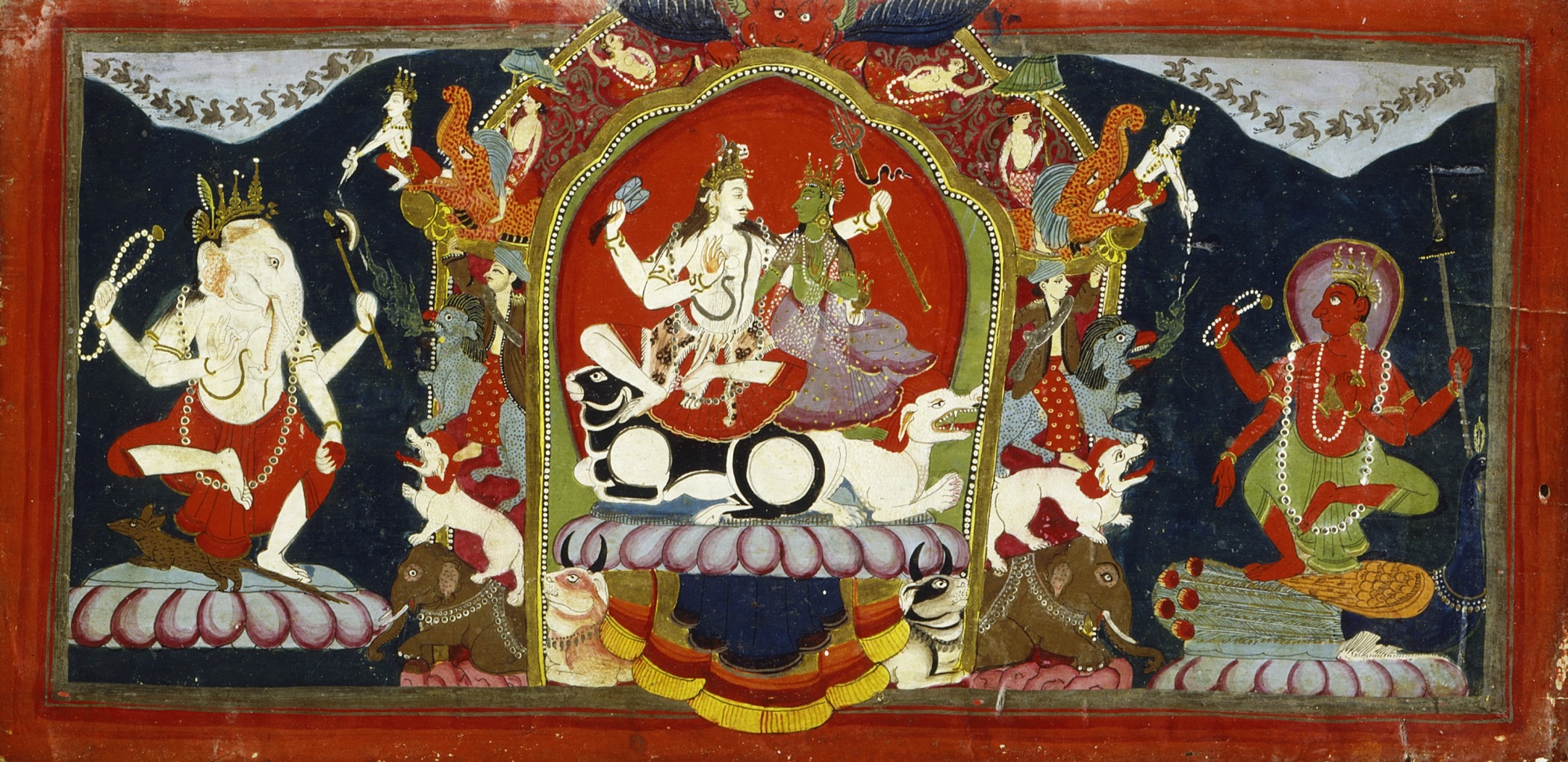
Cover of a Shakta Manuscript with Uma-Maheshvara, LACMA.

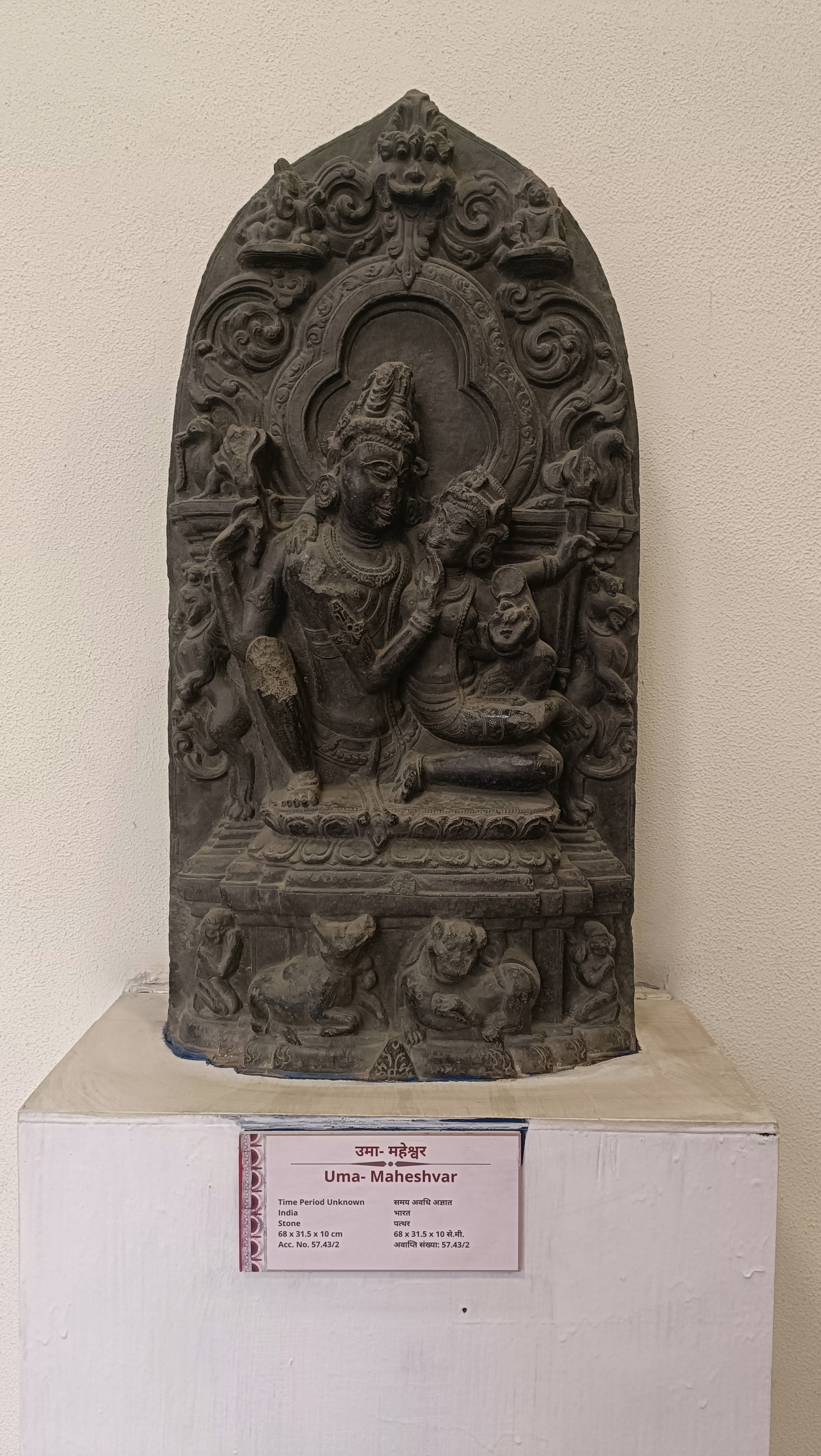
Uma–Maheshvara, Stone statue, at the National Museum, New Delhi.

The Uma–Maheshvara figures can be classified into different types and sub-types on the basis of their diverse styles and subjects. Besides the poses outlined above, the type of the throne can be also used as a category for classification. On this basis, the images vary depending on where Shiva and Parvati are seated, whether under a tree; on a lotus-grove; on a Shiva linga; on Nandi, the bull; or on Mount Kailash being carried by Ravana on his head as in the Ravananugraha. Images also include Shiva and Parvati with baby Skanda on Parvati's lap; and Ganga rushing towards Shiva's matted hair as the divine couple are seated. Images could be further classified depending on the type of mounts shown, the number of hands of Shiva and Parvati, the embellishments of the prasthsila or the back-slab, the deities around the couple, and differences in the sitting-postures, particularly that of Parvati, etc.

In some Uma–Maheshvara images, often Parvati is shown defeating an emaciated Shiva in a game of dice. For many scholars such as N. N. Bhattacharya, this dice-game hints at an egalitarian mechanism of distribution of resources implemented in pre-Vedic societies. Interpretations of the iconography as depicting the female menstruation have also been done by the scholars.

== Present worship ==
Devotees observe a fast on the day of the Bhadrapada Purnima. It is dedicated to the divine couple, and is known as the Uma–Maheshvara Vrata. It originates from a story in the Matsya Purana, where Indra incurs Durvasa's wrath for placing a garland, that the sage had gifted, on Airavata, instead of putting it around his neck. Durvasa's curse entailed that the devas would lose their dominion. According to tradition, he maintained a fast dedicated to Uma–Maheshvara. People still observe it today for familial bliss, domestic happiness, while young newly-wedded couples do so for purposes of reproduction. A temple dedicated to this form of the couple stands at Gokarna, drawing several tourists and devotees daily.

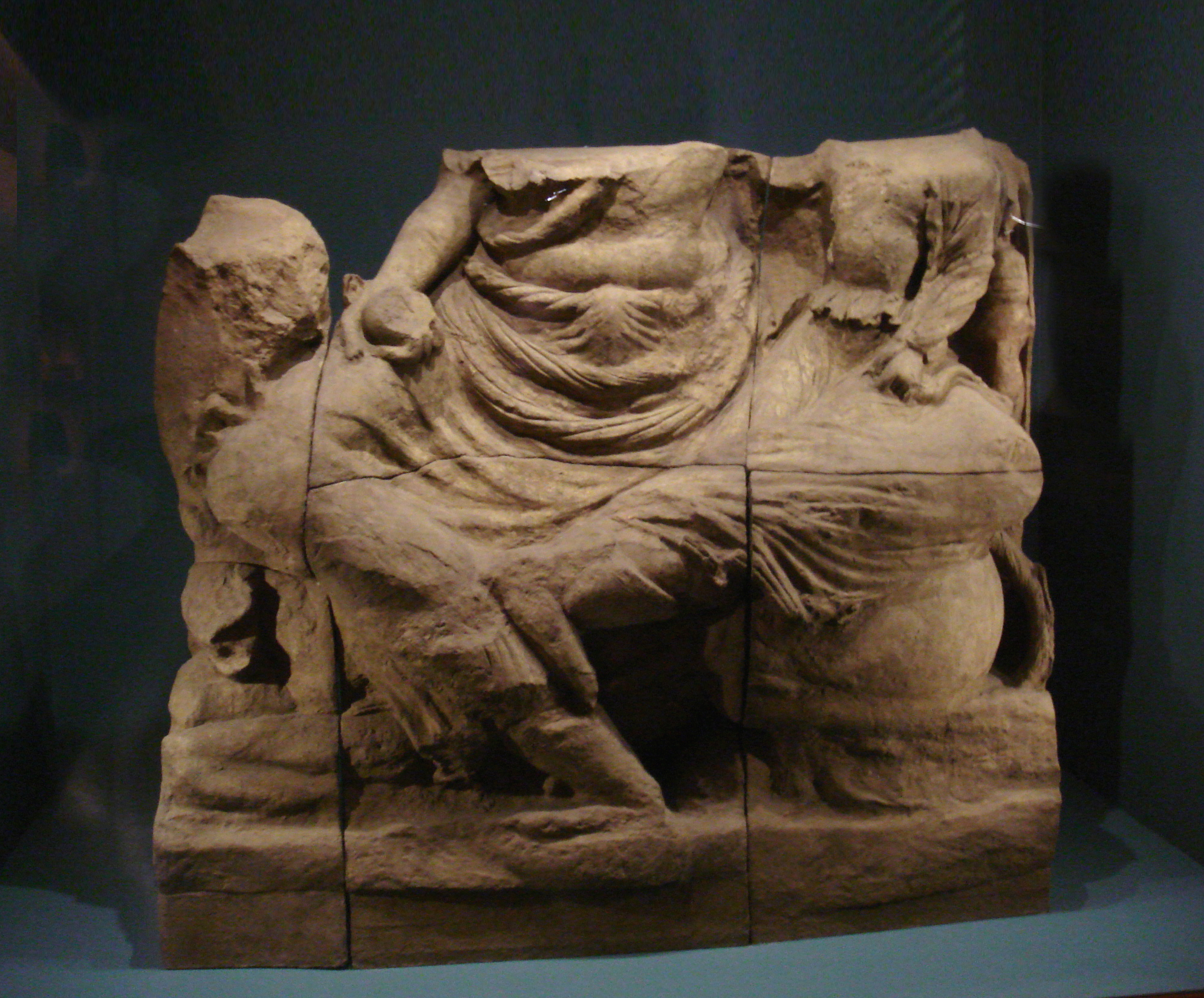
Uma-Maheshvara: ithyphallic Shiva with spouse Uma riding the bull Nandi, Penjikent Temple II, 690-722 CE, National Museum of Antiquities of Tajikistan.
