= Sandhyavandanam =

Hindu diurnal ritual

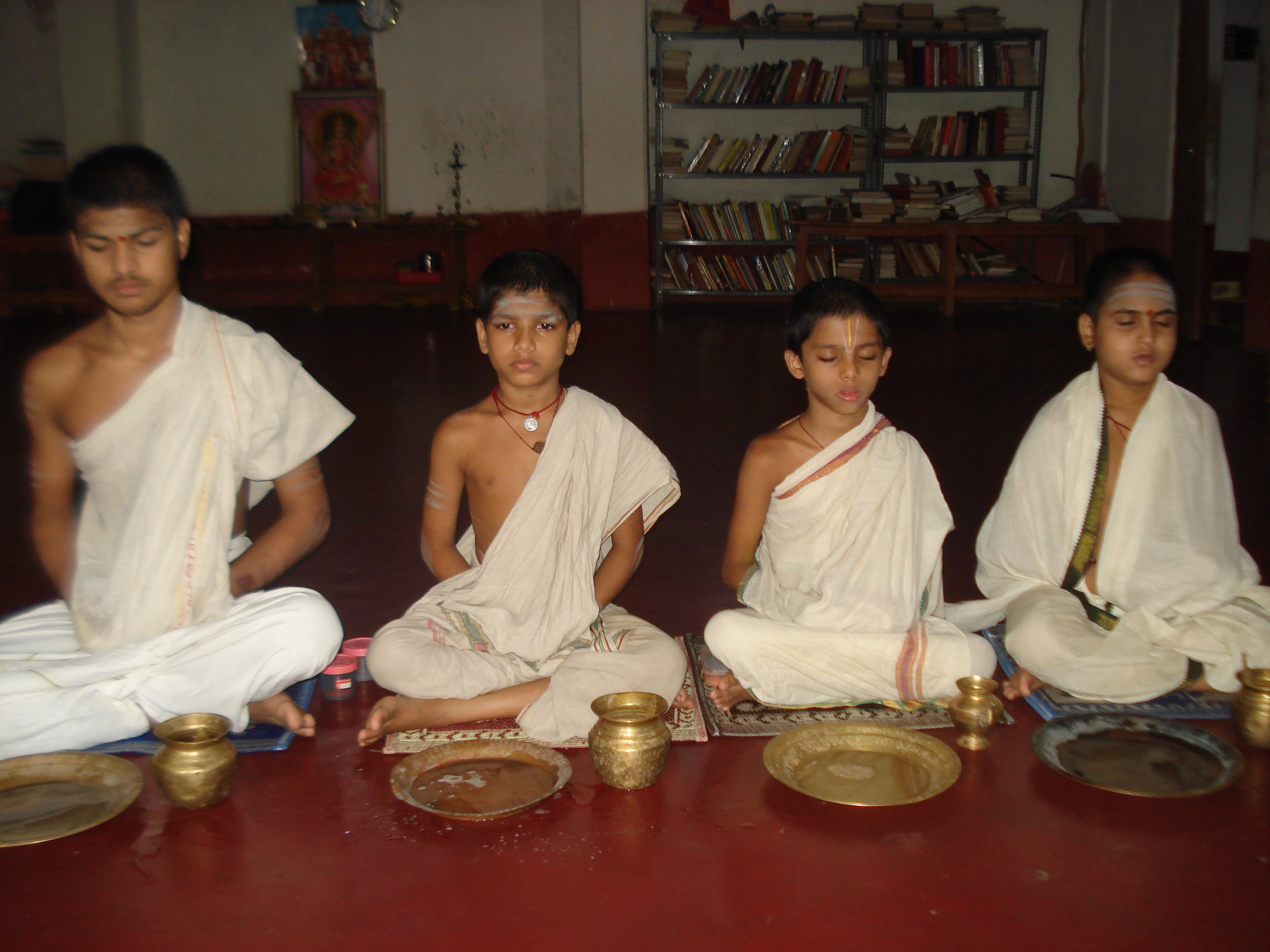
Veda pathashala students doing sandhyavandanam at Nachiyar Kovil, Kumbakonam, Tamil Nadu.

Sandhyavandanam (Sanskrit: सन्ध्यावन्दनम्, romanized: sandhyāvandanam, lit. 'salutation to (Goddess) Twilight', or 'salutation during the twilight') is a mandatory religious ritual centring around the recitation of the Gayatri mantra, traditionally supposed to be performed three times a day by Dvija communities of Hindus, particularly those initiated through the sacred thread ceremony referred to as the Upanayanam and instructed in its execution by a Guru, in this case one qualified to teach Vedic ritual. Sandhyopasana is considered as a path to attain liberation (moksha).

Practice of Sandhyā in Ramayana and Mahabharata by Rama and Krishna can be observed. In Balakanda (23.2, 23.2) of Ramayana, Viswamitra wakes Rama and Lakshmana up at the break of the dawn for the worship of sandhyā. In Udyogaparva (82.21) of Mahabharata there is reference to Krishna performing Sandhya.

== Definition of Sandhyā ==
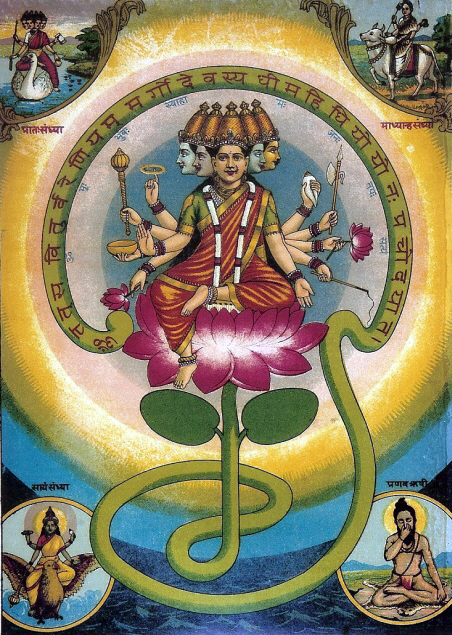
Three forms of Sandhyā devata (Brāhmi, Raudri, Vaiṣṇavi) along with Praṇava Rishi.

Sir Monier-Williams translated sandhyā as twilight (i.e. the period between night and day), as well as "the religious acts performed by Brahmans and twice-born men at the above three divisions of the day". The Sandhyāvandanam consists of ritual recitation from the Vedas. These rituals are performed three times a day - at morning (prātassaṃdhyā), noon (mādhyāhnika) and evening (sāyaṃsaṃdhyā).

== The Gayatri mantra ==
The Gayatri mantra, the central mantra of the Sandhyavandanam, has 24 syllables:

oṃ bhūr bhuvaḥ suvaḥ
tat savitur vareṇyaṃ
bhargo devasya dhīmahi
dhiyo yo naḥ pracodayāt
– Rigveda 3.62.10

Stephanie W. Jamison and Joel P. Brereton translated the mantra as, "Might we make our own that desirable effulgence of god Savitar, who will rouse forth our insights."

== Sandhyākāla ==
Sandhyākāla is also defined as the time to perform Sandhyā. Traditionally, the day is divided by 5 parts, each having an interval of 2 hour and 24 minutes. They are prātaḥ-kālaḥ (early morning), pūrvahna (forenoon), madhyāhna (around noon), aparāhna (afternoon), sāyāhna (evening). As per Hindu traditional calendar, the day (Note: An Ahorātra is a tropical day) which starts with sunrise (i.e. from midnight of previous night until sunrise is considered part of previous day).

A Sandhyākāla is 72 minutes (i.e.ghaṭīs of 24 minutes).

1. Prātassandhyā spans from two ghaṭīs before sunrise and until one ghaṭī after.
2. Madhyāhna sandhyā spans from one and half ghaṭī before noon and until one and half ghaṭī after.
3. Sāyam sandhyā spans from one ghaṭī before sunset and until two ghaṭīs after.

== Direction of Sandhyāvandanam ==
The Sandhyāvandanam is traditionally done facing the east in the morning sandhyā (doing Gāyatrījapa until sunrise), the north in the noon and the west in the evening sandhyā (doing Gāyatrījapa until stars rise). (Note: Yājñavalkyasmṛti (2.24, 2.25)) In the evening, only āchamana part is performed in east or north.

== Parts of Sandhyā Vandanam ==
As per the work Sandhyātattvasubhodini, the Sāṅgopāṅga Sandhyāvandanam (lit. Sandhyāvandanam with all the essential and subsidiary parts) consists of different components termed as aṅgas (lit. limbs). Apart from the principal aṅgi it has 5 anterior parts (pūrvāṅga) and 5 posterior parts (uttarāṅga).

Before commencement of the 5 pūrvāṅgas, there are 3 angas: Ācamanaṃ (आचमनम्), Prāṇāyāmaḥ (प्राणायामः) and Sankalpaḥ (सङ्कल्पः), which are not mentioned separately. These 5 pūrvāṅgas are:

1. Prathama Mārjanaṃ (प्रथममार्जनम्, First cleansing)
2. Mantrācamanaṃ (मन्त्राचमनम्, Water-sipping via Vedic mantras)
3. Punarmārjanaṃ (पुनर्मार्जनम्, Second cleansing. Also known as Dvitīyamārjanaṃ)
4. Pāpavimocana Mantram (पापविमोचन मन्त्रम्, Liberation from sins. Also known as Aghamarṣaṇa)
5. Arghyapradānam (अर्घ्यप्रदानम्, Offering of water to the Sun (Sūrya))

The principal part is the Sandhyopāsanā mantram (सन्ध्योपासना मन्त्रम्), which involves contemplation on Brahman, referred as 'Brahmabhāvanam'. This Upāsanā mantra is also referred as Dhyānam part in Sandhyāvandanam by the smritis. However, few smritis such as by Manu and Āśvalāyana consider Gāyatrījapaḥ as the principle one. The 5 uttarāṅgas are:

1. Gāyatrījapaḥ (गायत्रीजपः, Deep meditation with the chanting of Gayatri mantra)
2. Sūrya-Upasthānaṃ (सूर्योपस्थानम्, Adoration in the presence of the Sun with Vedic mantras)
3. Dik Namaskāraḥ (दिङ्नमस्कारः, Salutation to the Devatas in all the cardinal directions)
4. Bhūmyākāśa ābhivandanam (भूम्याकाशाभिवन्दनम्, Respectful salutation to the Sky (Dyaus Pitṛ) and the Earth (pṛthivī))
5. Abhivādanam (अभिवादनम्, Formal salutation by reciting ones' Gotra and Pravara)

In addition to the above Vedic components of the Sandhyāvandanam, many include the following due to Tantric influences:

1. Gayatri tarpaṇaṃ (तर्पणम्), nyāsa (न्यासः) and Mudrāpradarśanam (मुद्राप्रदर्शनम्) are performed in Yajurveda Sandhyāvandanam due to Śiṣṭācāra.
2. Navagraha tarpaṇam are offerings made every day to each of the 9 planets.

== Accessories for Sandhyā ==
=== Pañcapātra ===
A Pañcapātra is a set of holy utensils used for Hindu rituals. It typically includes a plate (thāḷī, laghupātra) and a ritualistic spoon (uddhariṇī or ācamanī).

=== Āsana ===
According to sages Vyasa and Parashara, a seat (Āsana) for japa is traditionally made of silk (kauśeya), blanket (kambala), skin (ajina), wood (dāruja), or palm leaves (tālapatra). Hindu texts cite various spiritual and material benefits or drawbacks depending on the materials used for the seat.

=== Japamāla ===
A Japamāla is often used for counting the number of recitations in Gayatri japa. An Āsanamantra is typically chanted before taking the seat.

=== Tilakadhāraṇa ===
The Tilakadhāraṇa is the application of a holy mark (Tilaka) on the forehead, as per local tradition, before the commencement of Sandhyā. Materials such as kumkuma (vermillion), gandha (sandalwood paste), gopichandana (sacred clay), and bhasma (sacred ash) are commonly used for this purpose. Shaivites and Smartas mark the tripuṇḍra (त्रिपुण्ड्रम्), also called Bhasmadhāraṇa (भस्मधारण), while Vaishnavites mark the ūrdhvapuṇḍra (ऊर्द्ध्वपुण्ड्रम्).

Tripuṇḍra, or Bhasmadhāraṇa, refers to "three parallel lines of ash marks on the forehead," as mentioned in the Śivapurāṇa (1.18). Ūrdhvapuṇḍra is a perpendicular mark made on the forehead using sandalwood or other sacred substances, symbolizing a Vaishnava identity. Traditional authorities advise that performing Sandhyā without tilakadhāraṇa renders the ritual fruitless. (Note: abhālatilakam kṛtvā tasya karma nirarthakam (the ritual performed without a tilaka on the forehead is considered fruitless).)

=== Upavītam ===
The yajñopavītam (Sanskrit: यज्ञोपवीतम्, sacred thread) worn as upavīta (Note: upanīyate vāmaskando'neneti upavītam (amarakośaṃ lingabhaṭṭīya vyākhyānaṃ)) (i.e. in the proper manner of wearing it from over the left shoulder and under the right arm) is cited as a necessity for performing the Sandhyavandanam.

== Yajurveda Sandhyāvandanam ==
It is usual practice to recite mantras from one's own Veda in Sandhyāvandanam. The procedure described herein are taken from the Taittirīya śākha of (Kriṣna) Yajurveda as followed by Telugu and Tamil people adhering to the smarta tradition. The mantras used in Prāṇāyāma, Mantrācamana, Gāyatrī āhvānam, Devatānamaskāraḥ and Gāyatrī Prasthānam are directly from Mahanarayana Upanishad (Andhra rescension containing 80 anuvakas).

=== Mānasasnānam ===
Sandhyāvandanam starts with mānasasnānam (lit. ' mind bath') that involves viṣṇusmaraṇaṃ (remembrance of Vishnu):

apavitraḥ pavitro vā sarvāvasthāṃ gato'pi vā
yaḥ smaret puṇḍarīkākṣaṃ saḥ bāhyābhyantaraḥ śuciḥ
puṇḍarīkākṣa puṇḍarīkākṣa puṇḍarīkākṣa (Note: Sanskrit: अपवित्रः पवित्रो वा सर्वावस्थां गतोऽपि वा यः स्मरेत् पुण्डरीकाक्षं सः बाह्याभ्यन्तरः शुचिः पुण्डरीकाक्ष पुण्डरीकाक्ष पुण्डरीकाक्ष)

Either pure or impure, passing through all the conditions of material life,
if remember the lotus-eyed, then, one becomes externally and internally clean.

By uttering the above chant, water is sprinkled on head three times.

=== Ācamana ===
Achamana (आचमन) involves sipping water three times while meditating on the 'Supreme Ātman' and avoiding thoughts of the self. Achamana is performed only facing east or north. There are three types of Āchamanam:

- Śrautācamanam (श्रौताचमनम्),
- Smṛtyācamanam (स्मृत्याचमनम्) or Smārtācamanam (स्मार्ताचमनम्),
- Purāṇācamanam (पुराणाचमनम्)or Paurāṇācamanam (पौराणाचमनम्).

Since, this is the first āchamana in Sandhyāvandanam, the sipping of water should be Purāṇācamana (i.e. 24 names of Vishnu starting with Om Keśavāya svāha & Co). Then, one Smṛtyācāmana and Bhūtocchāṭana are performed.

=== Bhūtocchāṭanam ===
A protective invocation is performed, asking for the removal of obstacles in the form of bhūtas (spirits) and piśācas (malevolent entities), so that one may proceed with their sacred or spiritual duties (Brahma-karma) without interference.

=== Prāṇāyāmam ===
Prāṇāyāma refers to the practice of controlled breathing in meditation. It consists of three processes, first is inhalation that involves breathing in slowly through the right nostril; called as pūraka (पूरकः). The second is retention that involves retaining the breath by closing both nostrils, for a period more or less prolonged; called as kumbhaka (कुम्भक). As per Yajnavalkya smriti, the Gayatri mantra with its śiras (head) (Note: The śiromantra of gāyatrī is om āpojyōti rasomṛtaṃ brahma bhūrbhuva ssuva rom (Sanskrit:ओम् आपोज्योति रसोऽमृतं ब्रह्म भूर्भुव स्सुव रोम्)) and preceded by the 7 vyāhṛtīs; (Note: Vyāhṛtī (व्याहृती) are the mystical utterances, seven in number, viz. "bhūḥ, bhuvaḥ, svaḥ, mahaḥ, janaḥ, tapaḥ, satyam". Each of the vyāhṛtis are preceded by the [Praṇava] Om.) to each of which the syllable Om should be added. This chanting has to be done thrice during kumbhaka. Then, the third is exhalation that involves breathing out slowly through the other nostril; called as recaka (रेचकः).

=== Sankalpam ===
Sankalpa means taking the resolve.

Then, Jalābhimantraṇam is done while reciting the Gayatri mantra to purify the water just before Prathama Mārjana.

=== Prathama Mārjanam ===
Marjanam is also known as Mantrasnānam (bath with mantras). Mantras commonly used here praise water as a source of nourishment, medicines and energy.

=== Mantrācamanam ===
Mantrācamanaṃ (मन्त्राचमन) or Jalaprāśanaṃ (जलप्राशन) refers to the sipping of water while reciting relevant Vedic mantras for internal purification before performing ritual acts. One offers water consecrated by mantras to the "fire" present in the mouth, contemplating that the body, mind, and heart have been cleansed. The sins addressed include mental (e.g., evil thoughts, anger), oral (e.g., lies, abuse), and physical (e.g., theft, prohibited sexual acts, consuming undesirable food, or crushing creatures underfoot). The ritual seeks the emancipation from sins committed during the day or night.

=== Punarmārjanam ===
Smṛtyācāmana is performed two times. Then the Punarmārjanaṃ, or second cleansing is done.

=== Aghamarṣaṇaṃ ===
Aghamarṣaṇaṃ (अघमर्षणम्) is a ritual intended to liberate one from sins. A few drops of water are taken in the hand while chanting the related mantra. The practitioner mentally induces the Pāpapuruṣa (personification of sin) to exit through the nose into the water, which is then thrown to the left side. In the Yajurveda Sandhyā, the meaning of the mantra is:

Om, even as the perspiring gets relief from the shade of the tree, as bathing removes the impurities of the body, as the ghee becomes purified by its purifying agent. (Yajurveda, Taittiriya Brahmana, 2-4-4-43)
So let the Waters purify me from all sins.

=== Arghyapradānam ===
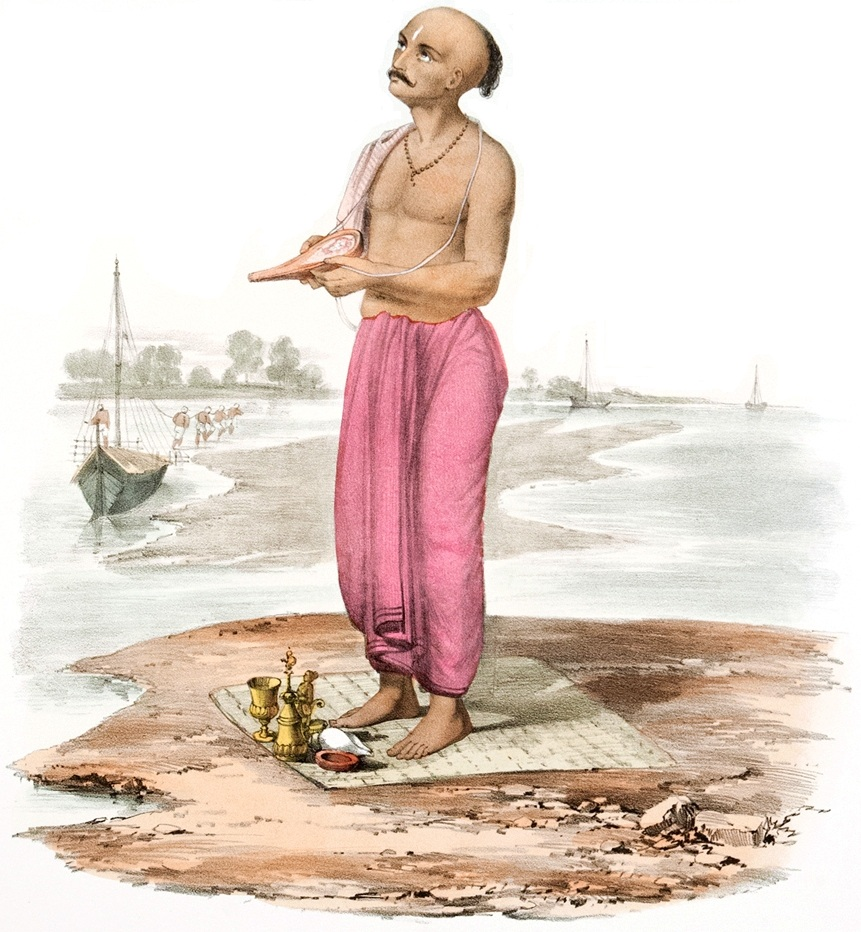
An illustration of a Sanatana offering Arghya from 'The Sundhya, or, the Daily Prayers of the Sanatana' (1851) by Sophie Charlotte Belnos.

One Smṛtyācāmana (स्मृत्याचमन) and one Prāṇāyāma (प्राणायाम) are performed. Following this, arghyapradāna (अर्घ्यप्रदान) refers to the offering of water to the Sun with two hands as laid down in the Grihyasutras. A handful of water is taken in two cupped hands while standing in front of the Sun. The Savitri (i.e., Gayatri Mantra) is then recited, preceded by the vyāhṛtis and the pranava (i.e., om). Arghya is offered three times. These three arghyas are believed to destroy the Mandeha Rakshasas who are said to fight the Sun during each sandhyā (twilight). (Note: According to a story in the Taittiriya Aranyaka, a tribe of demons called Mandeha Rakshasas live on an island called Arunam. Every morning, they march to conquer space and threaten to destroy the Sun. The arghya water offered during Sandhyā becomes infinitely strong, forcing the rakshasas to retreat to their island. It is said that the first arghya destroys their horses, the second destroys their weapons, and the third kills them. However, due to a boon from Brahma, they revive and fight again at the next sandhyā.). If there is delay in sandhya by exceeding the sandhya time, then Prāyaścitta arghya (i.e. fourth one) is given.

=== Sandhyopāsanam (Dhyāna) ===
The sun is then contemplated as Brahman (i.e., the supreme reality) through the mantra asā'vādityo brahmā (असाऽवादित्यो ब्रह्मा, lit. "this Āditya is indeed the Brahman"). Smartas who adhere to advaita utter the additional verse So'ham asmi and Aham brahmāsmi (सोऽहमस्मि। अहं ब्रह्मास्मि॥, lit. "This is I" (Note: सः (saḥ, "it") + अहम् (aham, "I am"), undergoing visarga sandhi. It is a phrase used by the Advaita Vedānta school of Hinduism, signifying oneness with Brahman.) and "I am Brahman" (Note: Aham brahmāsmi is a Mahavakya from the Yajurveda.)).

=== Tarpaṇaṃ ===
Next, two rounds of Smṛtyācāmana (स्मृत्याचमन) and three rounds of Prāṇāyāma (प्राणायाम) are performed. Tarpana (तर्पण) is a term in Vedic practice referring to an offering made to divine entities, where water is taken in the right hand and poured over the straightened fingers. In Sandhyā (संध्या), four devatarpaṇas (देवतर्पण) are offered to the Sandhyādevatā (संध्यादेवता). (Note: In devatarpaṇa (देवतर्पण), the water is poured over the middle of the palm, kept in a slanted position pointing downwards, so the water flows down from the tips of the four fingers, excluding the thumb.)

=== Gāyatrī āhvānam ===
In Gāyatrī āhvānam (lit. "invitation of Gāyatrī"), the Sandhyādevatā (the deity of Sandhyā) is invited with relevant Vedic mantras. One Śrautācāmana (श्रोताचमन) and one Prāṇāyāma (प्राणायाम) are performed. Following this, the Gāyatrī japa sankalpa (गायत्री जप संकल्प) is recited.

=== Nyāsa ===
In nyāsa (न्यास), the mental appropriation or assignment of various parts of the body to tutelary deities is performed just before and after Gāyatrī japa (गायत्री जप). There are two types of nyāsa: karanyāsa (करन्यास) and aṅganyāsa (अङ्गन्यास). These involve the "ritualistic placement of the fingers over different parts of the body as prescribed," accompanied by related ancillary mantras. When performed before japa, aṅganyāsa ends with the utterance of digbandhaḥ (दिग्बन्धः, invoking protection from the eight cardinal directions). When performed after japa, it ends with digvimokaḥ (दिग्विमोकः, releasing the protection). Following this, the Gāyatrīdhyāna mantra (गायत्रीध्यान मन्त्र) is recited.

=== Mudrāpradarśanam ===
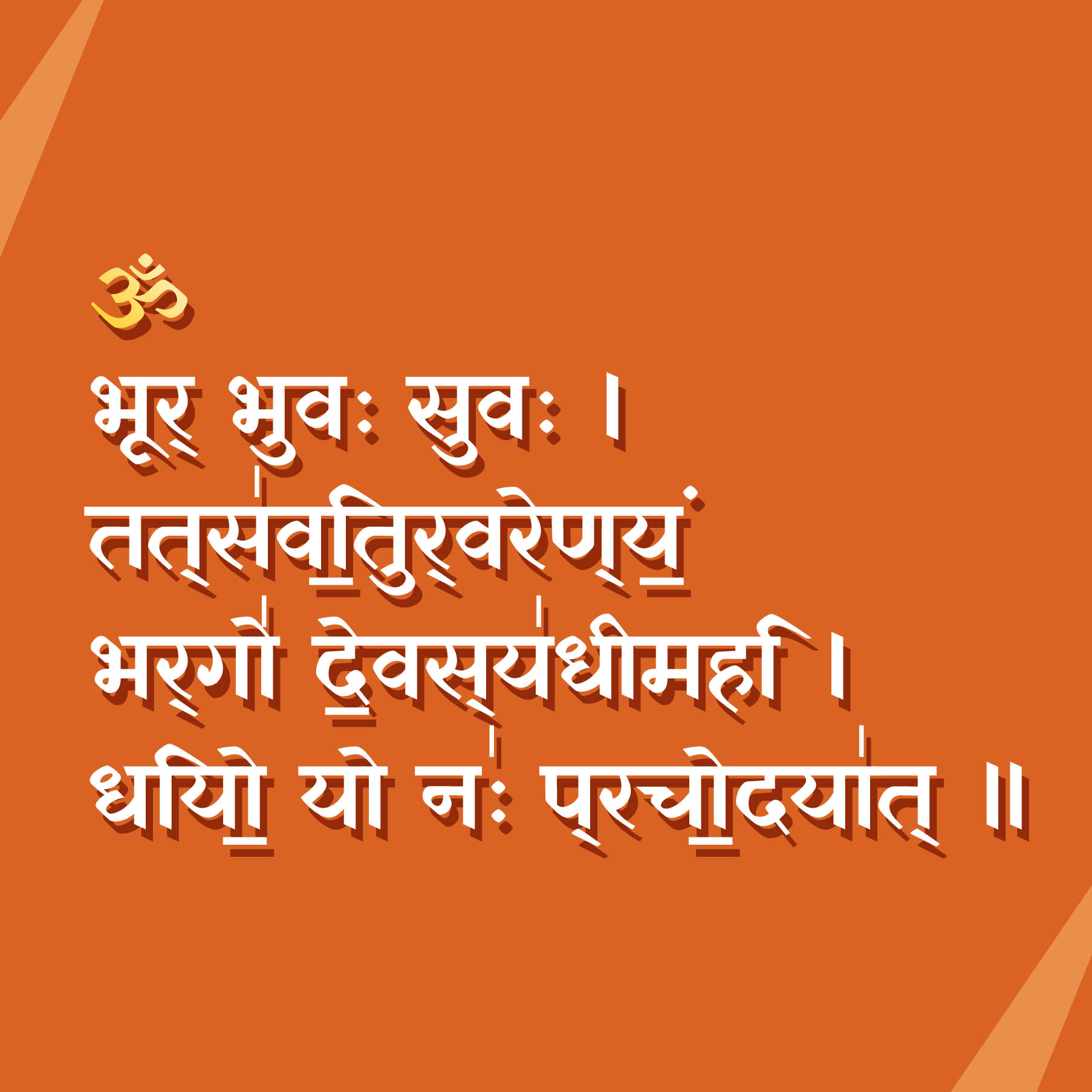
Gayatri mantra with svaras.

Mudrāpradarśana (मुद्रा प्रदर्शन) refers to the display of various mudras (मुद्रा, mudrā, meaning "hand gestures") before and after the recitation of the japa (जप, japa, meaning "chanting or recitation").

The use of mudras in Sandhyavandanam, reflecting Tantric influences, is particularly emphasised by practitioners of the Rigvedic and Yajurvedic traditions to enhance focus and spiritual energy. These gestures incorporate a blend of Vedic and Tantric elements, with variations depending on the specific tradition.

These mudras are shown immediately after performing the nyāsa (न्यास, nyāsa, meaning "ritual placement of fingers"). In Sandhyāvandanam (सन्ध्यावन्दनम्, sandhyāvandana), there are 32 mudras: 24 are pūrva mudras (पूर्व मुद्रा, pūrva mudrā, meaning "pre-japa mudras"), and the remaining 8 are uttara mudras (उत्तर मुद्रा, uttara mudrā, meaning "post-japa mudras").

pūrvamudrā pradarśanam –

sumukhaṃ sampuṭaṃ caiva vitataṃ vistṛtaṃ tathā dvimukhaṃ trimukhaṃ caiva catuḥ pañcamukhaṃ tathā ṣaṇmukho’dhomukhaṃ caiva vyāpikāñjalikaṃ tathā śakaṭaṃ yamapāśaṃ ca grathitaṃ sammukhonmukham pralambaṃ muṣṭikaṃ caiva matsyaḥ kūrmo varāhakam siṃhākrāntaṃ mahākrāntaṃ mudgaraṃ pallavaṃ tathā

	1	2	3	4	5	6	7	8
mudras	sumukhaṃ	sampuṭaṃ	vitataṃ	vistṛtaṃ	dvimukhaṃ	trimukhaṃ	catuḥ	pañcamukhaṃ
	9	10	11	12	13	14	15	16
mudras	ṣaṇmukho	adhomukhaṃ	vyāpikāñjalikaṃ	śakaṭaṃ	yamapāśaṃ	grathitaṃ	sammukhonmukham	pralambaṃ
	17	18	19	20	21	22	23	24
mudras	muṣṭikaṃ	matsyaḥ	kūrmo	varāhakam	siṃhākrāntaṃ	mahākrāntaṃ	mudgaraṃ	pallavaṃ

After showing 24 mudras, the following sloka that emphasizes on showing mudras is to be uttered:

caturvimśati mudravaigāyatryāṃ supratiṣṭhitāḥ
(itimudrā najānāti gāyatrī niṣphalābhavet)

Meaning: These 24 mudrās are well established in the Gayatri mantra. If one does not know these mudrās, the meditation of the Gayatri becomes fruitless.

=== Gāyatrī mantra (Japa) ===
Just before the japa, the Gāyatrī mantrārtha śloka that conveys the meaning of the Gāyatrī mantra is recited. The Gāyatrī mantra is then chanted either 1008, (Note: Referred to as sahasra gāyatrī.) 108, (Note: Referred to as aṣṭottara-śata gāyatrī.) 54, (Note: Referred to as caturpancāśat gāyatrī.) 28, (Note: Referred to as aṣṭāvimśati gāyatrī.) or at least 10 (Note: Referred to as daśa gāyatrī.) times, using either a japamāla (prayer beads) or a karamāla (hand-counting). Meditation upon the solar deity is performed, as he is considered the absolute reality (Parabrahman) residing in the lotus of the heart (hṛtpadma) of all beings. The counting should be done with the right hand, which should be covered with a cloth.

There are three methods of performing japa:

- Vācika (वाचिक): where the mantra is pronounced clearly and aloud.
- Upāmśu (उपांशु): where the lips move silently, and only the meditator hears the mantra.
- Mānasa (मानस) or Mānasika (मानसिक): which involves purely mental recitation of the mantra.

=== Gāyatrī japāvasānam ===
One Śrautācāmana and one Prāṇāyāma are performed. Following this, the Gāyatrī japāvasāna sankalpa is recited. Then, nyasa is performed again, concluding with the utterance of digvimokaḥ, after which the Gāyatrī dhyāna mantra is recited. Subsequently, the remaining 8 uttara mudras are shown.

uttaramudrā pradarśanam –

surabhiḥ jñāna cakraṃ ca yoniḥ kūrmo’tha paṅkajam liṅgaṃ niryāṇa mudrā cetyaṣṭamudrāḥ prakīrtitāḥ

	1	2	3	4	5	6	7	8
mudras	surabhiḥ	jñāna	cakraṃ	yoniḥ	kūrma	paṅkajam	liṅgaṃ	niryāṇa

The fruit of the japa is then offered to Brahman by uttering Om tat sat brahmārpaṇam astu (Sanskrit: ॐ तत्सत् ब्रह्मार्पणमस्तु, lit. "That is truth; [the fruit of japa] is offered to Brahman").

=== Sūryopasthānaṃ ===
One Smṛtyācāmana and three rounds of Prāṇāyāma are performed. During upasthānaṃ, mantras related to Mitra (in the morning), Surya (at solar noon), and Varuna (in the evening) are chanted while standing and facing the sun. In the morning, one faces east; at noon, one faces north; and in the evening, one faces west.

=== Digdevata vandanam ===
Digdevata vandanam or Dik Namaskāraḥ involves prayers to the deities of the cardinal directions: Indra (East), Agni (Southeast), Yama (South), Nirṛti (Southwest), Varuna (West), Vayu (Northwest), Soma (North), Īśāna (Northeast), Brahma (Upward), and Vishnu (Downward). These deities are considered witnesses to all our deeds, and the ideals represented by each of them provide direction and guidance in one's spiritual journey.

Next, Muni namaskāraḥ and Devatā namaskāraḥ are performed, where salutations are offered to the munis (sages) and devatas (deities). Among Smartas, there is an additional practice of Hariharābheda smaraṇam, where Smartas contemplate the oneness of Śiva and Vishnu.

=== Gāyatrī Prasthānam ===
Gāyatrī Prasthānam or Udvāsana involves bidding farewell to the Sandhyādevata by relevant Vedic mantras.

Essence: "Born on the highest peak, on the earth's mountain summit, permitted by the Brāhmins, O goddess, depart happily."

"O boon-giving Mother of the Vedas, praised by me, dwelling in the air, born from the twice-born (Brāhmins), grant me long life on earth, wealth, and Brahmic radiance, and after bestowing these, proceed to the world of Brahman."

=== Nārāyaṇābhivandanam ===
Lord Nārayaṇa is hailed by chanting a relevant mantra: (Note: namo'stvanantāya sahasramūrtaye sahasrapādākṣi śirorubāhave sahasranāmne puruṣāya śāśvate sahasrakoṭi yugadhāriṇe namaḥ)

=== Bhūmyākāśa ābhivandanam ===
The Sky (Dyaus Pitṛ) and the Earth (Pṛthivī) are offered salutations, considering them as parents, through Sāṣṭāṅga Namaskāra, accompanied by relevant Vedic mantras from the Taittiriya Brahmana.

=== Iśvara Prārthanā ===
Lord Vāsudeva (i.e. Krishna) is hailed by chanting relevant mantras. (Note: Ākāśāt patitam toyam। yathā gacchati sāgaram। sarva deva namaskāraḥ। keśavam pratigacchati॥ sarvavedeṣu yatpuṇyaṃ। sarvatīrtheṣu yatphalaṃ। tatphalaṃ purusha āpnoti। stutvā devaṃ janārthanam॥ vāsanāt vāsudevasya। vāsitam te bhuvanatrayam। sarvabhūtanivāso'si। vāsudeva namo'stu te॥)

=== Abhivādanam ===
It is a formal salutation by reciting one's Gotra and Pravara. This also serves as an expression of gratitude to the teachers (Rishis) for transmitting divine wisdom to the next generation. It is customary to mention one's name, gotra, pravara, adhered Dharmasutra (of Kalpa), and the Veda followed along with its śakha (recension).

A typical abhivādana (recitation of pravara) for a Yajurvedin is as follows:

catussāgara paryantaṃ go brāhmaṇebhyaśśubham bhavatu
....ṛṣeya pravarānvita
....gotraḥ, .......sūtraḥ
....yajuśśākhādhyāyi
....śarmā'haṃ bho abhivādaye (Note: चतुस्सागर पर्यन्तं गो ब्राह्मणेभ्यश्शुभम् भवतु....ऋशेय प्रवरान्वित....गोत्रः, ........सूत्रः....यजुश्शाखाध्यायी....शर्माऽहं भो अभिवादये)

In the above abhivādana, Kshatriyas and Vaishyas replace śarmā with varmā and guptā, respectively.

=== Samarpaṇam ===
One Purāṇācamana and one Smṛtyācāmana are performed. Following this, Samarpaṇam is undertaken, signifying that the entire process was carried out with the intent to please the Divine as per His directions. The fruits of these actions are also offered to Him, acknowledging that He equitably distributes them. This ritual embodies the philosophy of total surrender, intended to diminish pride and instill humility.

kāyena vācā manasendriyairvā
buddhyātmanā vā prakṛteḥ svabhāvāt
karomi yadyatsakalaṃ parasmai
nārāyaṇāyeti samarpayāmi (Note: कायेन वाचा मनसेन्द्रियैर्वा। बुद्ध्यात्मना वा प्रकृतेः स्वभावात्। करोमि यद्यत्सकलं परस्मै। नारायणायेति समर्पयामि॥)

My body, speech, mind, senses,
intellect, essence, or outer and inner tendencies,
All that I will do over and over,
to the supreme Nārāyaṇa I offer.

=== Kṣamāpaṇam ===
Finally, Kṣamāpaṇam (literally, "begging pardon" from the Divine) is performed to seek forgiveness for any acts of omission or errors that may have been committed. This is done by chanting three of His names thrice. Even with the best of intentions and utmost care, inadequacies may occur. The practice encourages self-reflection, correction of mistakes, and striving for improvement.

== Daily duties of Dwijas ==
Performing Sandhyāvandana (संध्यावन्दन) first establishes the eligibility for a Dwija to perform all subsequent rituals. According to the Dharmaśāstra (धर्मशास्त्र), rituals performed without Sandhyāvandana are considered fruitless, making it the foundation for all other Vedic rituals. After performing mādhyāhnika-sandhyā (माध्यानिक संध्या, midday prayer), one atones for sins incurred during meal preparation (e.g., boiling rice, cutting vegetables, burning firewood). In the Vaishvadeva homa (वैश्वदेव होम), rice cakes are offered to the Vishvadevas (विश्वदेवाः), representing all deities.

According to the Śāṅkhāyana-gṛhya-sūtra (शाङ्खायनगृह्यसूत्र, Adhyāya II, Khaṇḍa 9), a person should go into the forest, carrying a piece of wood, and, seated, perform Sandhyā (संध्या, twilight prayers) at dusk, maintaining silence and facing north-west (between the west and north-west points of the horizon) until the stars appear. During this time, one murmurs the Mahāvyāhṛtis (महाव्याहृतयः), the Sāvitrī (सावित्री), and auspicious hymns. At dawn, facing east, one stands until the sun rises, after which Vedic study resumes.

== Miscellaneous ==
Other aspects of the ritual, though not strictly part of Sandhyāvandana, may include meditation, the chanting of other mantras (japa), and devotional practices specific to divinities preferred by the practitioner. Regarding the connection with meditation practices, Monier-Williams notes that if considered an act of meditation, the word sandhyā may be etymologically related to san-dhyai.

Depending on the practitioner's belief system—Smarta, Sri Vaishnava, or Madhva—certain mantras or procedures may vary slightly, though the core elements like mārjanaṃ (sprinkling of water), prāśanaṃ (drinking water), punar-mārjanaṃ (additional sprinkling), and arghya-pradānaṃ (offering water) remain the same in most cases. Smārtas (Advaitins) also practice aikyānu-Sandhānam, where Yajurvedins recite a verse from the Bṛhadāraṇyaka Upanishad (brahmair vāhaṃ asmi). Sivaprasad Bhattacharya defines it as the "Hindu code of liturgical prayers."

== See also ==
- Aupasana
- Brahmin
- Yajurveda
- Veda
- Śāstra pramāṇam in Hinduism

== Bibliography ==
- Dewan Bahadur T.R. Ramachandra Iyer; C. Sankara Rama Sastri, eds. (1931). Sandhyavandana: With the Bhashya of Vedanti Sitaram Sastri (online text). Madras: Sri Balamanorama Press.

== Sources ==
- Balu, Meenakshi (2006). Rig Veda Trikaala Sandhyaavandanam. Chennai: MB Publishers. ISBN 81-8124-071-5. (fourth revised & enlarged edition).
- Balu, Meenakshi (2008). Yajur Veda Trikaala Sandhyaavandanam (Abasthampam & Bodhayanam). Chennai: Giri Trading. ISBN 978-81-7950-451-2. (First Edition).
- Apte, Vaman Shivram (1965). The Practical Sanskrit Dictionary. Delhi: Motilal Banarsidass Publishers. ISBN 81-208-0567-4. (fourth revised & enlarged edition).
- Radhakrishnan, Sarvepalli (Editorial Chairman) (1956). The Cultural Heritage of India. Calcutta: The Ramakrishna Mission Institute of Culture. Second edition, four volumes, revised and enlarged, 1956 (volume IV).
- Taimni, I. K. (1978). Gāyatrī. Adyar, Chennai, India: The Theosophical Publishing House. ISBN 81-7059-084-1. (Second Revised Edition).
- Taimni, I. K. (1978). Gāyatrī. Adyar, Chennai, India: The Theosophical Publishing House. ISBN 81-7059-084-1. (Second Revised Edition).
