= Kiritamukuta =

Crown worn by Vishnu in Hindu iconography

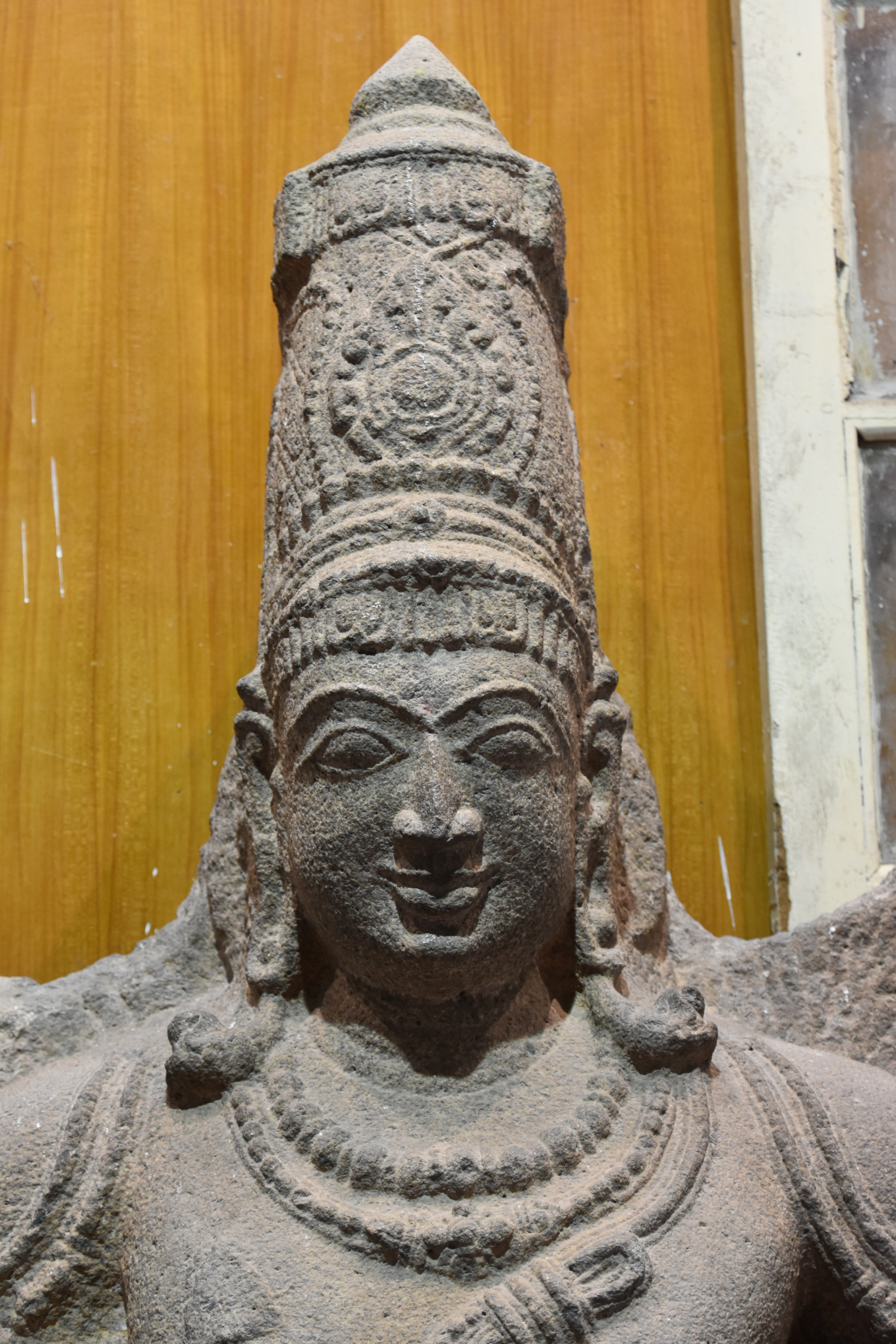
15th century sculpture of Vishnu wearing the Kiritamukuta, Government Museum, Chennai

The Kiritamukuta (Sanskrit: किरीटमुकुट, romanized: Kirīṭamukuṭa) is a crown generally attributed to Vishnu in Hindu iconography. It is also depicted to be worn by the avatars of Vishnu, such as Rama. Vishnu is depicted with the Kiritamukuta in some of his earliest icons, identified from the region of Mathura.

== Description ==
Referred to as the 'highest of all crowns', the Kiritamukuta resembles a conical cap ending with an ornamental top, its centre featuring a pointed knob. It bears jewelled discs either on the front or on all of its sides, as well as jewelled bands present around its top and bottom. Among the gods, according to T. A. Gopinatha Rao, the crown is said to be exclusively attributed to Vishnu, while among humans, those who occupy the roles of emperors or superior governors are allowed to don it.

The sun god Surya is also represented with the Kiritamukuta in his iconography.

Iconography of Vishnu wearing the kiritamukuta has been found in Thailand.
